= 46th government of Turkey =

Government of the Republic of Turkey (1987-1989)

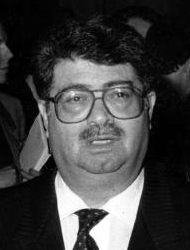

The 46th government of Turkey (December 21, 1987 – November 9, 1989) was a government in the history of Turkey. It is also known as the second Özal government.

== Background ==
Motherland Party (ANAP) won the elections held on November 29, 1987. Turgut Özal, the leader of ANAP, who was also the prime minister of the previous government, founded the government.

== The government ==
In the list below, the serving period of cabinet members who served only a part of the cabinet's lifespan are shown in the column "Notes".

Title	Name	Party	Notes
Prime Minister	Turgut Özal	ANAP	December 21, 1987 – October 31, 1989
Deputy Prime Minister	Kaya Erdem; Ali Bozer	ANAP	December 21, 1987 – January 5, 1989; March 30, 1989 – November 9, 1989
Minister of State
Minister of State	Kazım Oksay; Güneş Taner	ANAP	December 21, 1987 – March 30, 1989; March 30, 1989 – November 9, 1989
Minister of State	Abdullah Tenekeci; Işın Çelebi	ANAP	December 21, 1987 – March 30, 1989; March 30, 1989 – November 9, 1989
Minister of State	Veysel Atasoy; Kamran İnan	ANAP	December 21, 1987 – June 26, 1989; June 26, 1989 – March 30, 1989
Minister of State	Ali Bozer	ANAP	December 21, 1987 – March 30, 1989
Minister of State	Yusuf Bozkurt Özal; İsmail Özarslan	ANAP	December 21, 1987 – March 30, 1989; March 30, 1989 – November 9, 1989
Minister of State	Adnan Kahveci; Saffet Sert	ANAP	December 21, 1987 – March 30, 1989; March 30, 1989 – November 9, 1989
Minister of State	Mehmet Yazar	ANAP	
Minister of State	Cemil Çiçek	ANAP	
Minister of State	Nihat Kitapçı	ANAP	December 21, 1987 – July 6, 1988
Minister of State	Ercüment Konukman	ANAP	March 30, 1989 – November 9, 1989
Ministry of Justice	Oltan Sungurlu; Mehmet Topaç; Oltan Sungurlu	ANAP	December 21, 1987 – June 27, 1989; December 21, 1987 – March 30, 1989; March 30, 1989 – November 9, 1989
Ministry of National Defense	Ercan Vuralhan; Safa Giray	ANAP	December 21, 1987 – March 30, 1989; March 30, 1989 – November 9, 1989
Ministry of the Interior	Mustafa Kalemli; Abdülkadir Aksu	ANAP	December 21, 1987 – March 30, 1989; March 30, 1989 – November 9, 1989
Ministry of Foreign Affairs	Mesut Yılmaz	ANAP	
Ministry of Finance and Customs	Kurtcebe Alptemoçin; Ekrem Pakdemirli	ANAP	December 21, 1987 – March 30, 1989; March 30, 1989 – November 9, 1989
Ministry of National Education Youth and Sports (Note: Youth and sports beyond the scope after 02.03.1989)	Hasan Celal Güzel; Avni Akyol	ANAP	March 2, 1989 – March 30, 1989; March 30, 1989 – November 9, 1989
Ministry of Public Works	Safa Giray; Cengiz Altınkaya	ANAP	December 21, 1987 – March 30, 1989; March 30, 1989 – November 9, 1989
Ministry of Health and Social Security (Note: Social security beyond the scope after 02.03.1989)	Bülent Akarcalı; Nihat Kitapçı; Halil Şıvgın	ANAP	December 21, 1987 – June 27, 1989 June 27, 1989 – March 30, 1989; March 30, 1989 – November 9, 1989
Ministry of Agriculture Forestry and Village Affairs	Hüsnü Doğan; Lütfullah Kayalar	ANAP	December 21, 1987 – March 30, 1989; March 30, 1989 – November 9, 1989
Ministry of Transport	Ekrem Pakdemirli; Cengiz Tuncer	ANAP	December 21, 1987 – March 30, 1989; March 30, 1989 – November 9, 1989
Ministry of Labour and Social Security	İmren Aykut	ANAP	
Ministry of Industry and Commerce	Şükrü Yürür	ANAP	
Ministry Culture and Tourism	Tınaz Titiz; İlham Aküzüm	ANAP	December 21, 1987 – March 30, 1989; March 30, 1989 – November 9, 1989; Culture beyond the scope after March 30, 1989
Ministry Culture	Namık Kemal zeybek	ANAP	March 30, 1989 – November 9, 1989
Ministry of Energy and Natural Resources	Fahrettin Kurt	ANAP	

== Aftermath ==
On 31 October 1989, Turgut Özal was elected the president of Turkey. According to the constitution, he left the office of prime minister. After a brief period during which Ali Bozer was the acting prime minister, the new government was founded by Yıldırım Akbulut.

== Notes ==
Preceded by 45th government of Turkey (Turgut Özal)	46th Government of Turkey; 21 December 1987- 9 November 1989	Succeeded by 47th government of Turkey (Yıldırım Akbulut)
