= 45th government of Turkey =

Government of the Republic of Turkey (1983-1987)

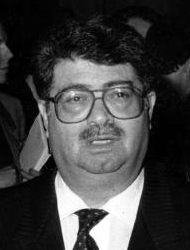

The 45th government of Turkey (13 December 1983 – 21 December 1987) was the first civilian government founded after the 1980 Turkish coup d'état. It is also known as the first Özal government.

== Background ==
Motherland Party (ANAP) won the elections held on 6 November 1983, in which only three parties were allowed to run. Turgut Özal of ANAP founded the government.

== The government ==
In the list below, the serving period of cabinet members who served only a part of the cabinet's lifespan are shown in the column "Notes". According to Turkish constitution three members of the government were replaced by independent members before the elections.

Title	Name	Party	Notes
Prime Minister	Turgut Özal	ANAP	
Deputy Prime Minister	Kaya Erdem	ANAP	
Minister of State
Minister of State	İsmail Özdağlar; Cemal Büyükbaş; Vehbi Dinçerler	ANAP	13 December 1983 – 5 January 1985; 05.01.1985 – 13 September 1985; 13 September 1985 – 21 December 1987
Minister of State	Ahmet Kurtcebe Alptemoçin; Ahmet Karaevli	ANAP	13 December 1983 – 26 October 1984; 26 October 1984 – 21 December 1987
Minister of State	Sudi Türel; Tınaz Titiz	ANAP	13 December 1983 – 05.01.1985; 05.01.1985 – 21 December 1987
Minister of State	Mesut Yılmaz; Hasan Celal Güzel	ANAP	13 December 1983 – 17 October 1986; 17 October 1986 – 21 December 1987
Minister of State	Abdullah Tenekeci	ANAP	
Minister of State	Kazım Oksay	ANAP	
Minister of State	Ali Bozer	ANAP	
Ministry of Justice	Nejat Eldem; Oltan Sungurlu; Halil Ertem	ANAP; ANAP; Indep	13 December 1983 – 17 October 1986; 17 October 1986 – 16 September 1987; 16 September 1987 – 21 December 1987
Ministry of National Defense	Zeki Yavuztürk	ANAP	
Ministry of the Interior	Ali Tanrıyar; Yıldırım Akbulut; Ahmet Selçulk	ANAP; ANAP; Indep	13 December 1983 – 26 October 1984; 26 October 1984 – 06.09.1987; 16 September 1987 – 21 December 1987
Ministry of Foreign Affairs	Vahit Melih Halefoğlu	ANAP	
Ministry of Finance and Customs	Vural Arıkan; Ahmet Kurtcebe Alptemoçin	ANAP	13 December 1983 – 26 October 1984; 26 October 1984 – 21 December 1987
Ministry of National Education	Vehbi Dinçerler; Metin Emiroğlu	ANAP	13 December 1983 – 13 September 1985; 13 September 1985 – 21 December 1987
Ministry of Public Works	Safa Giray	ANAP	
Ministry of Health and Social Security	Mehmet Aydın; Mustafa Kalemli	ANAP	
Ministry of Agriculture Forestry and Village Affairs	Hüsnü Doğan	ANAP	
Ministry of Transport	Veysel Atasoy; İhsan Pekel	ANAP; Indep	13 December 1983 – 16 September 1987; 16 September 1987 – 21 December 1987
Ministry of Labour and Social Security	Mustafa Kalemli; Mükerrem Taşçıoğlu	ANAP	13 December 1983 – 17 October 1986; 17 October 1986 – 21 December 1987
Ministry of Industry and Commerce	Cahit Aral	ANAP	
Ministry Culture and Tourism	Mükerrem Taşçıoğlu; Mesut Yılmaz	ANAP	13 December 1983 – 17 October 1986; 17 October 1986 – 21 December 1987
Ministry of Energy and Natural Resources	Cemal Büyükbaş; Sudi Türel	ANAP	13 December 1983 – 05.01.1985; 5.01.1985 – 21 December 1987

== Aftermath ==
The government ended with the elections held on 29 November 1987. ANAP also won the 1987 elections (albeit with reduced support), and the next government was also founded by Turgut Özal.

Preceded by 44th government of Turkey (Bülent Ulusu)	45th Government of Turkey; 13 December 1983 – 21 December 1987	Succeeded by 46th government of Turkey (Turgut Özal)
