= 48th government of Turkey =

Government of the Republic of Turkey (1991)

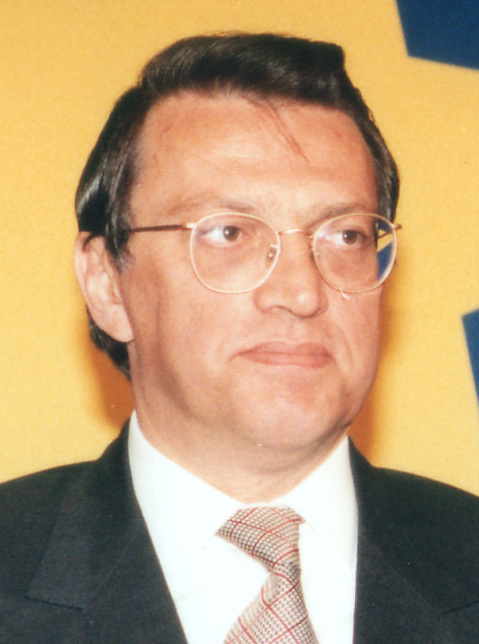

The 48th government of Turkey (23 June 1991 – 20 November 1991) was a government led by Mesut Yılmaz of Motherland Party (ANAP).

== Background ==
ANAP had the majority of seats in the parliament, but after Turgut Özal was elected as the president of Turkey, his prime minister post was offered to Yıldırım Akbulut. However, after the congress of the party, Mesut Yılmaz was elected as the new chairman of the party and was consequently appointed as the prime minister.

== The government ==
In the list below, the serving period of cabinet members who served only a part of the cabinet's lifespan are shown in the column "Notes". According to Turkish constitution some members of the government were replaced by independent members before the elections.

| Title | Name | Psarty | Notes |
|---|---|---|---|
| Prime Minister | Mesut Yılmaz | ANAP | |
| Deputy Prime Minister | Ekrem Pakdemirli | ANAP | |
Minister of State
| Minister of State | Fahrettin Kurt | ANAP | |
| Minister of State | Mustafa Taşar | ANAP | |
| Minister of State | İmren Aykut | ANAP | |
| Minister of State | Vehbi Dinçerler | ANAP | |
| Minister of State | Kamran İnan | ANAP | |
| Minister of State | İlhan Aküzün | ANAP | |
| Minister of State | Cengiz Tuncer | ANAP | |
| Minister of State | Sabahattin Aras | ANAP | |
| Minister of State | Ersin Koçak | ANAP | |
| Minister of State | Mehmet Çevik | ANAP | |
| Minister of State | Cenap Gülpınar | ANAP | |
| Minister of State | Birsel Sönmez | ANAP | |
| Minister of State | Ali Talip Özdemir; Akgün Albayrak | ANAP | 23 June 1991 – 22 August 1991; 20 November 1991 – 20 November 1991 |
| Ministry of Justice | Şakir Şeker; Suat Bilge | ANAP; Indep | 23 June 1991 – 29 August 1991; 29 August 1991 – 20 November 1991 |
| Ministry of National Defense | Barlas Doğu | ANAP | |
| Ministry of the Interior | Mustafa Kalemli; Sabahattin Çakmakoğlu | ANAP; Indep | 23 June 1991 – 26 August 1991; 29 August 1991 – 20 November 1991 |
| Ministry of Foreign Affairs | Safa Giray | ANAP | |
| Ministry of Finance | Adnan Kahveci | ANAP | |
| Ministry of National Education | Avni Akyol | ANAP | |
| Ministry of Public Works | Hüsamettin Örüç | ANAP | |
| Ministry of Health and Social Security | Yaşar Eryılmaz | ANAP | |
| Ministry of Agriculture Forestry and Village Affairs | İlker Tuncay | ANAP | (Forestry beyond the scope after 11 August 1991 ) |
| Ministry of Transport | İbrahim Özdemir; Sabahattin Yalınpala | ANAP; Indep | 23 June 1991 – 29 August 1991; 29 August 1991 – 20 November 1991 |
| Ministry of Labour and Social Security | Metin Emiroğlu | ANAP | |
| Ministry of Industry and Commerce | Rüştü Kazım Yücelen | ANAP | |
| Ministry Tourism | Bülent Akarcalı | ANAP | |
| Ministry Culture | Gökhan Maraş | AMAP | |
| Ministry of Environment | Ali Talip Özdemir | ANAP | 22 August 1991 – 20 November 1991 |
| Ministry of Energy and Natural Resources | Muzaffer Aracu | ANAP | |
| Ministry of Forestry | Mustafa Kalemli | ANAP | 26 August 1991 – 20 November 1991 |

== Aftermath ==
The government ended because of the elections held on 20 October 1991.

| Preceded by 47th government of Turkey (Yıldırım Akbulut) | 48th Government of Turkey; 23 June 1991 – 20 November 1991 | Succeeded by 49th government of Turkey (Süleyman Demirel) |
