= İmren Aykut =

Turkish politician (born 1940)

Minister of Environment and Urban Planning
- In office 30 June 1997 – 11 January 1999
- Prime Minister: Mesut Yılmaz
- Preceded by: Ziyaettin Tokar
- Succeeded by: Fevzi Aytekin

Minister of State
- In office 23 June 1991 – 20 November 1991
- Prime Minister: Mesut Yılmaz

Minister of Labour and Social Security
- In office 21 December 1987 – 23 June 1991
- Prime Minister: Turgut Özal; Yıldırım Akbulut
- Preceded by: Mükerrem Taşçıoğlu
- Succeeded by: Metin Emiroğlu

Member of the Grand National Assembly
- Constituency: 1983: Istanbul; 1987: Istanbul; 1991: Istanbul; 1995: Adana

Personal details
- Born: 1940 (age 85–86) Kozan, Adana, Turkey
- Party: Motherland Party
- Education: Istanbul University
- Profession: Economist, trade unionist, politician

İmren Aykut (born 1940) is a Turkish female economist, trade unionist, politician and former government minister.

== Early years ==
Aykut was born to Evket Şadi and his wife Emine in Kozan, Adana, Turkey in 1940. She completed her primary education at st Atatürk Elementary School, and middle education at Adana Girls' High School. She studied at the Faculty of Economics in Istanbul University graduating in 1964.

Aykut specialized in "Employer-Employee relations", "Industrial relations" and Trade unionism at the University of Oxford in England. She completed a programme on "Executive Participation of Workers" at the University of Oslo in Norway. She also conducted research on "Arbitration and Mediation" in the United States, "Structure of Workers' Unions and Training of Workers" in England. Further, she carried out various researches and studies at the Confederation of Union and the Department of Labour in the United Kingdom. She received a PhD degree from Istanbul University with her thesis "Exchange Rates for Workers (outside Turkey) and Its Analysis from the View of Turkish Economy".

== Professional career ==
Aykut served in two trade unions as department manager for collective bargaining and research between 1964 and 1975, as industrial relations specialist at Şişecam from 1975 to 1976, and secretary general of the Trade Union of Paper Industry Employer between 1976-1983.

== In politics ==
Ayjut was appointed member of the Advisory Parliament of Turkey in 1981. She was among the charter members of the Nationalist Democracy Party (MDP) in 1983. After the party's dissolution in 1986, she joined the Motherland Party (ANAP).

She was elected to the parliament in the general elections of 1987, 1991, 1995 as deputy from Istanbul and 1999 from Adana. She served as Minister of Labour and Social Security in the cabinets of Turgut Özal and Yıldırım Akbulut from 21 December 1987 to 23 June 1991. Her next appointment as minister was State Minister in two cabinets of Mesut Yılmaz at the 48th and 53rd governments. Aykut was appointed Minister of Environment and Urban Planning in the Cabinet of Mesut Yılmaz on 23 June 1991. Her term ended on 20 November 1991.

She is the first ever Turkish female government minister, who came to this position after entering the parliament by general election.

Political offices
Preceded by Mükerrem Taşçıoğlu	Minister of Labour and Social Security; 21 December 1987 – 23 June 1991	Succeeded by Metin Emiroğlu
Preceded by Kâmran İnan, Güneş Taner, Cemil Çiçek, Işın Çelebi, Mehmet Keçeciler, Vehbi Dinçerler, Mustafa Taşar, Kemal Akkaya, Hüsamettin Örüç, İbrahim Özdemir, İsmet Özarslan, Ercüment Konukman,	Minister of State; 23 June 1991 – 20 November 1991; With: Fahrettin Kurt, Mustafa Taşar, Vehbi Dinçerler, Kamran İnan, İlhan Aküzün, Cengiz Tuncer, Sabahattin Aras, Ersin Koçak, Mehmet Çevik, Cenap Gülpınar, Birsel Sönmez	Succeeded by Cavit Çağlar, Tansu Çiller, Ekrem Ceyhun, Akın Gönen, Gökberk Ergenekon, Sefa Kilercioğlu, Ömer Barutçu, Mehmet Batallı, Şerif Ercan , Mehmet Ali Yılmaz, Mehmet Kahraman, Güler İleri, Erman Şahin, İbrahim Tez
Preceded by Necmettin Cevheri, Cavit Çağlar, Cemil Çiçek, Abdülkadir Ateş, Aykon Doğan, Ali Dincer, Ayvaz Gökdemir, Ali Münif İslamoğlu, Adnan Ekmen, Coşkun Kırca, Ömer Barutçu, Mehmet Sevigen, Işılay Saygın, Mehmet Alp, Selim Ensarioğlu, Bekir Sami Daçe	Minister of State; 6 March 1996 – 28 June 1996; With: Rüştü Saracoğlu, Ayfer Yılmaz, Abdülkadir Aksu, Ufuk Söylemez, Eyp Aşık, Yaman Törüner, Ayvaz Gökdemir, Cemil Çiçek, Yaşar Dedelek, Ali Talip Özdemir, Ünal Erkan, Ersin Taranoğlu, Mehmet Halit Dağlı	Succeeded by Fehim Adak, Nevzat Ercan, Abdullah Gül, Işılay Saygın, Sabri Tekir, Nafiz Kurt, Mehmet Altınsoy, Namık Kemal Zeybek, Lütfi Esengün, Selim Ensarioğlu, Cemil Tunç, Bekir Aksoy, Gürcan Dağdaş, Ufuk Söylemez, Teoman Rıza Güneri, Ayfer Yılmaz, Sacit Günbey, Bahattin Şaker, Ahmet Demircan
Preceded by Ziyaettin Tokar	Minister of Environment and Urban Planning; 30 June 1997 – 11 January 1999	Succeeded by Fevzi Aytekin
