= Cengiz Tuncer =

Turkish minister (1942–1992)

Minister of Transport
- In office 21 December 1987 – 9 November 1989
- President: Kenan Evren
- Preceded by: Ekrem Pakdemirli
- Succeeded by: Himself
- In office 9 November 1989 – 23 June 1991
- President: Turgut Özal
- Preceded by: Himself
- Succeeded by: Sabahattin Yalınpala

Minister of State
- In office 23 June 1991 – 20 November 1991
- President: Mesut Yılmaz

Member of the Grand National Assembly
- Constituency: Kayseri (1983); Antalya (1987)

Personal details
- Born: 1942 Manavgat, Antalya, Turkey
- Died: 7 December 1992 (aged 49–50) Ankara, Turkey
- Education: Ankara University
- Occupation: Politician

Cengiz Tuncer (1942 – 7 December 1992) was a Turkish politician who served as the Minister of Transport in the 46th government and 47th government of Turkey, and one of the Ministers of State in the 48th government. After getting his master's degree in West Germany, Tuncer became one of the founding members of the Motherland Party (ANAP) and entered the Grand National Assembly, after which he became a minister.

== Early and personal life ==
Born in 1942 in Manavgat, Antalya, Tuncer graduated from the Faculty of Political Science of the Ankara University in 1964. He got his master's degree in West Germany. He was married and had two children. In addition to Turkish and English, he also spoke German.

== Career ==
Tuncer was one of the founding members of the Motherland Party (ANAP). He entered the Grand National Assembly as an ANAP member in 1983 from the Kayseri district. During his second term in the parliament, he was a member of the Antalya district. He was the Minister of Transport in the 46th (1987–1989) and 47th governments of Turkey (1989–1991). In the 48th government (1991), Tuncer was one of the Ministers of State.

== Death ==
On 7 December 1992, Tuncer was found dead by his younger son, who had returned from school to their home in Ankara.
