= 47th government of Turkey =

Government of the Republic of Turkey (1989-1991)

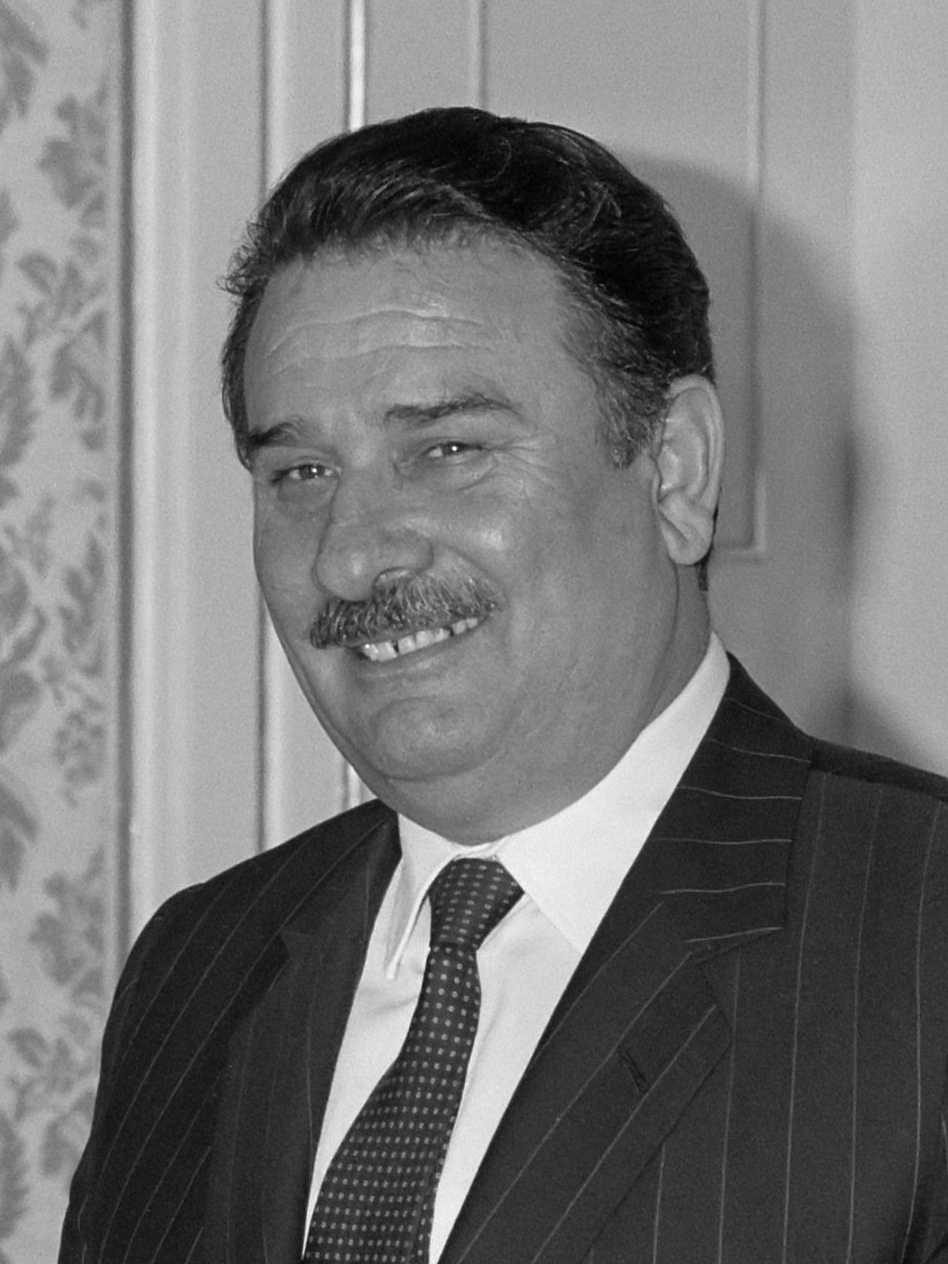
Yıldırım Akbulut

The 47th government of Turkey (9 November 1989 – 23 June 1991) governed Turkey and was led by Yıldırım Akbulut of Motherland Party (ANAP).

== Background ==
On 31 October 1989, Turgut Özal, the previous prime minister, was elected as the president of Turkey. According to the constitution, he left the office of prime minister. After a short period during which Ali Bozer was the acting prime minister, Turgut Özal appointed Yıldırım Akbulut to be the new prime minister.

== The government ==
In the list below, the serving period of cabinet members who served only a part of the cabinet's lifespan are shown in the column "Notes".

Title	Name	Party	Notes
Prime Minister	Yıldırım Akbulut	ANAP	
Deputy Prime Minister	Ali Bozer	ANAP	9 November 1989 – 21 February 1990
Minister of State
Minister of State	Kamran İnan	ANAP	
Minister of State	Güneş Taner	ANAP	
Minister of State	Cemil Çiçek	ANAP	
Minister of State	Işın Çelebi	ANAP	
Minister of State	Mehmet keçeciler	ANAP	
Minister of State	Hüsnü Doğan	ANAP	9 November 1989 – 28 October 1990
Minister of State	Mehmet Yazar	ANAP	9 November 1989 – 1 March 1991
Minister of State	Vehbi Dinçerler	ANAP	
Minister of State	Mustafa Taşar	ANAP	
Minister of State	Kemal Akkaya	ANAP	
Minister of State	Hüsamettin Örüç	ANAP	
Minister of State	İbrahim Özdemir	ANAP	
Minister of State	İsmet Özarslan	ANAP	
Minister of State	Ercüment Konukman	ANAP	
Ministry of Justice	Oltan Sungurlu	ANAP	
Ministry of National Defense	Safa Giray; Güneş Taner (placeholder); Hüsnü Doğan; Mehmet Yazar	ANAP	9 November 1989 – 19 October 1990; 19 October 1990 – 28 October 1990; 28 October 1990 – 22 February 1991; 1 March 1991 – 23 June 1991
Ministry of the Interior	Abdülkadir Aksu	ANAP	
Ministry of Foreign Affairs	Mesut Yılmaz; Ali Bozer; Ahmet Kurtcebe Alptemoçin	ANAP	9 November 1989 – 21 February 1990; 21 February 1990 – 12 October 1990; 13 October 1990 – 23 June 1991
Ministry of Finance	Ekrem Pakdemirli; Adnan Kahveci	ANAP	9 November 1989 – 29 March 1990; 29 March 1990 – 23 June 1991
Ministry of National Education	Avni Akyol	ANAP	
Ministry of Public Works	Cengiz Altınkaya	ANAP	
Ministry of Health and Social Security	Halil Şıngın	ANAP	
Ministry of Agriculture Forestry and Village Affairs	Lütfullah Kayalar	ANAP	
Ministry of Transport	Cengiz Tuncer	ANAP	
Ministry of Labour and Social Security	İmren Aykut	ANAP	
Ministry of Industry and Commerce	Şükrü Yürür	ANAP	
Ministry Tourism	İlhan Aküzüm	ANAP	
Ministry Culture	Namık Kemal Zeybek	AMAP	
Ministry of Energy and Natural Resources	Fahrettin Kurt; Togay Gemalmaz	ANAP	21 December 1987 – 30 April 1991; 30 April 1991 – 23 June 1991

== Aftermath ==
During the congress of the Motherland Party on 15 June 1991, Mesut Yılmaz was elected as the new chairman of the party, and consequently, Yıldırım Akbulut resigned as prime minister.

Preceded by 46th government of Turkey (Turgut Özal)	47th Government of Turkey; 9 November 1989 – 23 June 1991	Succeeded by 48th government of Turkey (Mesut Yılmaz)
