= İsmet Sezgin =

18th Speaker of the Parliament of Turkey

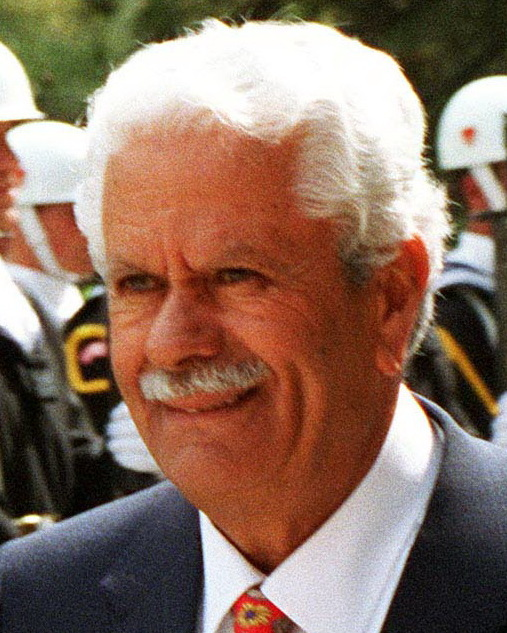
- Sezgin in 1998

Deputy Prime Minister of Turkey
- In office 30 June 1997 – 11 January 1999
- Prime Minister: Mesut Yılmaz
- Served with: Bülent Ecevit
- Preceded by: Tansu Çiller
- Succeeded by: Hüsamettin Özkan

Leader of the Democrat Turkey Party
- In office 17 April 1999 – 18 May 2002
- Preceded by: Hüsamettin Cindoruk
- Succeeded by: Mehmet Ali Bayar

Minister of National Defense
- In office 30 June 1997 – 11 January 1999
- Prime Minister: Mesut Yılmaz
- Preceded by: Turhan Tayan
- Succeeded by: Hikmet Sami Türk

18th Speaker of the Grand National Assembly
- In office 18 October 1995 – 24 December 1995
- President: Süleyman Demirel
- Preceded by: Hüsamettin Cindoruk
- Succeeded by: Mustafa Kalemli

Minister of the Interior
- In office 21 November 1991 – 25 June 1993
- Prime Minister: Süleyman Demirel
- Preceded by: Sabahattin Çakmakoğlu
- Succeeded by: Mehmet Gazioğlu

Minister of Finance
- In office 12 November 1979 – 11 September 1980
- Prime Minister: Süleyman Demirel
- Preceded by: Ziya Müezzinoğlu
- Succeeded by: Kaya Erdem

Minister of Youth and Sports
- In office 3 November 1969 – 26 March 1971
- Prime Minister: Süleyman Demirel
- Preceded by: Position established
- Succeeded by: Sezai Ergun

Member of the Grand National Assembly
- In office 20 October 1991 – 18 April 1999
- Constituency: Aydın (1991, 1995)
- In office 15 October 1961 – 12 September 1980
- Constituency: Aydın (1961, 1965, 1969, 1973, 1977)

Mayor of Aydın
- In office 13 November 1955 – 27 May 1960
- Preceded by: Selim Yatağan
- Succeeded by: Ali Nahit Danışman

Personal details
- Born: 6 January 1928 Aydın, Turkey
- Died: 7 December 2016 (aged 88) Ankara, Turkey
- Party: Democrat (1952–1960); Justice (1961–1980); True Path Party (1987–1997); Democrat Turkey Party (1997–2002)
- Spouse: Saadet Sezgin (1952–2004)
- Children: Sinan Levent; Ayşe Sezgin
- Education: Dokuz Eylül University
- Occupation: Politician

İsmet Sezgin (6 January 1928 – 7 December 2016) was a Turkish politician who served as the Deputy Prime Minister of Turkey and Minister of National Defense from 1997 to 1999, as the Speaker of the Grand National Assembly in 1995, as the Minister of the Interior from 1991 to 1993, as the Minister of Finance from 1979 to 1980 and as the Minister of Youth and Sports from 1969 to 1971. Between 1999 and 2002, he served as the Leader of the Democrat Turkey Party, but did not contest any elections.

With a history in the Turkish political right, Sezgin had actively participated in the historical Democrat Party led by Adnan Menderes until the 1960 coup d'état. Entering Parliament as a Member of Parliament for Aydın in the 1961 general election, he served continuously as an MP until the 1980 coup d'état, after which he was re-elected in the 1991 general election. He lost his seat in the 1999 general election and retired from active politics in 2002. He was also active in sport, having served as the 15th Chairman of Gençlerbirliği S.K. between 1967 and 1968.

== Early life and career ==
İsmet Sezgin was born in 1928, in Aydın as the eldest of 9 children. He completed his primary and secondary education in Aydın and graduated from high school in İzmir. He received higher education at the High Economy and Trade School (now Dokuz Eylül University). During his student years, he was involved in athletics.

After graduating from the High Economy and Trade School in 1950, he immediately began working at the Turkey Real Estate Credit Bank (now Ziraat Bankası) Denizli branch. He married Saadet Sezgin, a mathematics teacher in 1952 and was also elected to the Democrat Party Denizli Provincial Administration Board in the same year.

== Political career ==
=== Mayor of Aydın ===
Sezgin was elected as the Mayor of Aydın in the 1955 local elections from the Democrat Party. He was removed from office as a result of the 1960 coup d'état, during which the Democrat Party government led by Adnan Menderes was ousted from power. As a member of the Democrats, Sezgin was briefly arrested after being removed from office.

=== Justice Party ===
After being freed, Sezgin established the provincial office of the new Justice Party (AP), which was seen as the successor to the Democrat Party. In the 1961 general election, he was elected as an AP Member of Parliament for Aydın. In 1963, he became the President of the Turkish Municipal Association, serving until 1985. In 1967, he became the Chairman of Gençlerbirliği S.K. and served until 1968. In 1968, he was made a Deputy Leader of the Justice Party.

=== Minister of Youth and Sports ===
After the Justice Party won a parliamentary majority in the 1969 general election, Justice Party leader and Prime Minister Süleyman Demirel established the Ministry of Youth and Sports and appointed İsmet Sezgin as Turkey's first Minister of Youth and Sports in his government. Although Demirel briefly resigned after his party MPs rebelled against the government's budget proposals, Sezgin continued as Youth and Sports Minister in the 32nd government of Turkey, which was also formed by Demirel. Sezgin was removed from office, as was the rest of the government, following the 1971 Turkish coup d'état.

=== Minister of Finance ===
Although the Republican People's Party (CHP) was the largest party in Parliament, a poor performance in by-election resulted in the CHP government resigning. Süleyman Demirel was once again tasked with the formation of a new government and eventually formed the 43rd government of Turkey with outside support from the Islamist National Salvation Party (MSP). The government was formed entirely by Justice Party MPs, with Sezgin becoming the Minister of Finance. Due to the parliamentary deadlock resulting from a failed attempt to elect a new President in 1980, the government was ousted from power by the 1980 Turkish coup d'état led by General Kenan Evren. Parliament was abolished and Sezgin was banned, along with many other politicians, from running for political office.

=== Minister of the Interior ===
With his political ban lifted as a result of the 1987 constitutional referendum, Sezgin returned to Parliament as an MP from Aydın in the 1991 general election, this time from the True Path Party (DYP). The DYP had also been formed by Demirel after having his political ban lifted and was seen as a successor to the disbanded Justice Party. Having secured a plurality in the 1991 election, the DYP formed a coalition government with the Social Democratic Populist Party led by Erdal İnönü. In this government, Sezgin was appointed Minister of the Interior.

=== Speaker of the Parliament ===
After President Turgut Özal's death in 1993, Demirel was subsequently elected as the 9th President of Turkey in the 1993 presidential election. In the subsequent leadership election, Sezgin put his name forward as a candidate but withdrew in the second round of the election. After Tansu Çiller was elected as the leader of the DYP, Sezgin resigned as Interior Minister.

In 1995, he was elected as the Speaker of the Grand National Assembly, succeeding Hüsamettin Cindoruk. He served in this position until the 1995 general election, in which the DYP lost 43 seats.

=== Minister of National Defense and Deputy Prime Minister ===
After the DYP formed a coalition government with the Islamist Welfare Party (RP) in 1996, Sezgin resigned from the DYP in protest and was one of the founding members of the new Democrat Turkey Party (DTP). The 'Refahyol' government (DYP-RP coalition) collapsed in 1997 after a military memorandum. Motherland Party (ANAP) leader Mesut Yılmaz was tasked with forming a new government and managed to form a minority triple-party coalition between ANAP, the DTP and the Democratic Left Party (DSP). The DTP leader Hüsamettin Cindoruk did not participate in the government, so Sezgin became Deputy Prime Minister of Turkey as the most senior DTP representative in the coalition government, serving alongside the DSP leader Bülent Ecevit. Sezgin concurrently served as the Minister of National Defense. The government collapsed following the Türkbank scandal, after which the Republican People's Party (CHP) decided to end its outside support for the government.

=== Leader of the DTP ===
In the 1999 general election, the DTP won just 0.58% of the vote, falling far below the 10% election threshold necessary to win parliamentary representation. Sezgin, as well as all other DTP MPs, lost their seats in Parliament. As a result, Hüsamettin Cindoruk resigned as party leader. Sezgin was subsequently elected as the DTP leader in place of Cindoruk, but resigned in May 2002 without contesting any elections as party leader. He announced that he was retiring from active politics. The DTP contested the 2002 general election under an electoral alliance with the DYP, but the two parties combined still failed to pass the 10% boundary.

== Personal life ==
İsmet Sezgin married mathematics teacher Saadet (Sezgin) in 1952; she died in 2004. They had two daughters, Seynan Levent and Ayşe. Sezgin died of multiple organ failure on 7 December 2016, aged 88.

== Legacy and recognition ==
In the Bornova district of İzmir, there is a primary school named after Sezgin.

== See also ==
- List of deputy prime ministers of Turkey
- List of ministers of national defense of Turkey
