= Lütfullah Kayalar =

Turkish politician (born 1952)

Minister of Finance of Turkey
- In office 6 March 1996 – 28 June 1996
- Prime Minister: Mesut Yılmaz
- Preceded by: İsmet Atilla
- Succeeded by: Abdüllatif Şener

Minister of Agriculture, Forestry and Rural Affairs of Turkey
- In office 31 March 1989 – 23 June 1991
- Prime Minister: Turgut Özal; Ali Bozer (acting); Yıldırım Akbulut
- Preceded by: Hüsnü Doğan
- Succeeded by: İlker Tuncay

Member of the Grand National Assembly
- Incumbent
- Assumed office 2 June 2023
- Constituency: Yozgat (2023)
- In office 24 November 1983 – 1 October 2002
- Constituency: Yozgat (1983, 1987, 1991, 1995, 1999)

Personal details
- Born: 1952 (age 73–74) Akdağmadeni, Yozgat, Turkey
- Party: Good Party (2023–present)
- Other political affiliations: Motherland Party (1983–2007); Republican People's Party (2007); Independent (2007-2023)

Lütfullah Kayalar (born 1952) is a Turkish lawyer from profession and politician, who served twice as government minister.

== Career ==
Kayalar was born in Yozgat, Turkey. He graduated from the Law School of Ankara University with a Bachelor of Laws degree. He entered politics as a member of the Motherland Party, and was elected into the parliament as Deputy of Yozgat. Lütfullah Kayalar served in the cabinet of Turgut Özal and later of Yıldırım Akbulut as Minister of Agriculture, Forestry and Rural Affairs between 1989 and 1991, and in the cabinet of Mesut Yılmaz as Minister of Finance in 1996.

At the Motherland Party's 7th congress held on August 4–5, 2001 in Ankara, he ran for the party leadership against Mesut Yılmaz, however without success.

Before the 2007 general election, the two liberal parties, Democratic Party and the Motherland Party, which he was a member of, wanted to merge in order to contest the elections as one party. However, as this intention failed, Lütfullah Kayalar left his party and entered on June 2, 2007 the Republican People's Party, a center-left party, accepting the invitation of its leader Deniz Baykal.

He was elected to the Grand National Assembly of Turkey in the 2023 Turkish parliamentary election from Yozgat for the Good Party.

He is of Yörük ancestry.

Political offices
Preceded by İsmet Attila	Minister of Finance of Turkey; March 6, 1996–June 28, 1996	Succeeded by Abdüllatif Şener
