= Vural Arıkan =

Turkish economist, lawyer and politician (1929–1993)

Minister of Finance
- In office 13 December 1983 – 26 October 1984
- President: Kenan Evren
- Prime Minister: Turgut Özal
- Preceded by: Adnan Başer Kafaoğlu
- Succeeded by: Ahmet Kurtcebe Alptemoçin

Personal details
- Born: 1929 Aydın, Turkey
- Died: 3 August 1993 (aged 63–64)
- Party: Motherland Party (1983–1985); Citizen's Party (1986); True Path Party
- Children: 1
- Education: Ankara University

Vural Arıkan (1929–3 August 1993) was a Turkish economist, lawyer and politician who was the minister of finance for one year from 1983 to 1984. He established a now-defunct political party, Citizen's Party.

== Early life and education ==
Arıkan was born in Aydın in 1929. He had two sisters, Türkan Arıkan and Saadet Özkal. The latter was an engineer and the former was a member of the Parliament.

Arıkan completed his secondary education at Trabzon High School in 1949. He graduated from the Faculty of Political Science, Ankara University in 1953. He later received a degree in law from the same university.

== Career ==
Arıkan joined the General Directorate of Treasury in 1953. He began to work as an assistant financial inspector in 1953. He was the assistant accounting specialist from 1953 to 1956 and the accounting specialist between 9 November 1956 and 1959 at the Ministry of Finance. He left the ministry on 28 November 1959 and worked as a lawyer.

Arıkan started his political career in 1983 when he was involved in the establishment of the Motherland Party. Businessman Şarık Tara introduced him to the party. The same year Arıkan won a seat for the Motherland Party from İzmir in the general election and became a member of the Parliament during the 17th term. He was appointed minister of finance to the cabinet led by Prime Minister Turgut Özal on 13 December 1983. He replaced Adnan Başer Kafaoğlu in the post. Arıkan was described by the Turkish press as one of two liberal cabinet members. The other one was Deputy Prime Minister Kaya Erdem. Arıkan's tenure ended on 26 October 1984 when he was removed from office upon the request of Kenan Evren, military president. His successor was Ahmet Kurtcebe Alptemoçin.

In May 1985 Arıkan left the Motherland Party. On 19 March 1986 he established a political party named Citizen's Party. It dissolved itself on 2 December 1986, and Arıkan joined the True Path Party.

=== Controversy ===
In 1994 Recep Tayyip Erdoğan claimed that Vural Arıkan was drunk when he was serving at the Parliament. Türkan Arıkan, sister of Vural Arıkan, sued him for compensation in 2001 and won the case in January 2004. She donated the 5 billion Turkish lira compensation to the Turkish army and Turkish Education Foundation.

== Personal life and death ==
Arıkan was married and had one child. He had a good command of French and German. He died on 3 August 1993.
