= Abdülkadir Aksu =

Turkish politician (born 1944)

Minister of the Interior
- In office 19 November 2002 – 7 May 2007
- Prime Minister: Abdullah Gül; Recep Tayyip Erdoğan
- Preceded by: Muzaffer Ecemiş
- Succeeded by: Osman Güneş
- In office 31 March 1989 – 24 November 1991
- Prime Minister: Turgut Özal; Yıldırım Akbulut; Mesut Yılmaz
- Preceded by: Mustafa Kalemli
- Succeeded by: Mustafa Kalemli

Minister of state (Responsible for Southeastern Anatolia Project)
- In office 6 March 1996 – 28 June 1996
- Prime Minister: Mesut Yılmaz

Member of the Grand National Assembly
- In office 18 April 1999 – 7 June 2015
- Constituency: Istanbul (III) (1999, 2002, 2007, 2011)
- In office 8 January 1996 – 18 April 1999
- Constituency: Diyarbakır (1995)
- In office 29 November 1987 – 20 October 1991
- Constituency: Diyarbakır (1987)

Personal details
- Born: October 12, 1944 (age 82) Diyarbakır, Turkey
- Party: Justice and Development Party (2001 - present); Virtue Party (1998 - 2001); Welfare Party (1996 - 1998); Motherland Party (1987 - 1996)

Abdülkadir Aksu (/ɑːbduːlˈkɑːdər ˈɑːksuː/ ahb-dool-KAH-dər AHK-soo; Turkish: [abdylkaːˈdiɾ ˈaksu]; born 1944, Diyarbakır) is a Turkish politician from Diyarbakır. He is of Kurdish origin.

He is a member of the Community of İskenderpaşa, a Turkish sufi community of Naqshbandi tariqah.

== Early life and education ==
He attended high school in Diyarbakır and in 1968 graduated with a degree in political sciences from the Ankara University. During his time at the university he became a member of the Free Thought Club which was as a counterweight to the Socialist Thought Club. The Free Thought Club was to be influential in politics as several members of its executive board became ministers in the Turkish Government. Aksu also founded the Diyarbakır Association in Ankara, aimed as an organization to connect the people of Diyarbakır.

== Professional career ==
Since his graduation, he entered the public administration and was assigned as a Kaymakam in a variety of districts. In 1985, while being the Kaymakam of Gaziantep, he was bequested with the award of the Bureaucrat of the Year.

== Political career ==
He was elected a member of the Grand National Assembly of Turkey, representing Diyarbakir for the Motherland Party (ANAP) in 1987. He became the Minister of the Interior in 1989 in the Government of Turgut Özal which he stayed also through the Government of Yilidirm Akbulut. During his membership in the ANAP, he was a prominent advocate of Özals conciliatory policies dubbed as the "Politics of Four Inclinations". He was again elected to parliament for Diyarbakır in the parliamentary election of 1995. He then left the Motherland Party, and joined the Welfare Party (RP), for which he served as a member of the administrative board. After the ban of the RP in 1998, he became a member of the Virtue Party which was a predecessor of the Justice and Development Party (AKP). For the AKP, he served as the Interior Minister from 2002 to 2007 and became its party vice-chair in replacement of Dengir Mir Mehmet Firat in 2008. In May 2019 he was assigned the post of the chair of the state-owned Vakifbank.

== Personal life ==
He is married and is the father of two children.

Political offices
Preceded by Mustafa Kalemli	Minister of the Interior; 1989–1991	Succeeded by Mustafa Kalemli
Preceded by Muzaffer Ecemiş	Minister of the Interior; 2002–2007	Succeeded by Osman Güneş
