= Hüsnü Doğan =

Turkish politician

38th Minister of National Defense
- In office 28 October 1990 – 22 February 1991
- President: Turgut Özal
- Prime Minister: Yıldırım Akbulut
- Preceded by: Safa Giray
- Succeeded by: Mehmet Yazar

Personal details
- Born: 1944 Malatya, Turkey
- Party: Motherland Party
- Other political affiliations: New Party
- Education: Middle East Technical University

Hüsnü Doğan (born 1944) is a Turkish former politician who served as the 38th minister of National Defense from 28 October 1990 to 22 February 1991. He entered into the political race in the Grand National Assembly after serving as deputy of Istanbul. He also served as minister of State in the 47th government of Turkey and minister of Agriculture and Forestry.

== Biography ==
Doğan was born in Malatya in 1944. He received his early schooling in his hometown and graduated from Middle East Technical University with civil engineering in 1969. He worked at State Planning Organization as a researcher until 1973. He later joined Foreign Investment Board in 1980 and became its chairperson. He played a central role in establishing the Motherland Party

He joined the Ministry of Agriculture and Forestry in the 45th government of Turkey. After he was elected as defense minister, he was removed from the ministry for his role in opposing government of Semra Özal as the Istanbul head. He later resigned from the Motherland Party after Mesut Yılmaz won the election.

On 7 October 1993, after Yusuf Bozkurt co-founded the New Party with Özal. He returned to Motherland Party soon after co-founding the New Part.
