= Güneş Taner =

Turkish politician (born 1949)

Minister of State responsible for Economy
- In office 30 June 1997 – 25 November 1998
- Prime Minister: Mesut Yılmaz

Minister of National Defense
- In office 19 October 1990 – 28 October 1990
- Prime Minister: Yıldırım Akbulut
- Preceded by: Safa Giray
- Succeeded by: Hüsnü Doğan

Personal details
- Born: 14 November 1949 (age 76) Istanbul, Turkey
- Party: Motherland Party (ANAP)
- Children: 2
- Education: Yıldız Technical University; Istanbul University; New York Poly

Güneş Taner (born 14 November 1949) is a Turkish politician and former government minister.

== Early life ==
Güneş Taner was born in Istanbul to Cengiz Tahir Taner and his wife Süheyla on 14 November 1949.

He was educated in civil engineering at Yıldız Technical University, and literature at Faculty of Letters in Istanbul University. He received a master's degree in Industrial administration from State University of New York Polytechnic Institute. He has an honorary doctor title awarded by Plekhanov Russian University of Economics.

Taner was an executive at Citibank.

== Politics career ==
He served as politics advisor to the prime minister, and was among the founders of the Motherland Party (Turkish: Anavatan Partisi, ANAP). He was elected to the parliament four times in 1987, 1991, 1995 and 1999 general elections representing Istanbul Province.

In 1990, Taner was appointed placeholder for the post of Minister of National Defense in the Yıldırım Akbulut cabinet, and was in office for a short term from 19 to 28 October. In the cabinet of Mesut Yılmaz, he served as Minister of State responsible for Economy between 30 June 1997 and 25 November 1998.

== Türkbank scandal and trial ==
Turkey's first private bank, the Türk Ticaret Banksaı, aka Türkbank, went under control of the Treasury in May 1994 following its weakening as a result of the Turkish financial crisis, which blew up in January the same year. The bank's majority stake were taken over by the Savings Deposit Insurance Fund of Turkey (Turkish: Tasarruf Mevduatı Sigorta Fonu, TMSF) for sale in a public tender.

Self-made businessman Korkmaz Yiğit won the tender offering US$600 million. However, a recording tape containing a private conversation of him with the mob boss Alaattin Çakıcı about the tender became public, and caused a scandal. The scandal spread over to the politics when Yiğit gave in his testimony details about his connections with Prime Minister Mesut Yılmaz and Minister responsible for Economy Güneş Taner relating to the tender. Yiğit claimed that "Yılmaz and Taner encouraged him to buy Türkbank, and offered him loans from other state banks to ensure that his bid was the highest".

The tender was annulled, Çakıcı and Yiğit were arrested. The coalition cabinet led by Yılmaz fell down by a motion of no confidence on 11 January 1999. A parliamentary investigative report, which accused Yılmaz and Güneş for conspiring to rig bids on tender, became obsolete due to nearing general election in 1999. After the general election in 2002, a new parliamentary investigation committee confirmed the accusations against both the politicians, and proposed to send them to the Constitutional Court of Turkey (Turkish: Yüce Divan) for trial. The supreme court concluded on 23 June 2006 that Yılmaz and Taner are guilty of bid rigging as per Turkish Penal Code's Article 765 Section 205. However, the sentences were reprieved in accordance with applicable laws.

Political offices
Preceded by	Minister of State responsible for Economy; 30 March 1999 - 23 June 1991	Succeeded by
Preceded by Safa Giray	Minister of National Defense placeholder 19 October 1990 - 28 October 1990	Succeeded by Hüsnü Doğan
