= Citizen's Party (Turkey) =

Political party

Citizen's Party (Turkish: Vatandaş Partisi) was a former political party in Turkey.

The founder of the party was Vural Arıkan who was the minister of finance in the 45th government of Turkey between 13 December 1983 - 26 October 1984. Following interparty strife, he resigned from the Motherland Party on 17 May 1985 and founded the Citizen's Party on 18 March 1986. There were only two deputies of the party; Vural Arıkan (İstanbul deputy) and his sister Turkan Arıkan (Edirne deputy). After the defeat in the 1986 by-elections however, the party dissolved itself on 2 December 1986, and Arıkan joined the True Path Party.
