= 55th government of Turkey =

Government of the Republic of Turkey (1997-1999)

The 55th government of Turkey (30 June 1997 – 11 January 1999) was a coalition government led by Mesut Yılmaz of Motherland Party (ANAP). Coalition partners with Motherland Party were Democratic Left Party (DSP) and Democrat Turkey Party (DTP). The government was nicknamed Anasol-D, where "Ana" refers to ANAP, sol (left) refers to DSP, and D refers to DTP.

== Background ==
After the collapse of the 54th government, 55th government was formed by ANAP and DSP, which were the opposition parties during the 54th government. DTP, which was founded by a group of MPs exiting DYP, also joined the coalition. Although they still could not form a majority, Republican People's Party (CHP) promised to support the coalition without participating in the government.

== The government ==
In the list below, the serving period of cabinet members who served only a part of the cabinet's lifespan are shown in the column "Notes".

Title	Name	Party	Notes
Prime Minister	Mesut Yılmaz	ANAP	
Deputy Prime Minister	Bülent Ecevit	DSP	
Deputy Prime Minister and Ministry of National Defense	İsmet Sezgin	DTP	
Minister of State
Minister of State	Güneş Taner	ANAP	30 June 1997 – 25 November 1998
Minister of State	Hüsamettin Özkan	DSP	
Minister of State	Yücel Seçkiner	ANAP	
Minister of State	Işılay Saygın	ANAP	
Minister of State	Hikmet Sami Türk	DSP	
Minister of State	Salih Yıldırım	ANAP	
Minister of State	Rifat Serdaroğlu	DTP	
Minister of State	Metin Gürdere	ANAP	
Minister of State	Şükrü Sina Gürel	DSP	
Minister of State	Ahat Andica	ANAP	
Minister of State	Işın Çelebi	ANAP	
Minister of State	Mustafa Yılmaz	DSP	
Minister of State	Rifaeddin Şahin	DTP	30 June 1997 – 21 September 1998
Minister of State	Burhan Kara	ANAP	
Minister of State	Cavit Kavak	ANAP	
Minister of State	Eyüp Aşık; Yıldırım Aktuna	ANAP	30 June 1997 – 1 October 1998; 5 October 1998 – 11 January 1999
Minister of State	Kazım Rüştü Yücelen	ANAP	
Minister of State	Hasan Gemici	DSP	
Minister of State	Mehmet Batalı	DTP	
Ministry of Justice	Oltan Sungurlu; Hasan Denizkırdu	ANAP; Indep	30 June 1997 – 4 August 1998; 4 August 1998 – 11 January 1999
Ministry of the Interior	Murat Başeskioğlu; Kutlu Aktaş	ANAP; Indep	30 June 1997 – 4 August 1998; 4 August 1998 – 11 January 1999
Ministry of Foreign Affairs	İsmail Cem	DSP	
Ministry of Finance	Zekeriya Temizel	DSP	
Ministry of National Education	Hikmet Uluğbay	DSP	
Ministry of Public Works	Yaşar Topçu	ANAP	
Ministry of Health and Social Security	Halil İbrahim Özsoy	ANAP	
Ministry of Agriculture and Village Affairs	Mustafa Taşar	ANAP	
Ministry of Transport	Necdet Menzir; Ahmet Denizolgun	DTP; Indep	30 June 1997 – 4 August 1998; 4 August 1998 – 11 January 1999
Ministry of Labour and Social Security	Nami Çağan	DSP	
Ministry of Industry and Commerce	Yalım Erez	Indep	
Ministry Tourism	İbrahim Gürdal	ANAP	
Ministry Culture	İstemihan Talay	DSP	
Ministry of Environment	İmren Aykut	ANAP	
Ministry of Energy and Natural Resources	Cumhur Ersümer	ANAP	
Ministry of Forestry	Ersin Taranoğlu	ANAP	

== Aftermath ==
The cabinet collapsed on 11 January 1999, as a result of the Türkbank scandal in 1998, which involved relationships between the government, the private sector and organized crime. CHP decided to end its support after the scandal.

Preceded by 54th government of Turkey (Necmettin Erbakan)	55th Government of Turkey; 30 June 1997 – 11 January 1999	Succeeded by 56th government of Turkey (Bülent Ecevit)
