= Ali Bozer =

Turkish politician (1925–2020)

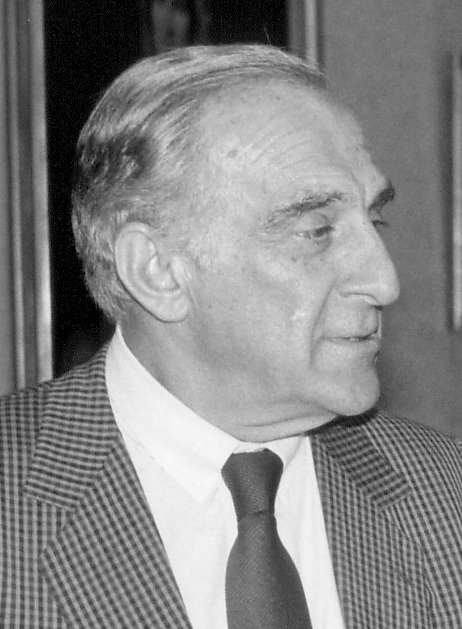

Acting Prime Minister of Turkey
- In office 31 October 1989 – 9 November 1989
- President: Kenan Evren
- Preceded by: Turgut Özal
- Succeeded by: Yıldırım Akbulut

Minister of Foreign Affairs
- In office 22 February 1990 – 12 October 1990
- President: Turgut Özal
- Preceded by: Mesut Yılmaz
- Succeeded by: Ahmet Kurtcebe Alptemoçin

Member of the Grand National Assembly
- In office 6 November 1983 – 20 October 1991
- Constituency: Ankara (1983); Mersin (1987)

Personal details
- Born: 28 July 1925 Ankara, Turkey
- Died: 30 September 2020 (aged 95) Ankara, Turkey
- Resting place: Karşıyaka Cemetery
- Party: Nationalist Democracy Party (1983-1986); ANAP (1986-1991)
- Children: Ahmet Bozer
- Education: Ankara University (LLB); Neuchâtel University (PhD)
- Profession: Politician

Ali Hüsrev Bozer (28 July 1925 – 30 September 2020) was a Turkish politician and academic of commercial law.

== Biography ==
Bozer was born in Ankara, Turkey. At first a member of the Nationalist Democracy Party (MDP), then of the Motherland Party (ANAP), he served as Deputy Prime Minister in the Turgut Özal's and Yıldırım Akbulut's cabinets and was Minister of Foreign Affairs. He was one of the founders of Oyak-Renault, automotive company in Turkey (1969) and served as chairman of the board of Oyak-Renault from 1991 to 1995.

Bozer was the father of Coca-Cola Eurasia Group President Ahmet Bozer. He died on 30 September 2020, after contracting COVID-19 during the COVID-19 pandemic in Turkey. He was laid to rest two days later, at Karşıyaka Cemetery in Ankara.

Political offices
Preceded by Kaya Erdem	Deputy Prime Minister of Turkey; 30 March 1989 – 21 February 1990	Succeeded by Ekrem Pakdemirli
Preceded by Mesut Yılmaz	Minister of Foreign Affairs; 21 February 1990 – 12 October 1990	Succeeded by Ahmet Kurtcebe Alptemoçin
Preceded by Turgut Özal	Prime Minister of Turkey; 31 October 1989 – 9 November 1989	Succeeded by Yıldırım Akbulut
