= Mehmet Bekaroğlu =

Turkish politician

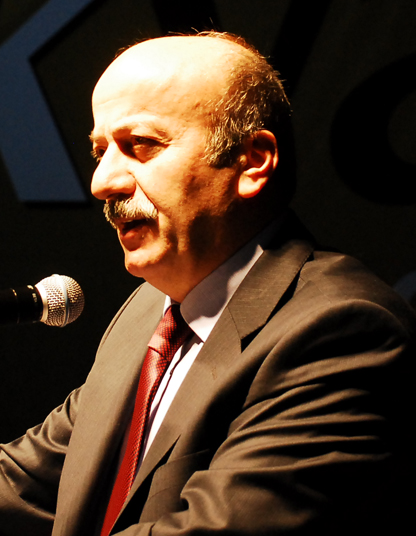

Deputy leader of the Republican People's Party
- In office 7 September 2014 – 24 January 2016
- Leader: Kemal Kılıçdaroğlu
- Preceded by: Emel Yıldırım
- Succeeded by: Yasemin Öney Cankurtaran

Deputy leader of the People's Voice Party
- In office 1 November 2010 – 19 September 2012
- Leader: Numan Kurtulmuş
- Preceded by: Position established
- Succeeded by: Position abolished

Member of the Grand National Assembly
- In office 7 June 2015 – 3 June 2023
- Constituency: İstanbul (III) (June 2015, Nov 2015, 2018)
- In office 18 April 1999 – 3 November 2002
- Constituency: Rize (1999)

Personal details
- Born: 25 June 1954 (age 71) Fındıklı, Rize, Turkey
- Party: Welfare Party; Virtue Party; Felicity Party; People's Voice Party; Republican People's Party
- Occupation: lawyer
- Known for: Human rights activist

Mehmet Bekaroğlu (born in 1954) is a Turkish human rights activist, a scientist, professor, a psychiatrist, a writer, and a politician of Laz origin. He was well known in the Turkish Parliament by his actions against tortures at jails. He took part in the Human Rights Commission in the parliament.

Bekaroğlu was elected to Parliament in the 1999 general election as a Member for Rize, but lost his seat in 2002 after the Virtue Party won less than the 10% parliamentary threshold. After the Virtue Party was closed down in 2001, he joined the Felicity Party and became its deputy leader. After resigning from the party, he formed an 'Islamic left' alliance with Ertuğrul Günay who resigned from the Republican People's Party (CHP) in 2004. However, this new movement failed to take hold after Günay joined the Justice and Development Party (AKP). In 2010, he became the deputy leader of the People's Voice Party (HAS Party) founded by Numan Kurtulmuş. When the HAS Party decided to merge with the AKP in 2012, Bekaroğlu decided not to take part in the merger and resigned from the party. He was the Felicity Party candidate for the Istanbul Metropolitan Mayoralty in the 2009 local elections and the Felicity Party candidate for the Rize Mayoralty in the 2014 local elections.

In September 2014, CHP leader Kemal Kılıçdaroğlu invited Bekaroğlu to become a member of his party as part of an attempt to expand the party's appeal to conservative voters. Bekaroğlu subsequently joined the CHP and became a member of the party council, becoming a deputy leader of the party. In the 2014 presidential election, he was suggested by CHP parliamentary group leader Muharrem İnce as a possible candidate.

On 16 November 2023 during the ongoing Gaza war, he compared Hamas to Kuva-yi Milliye on his X account against designations of the group as a terrorist organisation.
