= Mustafa Kalemli =

19th Speaker of the Parliament of Turkey

Dr. Mustafa Kalemli

19th Speaker of the Grand National Assembly
- In office January 25, 1996 – September 30, 1997
- President: Süleyman Demirel
- Preceded by: İsmet Sezgin
- Succeeded by: Hikmet Çetin

Minister of Forest
- In office August 26, 1991 – November 20, 1991
- Prime Minister: Mesut Yılmaz
- Preceded by: İlker Tuncay
- Succeeded by: Vefa Tanır

Minister of the Interior
- In office December 22, 1987 – March 30, 1989
- Prime Minister: Turgut Özal
- Preceded by: Abdülkadir Aksu
- Succeeded by: Sabahattin Çakmakoğlu

Minister of the Interior
- In office June 23, 1991 – August 26, 1991
- Prime Minister: Mesut Yılmaz
- Preceded by: Ahmet Selçuk
- Succeeded by: Abdülkadir Aksu

Minister of Health and Social Aid
- In office October 17, 1986 – December 21, 1987
- Prime Minister: Turgut Özal
- Preceded by: Mehmet Aydın
- Succeeded by: Bülent Akarcalı

Minister of Labor and Social Security
- In office December 14, 1983 – October 17, 1986
- Prime Minister: Turgut Özal
- Preceded by: Turhan Esener
- Succeeded by: Mükerrem Taşçıoğlu

Personal details
- Born: March 26, 1943 (age 83) Tavşanlı, Kütahya Province, Turkey
- Party: Motherland Party (ANAP)
- Education: Ankara University
- Occupation: Politician
- Profession: Physician

Mustafa Kalemli (born March 26, 1943) is a Turkish physician and politician, who served as government minister and Speaker of the Turkish Grand National Assembly.

== Early life and career ==
Mustafa Kalemli was born in Tavşanlı, Kütahya Province, Turkey.

Mustafa Kalemli went to the primary and secondary school in Tavşanlı, and finished the high school in Eskişehir. After graduating from the Faculty of Medicine at Ankara University in 1967, he was admitted as an assistant in the same university's Institute of Urology. In 1972, Kalemli became a specialist physician in urology. Between 1976 and 1978, he served in various positions at the Ministry of Health. In 1978, he conducted research work in the field of andrology and renal transplant at the Eppendorf Hospital of Hamburg University in then West Germany.

Mustafa Kalemli helped co-found the Akdeniz University in Antalya, and headed the Institut of Urology there after he became an associate professor at Ankara University in 1978.

Co-founding the Tavşanlı Social Security Hospital, he served as its chief physician. In 1983, Kalemli headed the urology clinic at the Buca Hospital.

== Politics ==
Entered politics, he joined the newly established Motherland Party (ANAP). Kalemli was elected into the parliament as a deputy of Kütahya after the 1983 general elections held on November 6. He served between December 14, 1983 – October 17, 1986 as Minister of Labor and Social Security and between October 17, 1986 – December 21, 1987 as Minister of Health and Social Aid in the cabinet of Turgut Özal.

He was re-elected in the 1987 general elections held on October 29 for the second time as a deputy of Kütahya. He was appointed Minister of the Interior serving between December 22, 1987 – March 30, 1989.

In the cabinet of Mesut Yılmaz, he served a second time as the Minister of the Interior from June 24, 1991 until August 26, 1991, when he was appointed to the newly established Ministry of Forest. He served at this post until November 20, 1991.

Mustafa Kalemli was re-elected in the 1995 general elections held on December 24. On January 25, 1996, the parliament elected him speaker, a position he held until September 30, 1997.

== Personal life ==
Mustafa Kalemli is married and has two daughters, including Şebnem Kalemli.

== Honor ==
A hospital in Tavşanlı is named after him.

Political offices
| Preceded by Turhan Esener | Minister of Labor and Social Security; December 14, 1983–October 17, 1986 | Succeeded by Mükerrem Taşçıoğlu |
| Preceded by Mehmet Aydın | Minister of Health and Social Aid; October 17, 1986–December 21, 1987 | Succeeded by Bülent Akarcalı |
| Preceded by Abdülkadir Aksu; Ahmet Selçuk | Minister of the Interior; December 22, 1987–March 30, 1989; June 23, 1991–August 26, 1991 | Succeeded by Sabahattin Çakmakoğlu; Abdülkadir Aksu |
| Preceded by İlker Tuncay | Minister of Forest; August 26, 1991–November 20, 1991 | Succeeded by Vefa Tanır |
| Preceded by İsmet Sezgin | Speaker of the Parliament of Turkey; January 25, 1996–September 30, 1997 | Succeeded by Hikmet Çetin |
