= Yozgat (electoral district) =

Electoral district for the Grand National Assembly of Turkey

Coordinates: 39°35′N 35°20′E

- electoral district for the Grand National Assembly of Turkey
- Yozgat shown within Turkey
- Province: Yozgat
- Electorate: 257,313

Current electoral district
- Created: 1920
- Seats: 4 Historical: 6 (1995–2011) 5 (1983–1991) 6 (1961–1983) 9 (1957–1961) 8 (1954–1957)
- MPs: List: Abdülkadir Akgül AKP Ertuğrul Soysal AKP Yusuf Başer AKP Sadir Durmaz MHP
- Turnout at last election: 82.17%
- Representation
- AK Party: 2 / 4
- MHP: 1 / 4
- İYİ: 1 / 4

Yozgat is an electoral district of the Grand National Assembly of Turkey. It elects 4 members of parliament (deputies) to represent the province of the same name for a four-year term by the D'Hondt method, a party-list proportional representation system.

== Members ==
Population reviews of each electoral district are conducted before each general election, which can lead to certain districts being granted a smaller or greater number of parliamentary seats. Yozgat's seat allocation has fluctuated from a historical high of 9 seats in the 1950s to four seats today, its lowest level of representation to date.

MPs for Yozgat, 1999 onwards
| Seat | 1999 (21st parliament) | 2002 (22nd parliament) | 2007 (23rd parliament) | 2011 (24th parliament) | June 2015 (25th parliament) |
| MP | Lütfullah Kayalar; Anavatan | Bekir Bozdağ; AK Party | | | Abdulkadir Akgül; AK Party |
| MP | İlyas Arslan; FP | Mehmet Çiçek; AK Party | | Ertuğrul Soysal; AK Party | |
| MP | İlyas Arslan; FP | İlyas Arslan; AK Party | Abdülkadir Akgül; AK Party | Yusuf Başer; AK Party | |
| MP | Ahmet Erol Ersoy; MHP | Emin Koç; CHP | Mehmet Ekici; MHP | Sadir Durmaz; MHP | |
| MP | Mesut Türker; MHP | Mehmet Erdemir; AK Party | Osman Coşkun; AK Party | Seat abolished | |
| MP | Şuayip Üşenmez; MHP | Mehmet Yaşar Öztürk; AK Party | | Seat abolished | |

== General elections ==
=== 2011 ===
2011 Turkish general election: Yozgat
| List | Candidates | Votes | Of total (%) | ± from prev. |
|---|---|---|---|---|
| AK Party | Bekir Bozdağ, Ertuğrul Soysal, Yusuf Başer | 170,919 | 66.42 | |
| MHP | Sadir Durmaz | 47,062 | 18.29 | |
| CHP | None elected | 28,166 | 10.95 | |
| Büyük Birlik | None elected | 3205 | 1.25 | |
| SAADET | None elected | 2806 | 1.09 | |
| HAS Party | None elected | 2520 | 0.98 | N/A |
| DP | None elected | 1091 | 0.42 | |
| DYP | None elected | 405 | 0.16 | |
| Nationalist Conservative | None elected | 260 | 0.1 | |
| DSP | None elected | 253 | 0.1 | '"`UNIQ−−ref−0000000D−QINU`"' |
| Labour | None elected | 253 | 0.1 | |
| TKP | None elected | 159 | 0.06 | |
| MP | None elected | 130 | 0.05 | |
| Liberal Democrat | None elected | 84 | 0.03 | |
| HEPAR | None elected | | 0 | |
| Turnout | | 257,313 | 82.17 | |

=== June 2015 ===
| Abbr. | Party | Votes | % |
|---|---|---|---|
| AKP | Justice and Development Party | 139,934 | 58.3% |
| MHP | Nationalist Movement Party | 66,958 | 27.9% |
| CHP | Republican People's Party | 21,626 | 9% |
| SP | Felicity Party | 6,054 | 2.5% |
| HDP | Peoples' Democratic Party | 2,298 | 1% |
| | Other | 3,130 | 1.3% |
| Total | | 240,000 | |
| Turnout | | 81.61 | |
source: YSK

=== November 2015 ===
| Abbr. | Party | Votes | % |
|---|---|---|---|
| AKP | Justice and Development Party | 157,622 | 64.8% |
| MHP | Nationalist Movement Party | 30,374 | 12.5% |
| | Independent Lütfullah Kayalar | 28,664 | 11.8% |
| CHP | Republican People's Party | 17,904 | 7.4% |
| SP | Felicity Party | 1,259 | 0.5% |
| HDP | Peoples' Democratic Party | 1,202 | 0.5% |
| | Other | 6,124 | 2.5% |
| Total | | 243,149 | |
| Turnout | | 83.56 | |
source: YSK

=== 2018 ===
| Abbr. | Party | Votes | % |
|---|---|---|---|
| AKP | Justice and Development Party | 131,340 | 52.3% |
| MHP | Nationalist Movement Party | 62,006 | 24.7% |
| CHP | Republican People's Party | 28,575 | 11.4% |
| IYI | Good Party | 18,727 | 7.5% |
| SP | Felicity Party | 2,966 | 1.2% |
| HDP | Peoples' Democratic Party | 2,100 | 0.8% |
| | Other | 5,490 | 2.2% |
| Total | | 251,204 | |
| Turnout | | 86.42 | |
source: YSK

== Presidential elections ==
=== 2014 ===
Presidential Election 2014: Yozgat
| Party | Candidate | Votes | % |
|---|---|---|---|
| AK Party | Recep Tayyip Erdoğan | 155,728 | 65.84 |
| Independent | Ekmeleddin İhsanoğlu | 78,565 | 33.22 |
| HDP | Selahattin Demirtaş | 2,240 | 0.95 |
| Total votes | | 236,533 | 100.00 |
| Rejected ballots | | 2,670 | 1.53 |
| Turnout | | 240,203 | 78.97 |
| Recep Tayyip Erdoğan win | | | |
