= Hikmet Çetin =

20th Speaker of the Parliament of Turkey

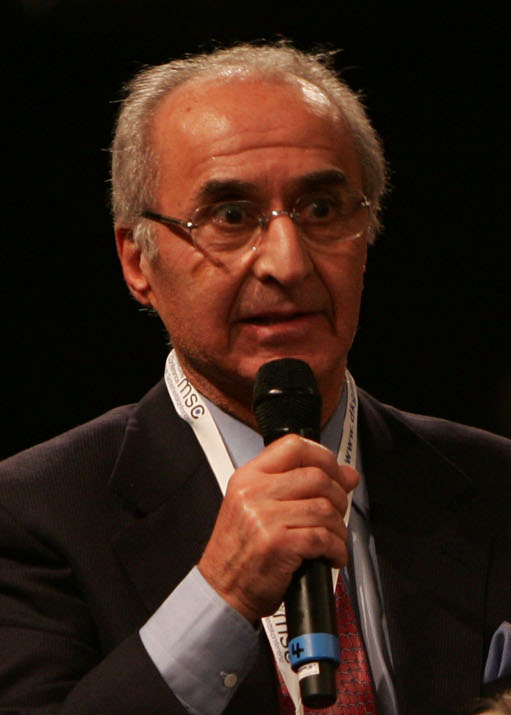
- Çetin in 2011

1st NATO Senior Civilian Representative in Afghanistan
- In office 9 November 2003 – 24 August 2006
- Succeeded by: Daan W. Everts

Speaker of the Grand National Assembly
- In office 16 October 1997 – 18 April 1999
- President: Süleyman Demirel
- Preceded by: Mustafa Kalemli
- Succeeded by: Yıldırım Akbulut

Leader of the Republican People's Party
- In office 18 February 1995 – 9 September 1995
- Preceded by: Deniz Baykal
- Succeeded by: Deniz Baykal

Deputy Prime Minister of Turkey
- In office 27 March 1995 – 5 October 1995
- Prime Minister: Tansu Çiller
- Preceded by: Murat Karayalçın
- Succeeded by: Deniz Baykal
- In office 3 October 1978 – 12 November 1979 Serving with Orhan Eyüboğlu and Faruk Sükan
- Prime Minister: Bülent Ecevit
- Preceded by: Turhan Feyzioğlu
- Succeeded by: Turgut Özal

Minister of Foreign Affairs
- In office 21 November 1991 – 27 July 1994
- Prime Minister: Süleyman Demirel
- Preceded by: Safa Giray
- Succeeded by: Mümtaz Soysal

Member of the Grand National Assembly
- In office 29 November 1987 – 18 April 1999
- Constituency: Gaziantep (1991, 1995); Diyarbakır (1987)
- In office 5 June 1977 – 12 September 1980
- Constituency: İstanbul (1977)

Personal details
- Born: 10 August 1937 (age 89) Lice, Diyarbakır Province, Turkey
- Party: Party for Change (2020–2023)
- Other political affiliations: Republican People's Party (1955–1980; 1995–2020); SHP (1983–1995)
- Spouse: İnci Cetin
- Children: 2
- Education: Ankara University (BA); Williams College (MA)
- Profession: Economist

Hikmet Çetin (born 10 August 1937) is a Turkish retired politician of Kurdish origin. He held various national posts during his career, including Foreign Affairs Minister (1991–1994) and Speaker of the Grand National Assembly (1997–1999). In November 2003, he was appointed NATO's inaugural Senior Civilian Representative in Afghanistan.

== Early life ==
He was born in Lice, a town in the southeastern Diyarbakır Province. After completing primary school in his hometown and high school in Ankara, he graduated in 1960 with a B.A. degree in Economics and Finance from Ankara University's School of Political Sciences.

After completing his education, Hikmet Çetin joined the State Planning Organization (Turkish: Devlet Planlama Teşkilatı, DPT). Shortly after, he was sent abroad and also to the United States, where he received his M.A. in "Economics of development" from Williams College in Williamstown, Massachusetts, USA. In 1968, he did research work on "Planning models" at the Stanford University, California, USA. After returning home, he completed his military service in 1970 and worked as the head of Economics Planning Department at the DPT until 1977. During this time, he was a part-time lecturer at the Middle East Technical University in Ankara.

== Political career ==
Hikmet Çetin stepped into politics in the 1977 general elections as deputy of Istanbul from the Republican People's Party (CHP). Between 1978 and 1979, he served as Minister of State and later as Deputy Prime Minister in the cabinet of the Prime Minister Bülent Ecevit. Following the 1980 military coup that banned the existing political parties, Hikmet Çetin became an advisor in planning to the Government of Yemen.

He returned to politics following his election to the parliament in 1987 as deputy of Diyarbakır from the Social Democratic Populist Party (Turkish: Sosyal Demokrat Halkçı Parti, SHP), the successor of the banned Republican People's Party. He served in the board of SHP and became its Secretary General. Hikmet Çetin was elected in 1991 for the third time to Parliament as deputy of Gaziantep from SHP.

He was appointed in 1991 Minister of Foreign Affairs in the coalition cabinet of Prime Minister Süleyman Demirel. He kept his seat in the coalition cabinet of Tansu Çiller, who took over the government leadership from Demirel after his rise to the Presidency. Hikmet Çetin resigned from his post on 27 July 1994.

In 1995, the two left wing parties, SHP and CHP decided to merge, and their general assemblies agreed on the leadership of Hikmet Çetin. He was elected chairman on 18 February 1995. At the party convention held on 9 September 1995 he did not run for the chair of the Republican People's Party again, and resigned.

Hikmet Çetin retook his seat in the Parliament in the 1995 general elections and was elected as the Speaker of the Parliament on 16 October 1997 and occupied this position until 18 April 1999.

== Diplomatic duty ==
He was appointed on 19 November 2003 as NATO Secretary General's first Senior Civilian Representative in Afghanistan, the highest-level political representative of NATO in this country, where it has held the command of the International Security Assistance Force (ISAF) since 11 August 2003. On 26 January 2004 he took office in Kabul, and served two consecutive terms until 24 August 2006.

== After politics ==
Since 2013, Çetin has been a Member of the Global Leadership Foundation, chaired by FW de Klerk, an organisation that works to support democratic leadership, prevent and resolve conflict through mediation and promote good governance in the form of democratic institutions, open markets, human rights and the rule of law. It does so by making available, discreetly and in confidence, the experience of former leaders to today’s national leaders. It is a not-for-profit organisation composed of former heads of government, senior governmental and international organization officials who work closely with heads of government on governance-related issues of concern to them.

== Personal life ==
Hikmet Çetin is of Kurdish descent, and is married to İnci Çetin, and they have two children.

== See also ==
- List of Turkish diplomats

Political offices
Preceded by Necmettin Erbakan; Alparslan Türkeş	Deputy Prime Minister of Turkey; 3 October 1978–12 November 1979	Succeeded by Zeyyat Baykara; Turgut Özal
Preceded by Safa Giray	Minister of Foreign Affairs of Turkey; 21 November 1991–27 July 1994	Succeeded by Mümtaz Soysal
Preceded by Murat Karayalçın	Deputy Prime Minister of Turkey; 27 March 1995–5 October 1995	Succeeded by Deniz Baykal
Preceded by Mustafa Kalemli	Speaker of the Parliament of Turkey; 16 October 1997–18 April 1999	Succeeded by Yıldırım Akbulut
Party political offices
Preceded by Deniz Baykal	Leader of the Republican's People Party; 18 February 1995–9 September 1995	Succeeded by Deniz Baykal
Diplomatic posts
Preceded by newly established	NATO Senior Civilian Representative in Afghanistan; 19 November 2003–24 August 2006	Succeeded by (Netherlands) Daan W. Everts
