= Coup by Memorandum =

Coup by Memorandum may refer to:

- 1971 Turkish coup d'état
- 1997 Turkish coup d'état (the "Postmodern coup")
