= Rize (electoral district) =

Electoral district for the Grand National Assembly of Turkey

Coordinates: 41°00′N 41°00′E

- electoral district for the Grand National Assembly of Turkey
- Rize shown within Turkey
- Province: Rize
- Electorate: 196,854

Current electoral district
- Created: 1920
- Seats: 3 Historical: 4 (1995-1999) 3 (1991-1995) 4 (1961-1991) 6 (1954-1961)
- MPs: List: Hayati Yazıcı AK Party Hasan Karal AK Party Nusret Bayraktar AK Party
- Turnout at last election: 87.96%
- Representation
- AK Party: 2 / 3
- CHP: 1 / 3

Rize is an electoral district of the Grand National Assembly of Turkey. It elects three members of parliament (deputies) to represent the province of the same name for a four-year term by the D'Hondt method, a party-list proportional representation system.

== Members ==
Population reviews of each electoral district are conducted before each general election, which can lead to certain districts being granted a smaller or greater number of parliamentary seats.

As a small electoral district, Rize's seat allocation has oscillated between three and four seats over the last two decades.

Rize was the district from which former prime minister Mesut Yılmaz was elected, first for his Anavatan and later as an independent.

MPs for Rize, 1999 onwards
Seat	1999 (21st parliament)	2002 (22nd parliament)	2007 (23rd parliament)	2011 (24th parliament)	June 2015 (25th parliament)
MP	Mesut Yılmaz; Motherland	Abdülkadir Kart; AK Party	Mesut Yılmaz; Independent	Hayati Yazıcı; AK Party	Hikmet Ayar; AK Party
MP	Ahmet Kabil; Motherland	İlyas Çakır; AK Party	Bayram Ali Bayramoğlu; AK Party	Hasan Karal; AK Party	
MP	Mehmet Bekaroğlu; Virtue	İmdat Sütlüoğlu; AK Party	Lütfi Çırakoğlu; AK Party	Nusret Bayraktar; AK Party	Osman Aşkın Bak; AK Party

== General elections ==
=== 2011 ===
2011 Turkish general election: Rize
List	Candidates	Votes	Of total (%)	± from prev.
AK Party	Hayati Yazıcı, Hasan Karal, Nusret Bayraktar	134,549	68.91	
CHP	None elected	33,408	17.11	
MHP	None elected	14,929	7.65	
SAADET	None elected	6241	3.20	
HAS Party	None elected	1743	0.89	
DP	None elected	1142	0.58	
Büyük Birlik	None elected	806	0.41	
Independent	None elected	679	0.35	
HEPAR	None elected	481	0.25	
DSP	None elected	348	0.18	'"`UNIQ−−ref−0000000D−QINU`"'
Labour	None elected	239	0.12	
DYP	None elected	206	0.11	
Nationalist Conservative	None elected	184	0.09	
TKP	None elected	157	0.08	
Liberal Democrat	None elected	79	0.04	
MP	None elected	66	0.03	
Turnout		195,257	85.06	

=== June 2015 ===
Abbr.	Party	Votes	%
AK Party	Justice and Development Party	131,168	66.8%
CHP	Republican People's Party	37,110	18.9%
MHP	Nationalist Movement Party	15,870	8.1%
SP	Felicity Party	6,798	3.5%
	Other	5,526	2.8%
Total		196,472	
Turnout		82.36	
source: YSK

=== November 2015 ===
Abbr.	Party	Votes	%
AK Party	Justice and Development Party	152,923	75.9%
CHP	Republican People's Party	29,970	14.9%
MHP	Nationalist Movement Party	10,815	5.4%
SP	Felicity Party	2,997	1.5%
	Other	4,829	2.4%
Total		201,534	
Turnout		84.02	
source: YSK

=== 2018 ===
Abbr.	Party	Votes	%
AK Party	Justice and Development Party	139,948	64.3%
CHP	Republican People's Party	27,800	12.8%
MHP	Nationalist Movement Party	26,907	12.4%
IYI	Good Party	13,088	6%
SP	Felicity Party	4,096	1.9%
	Other	5,768	2.7%
Total		217,507	
Turnout		88.02	
source: YSK

== Presidential elections ==
=== 2014 ===
Presidential Election 2014: Rize
Party	Candidate	Votes	%
AK Party	Recep Tayyip Erdoğan	148,641	80.57
Independent	Ekmeleddin İhsanoğlu	33,708	18.27
HDP	Selahattin Demirtaş	2,137	1.16
Total votes		184,486	100.00
Rejected ballots		2,584	1.91
Turnout		188,070	76.61
Recep Tayyip Erdoğan win			
