= Nesrin Nas =

Turkish politician (born 1958)

Nesrin Nas (born 1958) is a Turkish female academic in economics, politician and the former leader of the Motherland Party (Anavatan Partisi, ANAP).

== Biography ==
She was born in the Central Anatolian town of Bünyan in Kayseri Province. Her father's name was Mehmet Şecaattin and her mother's was Şerife. After graduating from the Marmara University, Istanbul in economics, Nesrin Nas conducted studies on international money markets in the United Kingdom. Returned home, she earned a PhD in economics from the University of Istanbul.

Nesrin Nas became lecturer in economics at the Marmara University. and worked 13 years at this post. During this time, she served also as a consultant at the economics newspaper "Dünya". She left the university to represent some international financial organizations and newspapers in Turkey, like DC Gardner Training, Euromoney magazine and Emerging Markets newspaper. She was adviser to Capital Markets Board of the Prime Minister.

She entered politics in 1999 and was elected in the 1999 general election as deputy of Istanbul from the Motherland Party.

Nesrin Nas was elected the first female president of the Motherland Party at its convention held on 13 December 2003, succeeding Ali Talip Özdemir, who waived to run for the presidency again. She resigned from her post on 25 November 2004, following dissensions on the merger of ANAP with the True Path Party (Doğru Yol Partisi, DYP) under its leader Mehmet Ağar.

Nesrin Nas is married to the financial lawyer Adnan Nas. Together they have one child.

== See also ==
- Women in Turkish politics

Party political offices
Preceded by Ali Talip Özdemir	Leader of the Motherland Party (ANAP); 2003–2004	Succeeded by Erkan Mumcu
