= Hasan Celal Güzel =

Turkish journalist and politician (1945–2018)

Minister of Education, Youth and Sport
- In office 21 April 1987 – 30 March 1989
- President: Kenan Evren
- Preceded by: Metin Emiroğlu
- Succeeded by: Avni Akyol (Education); İsmet Özarslan (Youth and Sport)

Personal details
- Born: 1945 Gaziantep, Turkey
- Died: 19 March 2018 (aged 73) Ankara, Turkey
- Party: Motherland Party; Rebirth Party

Hasan Celal Güzel (1945 – 19 March 2018) was a Turkish journalist and politician. He was Minister of Education, Youth and Sport (1987–1989). He was leader of the Rebirth Party in the 1990s, a party he co-founded in 1992. He was a columnist for Radikal and Vatan.

== Career ==
After graduating from Ankara University with a degree in economics Güzel worked in the State Planning Organization, and then in various administrative roles in the government including in the Prime Minister's office.

In a 1986 election he was elected to the Grand National Assembly of Turkey for the Motherland Party (Turkish: Anavatan Partisi), serving as a minister of state. He was re-elected in the 1987 elections and was appointed minister of education, youth and sport (1987–1989).

On 23 November 1992, Güzel co-founded the Rebirth Party (YDP) and was elected its vice-chair. He was the leader of the party during the 1994 Turkish local elections and 1999.

In 2012 Güzel said that General Teoman Koman had approached him in September 1996 with a view to installing him or Mesut Yılmaz as prime minister after a planned coup. Güzel declined to get involved. In the event, Yılmaz was appointed prime minister after the 28 February 1997 "post-modern coup".
