= Alpaslan Pehlivanlı =

Turkish lawyer and politician (1947–1994)

Alpaslan Pehlivanlı (1947 - 14 April 1994, Kırıkkale) was a Turkish lawyer and politician, and a parliamentary deputy for the Motherland Party. He was the leader of the Justice Commission in the Grand National Assembly and deemed the legalization of the Kurdish language and the possibility of Kurdish songs being sung in coffee houses or Kurdish films being screened as separatism. He was assassinated in 1994.
