= Osman Güneş =

Turkish politician (born 1952)

- Born: 1952 (age 73–74); Yozgat, Turkey
- Occupation: Bureaucrat

Osman Güneş (born 1952, Yozgat, Turkey) is a Turkish bureaucrat. In accordance with Article 114 of the Constitution of the Republic of Turkey, he has served as neutral Minister of Interior till the 2007 general elections.

He graduated from Ankara University.

Political offices
Preceded by Abdülkadir Aksu	Minister of Interior; May 8, 2007– August 29, 2007	Succeeded by Beşir Atalay
