= Cavit Şadi Pehlivanoğlu =

Turkish politician (1927–2015)

Member of the Grand National Assembly
- In office 20 October 1991 – 24 December 1995
- In office 15 October 1961 – 12 October 1969
- Constituency: Ordu (1961, 1965, 1991)

Personal details
- Born: 1927 Fındıklı, Rize, Turkey
- Died: November 21, 2015 (aged 88)

Cavit Şadi Pehlivanoğlu (1927 – 21 November 2015) was a Turkish statesman, who served as a legislator of the Grand National Assembly of Turkey for three terms between 1961 and 1996, first as a member of Justice Party (Turkey) and then as the Vice President of Motherland Party (Turkey) that he founded together with Turgut Özal and others. He was elected from the province Ordu. He held several positions within the parliament. Both before and after his active political career, he worked as an attorney at law and a business executive for various associations. He was well known for his controversial actions and political speeches.

Pehlivanoğlu died on 21 November 2015, aged 88.
