= Avni Akyol =

Turkish educator and politician (1931–1999)

Minister of National Education of Turkey
- In office 30 March 1989 – 20 November 1991
- Prime Minister: Turgut Özal; Yıldırım Akbulut; Mesut Yılmaz
- Preceded by: Hasan Celal Güzel
- Succeeded by: Köksal Toptan

Minister of Culture of Turkey
- In office 21 July 1977 – 5 January 1978
- Prime Minister: Süleyman Demirel
- Preceded by: Rıfkı Danışman
- Succeeded by: Ahmet Taner Kışlalı

Personal details
- Born: 1931 Düzce, Turkey
- Died: September 30, 1999 (aged 68) Bolu, Turkey

Avni Akyol (1931 – September 30, 1999), Turkish educator, politician, Minister of Culture and Minister of National Education.

== Biography ==
In the general elections held in 1977, he became a Bolu deputy from the Justice Party (EP). Then II. The Ministry of Culture in the Nationalist Front Government. In 1986, the Council of Ministers was elected as a member of the Council of Higher Education. Participated in the Motherland Party founded in 1983. On March 30, 1989, Hasan Celal Güzel, the revised result of the Government of Ozal, became the Minister of National Education and continued the referendum and the three governments. (Özal Government, Akbulut Government, I. Yılmaz Government). During the period, the idea of blue aprons was introduced and realized instead of navy blue aprons. Akyol has worked very hard to be the province of Düzce. On December 24, 1995, he entered the Grand National Assembly of Turkey as a Bolu deputy and served as the Chairman of the Education Commission. After February 28, the ANASOL-D Government strived to put it directly into practice for the 8 year compulsory education decision. After the April 18, 1999, elections, parliament entered Bolu. He died of a heart attack in a hotel he had gone to for a funeral on September 30, 1999, in Bolu.

== See also ==
- List of members of the Grand National Assembly of Turkey who died in office
