= Ali Talip Özdemir =

Turkish politician (born 1953)

Ali Talip Özdemir (born 1953) is a Turkish politician and the former leader of the Motherland Party (Anavatan Partisi, ANAP).

He was born in the Central Anatolian town of Ereğli in Konya Province into a family with 12 children. His father Hüsnü Özdemir was a worker in the state-owned Sümerbank factory. Following his primary and high school education in Konya, Ali Talip Özdemir attended 1973 Ankara State Academy of Architecture and Engineering and graduated in 1977 as a mechanical engineer. He obtained his Master's degree in the same discipline in 1987.

Ali Talip Özdemir entered politics during his university years. He helped to establish the newly founded ANAP in Anatolia. In the regional election 1984, he was elected mayor of his hometown Ereğli. He served at this post two terms. In the general elections held on 29 November 1987, he quit his position as mayor, and was elected deputy of Konya from the Motherland Party into the parliament. He served also a while as the vice president of the party during the leadership of Turgut Özal.

In 1991, he became minister for the environment in cabinet of Mesut Yılmaz. In the intermediate regional elections 1992, Ali Talip Özdemir ran for the post of mayor of Bakırköy district in Istanbul, and served for two terms at this position. He reentered the parliament as deputy of Istanbul following the 1995 general election held on 24 December 1995. He served as minister for press and information in the coalition cabinet of Mesut Yılmaz in 1996.

With the resigning of Mesut Yılmaz from active politics and so from the leadership of the party that did not overcome the 10% barrier in the 2002 general election, Ali Talip Özdemir was elected the 4th president of the Motherland Party at its extraordinary congress held on 11 January 2003. In the following congress on 13 December 2003 however, he waived to run for the presidency. He was succeeded in his post by Nesrin Nas, who was elected the first female president of ANAP.

Ali Talip Özdemir is married and father of three children.

Party political offices
Preceded by Mesut Yılmaz	Leader of the Motherland Party (ANAP); Jan 2003 – Dec 2003	Succeeded by Nesrin Nas
