= Ahmet Kurtcebe Alptemoçin =

Turkish politician (born 1940)

Minister of Foreign Affairs
- In office 12 October 1990 – 23 June 1991
- President: Turgut Ozal
- Preceded by: Ali Bozer
- Succeeded by: Safa Giray

Turkey Minister of Finance and Customs
- In office 26 October 1984 – 30 March 1989
- President: Kenan Evren
- Preceded by: Vural Arıkan
- Succeeded by: Ekrem Pakdemirli

Personal details
- Born: January 27, 1940 (age 86) Istanbul, Turkey
- Education: Middle East Technical University

Ahmet Kurtcebe Alptemoçin (born 27 January 1940) is a Turkish mechanical engineer, industrialist and politician belonging to the Motherland Party. He served as minister of finance and customs between 1984 and 1985 and minister of foreign affairs between 1990 and 1991.

He graduated from the Middle East Technical University in Ankara with a B.S. degree in mechanical engineering. He was elected in the parliament as the Deputy of Bursa from the Motherland Party.

Political offices
Preceded by Vural Arıkan	Minister of Finance and Customs of Turkey; October 26, 1984 - March 30, 1989	Succeeded by Ekrem Pakdemirli
Preceded by Ali Bozer	Minister of Foreign Affairs of Turkey; October 10, 1990 - June 23, 1991	Succeeded by Safa Giray
