= 1997 Turkish military memorandum =

Turkish National Security Council memo which led to Prime Minister Erbakan's resignation

Tanks moving on the streets of Sincan

The 1997 military memorandum (Turkish: 28 Şubat, "28 February"; also called postmodern darbe, "post-modern coup") in Turkey was a memorandum, in which decisions issued by the Turkish military leadership on a National Security Council meeting on 28 February 1997 resulted in the resignation of Islamist prime minister Necmettin Erbakan of the Welfare Party, and the end of his coalition government.

As the government was forced out without dissolving the parliament or suspending the constitution, the event has been famously labelled a "postmodern coup" by the Turkish admiral Salim Dervişoğlu. The process after the coup is alleged to have been organised by the West Working Group, a purported clandestine group within the military.

== Preparations ==
The operation was planned by generals İsmail Hakkı Karadayı, Çevik Bir, Teoman Koman, Çetin Doğan, Necdet Timur, and Erol Özkasnak.

In 2012, Hasan Celal Güzel said that General Teoman Koman had approached him in September 1996 with a plan to install him or Mesut Yılmaz as prime minister after a planned coup. Güzel declined to get involved, and Yılmaz was appointed prime minister after the coup.

== Events ==
On 17 January 1997, during a visit to the Turkish General Staff, President Süleyman Demirel requested a briefing on common military problems. İsmail Hakkı Karadayı, Chief of the General Staff, enumerated 55 items. Demirel said half of them were based on hearsay and encouraged Karadayı to communicate with the government and to soften the memorandum's wording.

On 31 January 1997, protests were arranged by the Sincan municipality in Ankara, against Israeli human rights violations that took place in guise of an "Al-Quds night". The building in which the event took place was plastered with posters of Hamas and Hezbollah. As a reaction to the demonstration, tanks moved to the streets of Sincan on 4 February. This intervention was later described by Çevik Bir as "a balance adjustment to democracy".

At the National Security Council (MGK) meeting on 28 February 1997, the generals submitted their views on issues regarding secularism and political Islam on Turkey to the government. Admiral Güven Erkaya, commander of the Navy, criticized the government. After a 9-hour meeting, the MGK made several decisions, and Prime Minister Necmettin Erbakan from the Welfare Party was forced to sign the decisions, some of which were:

- Shutting down many religious schools opened during his term
- Abolition of tariqas (civilian religious groups)
- Mandatory 8-year education
- Punishment of crimes against Mustafa Kemal Atatürk's memory
- Enforcement of secular education laws
- Suppression of Iranian influence in Turkey that supports Islamist movements
- Stopping Islamist infiltration of the Turkish Armed Forces
- Enforcement of dress codes on government property

== Aftermath ==
Erbakan was forced to resign as a result of the military memorandum. Although DYP, RP, and BBP declared they should form the new government with the premiership of Tansu Çiller, Demirel appointed ANAP leader Mesut Yılmaz to form the new government. He formed a new coalition government with Bülent Ecevit (DSP leader) and Hüsamettin Cindoruk (the founder and the leader of DTP, a party founded after 28 February Process by former DYP members) on 30 June 1997. The Welfare Party was closed by the Constitutional Court of Turkey in 1998 for violating the constitution's separation of religion and state clause. Erbakan was banned from politics for five years, and former MP members and mayors of RP joined the successor Virtue Party. Istanbul mayor Recep Tayyip Erdoğan from the Virtue Party, was soon afterwards given a prison sentence after he read a nationalist and Islamist poem at a public function where he was present as mayor, and he was banned from politics for five years as well.

In the 1999 general elections, the Virtue Party won several seats in the parliament but it was not as successful as the Welfare Party in the 1995 general elections. One of the MP members of the party was Merve Kavakçı who wore an Islamic headscarf while coming to the parliament, which was against the dress code at the time and caused an incident. The Virtue Party was also closed by the Constitutional Court in 2001. Although Erdoğan was still banned from politics, he managed to form the Justice and Development Party (AKP), a reformist party that declared that it would not be a political party with an Islamist axis, as the Welfare Party and the Virtue Party of the ousted Erbakan had been before him. The traditional Islamists who did not favor this route formed the Felicity Party.

== Trial ==
Çevik Bir and 30 other officers from the Army were detained for their roles in this coup in April 2012. In 2018, a Turkish court awarded life sentence to 21 senior military officials for their role in sabotaging the democratic institutions. The court accused former military chief Ismail Hakki Karadayi and his deputy, Cevik Bir of "masterminding" the coup. Sixty-eight individuals were acquitted of involvement. Karadayi filed an appeal against the verdict, but died in 2020 while the process was ongoing. In 2024, Bir, Doğan and five other senior officers were pardoned by Recep Tayyip Erdoğan, by then the country's president, on account of ill health and old age.

== Opinions on the memorandum ==
While the move was ostensibly directed against Erbakan's Islamist party, some have speculated that the coup was actually directed against Erbakan's coalition partner, Tansu Çiller, who was implicated in the Susurluk scandal.

It is alleged that Bülent Orakoğlu of the police intelligence, under Hanefi Avcı, learned about the coup plans.

Çevik Bir, one of the generals who planned the process, said "In Turkey we have a marriage of Islam and democracy. (...) The child of this marriage is secularism. Now this child gets sick from time to time. The Turkish Armed Forces is the doctor which saves the child. Depending on how sick the kid is, we administer the necessary medicine to make sure the child recuperates".

Necmettin Erbakan claimed that the process was planned by "Zionists".

In October 2016, Tuncay Özkan claimed that the 28 February process was prepared and organized by the Gülen movement.

== See also ==
- 1960 Turkish coup d'état
- 1971 Turkish military memorandum
- 1980 Turkish coup d'état
