= Safa Giray =

Turkish politician (1931–2011)

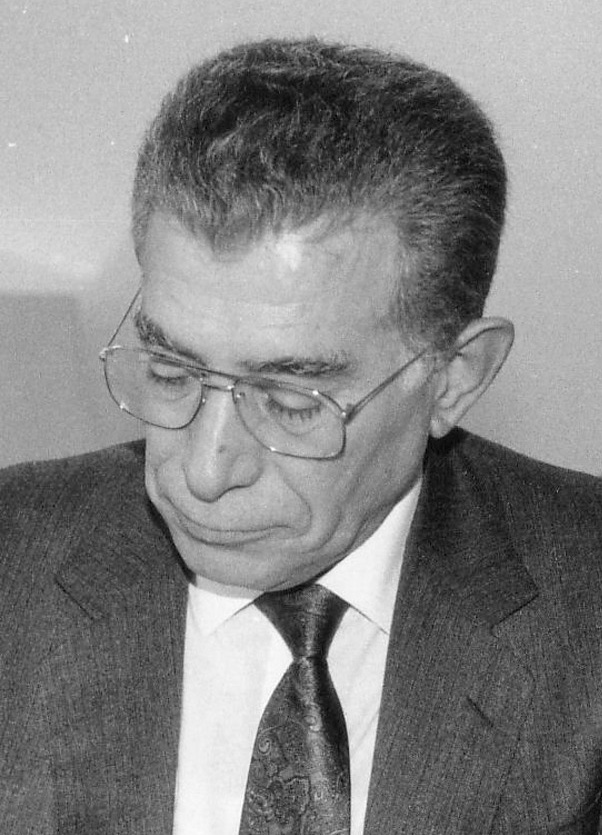

Minister of Foreign Affairs
- In office 23 June 1991 – 21 November 1991
- Prime Minister: Mesut Yılmaz
- Preceded by: Ahmet Kurtcebe Alptemoçin
- Succeeded by: Hikmet Çetin

Minister of National Defense
- In office 30 March 1989 – 19 October 1990
- Prime Minister: Turgut Özal, Yıldırım Akbulut
- Preceded by: Ercan Vuralhan
- Succeeded by: Güneş Taner

Minister of Public Works and Housing
- In office 13 December 1983 – 30 March 1989
- Prime Minister: Turgut Özal
- Preceded by: Ahmert Samsunlu
- Succeeded by: Cengiz Altınkaya

Personal details
- Born: 5 March 1931 İzmir, Turkey
- Died: 20 June 2011 (aged 80) Ankara, Turkey
- Party: Motherland Party (ANAP)
- Education: Istanbul Technical University
- Profession: Civil engineer; politician

İsmail Safa Giray (5 March 1931 – 20 June 2011) was a Turkish civil engineer and politician from the Motherland Party (Turkish: Anavatan Partisi, ANAP). He was a member of the Turkish parliament and served as Minister of Public Works and Housing, Minister of National Defense, and Minister of Foreign Affairs.

== Early life and education ==
Safa Giray was born in İzmir, Turkey in 1931. He graduated in 1954 with a degree from the Faculty of Civil Engineering at Istanbul Technical University.

== Career ==
Safa Giray entered politics in 1983 along with Turgut Özal from the beginnings of the Motherland Party and was elected into the parliament as an MP from Balıkesir Province. He held the office of Minister of Public Works and Settlement (13 December 1983 – 30 March 1989) in two Turgut Özal cabinets, Minister of National Defense (30 March 1989 – 19 October 1990) in the Yıldırım Akbulut cabinet. He resigned from the position because of inter-party and cabinet conflicts. Later, he was appointed Minister of Foreign Affairs (23 June 1991 – 21 November 1991) by Prime minister Mesut Yılmaz. He left politics in 1999 after 16 years.

In 1993, Safa Giray was accused of fraud and misuse of authority during his time of service as Minister of Public Works. He was tried before the Supreme Court in conjunction with the awarding of contracts for motorway construction. He was found not guilty and was acquitted on 12 April 1995.

Safa Giray died on 20 June 2011 in Ankara and was buried in Gölbaşı Cemetery following a state funeral in front of the Grand National Assembly of Turkey and a funeral service at the Kocatepe Mosque.

Political offices
Preceded by Ahmet Samsunlu	Minister of Public Works and Housing; 13 December 1983 – 30 March 1989	Succeeded by Cengiz Altınkaya
Preceded by Ercan Vuralhan	Minister of National Defence; 30 March 1989 – 19 October 1990	Succeeded by Güneş Taner
Preceded by Ahmet Kurtcebe Alptemoçin	Minister of Foreign Affairs; 23 June 1991 – 21 November 1991	Succeeded by Hikmet Çetin
