= Nationalist Democracy Party =

Former political party in Turkey

Nationalist Democracy Party (Turkish: Milliyetçi Demokrasi Partisi, MDP) was a political party in Turkey.

== Background ==
About one year after the coup of 1980, all political parties were closed by the military regime, or the so-called National Security Council or (Turkish: MGK) regardless of their political views, on 16 October 1981. For approximately one and half year, there were no legalised political parties. Finally, MGK decided to allow the formation of new parties with severe restrictions on their activities. National Democracy Party was the first party to be founded in 1983.

== History ==
The party was founded by 44 individuals on 16 May 1983. The president of the party was Turgut Sunalp (1917-1999), a retired general who had also been Turkish ambassador to Canada between 1976-1983. MGK permitted only three parties to participate in the elections held on 6 November 1983. Contrary to expectations National Democracy Party could receive only 23.3% and became the smallest party in the parliament. The support further dropped to 7.1% in the local elections held on 25 March 1984. The rapid loss of support resulted in disintegration of the party. In the congress held on 13 July 1985 Ülkü Söylemezoğlu replaced Turgut Sunalp. On 4 May 1986 the party dissolved itself. The members formed three groups. 18 MPs attended Motherland Party and 22 MPs attended True Path Party. The rest founded a short lived party named Free Democratic Party (Turkish: Hür Demokratik Parti).
