= Adnan Kahveci =

Turkish politician (1949–1993)

Turkish President of Finance and Customs
- In office 29 March 1990 – 20 November 1991
- Preceded by: Ekrem Pakdemirli
- Succeeded by: Sümer Oral

Personal details
- Born: 20 February 1949 Sürmene, Trabzon, Turkey
- Died: 5 February 1993 (aged 43) Gerede, Bolu, Turkey

Adnan Kahveci (20 February 1949 – 5 February 1993) was a noted Turkish politician who served as a key advisor to Prime Minister Turgut Özal throughout the 1980s. He was one of the founders in 1983 of the Motherland Party (ANAP) led by Turgut Özal, and later a minister in Özal's government. He died in a car accident in 1993. Prior to his political career in Turkey, Kahveci had led a successful career as an electrical engineer and academic in the United States, having done his studies in Purdue University and having risen to become a professor at the University of Missouri.

== Background ==
He was born in Sürmene, Trabzon Province in 1949. Adnan Kahveci was recognized very early as a child prodigy, having come first in a nationwide exam organized by the newspaper Milliyet among primary school students in 1961, in the entry exams for the select Kabataş High School in 1966, in another nationwide exam organized this time by the newspaper Hürriyet and among high school students, in the nationwide university entry exams in 1966 and in Istanbul University scholarship exams. He pursued his studies in electrical engineering in Purdue University in the United States and obtained his doctorate from University of Missouri where he went on to become a professor.

After his return to Turkey, he was, for a time in the academic staff of Boğaziçi University.

== Political career ==
In the early 1980s Kahveci was "chef de cabinet" (chief of staff) to Prime Minister Turgut Özal, becoming, in the words of The Independent, "the main link between Ozal and the outside world, including local politicians and civil servants, the military, as well as Western journalists and foreign investors." When Özal broke with the military in 1982, Kahveci supported his creation of the ANAP (Motherland Party), and would have stood in the 1983 elections if he had not been banned by the military. He became Özal's chief advisor, and entered Parliament in the 1987 elections.

He then served for three terms, and was Minister of State responsible, notably, for the Turkish Radio and Television Corporation (TRT) as well as Minister of Finance (1990 - 1991). Under his tenure, TRT slowly and through equivocal means ceased to be the single TV network in Turkey's media, as private networks were increasingly tolerated and then legalised. As minister and previously advisor to Özal, Kahveci played a catalytic role in many of the key steps taken by ANAP in the eighties, including shaping Turkey's first privatisations. He also followed up allegations of corruption, arranging for a minister who had accepted a pay-off for contracting a shipment of oil to be taped during the conversation on the transaction, and bringing the recording to Özal. Both in office and during the short subsequent period he spent as a member of the opposition after the 1991 elections, he was widely recognized as a maverick deputy, who spoke his mind irrespective of the party line.

Prior to his death, Kahveci was working with Özal on the Kurdish question, and wrote a report urging a peaceful solution, including recognition of the Kurdish language. According to the autobiography of Sakıp Sabancı, Özal had also entrusted Kahveci with the issue of potentially reserving seats in Parliament for minorities (an idea Sabancı had urged Özal to take up).

== Death ==
Kahveci died in a car accident in Gerede on 5 February 1993, together with his wife and daughter.

== Books ==
- Adnan Kahveci (1976). Automated Visual Industrial Quality Control Systems (Thesis Ph.D.). University of Missouri.

== Sources ==
- Gülistan Gürbey (2005). Aussenpolitik in defekten Demokratien (in German). Campus. ISBN 3-593-37472-2.
- Andrew Mango (2004). The Turks today. New York City: The Overlook Press. ISBN 1-58567-756-6.

Political offices
Preceded by Ekrem Pakdemirli	Minister of Finance of Turkey; March 29, 1990–November 20, 1991	Succeeded by Sümer Oral
