= Democrat Turkey Party =

Democrat Turkey Party Demokrat Türkiye Partisi
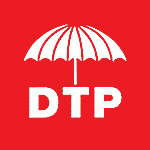
- Founded: January 7, 1997
- Dissolved: May 15, 2005
- Split from: True Path Party
- Succeeded by: People's Ascent Party
- Headquarters: Ankara, Turkey
- Ideology: Liberal conservatism
- Political position: Centre-right

Democrat Turkey Party (Turkish: Demokrat Türkiye Partisi, DTP) is a former political party in Turkey

The party was founded by a group of MPs issued from the True Path Party on 7 January 1997. The chairman of the party was Hüsamettin Cindoruk, who was a former chairman of the True Path Party. The party participated in the coalition government of Mesut Yılmaz (30 June 1997 – 11 January 1999). In the 1999 elections they received less than 1% of the vote. Hüsamettin Cindoruk resigned. The DTP's name was changed to the Freedom and Change Party at its third ordinary congress held on May 15, 2005. The Freedom and Change Party decided to merge with the People's Ascent Party in 2008.
