= Kaya Erdem =

16th Speaker of the Parliament of the Republic of Turkey from 1989 to 1991

Minister of Finance
- In office 20 September 1980 – 14 July 1982
- Prime Minister: Bülend Ulusu
- Preceded by: İsmet Sezgin
- Succeeded by: Adnan Başer Kafaoğlu

16th Speaker of the Grand National Assembly
- In office 21 November 1989 – 20 October 1991
- President: Turgut Özal
- Preceded by: Yıldırım Akbulut
- Succeeded by: Hüsamettin Cindoruk

Personal details
- Born: 10 September 1928 (age 97) Karabük, Turkey
- Party: ANAP

İsmet Kaya Erdem (born 10 September 1928 in Karabük) is a Turkish politician who served as the Minister of Finance and the Speaker of the Grand National Assembly.

Political offices
Preceded by İsmet Sezgin	Minister of Finance; 20 September 1980 – 14 July 1982	Succeeded by Adnan Başer Kafaoğlu
Preceded by Yıldırım Akbulut	Speaker of the Parliament of Turkey; 21 November 1989 – 20 October 1991	Succeeded by Hüsamettin Cindoruk
