= 1983 Turkish general election =

← 1977	6 November 1983	1987 →

All 400 seats in the Grand National Assembly 201 seats needed for a majority
- Turnout: 92.27% (▲19.85pp)
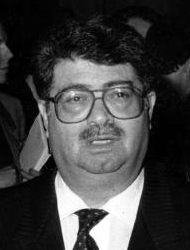

	First party	Second party	Third party
Leader	Turgut Özal	Necdet Calp	Turgut Sunalp
Party	ANAP	HP	MDP
Seats won	211	117	71
Popular vote	7,833,148	5,285,804	4,036,970
Percentage	45.14%	30.46%	23.27%
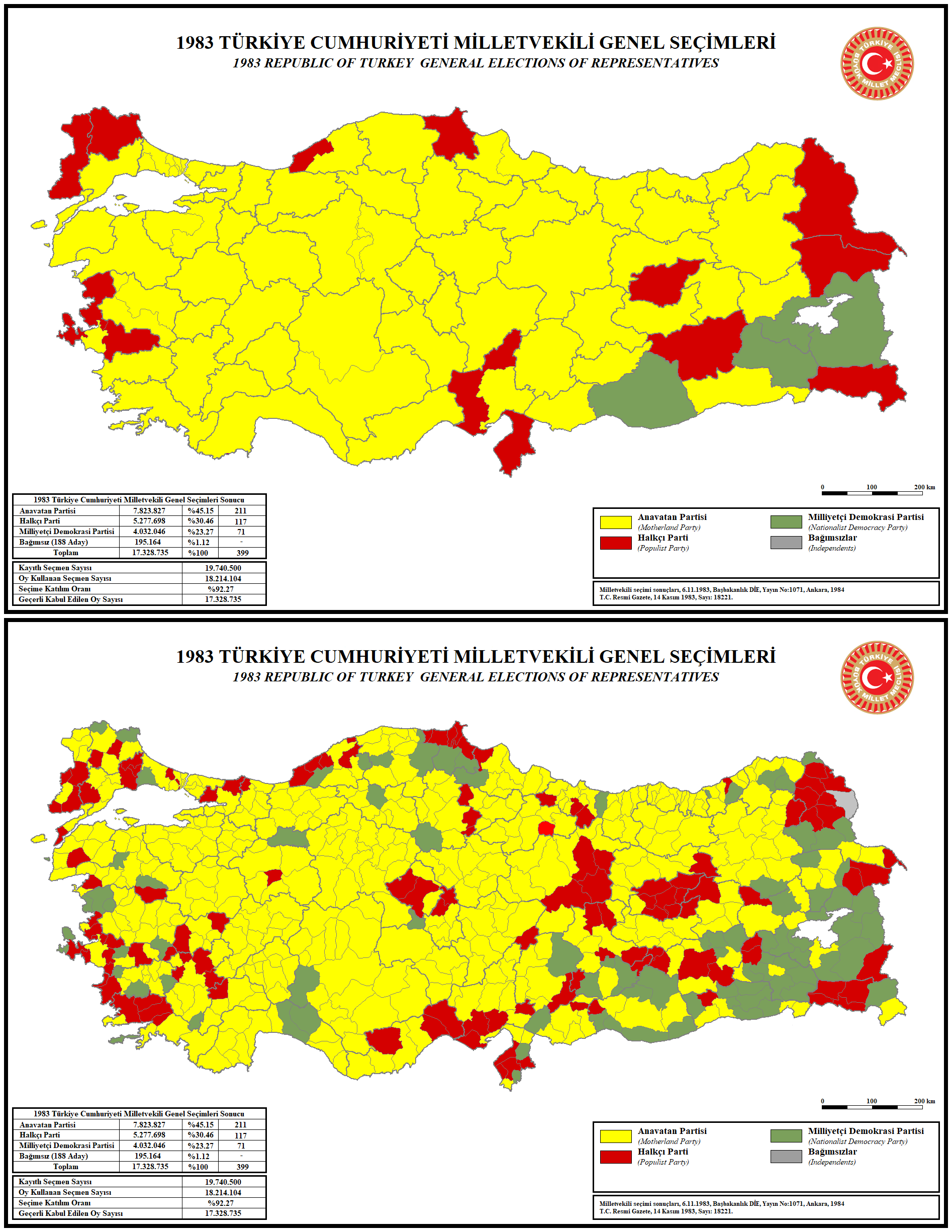
- Winning parties by city, electoral district and district
Prime Minister before election
Bülent Ulusu
Military
Elected Prime Minister
Turgut Özal
ANAP

General elections were held in Turkey on 6 November 1983, the first since 1977 after democratic rights were abandoned after the military coup of 1980. The National Security Council banned the previous political parties from participating, leading to the establishment of new parties. Turgut Özal's Motherland Party (ANAP) won a significant victory in this elections by gaining 45.14% of the votes. This victory was the starting point of a rapid change in the structure of the state and society in Turkey. Voter turnout was 92.3%.

The Populist Party (HP) was the continuation of the former CHP and was the only left-wing participant in the election. The Nationalist Democracy Party was founded by the military junta of the time, whilst the Motherland Party was seen as the successor of the Justice Party (AP) by some circles but Süleyman Demirel, the leader of AP, who would later form the DYP to challenge the power of Turgut Özal's Motherland Party. With a first-ever televised debate on TRT, the elections brought a new factor into the political campaign. Necdet Calp was a long serving politician, Sunalp a high-ranking officer, and both had little to offer to confront Turgut Özal's rhetorical skills.

== Results ==
Owing to a registration error in the town of Bingöl, ANAP were unable to take one of the seats they had won there, lowering the total number of MPs in the chamber to 399.

Party	Votes	%	Seats	+/–
Motherland Party	7,833,148	45.14	211	New
Populist Party	5,285,804	30.46	117	New
Nationalist Democracy Party	4,036,970	23.27	71	New
Independents	195,588	1.13	0	0
Total	17,351,510	100.00	399	–51
Valid votes	17,351,510	95.14		
Invalid/blank votes	886,852	4.86		
Total votes	18,238,362	100.00		
Registered voters/turnout	19,767,366	92.27		
Source: Nohlen et al.
