= Yıldırım Akbulut =

Prime Minister of Turkey from 1989 to 1991

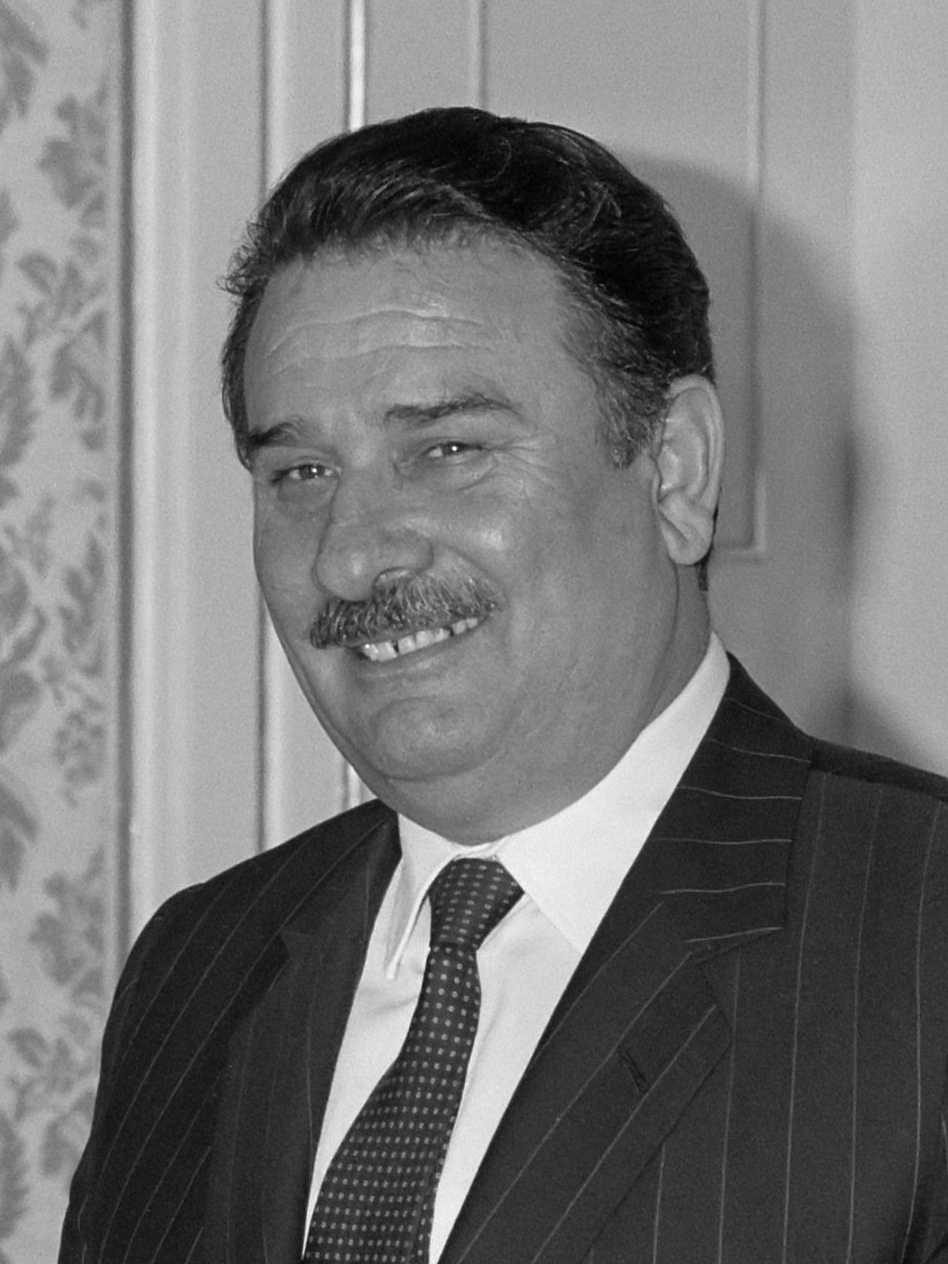
- Akbulut in 1988

20th Prime Minister of Turkey
- In office 9 November 1989 – 23 June 1991
- President: Turgut Özal
- Deputy: Ali Bozer (1989-90)
- Preceded by: Ali Bozer (acting)
- Succeeded by: Mesut Yılmaz

15th Speaker of the Grand National Assembly
- In office 20 May 1999 – 30 September 2000
- President: Süleyman Demirel; Ahmet Necdet Sezer
- Preceded by: Hikmet Çetin
- Succeeded by: Ömer İzgi
- In office 24 December 1987 – 9 November 1989
- President: Kenan Evren
- Preceded by: Necmettin Karaduman
- Succeeded by: İsmet Kaya Erdem

Leader of the Motherland Party
- In office 16 November 1989 – 15 June 1991
- Preceded by: Turgut Özal
- Succeeded by: Mesut Yılmaz

Interior Minister of Turkey
- In office 26 October 1984 – 26 September 1987
- Prime Minister: Turgut Özal
- Preceded by: Ali Tanrıyar
- Succeeded by: Ahmet Selçuk

Member of the Grand National Assembly
- In office 2 May 1999 – 3 November 2002
- Constituency: Ankara (1999)
- In office 24 November 1983 – 4 December 1995
- Constituency: Erzincan (1983, 1987, 1991)

Personal details
- Born: 2 September 1935 Erzincan, Turkey
- Died: 14 April 2021 (aged 85) Ankara, Turkey
- Resting place: State Cemetery
- Party: ANAP
- Spouse: Saime Akbulut
- Education: Law
- Alma mater: Istanbul University
- Profession: Politician

Yıldırım Akbulut (Turkish pronunciation: [jɯɫdɯˈɾɯm akbuˈɫut]; 2 September 1935 – 14 April 2021) was a Turkish politician, who was a leader of the Motherland Party (ANAP), the Prime Minister of Turkey, and twice the Speaker of the Grand National Assembly of Turkey.

A lawyer by profession, Akbulut was one of the founding members of the Motherland Party in 1983. Entering Parliament in the 1983 general election, he became the Minister of the Interior under Prime Minister and ANAP leader Turgut Özal in 1984. Serving until 1987, Akbulut was then fielded as his party's candidate for Parliamentary speaker, which he won and subsequently served until 1989.

In 1989, Özal contested the presidential election and was elected the 8th President of Turkey. Özal chose Akbulut as his successor as prime minister, leading him to be elected ANAP leader and taking office as the 20th prime minister of Turkey. He was widely regarded as a 'puppet' of President Özal, who was accused despite his ceremonial and impartial position of calling the shots for the government. He was defeated in the 1991 ANAP leadership primaries by Mesut Yılmaz and subsequently left office. In 1999, he was elected for a second time as Speaker of Parliament.

To this date in Turkish politics, 'Yıldırım Akbulut' has become synonymous with 'political puppet', denoting a politician stationed in high office but actually only serving on behalf of another, more powerful superior. When serving prime minister Recep Tayyip Erdoğan was elected president in 2014, the media ran speculation about who would be Erdoğan's 'Yıldırım Akbulut' (replacement prime minister on Erdoğan's behalf).

== Biography ==
Akbulut was born in Erzincan, Turkey, as the son of a postman. After finishing high school, he was educated in law at Istanbul University. Following his graduation, he worked as a freelance lawyer.

Upon entering the political arena, Akbulut was elected to the parliament from the Erzincan province. He served as Minister of Interior in the cabinet of Turgut Özal. He was then elected Speaker of the Parliament serving between December 24, 1987 and November 9, 1989.

After the election of Turgut Özal as the president of Turkey, Akbulut became prime minister from November 9, 1989 forming the 47th government of Turkey. On June 15, 1991, he lost Anavatan Party primaries to Mesut Yilmaz, ending his tenure in office. In 1992, with the order of Ozal, Akbulut resigned from the party; however, he returned shortly afterwards.

On May 20, 1999, Yıldırım Akbulut was elected for the second time Speaker of the Grand National Assembly that lasted until September 30, 2000.

He was married and had three children. Akbulut died at the age of 85 in Ankara on 14 April 2021 from COVID-19. He was interred at the Turkish State Cemetery.

Political offices
Preceded by Ali Tanrıyar	Interior Minister of Turkey; Oct 26, 1984–Sep 16, 1987	Succeeded by Ahmet Selçuk
Preceded by Necmettin Karaduman	Speaker of the Parliament of Turkey; Dec 24, 1987–Nov 9, 1989	Succeeded by İsmet Kaya Erdem
Preceded by Turgut Özal	Prime Minister of Turkey; Nov 9, 1989–Jun 23, 1991	Succeeded by Mesut Yılmaz
Preceded by Hikmet Çetin	Speaker of the Parliament of Turkey; May 20, 1999–Sep 30, 2000	Succeeded by Ömer İzgi
Party political offices
Preceded by Turgut Özal	Leader of the Motherland Party; Nov 16, 1989–Jun 15, 1991	Succeeded by Mesut Yılmaz
