= Mesut Yılmaz =

Prime Minister of Turkey (1991; 1996; 1997–1999)

Ahmet Mesut Yılmaz
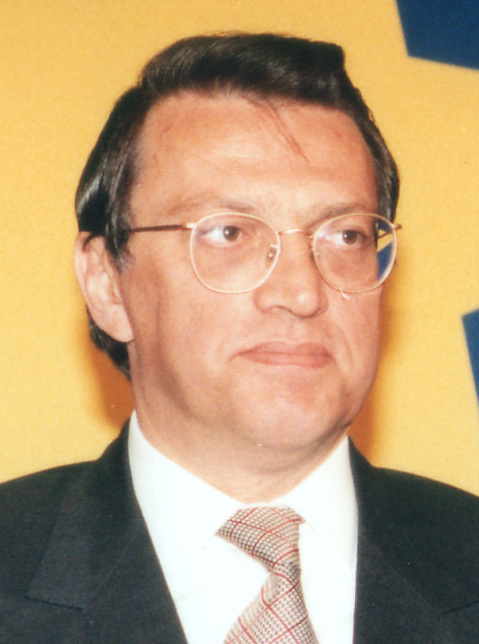
- Yılmaz in 1996

21st Prime Minister of Turkey
- In office 30 June 1997 – 11 January 1999
- President: Süleyman Demirel
- Preceded by: Necmettin Erbakan
- Succeeded by: Bülent Ecevit
- In office 6 March 1996 – 28 June 1996
- President: Süleyman Demirel
- Preceded by: Tansu Çiller
- Succeeded by: Necmettin Erbakan
- In office 23 June 1991 – 20 November 1991
- President: Turgut Özal
- Preceded by: Yıldırım Akbulut
- Succeeded by: Süleyman Demirel

Deputy Prime Minister of Turkey
- In office 13 July 2000 – 18 November 2002
- Prime Minister: Bülent Ecevit
- Served with: Devlet Bahçeli; Hüsamettin Özkan; Şükrü Sina Gürel
- Preceded by: Cumhur Ersümer
- Succeeded by: Mehmet Ali Şahin

Leader of the Motherland Party
- In office 15 June 1991 – 4 November 2002
- Preceded by: Yıldırım Akbulut
- Succeeded by: Ali Talip Özdemir

Minister of Foreign Affairs
- In office 22 December 1987 – 20 February 1990
- Prime Minister: Turgut Özal; Yıldırım Akbulut
- Preceded by: Vahit Melih Halefoğlu
- Succeeded by: Ali Bozer

Minister of Culture and Tourism
- In office 17 October 1986 – 21 December 1987
- Prime Minister: Turgut Özal
- Preceded by: Mükerrem Taşçıoğlu
- Succeeded by: Tınaz Titiz

Minister of State
- In office 28 May 1999 – 18 November 2002
- Prime Minister: Bülent Ecevit
- In office 13 December 1983 – 17 October 1986
- Prime Minister: Turgut Özal
- Succeeded by: Hasan Celal Güzel

Member of the Grand National Assembly
- In office 22 July 2007 – 12 June 2011
- Constituency: Rize (2007)
- In office 24 November 1983 – 3 November 2002
- Constituency: Rize (1983, 1987, 1991, 1995, 1999)

Personal details
- Born: Ahmet Mesut Yılmaz; 6 November 1947 Istanbul, Turkey
- Died: 30 October 2020 (aged 72) Istanbul, Turkey
- Resting place: Kanlıca Cemetery
- Party: Motherland Party
- Spouse: Berna Yılmaz
- Children: 2
- Education: St. Georgs-Kolleg; Istanbul Erkek Lisesi
- Alma mater: Ankara University; University of Cologne

Ahmet Mesut Yılmaz (Turkish pronunciation: [meˈsut jɯɫˈmaz]) (6 November 1947 – 30 October 2020) was a Turkish politician. He was the leader of the Motherland Party (Turkish: Anavatan Partisi, ANAP) from 1991 to 2002, and served three times as Prime Minister of Turkey. His first two prime-ministerial terms lasted just months (in 1991 and 1996), while the third ran from June 1997 to January 1999. The first was brought to an end by defeat in the 1991 elections, the latter two by the breakdown of Yılmaz' coalition governments.

== Career ==
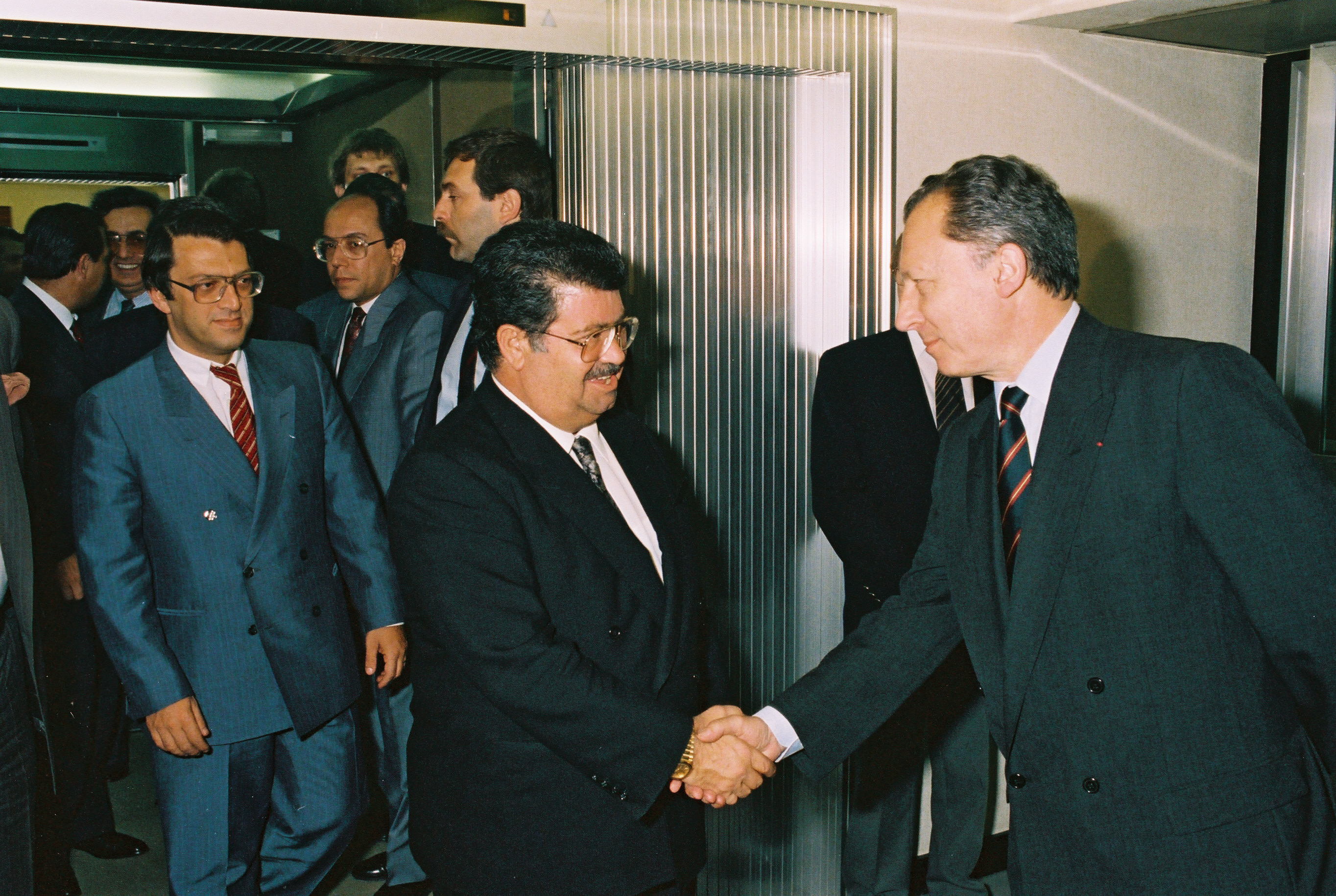
Foreign Minister Mesut Yılmaz behind Prime Minister Turgut Özal and President of the European Commission Jacques Delors

Of Hamsheni origin, Mesut Yılmaz was a rising star in the Motherland Party of Turgut Özal, representing the Black Sea province of Rize in the parliament and serving in Özal's cabinet. He was State Minister for Information (December 1983), then Minister of Culture and Tourism (1986), and Minister of Foreign Affairs (December 1987 to February 1990). Upon Özal's election to the presidency in 1989, Yılmaz became the leader of an intraparty opposition to the new prime minister, Yıldırım Akbulut.

== Prime minister ==
In June 1991, Yılmaz managed to discharge Yıldırım Akbulut from the party leadership and from all executive functions during the biennial party congress. Because ANAP had the majority in the parliament he subsequently became Prime Minister of Turkey in the 48th government of Turkey. However, in October ANAP came in second in the 1991 general election to Süleyman Demirel's True Path Party (DYP), and the DYP formed a coalition with the Social Democratic Populist Party (49th government of Turkey).

The following years saw a decline in the popularity of the Motherland Party and an acrimonious relationship with Tansu Çiller, leader of the center-right True Path Party (DYP). Yılmaz also made the Motherland Party more business-friendly and Europe-oriented, causing the more conservative, religious wing to switch to the Welfare Party (RP) of Necmettin Erbakan. In the December 1995 general election ANAP again came second, this time to the Welfare Party. After lengthy coalition negotiations Yılmaz formed a coalition with the DYP in March 1996 (53rd government of Turkey), but this lasted less than four months, falling to a censure motion led by the Welfare Party. President Demirel invited Erbakan to form a government, which he did, in coalition with the DYP.

Erbakan's term was marked by the Susurluk scandal, during the investigation of which Yılmaz admitted the existence of the JİTEM counter-terrorist Gendarmerie unit. The scandal led to the resignation of Erbakan's Interior Minister, Mehmet Ağar (a leader of the True Path Party, DYP), following revelations that Abdullah Çatlı, leader of the far-right Grey Wolves organisation, worked for the state. Yılmaz' concerns over his own safety, owing to his support of the Susurluk investigation, led to him briefly carrying a gun in self-defense.

Yılmaz formed a government for the third time in June 1997, after the Welfare Party had resigned from government following the February 1997 military memorandum. DYP and others expected to form a government under Tansu Çiller, but President Süleyman Demirel asked Yılmaz to form the new government. Yılmaz created an ANAP-Democratic Left Party-Democrat Turkey Party coalition which lasted until January 1999. Yılmaz' final term was marked by fallout from the investigations into the Susurluk scandal, and further revelations of connections between politicians, police and mafia. When the attempt to privatize the Türk Ticaret Bankası to Korkmaz Yiğit blew up in October 1998 over allegations of the involvement of mafia boss Alaattin Çakıcı, Yılmaz' coalition did not last much longer.

In October 1998, Yılmaz set off a furor in the Arab world by threatening to "poke out the eyes" of Syria over Hafez al-Assad's alleged support of the separatist Kurdistan Workers' Party.

== Later career ==
Yılmaz continued as a politician, however, serving as a deputy prime minister in a coalition led by Bülent Ecevit from 1999 to 2002. After his failure to win entry into the Grand National Assembly in 2002 elections, Yılmaz retired from politics to pursue a teaching career. A few days before the match between Fenerbahçe and Malatyaspor, the then-Prime Minister, Yılmaz, was a guest on a TV channel with Can Ataklı. During their conversation, Yılmaz made a statement: "By Allah's permission, we will make Galatasaray the champion this year too." Prior to the Malatyaspor match at Fenerbahçe's closed stands, a huge banner was unfurled, reading "We'll see you at the ballot box, Mesut Bey."

He was charged by the state public prosecutor with corruption during his tenure as prime minister relating to the privatization of Turkish Trade Bank. In 2006, the Supreme Court suspended the case for five years, so that the charges would be dropped if no similar charges arose in that period. Yılmaz announced that he would return to politics.

In the 2007 general election, he was elected as independent member of parliament from Rize. He died from complications of lung cancer in 30 October 2020 and was buried at Kanlıca Cemetery two days later.

== Personal life ==
He was married to Berna Yılmaz. The couple became parents to two sons, Hasan Yılmaz and Yavuz Yılmaz, the latter of which was found shot dead in his apartment in Beykoz, Istanbul in December 2017. His son's death was reported as a probable suicide by Turkish police. Mesut Yılmaz's own licensed Smith & Wesson gun was found beside his son's body.

Political offices
Preceded by Vahit Melih Halefoğlu	Minister of Foreign Affairs of Turkey; 22 December 1987–20 February 1990	Succeeded by Ali Bozer
Preceded by Yıldırım Akbulut	Prime Minister of Turkey; 23 June 1991–20 November 1991	Succeeded by Süleyman Demirel
Preceded by Tansu Çiller	Prime Minister of Turkey; 6 March 1996–28 June 1996	Succeeded by Necmettin Erbakan
Preceded by Necmettin Erbakan	Prime Minister of Turkey; 30 June 1997–11 January 1999	Succeeded by Bülent Ecevit
Preceded by Hüsamettin Özkan; Hikmet Uluğbay	Deputy Prime Minister of Turkey; 13 July 2000–19 November 2002	Succeeded by Mehmet Ali Şahin; Ertuğrul Yalçınbayır; Abdüllatif Şener
Party political offices
Preceded by Yıldırım Akbulut	Leader of the Motherland Party (ANAP); 15 June 1991–4 November 2002	Succeeded by Ali Talip Özdemir
