= 1987 Turkish general election =

← 1983	29 November 1987	1991 →

All 450 seats in the Grand National Assembly 226 seats needed for a majority
- Turnout: 93.28% (▲1.01pp)
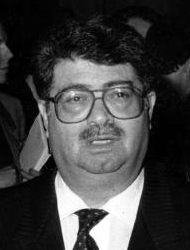

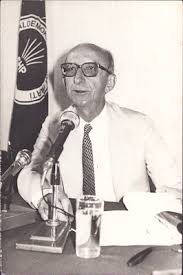

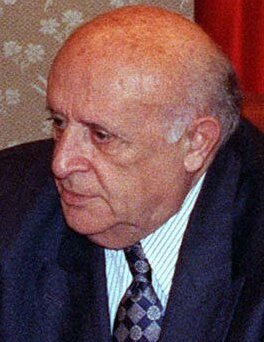
	First party	Second party	Third party
Leader	Turgut Özal	Erdal İnönü	Süleyman Demirel
Party	ANAP	SHP	DYP
Last election	45.14%, 211 seats	30.46%, 117 seats	–
Seats won	292	99	59
Seat change	▲81	▼18	New
Popular vote	8,704,335	5,931,000	4,587,062
Percentage	36.31%	24.74%	19.14%
Swing	▼8.83pp	▼5.72pp	New
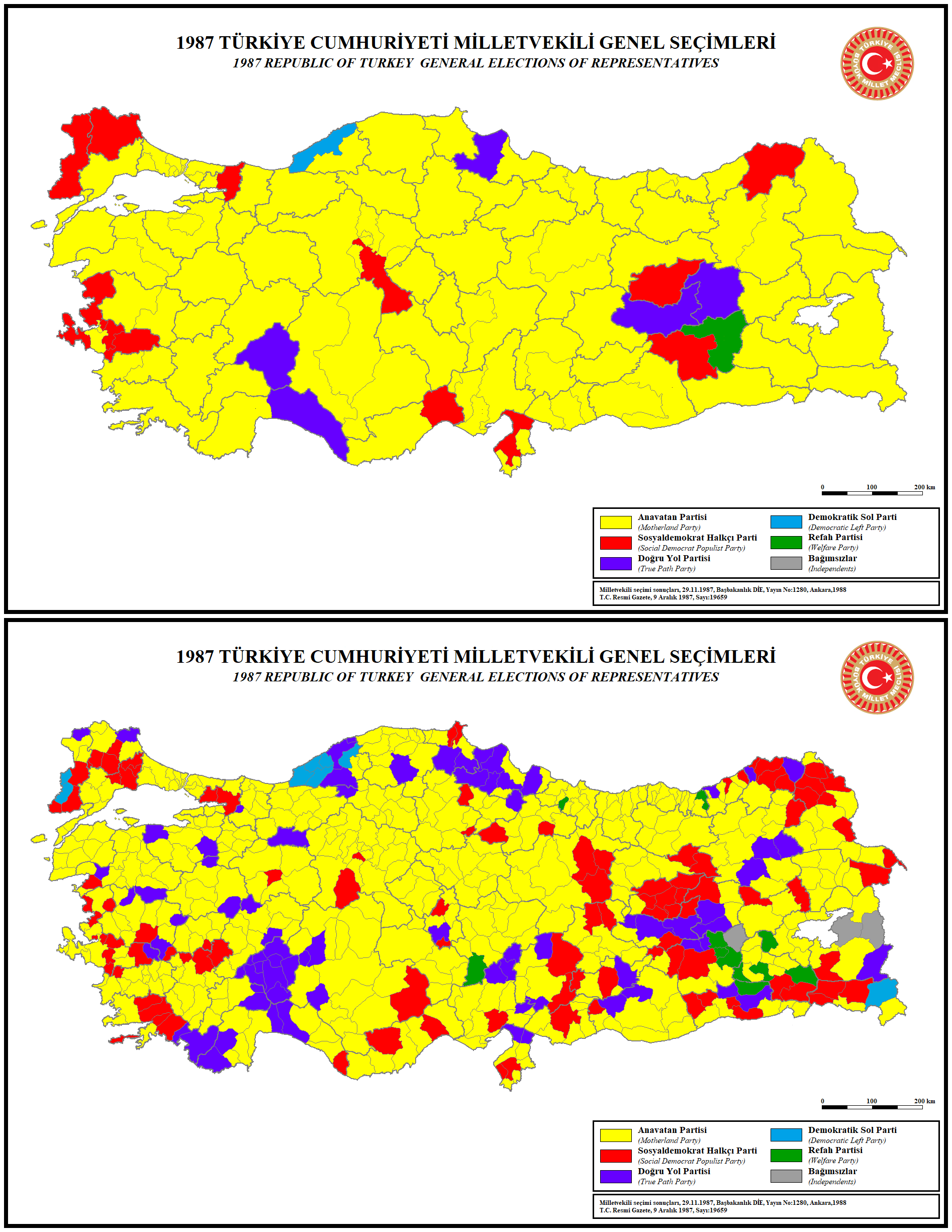
Prime Minister before election
Turgut Özal
ANAP
Elected Prime Minister
Turgut Özal
ANAP

General elections were held in Turkey on 29 November 1987. Prior to the elections, the military junta's restrictions on former politicians were lifted, allowing them to re-enter politics. However, only three political parties were approved by the junta to participate in the election. Despite a reduction in its share of the vote, the Motherland Party retained its majority in parliament, gaining 81 seats. Voter turnout was 93.3%.

The elections saw the return of the religious oriented base of Necmettin Erbakan and the symbol names of the politics in the 1970s, Bülent Ecevit and Süleyman Demirel. Bülent Ecevit led the Democratic Left Party as the Republican People's Party was closed down after the coup of 1980. Süleyman Demirel founded the True Path Party to challenge the power of Turgut Özal on conservative liberal votes. The elections were marked by harsh restrictions on televised publicity for the opposition parties. Unlike the 1983 elections, there was no televised debate between the presidential candidates. Only one week before the elections, political infomercials from the different parties were aired. The Social Democratic Populist Party gained the most benefit of the infomercials, as the SHP polled about 30% compared to the 18% before screening the infomercial.

== Background ==
On 26 September 1985 a merger protocol was signed between the Populist Party (HP) and the Social Democracy Party (SODEP). As a result, both parties held extraordinary congresses and HP was renamed the Social Democratic Populist Party (SHP), while SODEP was dissolved and merged into the SHP. This united the left in a single party.

== Results ==
Party	Votes	%	Seats	+/–
Motherland Party	8,704,335	36.31	292	+81
Social Democratic Populist Party	5,931,000	24.74	99	New
True Path Party	4,587,062	19.14	59	New
Democratic Left Party	2,044,576	8.53	0	New
Welfare Party	1,717,425	7.16	0	New
Nationalist Task Party	701,538	2.93	0	New
Reformist Democracy Party	196,272	0.82	0	New
Independents	89,421	0.37	0	0
Total	23,971,629	100.00	450	+51
Valid votes	23,971,629	97.43		
Invalid/blank votes	631,912	2.57		
Total votes	24,603,541	100.00		
Registered voters/turnout	26,376,926	93.28		
Source: Nohlen et al.
