= Motherland Party (Turkey) =

Political party in Turkey

Motherland Party Anavatan Partisi
- Abbreviation: ANAP
- Chairperson: Turgut Özal (first); Salih Uzun (last)
- Founder: Turgut Özal
- Founded: 20 May 1983; 43 years ago
- Dissolved: 31 October 2009; 16 years ago
- Merged into: Democrat Party
- Succeeded by: Motherland Party (unofficial)
- Headquarters: Ankara, Turkey
- Ideology: Özalism; Neoliberalism; New Right; Economic liberalism; Liberal conservatism; Decentralisation; Civic nationalism; Pro-Europeanism
- Political position: centre-right to right-wing
- Colors: Gold

The Motherland Party (Turkish: Anavatan Partisi, ANAP) was a political party in Turkey. It was founded in 1983 by Turgut Özal. It merged with the Democrat Party in October 2009.

The ANAP was considered a centre to centre-right neoliberal and liberal conservative party that supported restrictions on the role that government can play in the economy and also supported private capital and enterprise and some public expressions of religion. In social policy, it emphasised Islamic values, but represented a different, modern understanding of Islam compared to the Islamist parties; in economic policy it advocated liberalisation and a free market economy. It emphasised the liberalisation of society. Especially since 1991, when Turgut Özal was succeeded by Mesut Yılmaz, many liberal reforms were carried out. The 1983 Turkish general election was won by the new Motherland Party, led by Özal. Although the party was composed of a potentially disruptive mixture of Islamic revivalist and secular liberals, he was able to form a majority government, and briefly, democracy was restored.

== History ==
=== Foundation ===
The ANAP was founded on 20 May 1983. The party's founders were Turgut Özal, Cavit Şadi Pehlivanoğlu, Mehmet Keçeciler, Mesut Yılmaz, Cavit Kavak, Adnan Kahveci, Cemil Çiçek, Ali Ayağ, Mustafa Taşar, Kaya Erdem, Güneş Taner, Abdullah Tenekeci, Kazım Oksay, Recep Ercüment Konukman, Veysel Atasoy, Halil Şıvgın, Vehbi Dinçerler, Sudi Türel, Necat Eldem, Ali Tanrıyar, Bedrettin Doğancan Akyürek, İbrahim Özdemir, Abdulhalim Aras, Hüsnü Doğan, Leyla Yeniay Köseoğlu, Vural Arıkan, Bedrettin Dalan, Abdülhalim Aras, Nail Kul, Mehmet Altınsoy and Alpaslan Pehlivanlı.

=== 1983 general elections ===
In the general elections on 6 November 1983, the Motherland Party, the Populist Party (HP), and the Nationalist Democracy Party (MDP) were allowed to run for office. The ANAP won 212 of the 400 available seats and Turgut Özal, the leader of the party, became the Prime Minister. The ANAP maintained a majority in the government of Turkey from 1983 until 1991. Turgut Özal held the position of Prime Minister from 1983 to 1989, then President from 1989 to 1993. Özal died in office, and was succeeded by the True Path Party leader, Süleyman Demirel.

=== 1987 referendum and general elections ===
With the 1987 Turkish constitutional referendum, despite the ANAP campaigning against it, a 10-year ban on over 200 leaders of the Republican People's Party and the Justice Party were lifted, allowing them to run for office and participate in political affairs. In 1987 Turkish general election the ANAP won 292 of the 450 seats.

During this time, the ANAP leaders transformed the Turkish economy by beginning free-market reforms, particularly cutting down the public area and moving towards privately owned business. In 1987, the ANAP-led government filed for admission into the European Economic Community, the forerunner of the European Union. However, this attempt to enter the EEC was ended when the ANAP criticised the customs union of the EEC and decided the admission terms prescribed by the EEC to be not in the best interest of Turkey or its people.

=== 1991 general elections ===
In the 1991 Turkish general election, the ANAP lost the majority to a coalition of the True Path Party and the Social Democratic Populist Party.

=== 1995 general elections ===
After its longest run, the ANAP has had few opportunities to return to leadership. After the 1995 Turkish general election, the ANAP formed a brief coalition with the True Path Party (DYP), another centre-right oriented party, that allowed their influence to return for a short period of time. Then, from July 1997 to November 1998, the ANAP was returned to the head of government with the leader Mesut Yılmaz during Turkey's first televised elections.

=== 1999 general elections ===
However, the ANAP suffered one of the largest defeats during the April 1999 elections and became the fourth largest political party in Turkey with only 14% of the votes. Following these elections, the ANAP received only 86 of 365 seats in the Parliament. They were part of the coalition government with DSP and MHP until 2002.

=== 2002 general elections ===
During the 2002 elections, they got only 5.12% of the votes and no seats in Parliament.

On 5 May 2007, it was announced that the ANAP and the DYP would merge to the Democrat Party (DP). However, this failed and the ANAP announced that it would not run for the upcoming elections.

From 2008 to 2009, its president was Salih Uzun. On 31 October 2009, it was merged to the Democrat Party.

== Leaders ==
The chief executive member of the party was called the Genel Başkan. He/She was elected by party delegates in biennial party congresses. The party had seven leaders since its foundation in 1983 until 2009:

1. Turgut Özal (May 20, 1983 – October 31, 1989)
2. Yıldırım Akbulut (November 16, 1989 – June 15, 1991)
3. Mesut Yılmaz (June 15, 1991 – November 4, 2002)
4. Ali Talip Özdemir (November 18, 2002 – October 3, 2003)
5. Nesrin Nas (October 15, 2003 – March 21, 2005)
6. Erkan Mumcu (April 2, 2005 – October 26, 2008)
7. Salih Uzun (October 26, 2008 – October 31, 2009)

(During periods between the resignation or incapacitation of a leader and the election of a new one, the central committee of the party collectively acted as leader.)

== Election results ==
=== General elections ===
Grand National Assembly of Turkey
Election date	Party leader	Number of votes	% of votes	Seats won	Government
1983	Turgut Özal	7,833,148	45.14%	211 / 400	ANAP
1987	Turgut Özal	8,704,335	36.31%	292 / 450	ANAP
1991	Mesut Yılmaz	5,862,623	24.01%	115 / 450	DYP-SHP
1991	Mesut Yılmaz	5,862,623	24.01%	115 / 450	DYP minority
1995	Mesut Yılmaz	5,527,288	19.65%	132 / 550	DYP-CHP
1995	Mesut Yılmaz	5,527,288	19.65%	132 / 550	DYP-ANAP
1995	Mesut Yılmaz	5,527,288	19.65%	132 / 550	RP-DYP
1995	Mesut Yılmaz	5,527,288	19.65%	132 / 550	ANAP-DSP-DTP
1995	Mesut Yılmaz	5,527,288	19.65%	132 / 550	DSP minority
1999	Mesut Yılmaz	4,122,929	13.22%	86 / 550	DSP-ANAP-MHP
2002	Mesut Yılmaz	1,618,465	5.13%	0 / 550	AK Party
