= Left of Center (Turkey) =

Political ideology in Turkey

Left of Center (Turkish: Ortanın solu) was a popular political ideology in the 1960s and 1970s in Turkey.

== Background ==
Turkish Constitution of 1961 was a more democratic constitution than the previous constitution. A number of new parties were founded, including socialist parties. Among them Workers Party of Turkey (TİP) created some sensation. Republican People's Party (CHP), which is the oldest party and known as the founder of the Republic, was also influenced by the socialist discourse.

== Early years of "left to center" ==
Starting from the 1965 election campaign, CHP speakers began using the slogan "left of center". Both the party leader İsmet İnönü and Bülent Ecevit, the former Minister of Labour defined the CHP position in the political spectrum as "left of center". İnönü in an interview said, "Actually we are already a left-to-center party after embracing Laïcité (secularity) If you are populist, you are (also) at the left of center." In another interview İnönü said that the party was a statist party and this was left of center. İnönü was referring to the Kemalist ideology (the traditional ideology of the party) and the three of the six arrows in the party flag namely; laicism, populism and statism. Thus according to him the party was already left of the center. However unlike İnönü, Ecevit was trying to shift the general policy of the party to the left. Although he did not exclude Kemalism, he tried to transform the party into a social democratic party while avoiding using the words social democratic. His most sensational objective was summarized by the slogan he used during the election campaign on 11 August 1969: Toprak işleyenin, su kullananın ("Soil belongs to those who cultivate it and water belongs to those who use it.").

== Split in the party ==
CHP

CHP rivals accused left-of-center politics as communism and they created a slogan "Ortanın Solu, Moskova'nın yolu" meaning "left of center, way of Moscow." Bülent Ecevit's new policy caused also an interparty strife between Ecevit and Turhan Feyzioğlu, CHP group leader in parliament. In 1966 Ecevit was elected as the secretary general of the party and for a while the party secretary and the group leader engaged in a war of public notices. Finally Feyzioğlu and his supporters left the party and founded Reliance Party in 1967. After a second split, which made way to Republican Party in 1972, and the resignation of İsmet İnönü on 8 May 1972, Bülent Ecevit became the leader of the party.

== Leader of CHP ==
Until the 1970s, CHP was known as a party of intellectuals and had difficulty gaining support among blue-collar workers and villagers. During Bülent Ecevit's leadership the party began to gain support among the working class. Umudumuz Ecevit ("Our hope Ecevit"), Halkçı Ecevit ("Populist Ecevit") and Karaoğlan ("Brunet Boy", a popular folk hero) were Bülent Ecevit's epithets. Ecevit served a prime minister of Turkey three times before 1980; in the 37th, 40th and the 42nd government of Turkey. In 1977 elections CHP's support peaked at 41%, but during the 42nd government the popularity of the party began to decrease. Following the 1980 Turkish coup d'état, all parties (right and left) were closed by the military rule. But even before the closure of the party, Ecevit resigned from his post on 30 October 1980.

== After the coup ==
In 1983, military rule decided to turn to civilian regime and allowed the formation of new parties albeit with severe restrictions. According to instructions, the new parties were not allowed to use the names of the former parties and senior politicians were not allowed to be the charter member of the new parties. Furthermore, military rule had the power of rejecting the founders. This gave the military rule a privilege to limit the number of parties that would attend the coming parliamentary elections. It was clear that neither Bülent Ecevit nor the other notable left-of-center politician would participate in the elections which would be held on 6 November 1983. Under these circumstances, CHP partisans founded two new parties; Social Democracy Party (SODEP) of Erdal İnönü, a physics professor and late İsmet İnönü's son, and People's Party (HP) of Necdet Calp, a former bureaucrat.

In the 1983 elections, military rule banned SODEP and consequently moderate HP became the main opposition party. However, in 1984 local elections SODEP gained about three times as much votes than the HP. Aydın Güven Gürkan, the new leader of HP tried to ally with Bülent Ecevit. But Bülent Ecevit was reluctant. Instead Erdal İnönü and Aydın Güven Gürkan agreed on a plan to merge their parties. On 2 November 1985 the two parties merged under the name Social Democrat People's Party (SHP).

According to 1982 Constitution of Turkey, Bülent Ecevit could not participate in politics. As such, his wife Rahşan Ecevit founded Democratic Left Party (DSP) on 14 November 1985, i.e., only twelve days after the other two parties merged. None of these parties used left-of-center slogan. However, the name of Rahşan Ecevit's party used the phrase "democratic left", which evoked "left of center".

== Aftermath ==
In 1987, SHP was the main opposition party. On 6 September 1987, the ban on the former politicians was lifted as a result of Constitutional referendum. While the governing party campaigned for "no", SHP leader Erdal İnönü as well as the other opposition leaders, campaigned for "yes". However, this was not advantageous to SHP. Because charismatic Bülent Ecevit now the leader of DSP became a serious rival of SHP.

In 1992, SHP was a coalition partner. On 19 April, Erdal İnönü was instrumental on lifting the ban on former political parties. But this again was not advantageous to SHP. This was because on 9 September 1992, CHP was refounded; as a result, SHP lost a part of its supporters to CHP. The local elections held on 27 March 1994 showed that the social democrat votes were divided between three parties. Thus SHP leader Murat Karayalçın and CHP leader Deniz Baykal agreed on another merge plan. On 18 February 1995, the parties merged. Although SHP was the bigger party, upon former SHP leader Erdal İnönü's suggestion, the new party continued as CHP. DSP leader Bülent Ecevit once again stood aside.

== Gallery ==
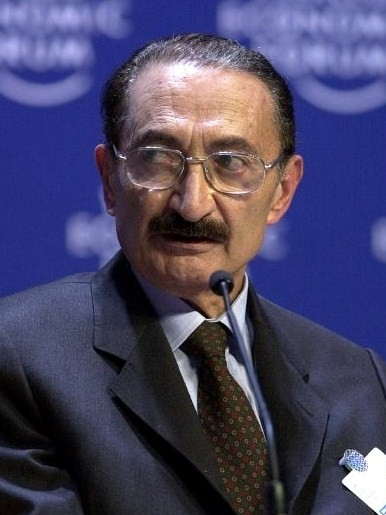
Bülent Ecevit

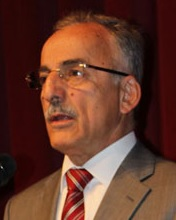
Murat Karayalçın

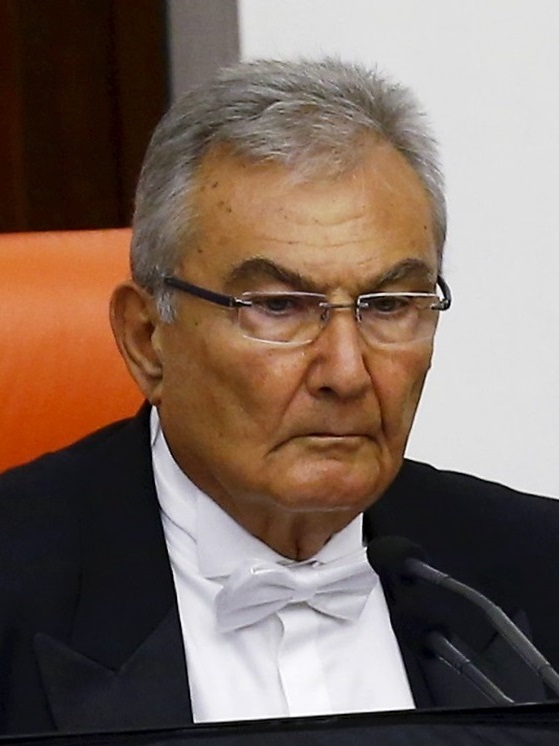
Deniz Baykal

== See also ==
- Politics of Turkey
