= List of party leaders in Turkey =

Below is the list of party leaders (former and present) in Turkey. Only the leaders of parties which were present in the parliament or received a considerable percentage of votes are shown.

== The list ==
Start	Name	Parties
1923	Mustafa Kemal Atatürk	CHP
1924	Kâzım Karabekir	TCF
1930	Fethi Okyar	SCF
1938	İsmet İnönü	CHP
1946	Nuri Demirağ	MKP
1946	Celâl Bayar	DP
1948	Hikmet Bayur	MP
1950	Adnan Menderes	DP
1954	Osman Bölükbaşı	CMP-CKMP-MP2
1955	Ekrem Hayri Üstündağ	HURP
1955	Fevzi Lütfi Karaosmanoğlu	HURP
1961	Ekrem Alican	YTP
1961	Ragıp Gümüşpala	AP
1962	Ahmet Oğuz	CKMP
1962	Mehmet Ali Aybar	TİP
1964	Süleyman Demirel	AP-DYP
1965	Alparslan Türkeş	CKMP-MHP
1967	Turhan Feyzioğlu	GP-CGP
1967	Hüseyin Balan	TBP
1969	Mustafa Timisi	TBP
1970	Ferruh Bozbeyli	DP2
1970	Behice Boran	TİP
1970	Necmettin Erbakan	MNP-MSP-RP-SP
1972	Bülent Ecevit	CHP-DSP
1972	Kemal Satır	CP
1983	Turgut Sunalp	MDP
1983	Turgut Özal	ANAP
1983	Necdet Calp	HP
1983	Erdal İnönü	SODEP-SHP
1983	Ahmet Nusret Tuna	DYP
1983	Cezmi Kartay	SODEP
1983	Yıldırım Avcı	DYP
1983	Ahmet Tekdal	RP
1995	Hüsamettin Cindoruk	DYP-DTRP
1985	Aydın Güven Gürkan	HP-SHP
1985	Ülkü Söylemezoğlu	MDP
1985	Rahşan Ecevit	DSP
1986	Mehmet Yazar	HDP
1988	Necdet Karababa	DSP
1989	Yıldırım Akbulut	ANAP
1991	Mesut Yılmaz	ANAP
1992	Doğu Perinçek	İP-VP
1993	Muhsin Yazıcıoğlu	BBP
1993	Tansu Çiller	DYP
1993	Murat Karayalçın	SHP
1994	Deniz Baykal	CHP
1994	Besim Tibuk	LDP
1995	Hikmet Çetin	CHP
1997	Devlet Bahçeli	MHP
1998	Yıldırım Tuğrul Türkeş	ATP
1998	Recai Kutan	FP
1999	Altan Öymen	CHP
2000	Ahmet Türk	DTP
2001	Recep Tayyip Erdoğan	AKP
2002	İsmail Cem	YTP2
2004	Zeki Sezer	DSP
2005	Cem Toker	LDP
2005	Yaşar Nuri Öztürk	HYP
2008	Numan Kurtulmuş	FP
2009	Masum Türker	DSP
2010	Kemal Kılıçdaroğlu	CHP
2012	Selahattin Demirtaş	HDP
2014	Ahmet Davutoğlu	AKP
2016	Binali Yıldırım	AKP
2016	Temel Karamollaoğlu	SP
2017	Meral Akşener	İYİ
2017	Erkan Baş	TİP
2018	Fatih Erbakan	YRP
2019	Ahmet Davutoğlu	GP
2020	Ali Babacan	DEVA
2020	Öztürk Yılmaz	YP
2020	Mustafa Sarıgül	TDP
2021	Muharrem İnce	MP
2021	Ümit Özdağ	ZP
2023	Özgür Özel	CHP

== Key ==
CHP:
TCF:
SCF:
MKP:
DP:
CMP:
CMP:
HURP:
CKMP:
MP2:
YTP:
AP:
MHP:
GP:
CGP:
DP2:
TİP:
CP:
MNP:
MSP:
RP:
FP:
SP:
TBP:
DSP:
MDP:
ANAP:
HP:
SODEP:
DYP:
İP:
LDP:
VP:
BBP:
ATP:
SHP:
DTRP
DTP:
AKP:
YTP2:
HYP:
HDP:
YRP:
İYİ:
TİP:
GP:
DEVA:
YP:
TDP:
MP:
ZP:

Republican People's Party
Progressive Republican Party (Turkey)
Liberal Republican Party (Turkey)
National Development Party (Turkey)
Democrat Party (Turkey, historical)
Nation Party (Turkey, 1948)
Republican Nation Party
Liberty Party (Turkey)
Republican Peasants' Nation Party
Nation Party (Turkey, 1962)
New Turkey Party (1961)
Justice Party (Turkey)
Nationalist Movement Party
Reliance Party
Republican Reliance Party
Democratic Party (Turkey, 1970)
Workers Party of Turkey
Republican Party (Turkey)
National Order Party
National Salvation Party
Welfare Party
Virtue Party
Felicity Party
Turkey Unity Party
Democratic Left Party (Turkey)
Nationalist Democracy Party (Turkey)
Motherland Party (Turkey)
People's Party (Turkey)
Social Democracy Party (Turkey)
True Path Party
Workers' Party (Turkey)
Patriotic Party (Turkey)
Great Unity Party
Liberal Democratic Party (Turkey)
Bright Turkey Party
Social Democratic Populist Party (Turkey)
Democrat Turkey Party
Democratic Society Party
Justice and Development Party (Turkey)
New Turkey Party (2002)
People's Ascent Party
People's Democracy Party (Turkey)
New Welfare Party
Good Party
Workers' Party of Turkey (2017)
Future Party (Turkey)
Democracy and Progress Party
Innovation Party (Turkey)
Movement for Change in Turkey
Homeland Party (Turkey, 2021)
Victory Party

== Gallery ==
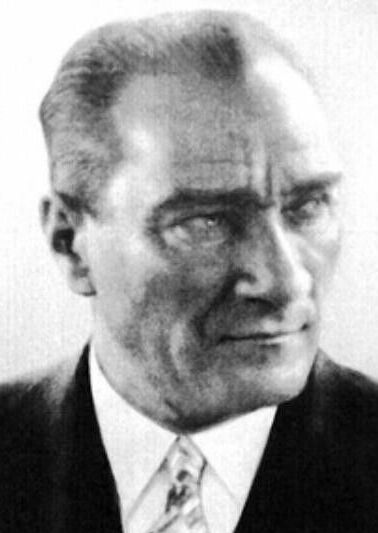
Mustafa Kemal Atatürk

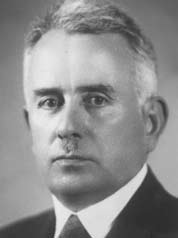
Kâzım Karabekir

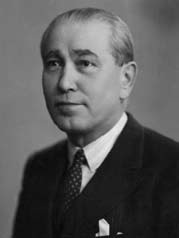
Fethi Okyar

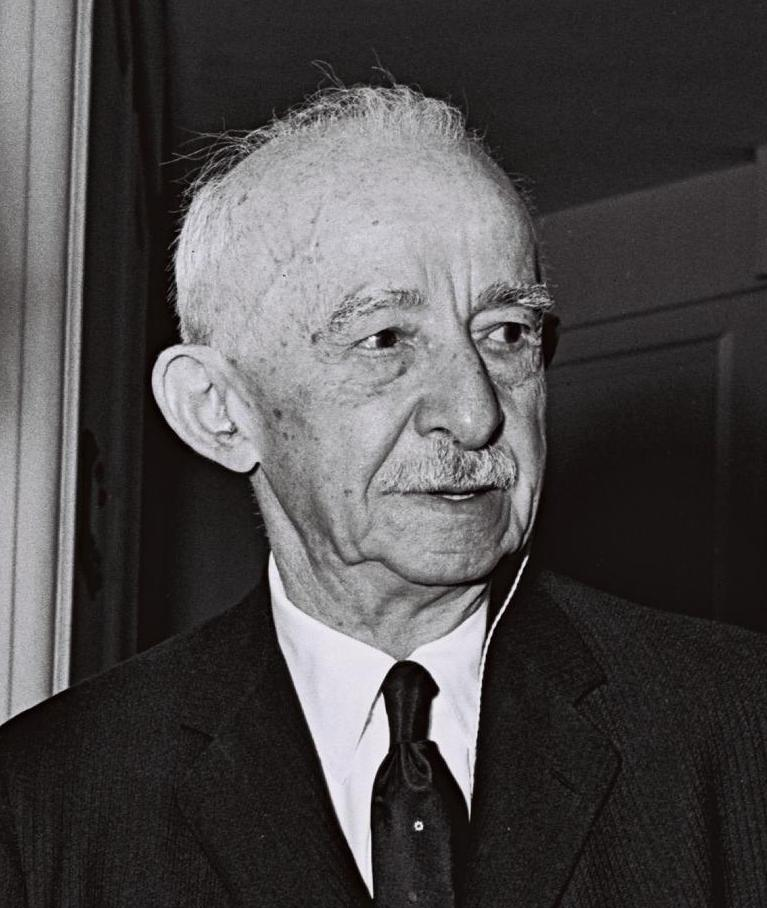
İsmet İnönü

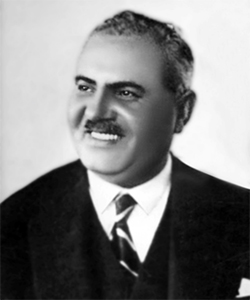
Nuri Demirağ

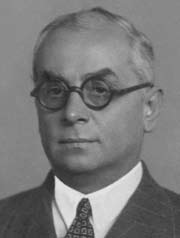
Celâl Bayar

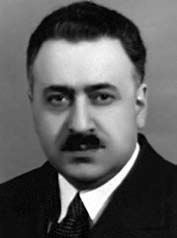
Hikmet Bayur

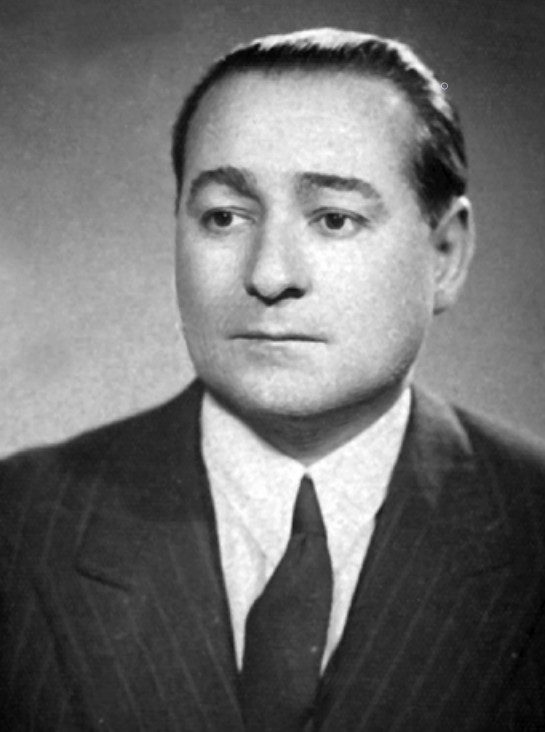
Adnan Menderes

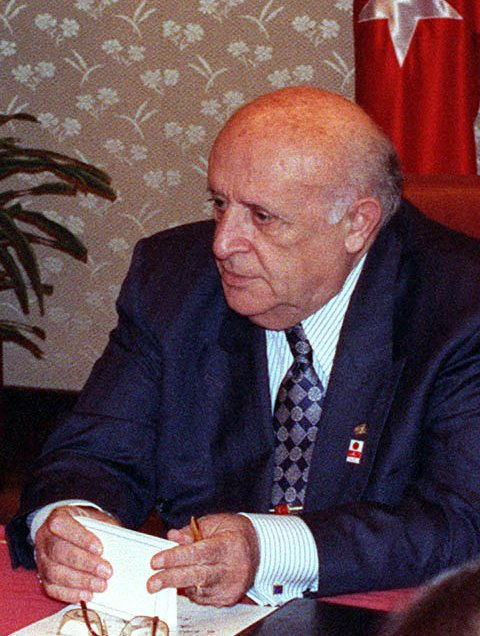
Süleyman Demirel

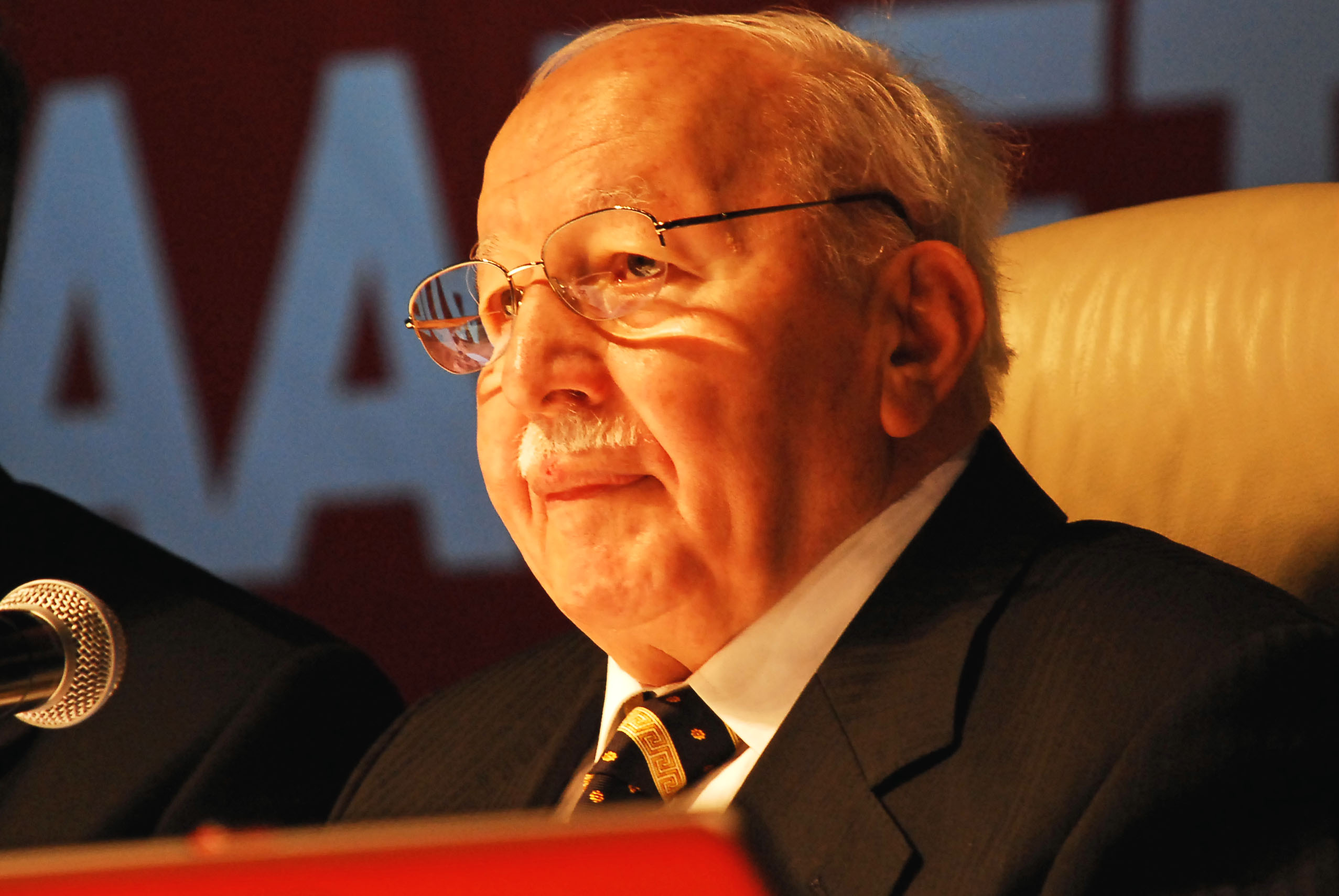
Necmettin Erbakan

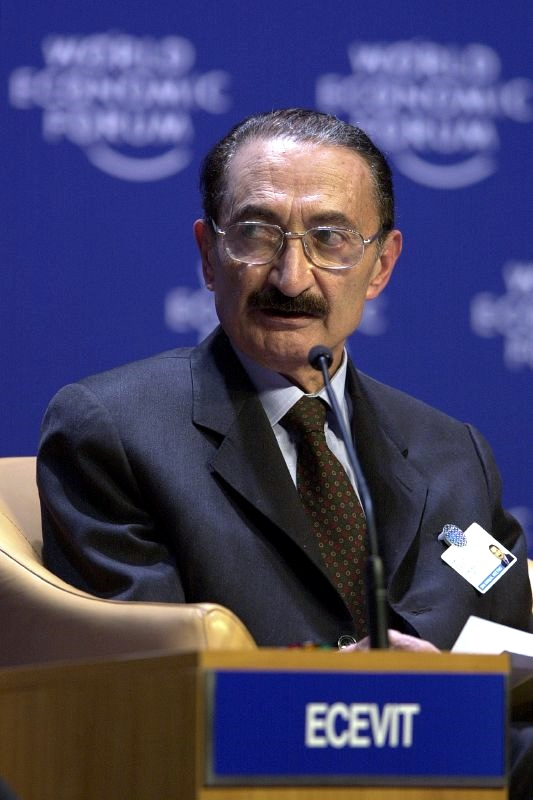
Bülent Ecevit

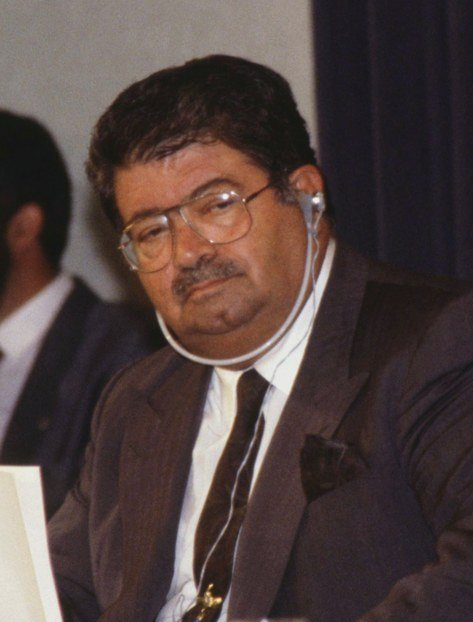
Turgut Özal

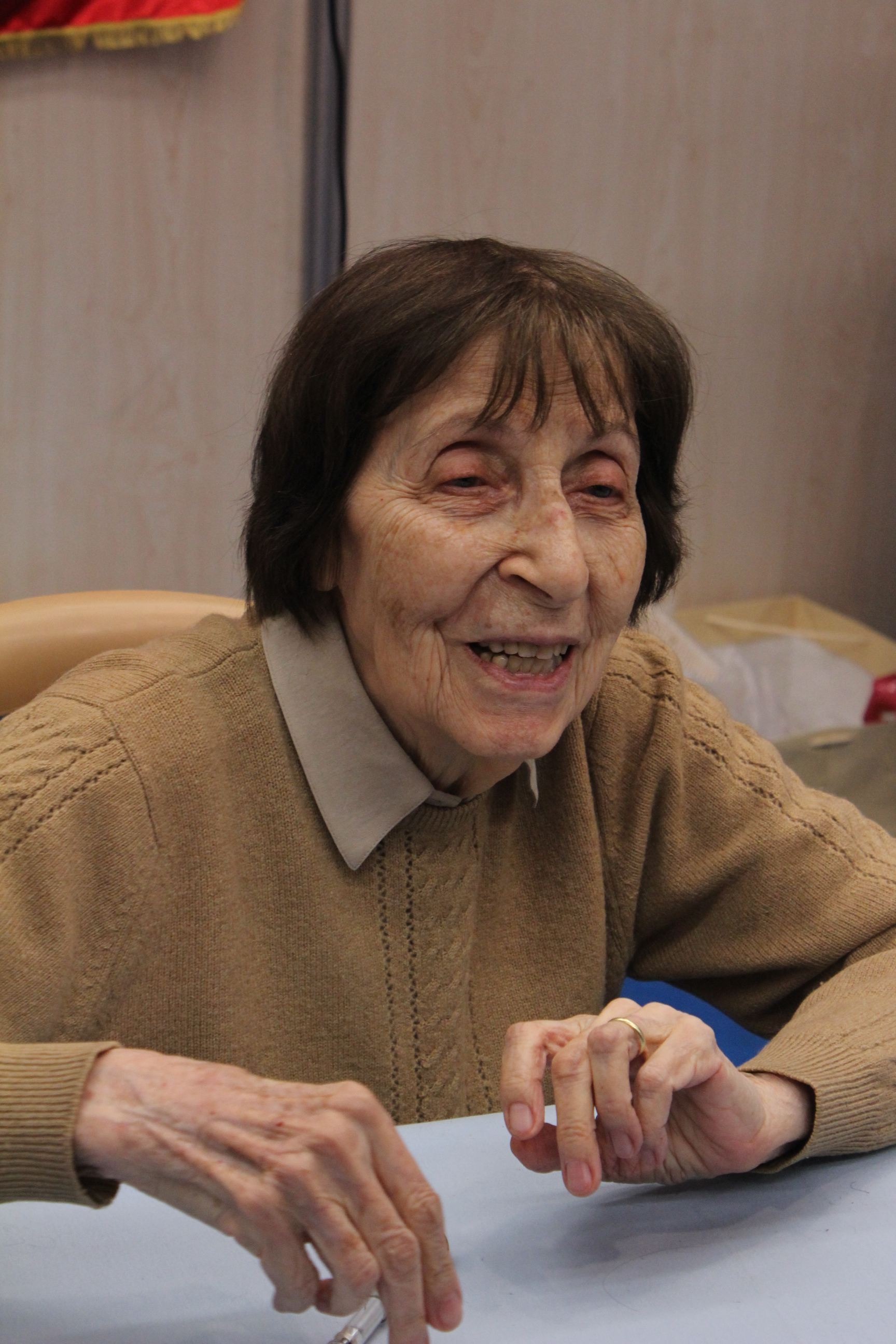
Rahşan Ecevit

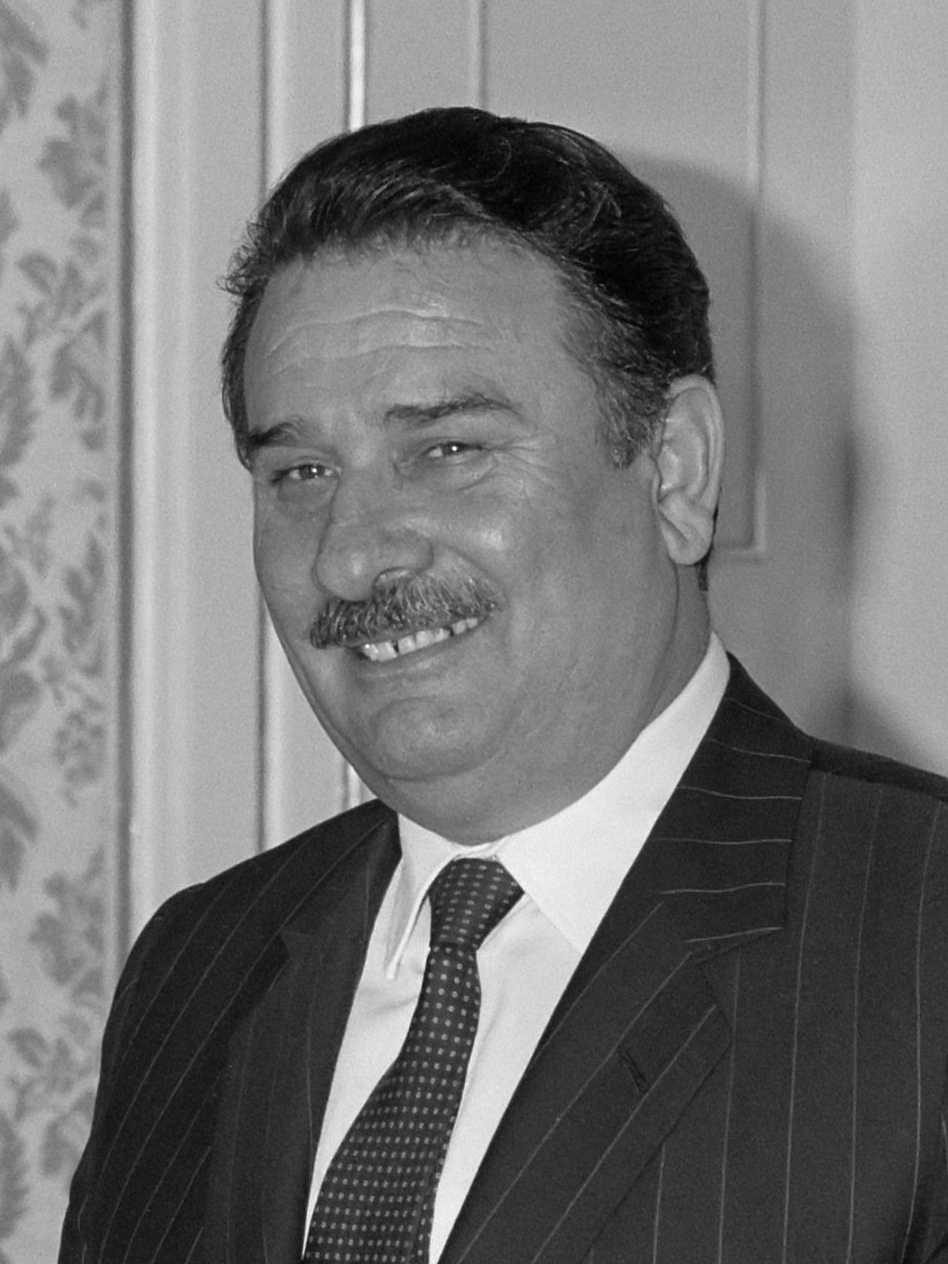
Yıldırım Akbulut

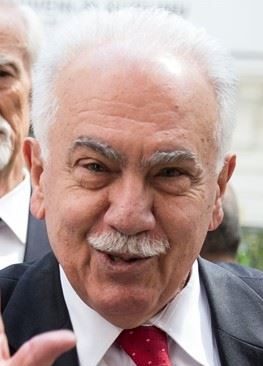
Doğu Perinçek

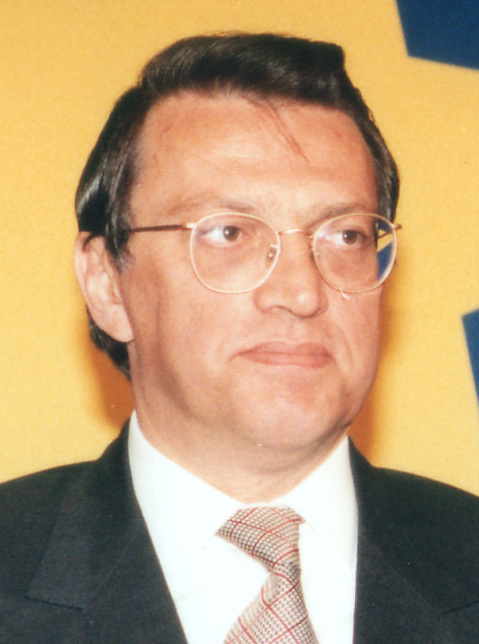
Mesut Yılmaz

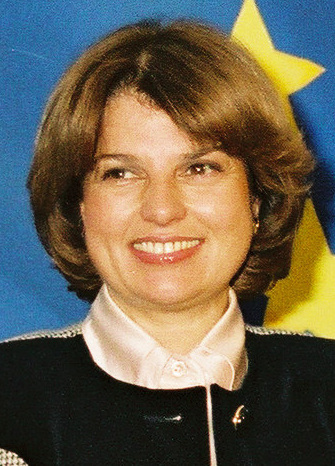
Tansu Çiller

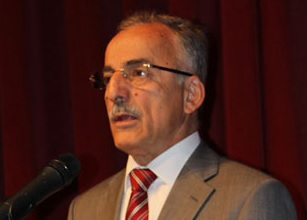
Murat Karayalçın

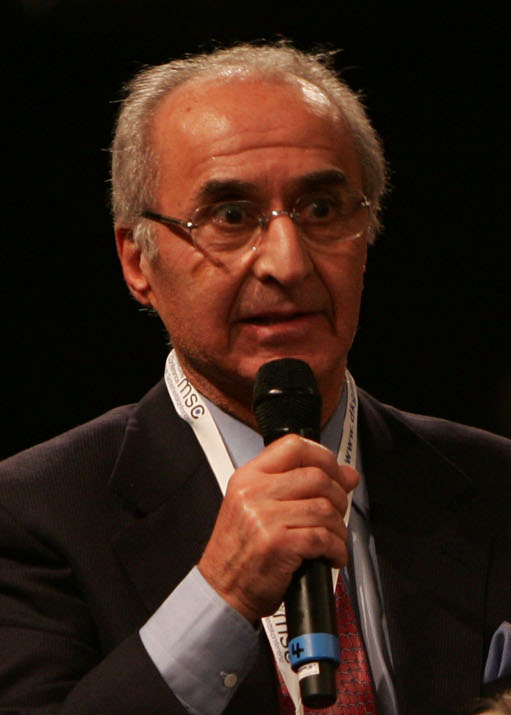
Hikmet Çetin

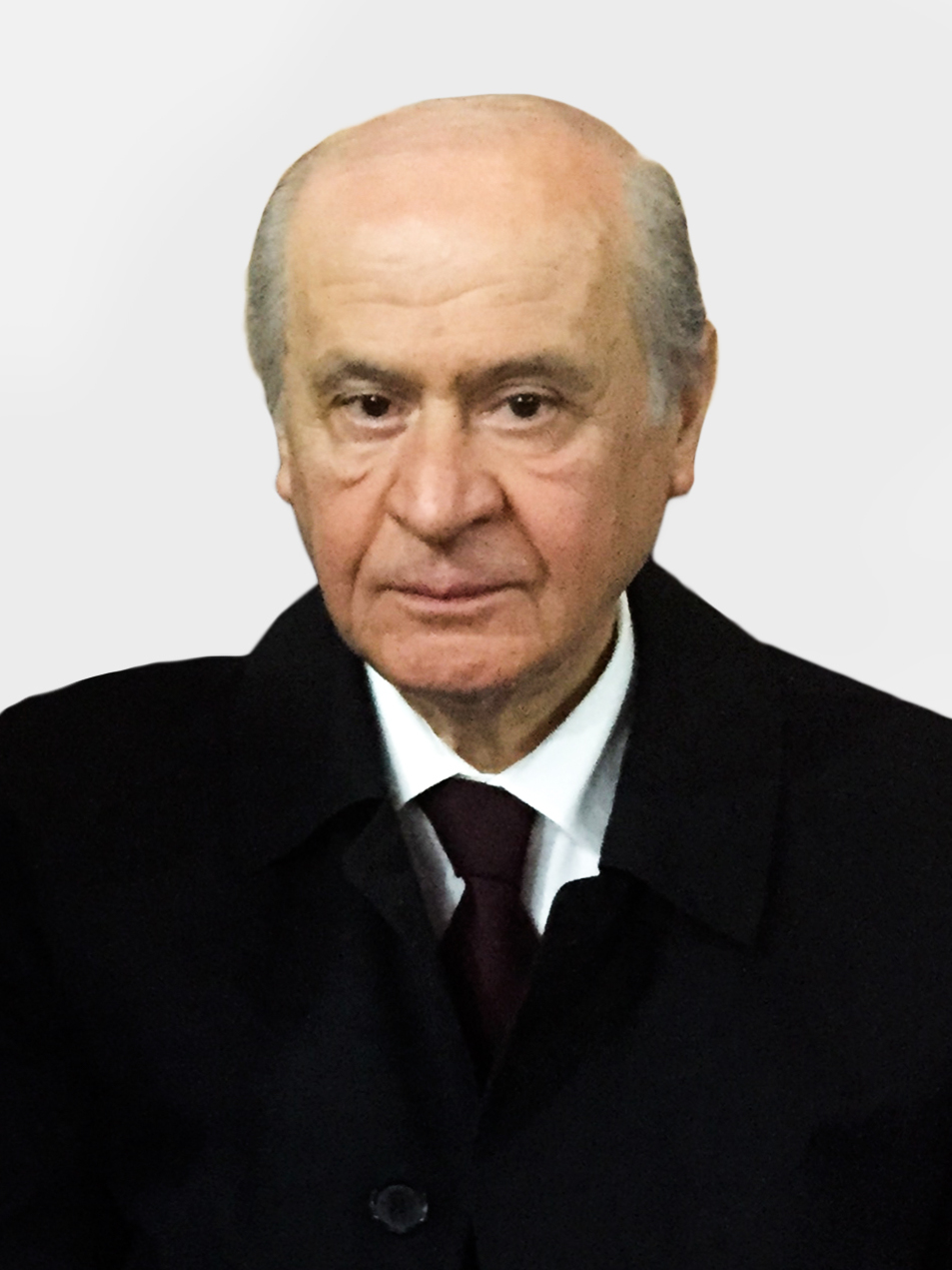
Devlet Bahçeli

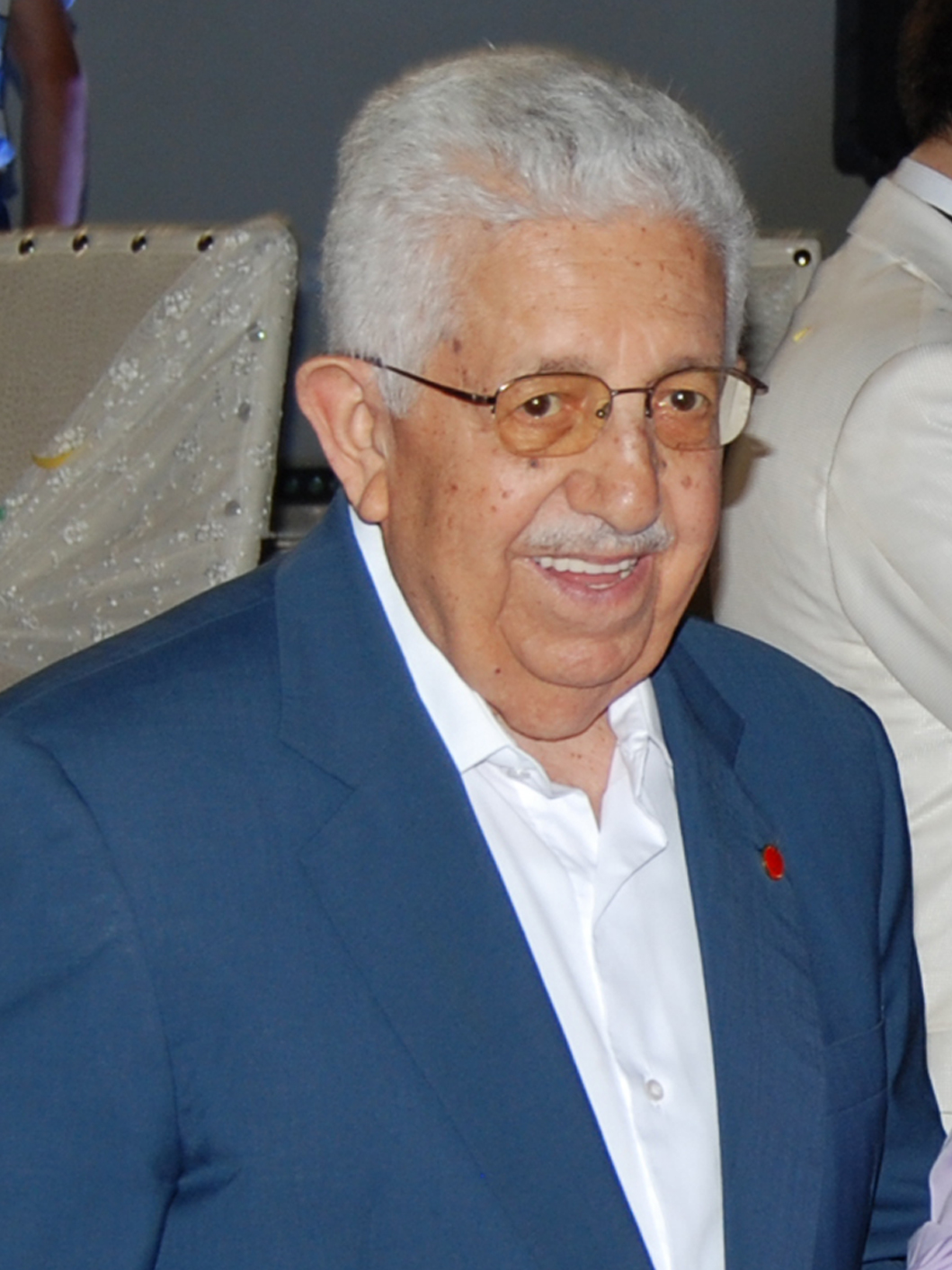
Recai Kutan

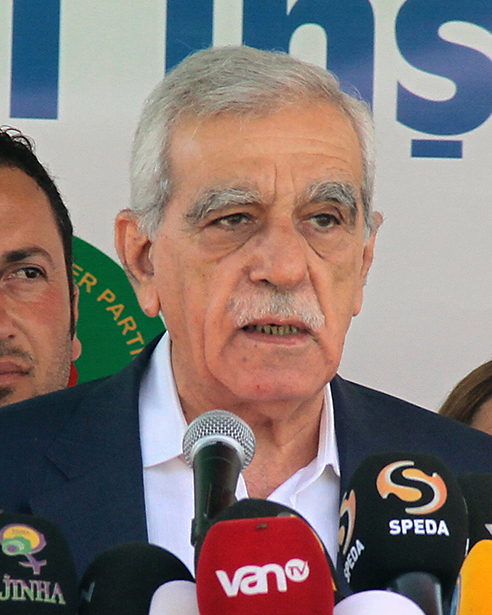
Ahmet Türk

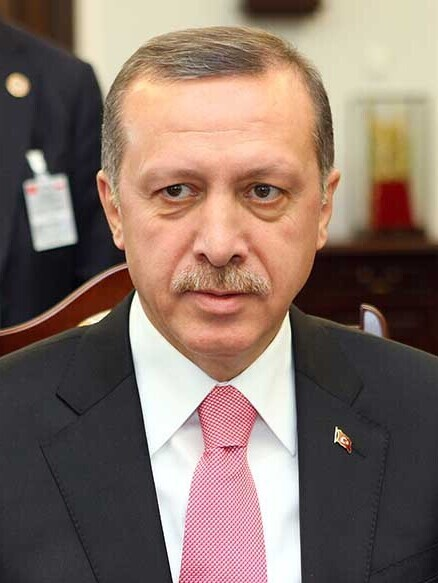
Recep Tayyip Erdoğan

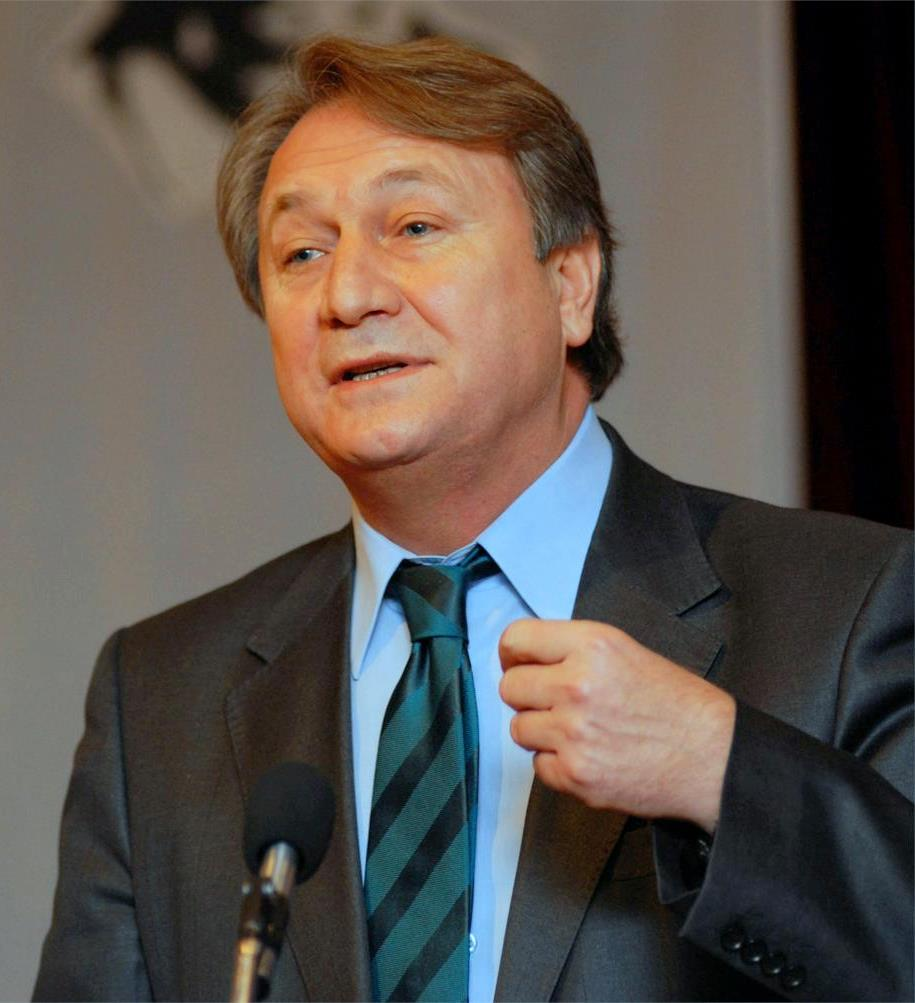
Mehmet Zeki Sezer

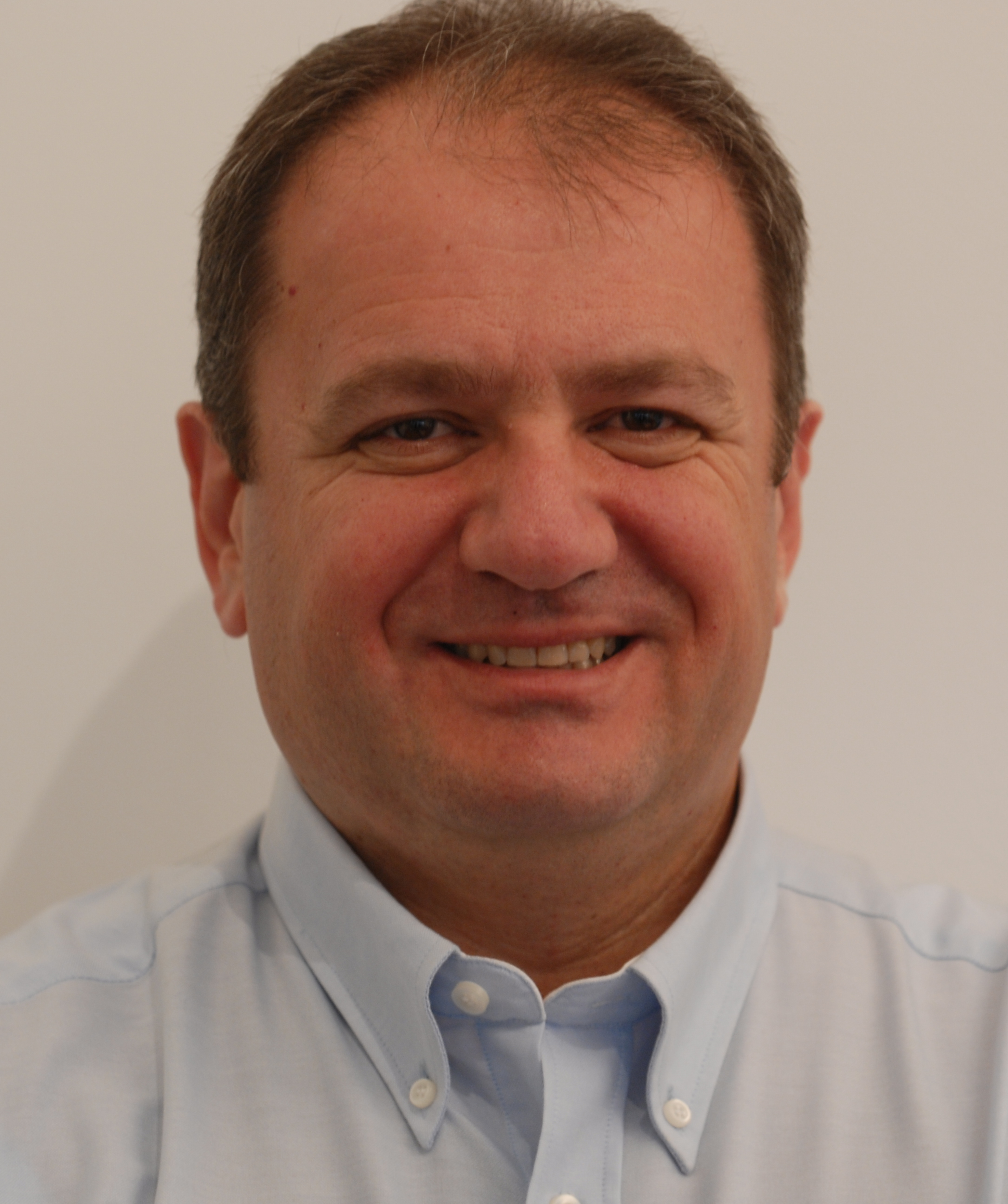
Cem Toker

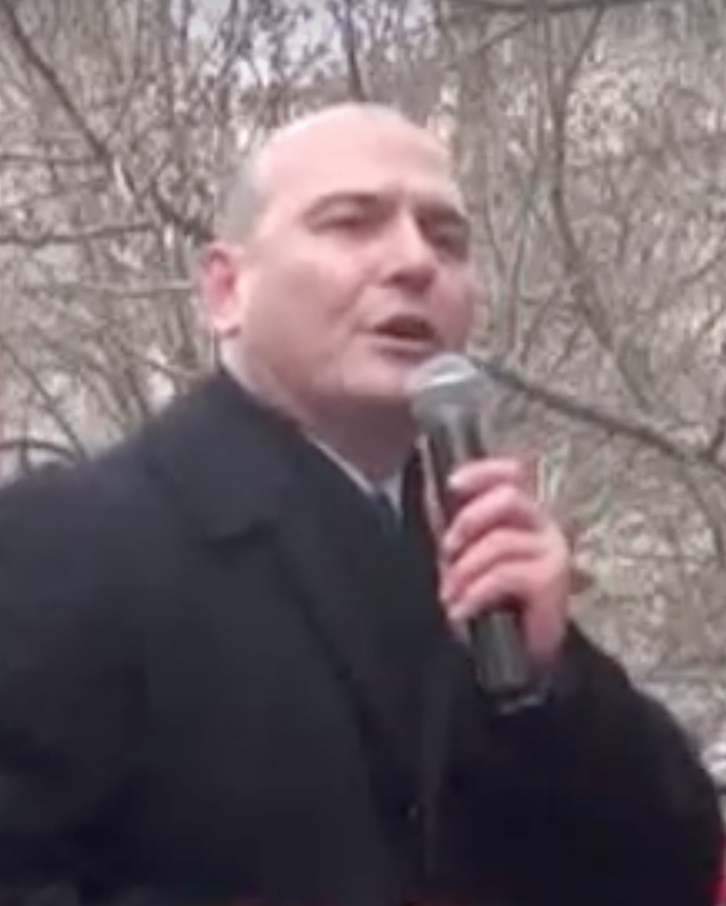
Süleyman Soylu

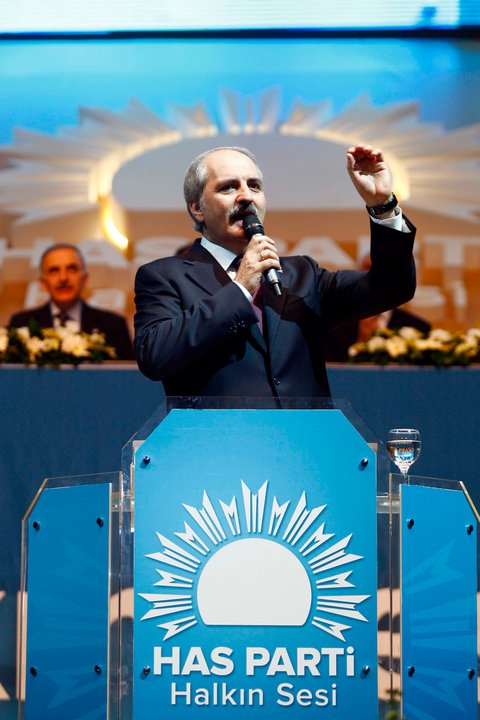
Numan Kurtulmuş

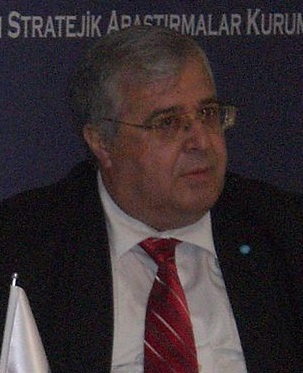
Masum Türker

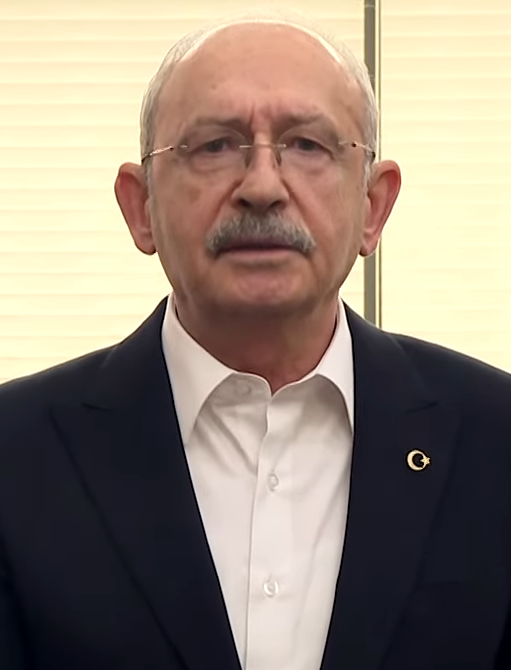
Kemal Kılıçdaroğlu

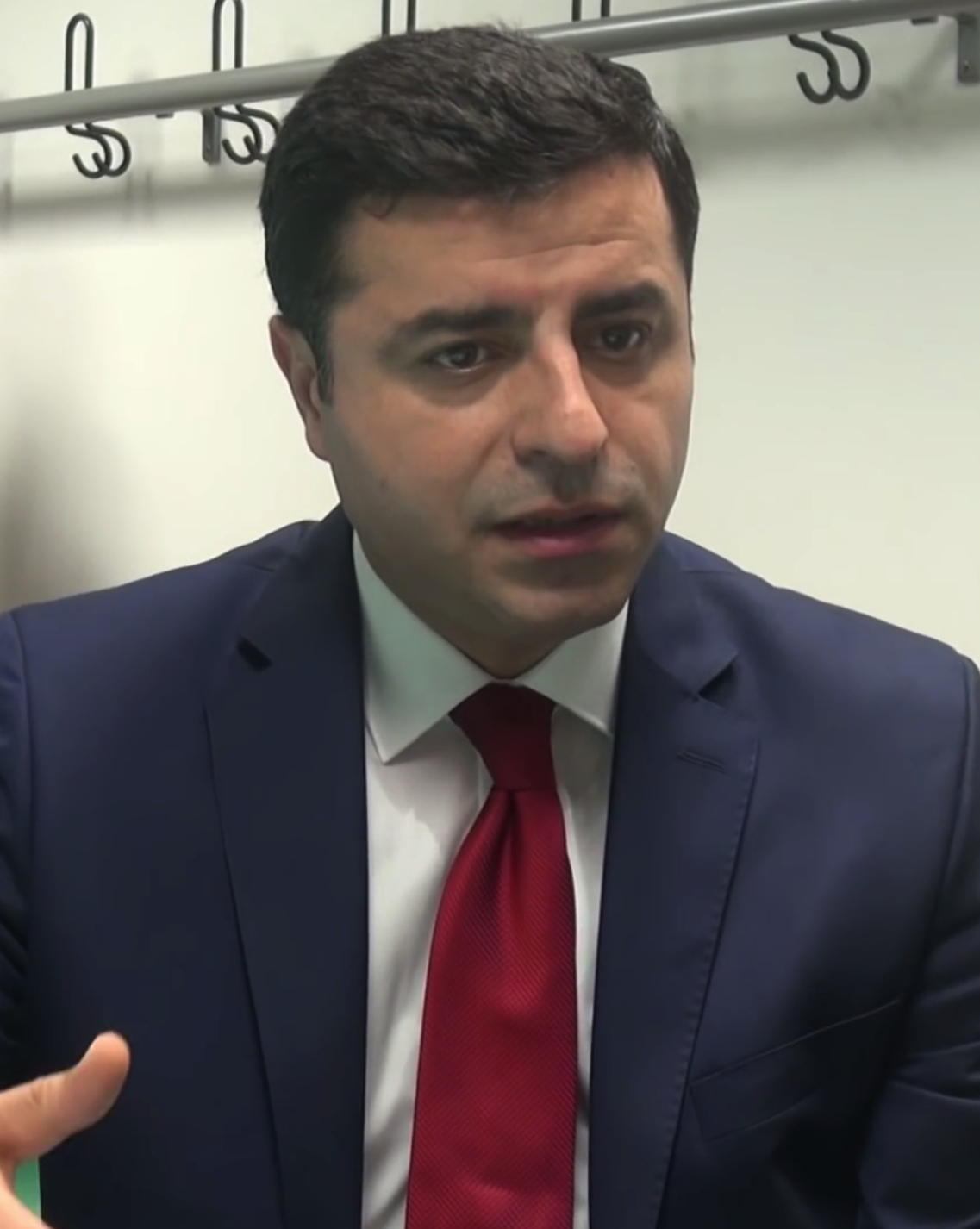
Selahattin Demirtaş

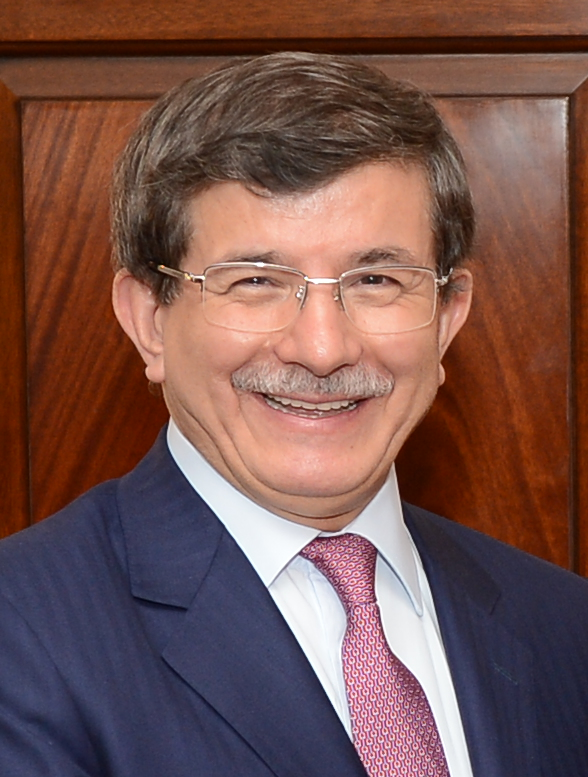
Ahmet Davutoğlu

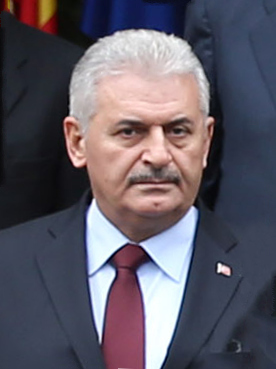
Binali Yıldırım

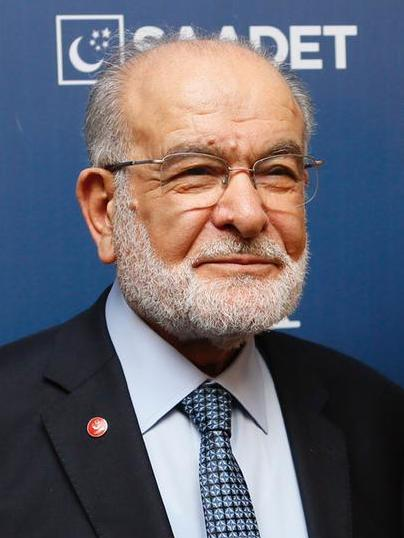
Temel Karamollaoğlu

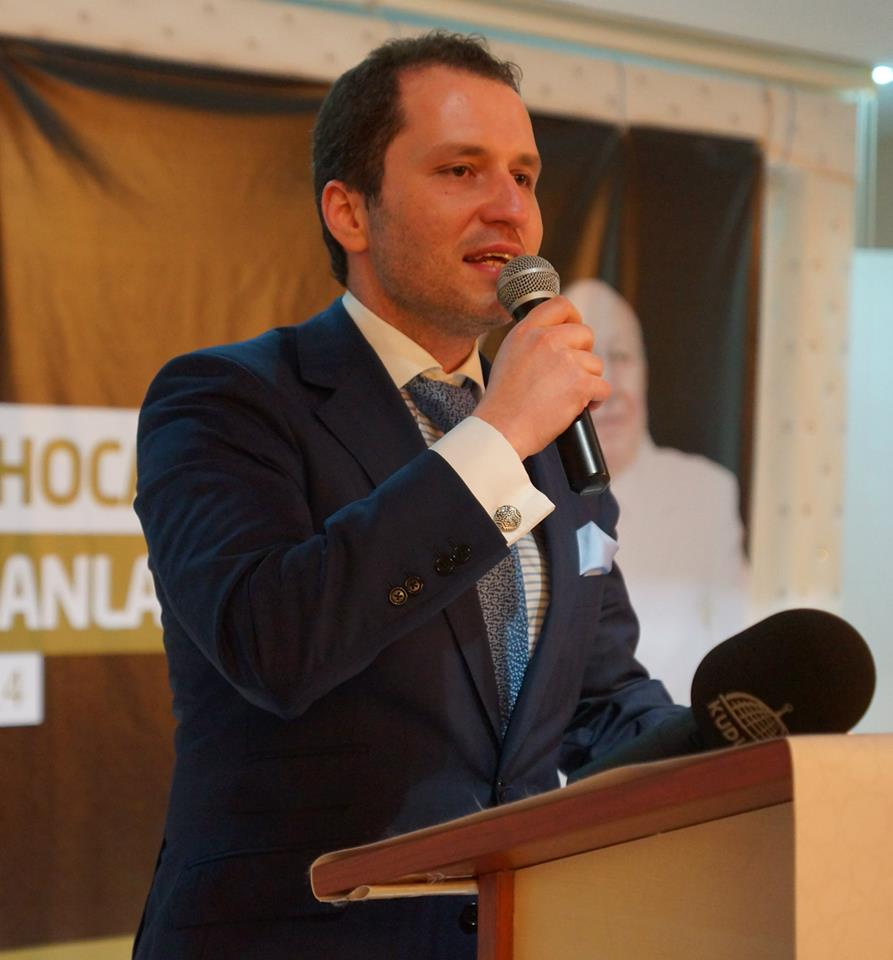
Fatih Erbakan

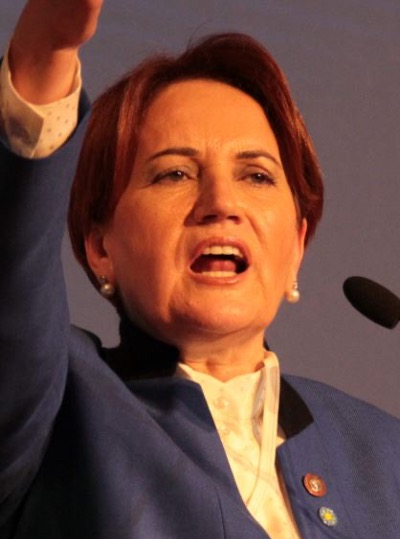
Meral Akşener

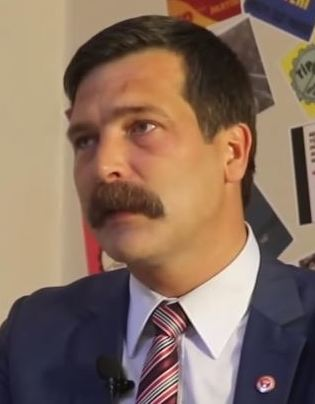
Erkan Baş

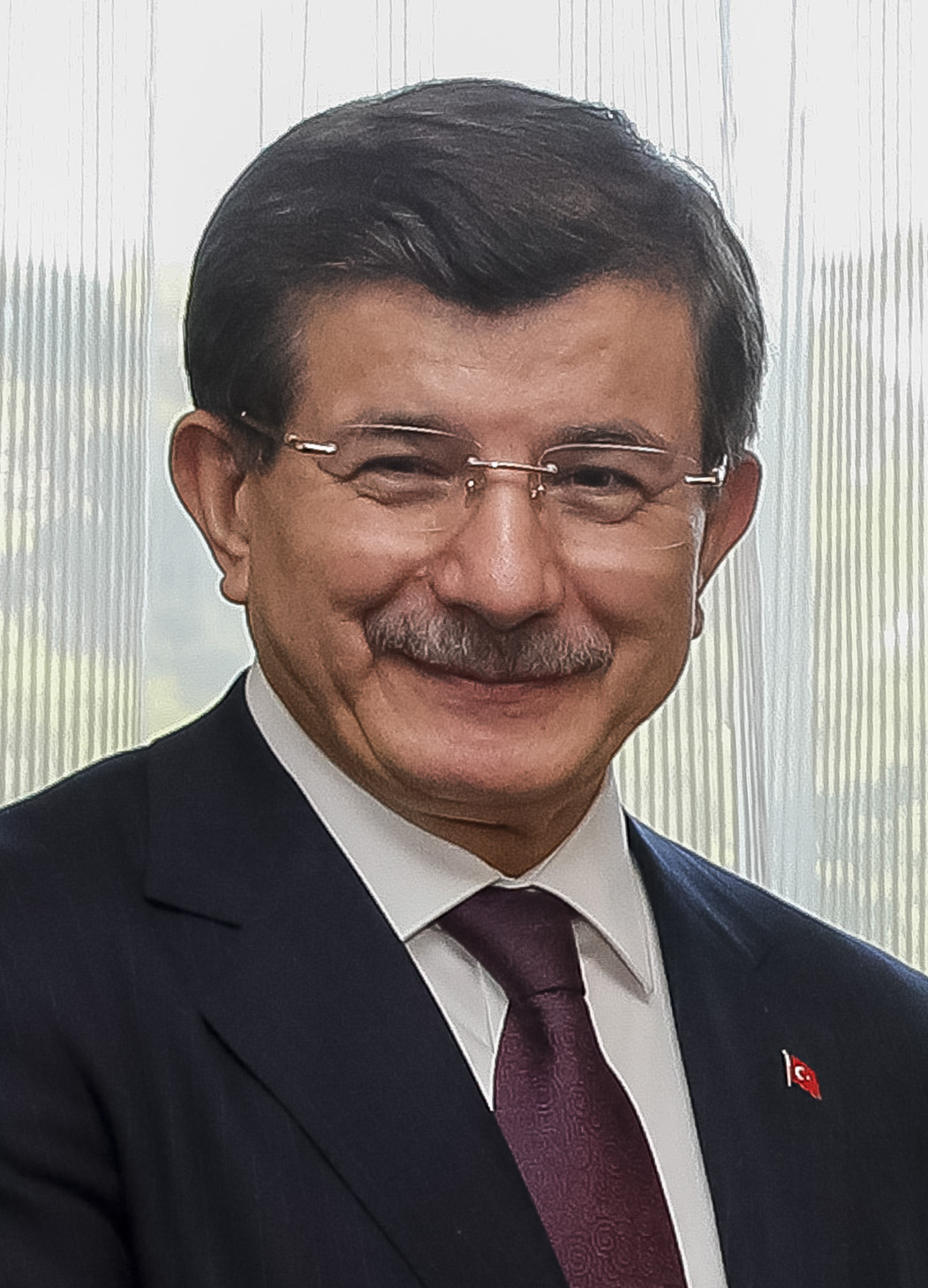
Ahmet Davutoğlu

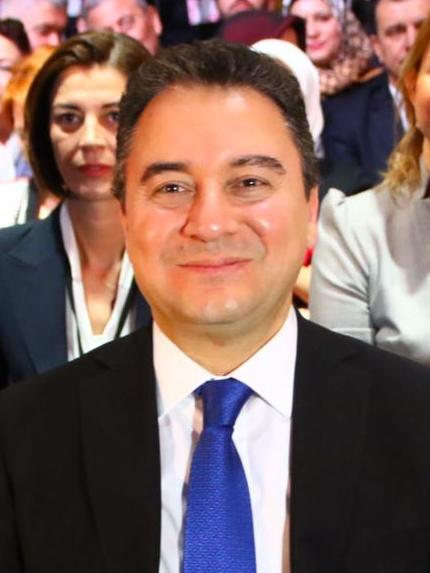
Ali Babacan

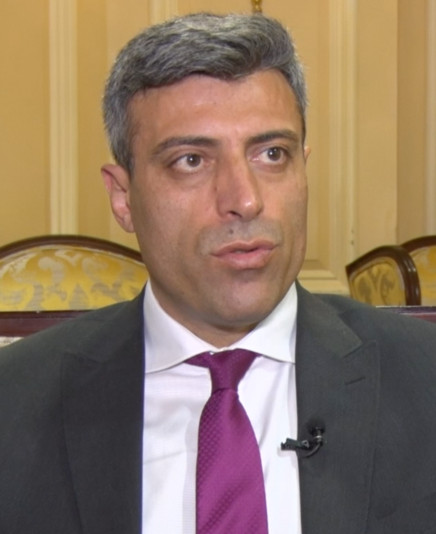
Öztürk Yılmaz

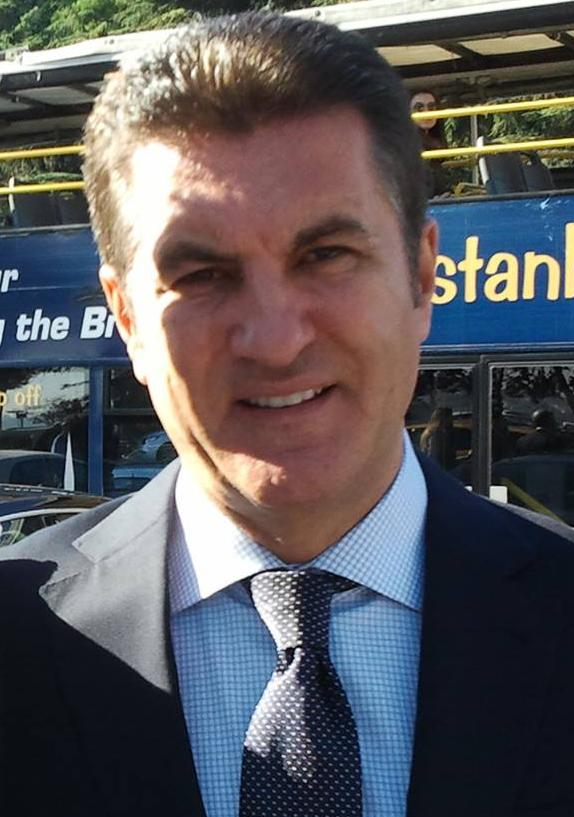
Mustafa Sarıgül

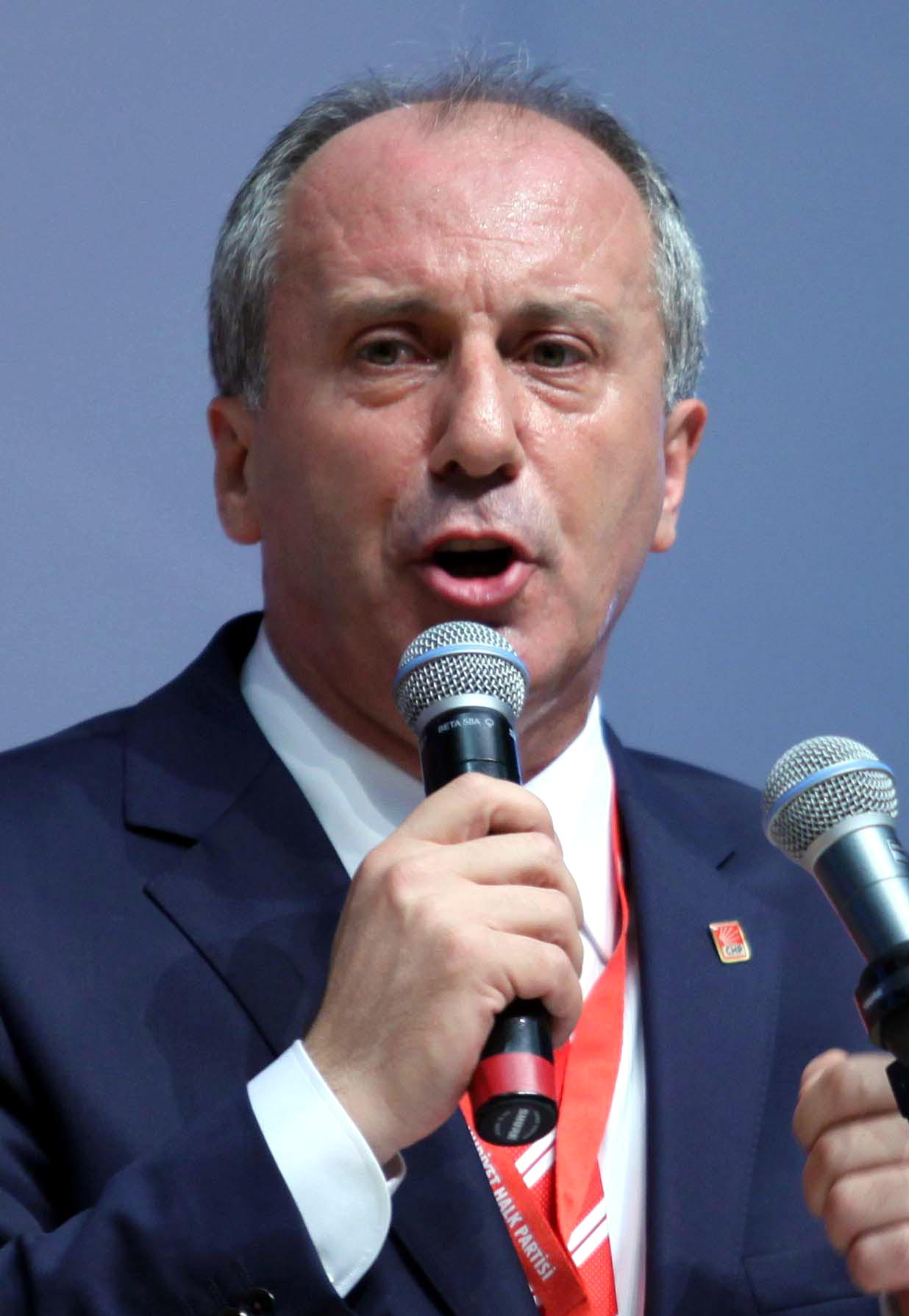
Muharrem İnce

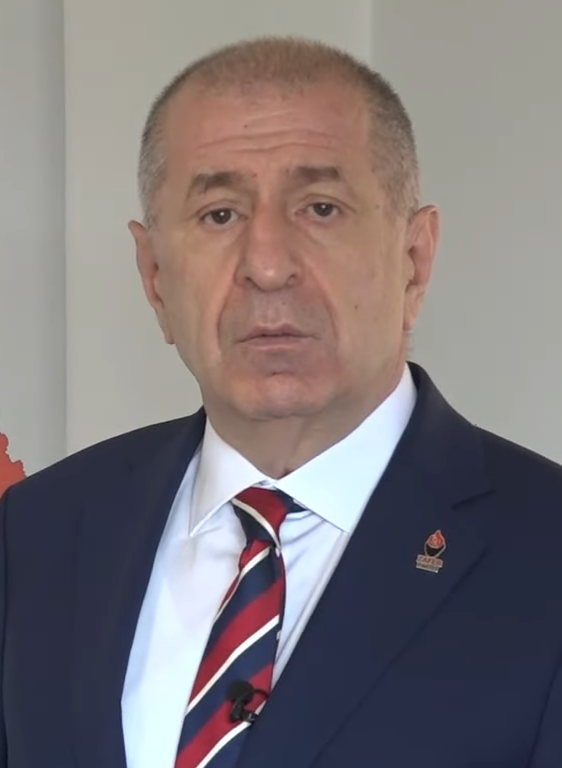
Ümit Özdağ

== See also ==
- List of political parties in Turkey
