= List of historical parties in Turkey =

Below is the list of historical parties in Turkey. In this list, the parties that merged to create another party are also shown. Parties that were closed by the military rule in 1981 and continued with the same name afterwards are not shown.

Name	Founded	Closed	Notes about termination
Progressive Republican Party	1924	1925	Banned
Liberal Republican Party	1930	1930	Self dissolved
National Development Party	1945	1958	Ceased to exist
Democrat Party	1946	1960	Banned
Nation Party	1948	1953	Banned
Democratic Labour Party	1950	1954	Self dissolved
Republican Nation Party	1954	1958	Fusion and renaming
Liberty Party	1955	1958	Self dissolved
Republican Villagers Nation Party	1958	1968	Change identity and name
New Turkey Party	1961	1973	Self dissolved
Workers Party of Turkey	1961	1980	Banned
Justice Party	1961	1981	Closed by the military rule
Nation Party (Turkey, 1962)	1962	1977	Self dissolved
Republican Reliance Party	1967	1981	Closed by the military rule
National Order Party	1970	1971	Banned
Democratic Party	1970	1980	Self dissolved
Republican Party	1972	1973	Merged into Republican Confidence Party
National Women's Party of Turkey	1972	1981	Closed by the military rule
National Salvation Party	1972	1981	Closed by the military rule
Socialist Revolution Party	1975	1995	Self dissolved
Nationalist Democracy Party	1983	1986	Self dissolved
Great Turkey Party	1983	1983	Banned
Motherland Party (ANAP)	1983	2007	Merged with True Path Party
People's Party	1983	1985	Merged with SODEP
Social Democracy Party (SODEP)	1983	1985	Merged with People's Party
Welfare Party	1983	1998	Banned
Social Democratic Populist Party	1985	1995	Merged into Republican People's Party
Liberal Democrat Party	1986	1986	Merged to ANAP
Great Anatolia Party	1986	1992	Self dissolved
Democratic Center Party	1990	1991	Merged into True Path Party
People's Labor Party	1990	1993	Banned
Democracy Party	1993	1994	Banned
People’s Democracy Party	1994	2003	Banned
Democrat Turkey Party	1997	2008	Merged to another party
Virtue Party	1997	2001	Islamist Party; banned for violating the secularist articles of the Constitution
New Turkey Party	2002	2004	Merged into Republican People's Party
Democratic Society Party	2005	2009	Banned for alleged links to the PKK; succeeded by the Peace and Democracy Party
Democratic Left People's Party	2009	2010	Self dissolved
Peoples' Democratic Party	2012	2023	Due to the risk of her party being shut down; succeeded by the Peoples' Equality and Democracy Party
Future Party	2019	2026	Self dissolved
Homeland Party	2021	2025	Self dissolved
