= Öncel =

Öncel is a Turkish given name and surname. Notable people with the surname include:

- Fuat Necati Öncel (born 1940), Turkish lawyer and politician
- Nazan Öncel (born 1956), Turkish singer-songwriter
- Rıdvan Öncel, Turkish basketball player
