= Fuat Necati Öncel =

Turkish politician

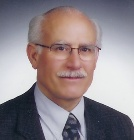
F. N. Öncel

Fuat Necati Öncel (born 1 May 1940 in Şanlıurfa, Turkey) is a Turkish lawyer and politician.

He was born as the son of a hero of independence of Urfa from French invasion in 1920, Hacıisazade Halil Agha who was also a local feudal lord. He graduated from Istanbul University Law School in 1969. He started his legal and political career in Viranşehir, Şanlıurfa. After working at different levels of CHP's Şanlıurfa city organization, he contributed actively in the creation of Social Democrat Party in 1983. He was the chairman of the same party's Şanlıurfa city organization. He is also a founder of Social Democratic Populist Party that was created out of the union between Social Democrat Party and Populist Party and he served as a Member of Central Discipline Committee in that political party. He strongly disagreed with the other members of Social Democratic Populist Party's headquarters in the way the expulsion of some members was carried out and he resigned from his roles in the headquarters but he kept working for the party. He was also actively involved in the process of union of Social Democratic Populist Party and Republican People's Party. In 2001, he resigned from all of his roles and memberships in Republican People's Party. He is married with a lawyer, Melihat Öncel who is the niece of Gazanfer Bilge, wrestling champion of 1948 Olympics held in London and later, a famous businessman in Turkey. They have 2 daughters and 1 son together. His son Ahmet Feyyad Öncel has a PhD in mechanical engineering ("Heat Transfer Enhancement Caused by the Production of Sliding Vapor Bubbles in Laminar Subcooled Flow in a Narrow Channel", University of Houston, Texas, USA).
