= Governor of Ordu =

Governor of a Turkish Province

Governor of Ordu Ordu Valiliği
- Logo of the Governor of Ordu
- Incumbent; Muammer Erol since August 18, 2023
- Appointer: President of Turkey; On the recommendation of the Turkish government
- Term length: No set term length or limit
- Inaugural holder: Fazıl Özelçi; October 4, 1923
- Website: Office of the Governor

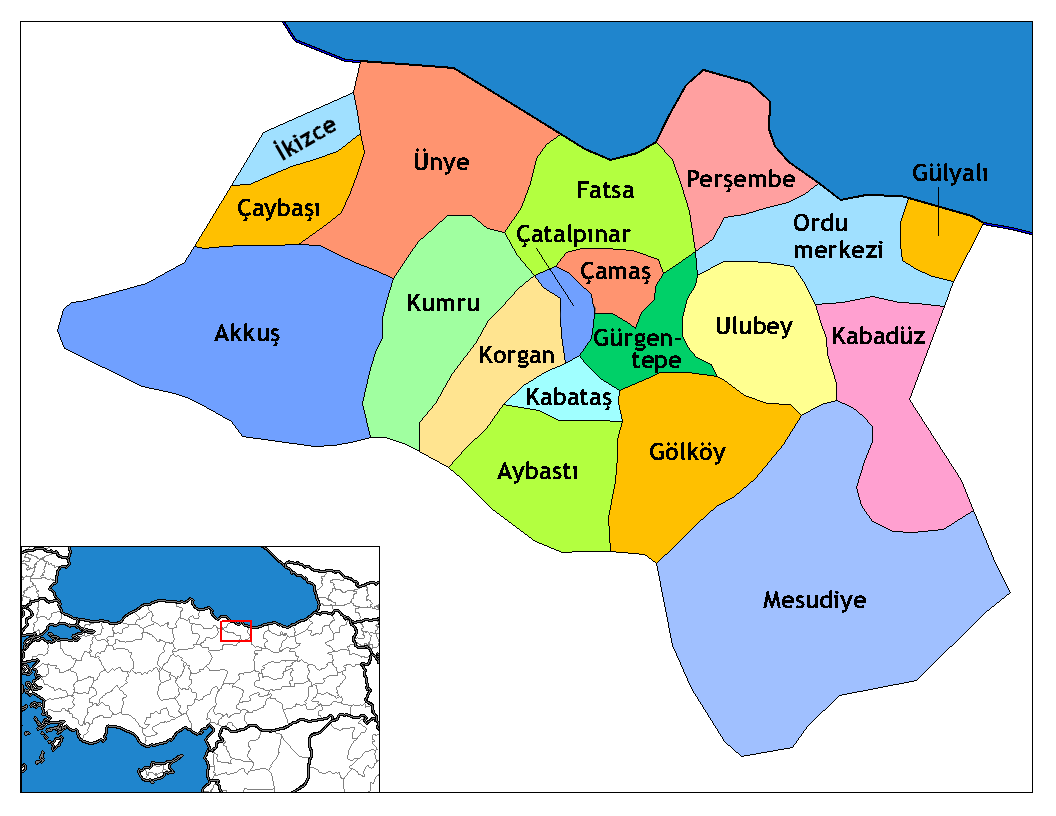
Map of the Province of Ordu, showing the provincial districts.

The Governor of Ordu (Turkish: Ordu Valiliği) is the bureaucratic state official responsible for both national government and state affairs in the Province of Ordu. Similar to the Governors of the 80 other Provinces of Turkey, the Governor of Ordu is appointed by the Government of Turkey and is responsible for the implementation of government legislation within Ordu. The Governor is also the most senior commander of both the Ordu provincial police force and the Ordu Gendarmerie.

== Appointment ==
The Governor of Ordu is appointed by the President of Turkey, who confirms the appointment after recommendation from the Turkish Government. The Ministry of the Interior first considers and puts forward possible candidates for approval by the cabinet. The Governor of Ordu is therefore not a directly elected position and instead functions as the most senior civil servant in the Province of Ordu.

=== Term limits ===
The Governor is not limited by any term limits and does not serve for a set length of time. Instead, the Governor serves at the pleasure of the Government, which can appoint or reposition the Governor whenever it sees fit. Such decisions are again made by the cabinet of Turkey. The Governor of Ordu, as a civil servant, may not have any close connections or prior experience in Ordu Province. It is not unusual for Governors to alternate between several different Provinces during their bureaucratic career.

== Functions ==
The Governor of Ordu has both bureaucratic functions and influence over local government. The main role of the Governor is to oversee the implementation of decisions by government ministries, constitutional requirements and legislation passed by Grand National Assembly within the provincial borders. The Governor also has the power to reassign, remove or appoint officials a certain number of public offices and has the right to alter the role of certain public institutions if they see fit. Governors are also the most senior public official within the Province, meaning that they preside over any public ceremonies or provincial celebrations being held due to a national holiday. As the commander of the provincial police and Gendarmerie forces, the Governor can also take decisions designed to limit civil disobedience and preserve public order. Although mayors of municipalities and councillors are elected during local elections, the Governor has the right to re-organise or to inspect the proceedings of local government despite being an unelected position.

== List of governors of Ordu ==
- Fazıl Özelçi (1923–1924)
- Ahmet Rıfat Vona (1924–1925)
- Hüseyin Hüsnü Çakır (1925–1926)
- Mehmet Rifat Vardar (1926–1927)
- Ali Kemali Aksüt (1928–1930)
- Tahsin Bey (1930–1931)
- Mehmet Nazif Ergin (1931–1933)
- İsmail Adil Güven (1933–1934)
- Ahmet İzzet Bey (1934–1935)
- A. Sefik Evren (1935–1939)
- Bekir Sami Baran (1939–1944)
- Ziya Kasnakoğlu (1944–1945)
- Feyyaz Bosut (1945–1947)
- Kamil Tuncel (1947–1949)
- Ahmet Demir (1949–1950)
- Fevzi Karakülah (1950–1951)
- Ali Rıza Yaradanakul (1951–1952)
- Eşref Ayhan (1952–1954)
- Sait Kemalî Atay (1954–1955)
- Hadi Ömür (1955–1958)
- Sadık Erdem (1958–1960)
- Yakup Yücel (1960)
- Sadi Kâzım Süer (1960–1961)
- Cezmi Kartay (1961–1962)
- Ahmet Sadullah Verel (1962–1964)
- Mehmet Aldan (1964–1966)
- Ali Rıza Yaradanakul (1966–1968)
- Fahri Centel (1968–1970)
- Mustafa Kemal Demirtaş (1970–1972)
- Sabahattin Çakmakoğlu (1972–1975)
- Fikret Turgut Sayın (1975–1978)
- Yılmaz Ergun (1978–1979)
- Kenan Güven (1979–1981)
- Hasan Bamyacı (1981–1984)
- M. İlyas Aksoy (1985–1991)
- Adnan Darendeliler (1991–1992)
- Sami Sönmez (1992–1996)
- Kemal Yazıcıoğlu (1996–2003)
- Ali Kaban (2003–2006)
- Said Vakkas Gözlügöl (2006–2008)
- Ali Kaban (2008–2009)
- Orhan Düzgün (2009–2013)
- Kenan Çiftçi (2013–2014)
- İrfan Balkanlıoğlu (2014–2017)
- Seddar Yavuz (2017–2020)
- Tuncay Sonel (2020–2023)
- Muammer Erol (2023–)

== See also ==
- Governor (Turkey)
- Ordu Province
- Ministry of the Interior (Turkey)
