= 1986 Turkish parliamentary by-elections =

- 28 September 1986

11 of the 400 seats in the Grand National Assembly
- Turnout: 88.27%
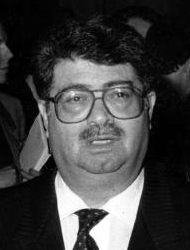

	First party	Second party	Third party
Leader	Turgut Özal	Hüsamettin Cindoruk	Erdal İnönü
Party	ANAP	DYP	SHP
Leader since	20 May 1983	14 May 1985	30 May 1986
Seats won	6	4	1
Popular vote	805,267	590,069	570,055
Percentage	32.12%	23.53%	22.74%
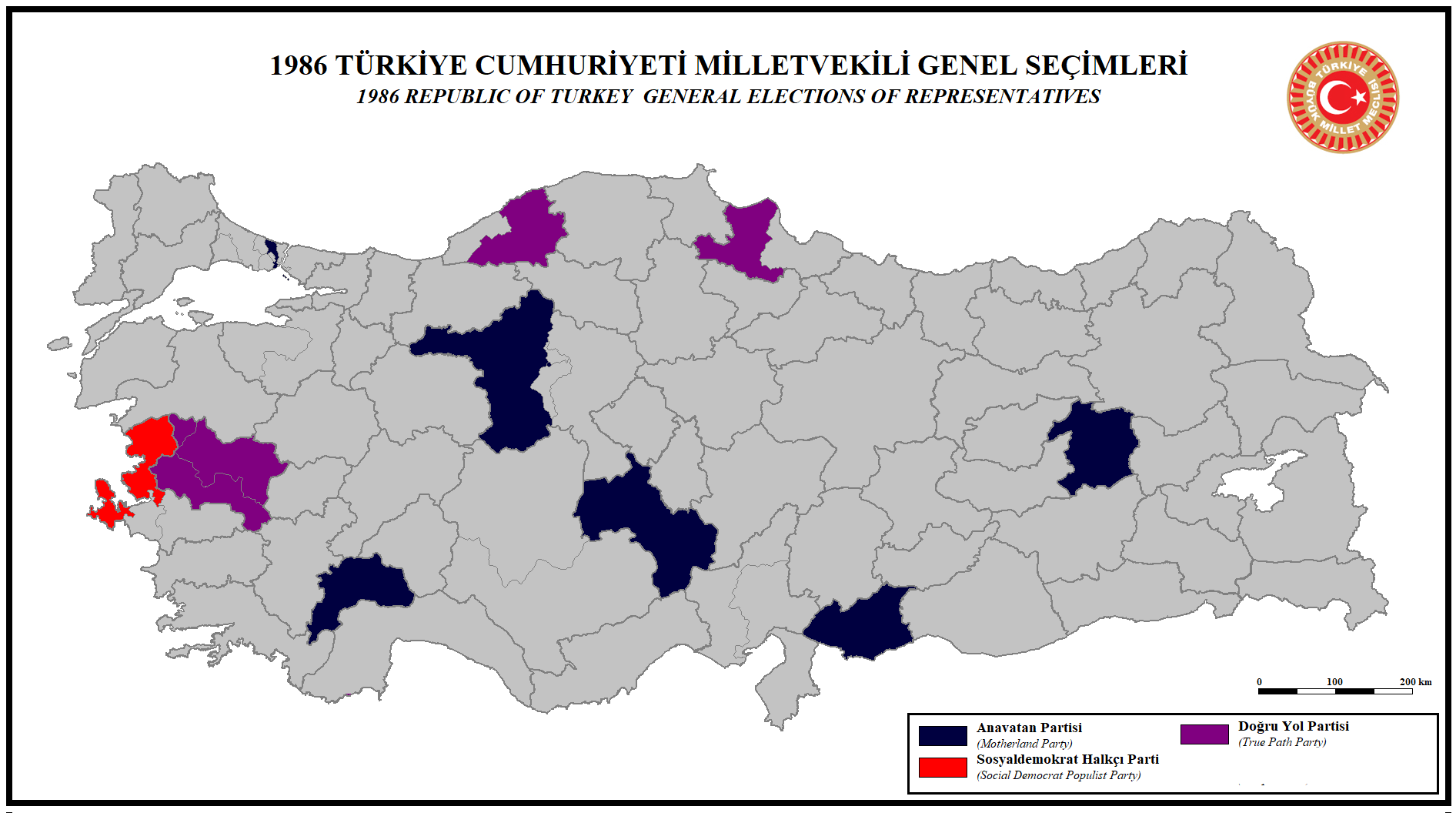
- By-election results by province. Grey provinces indicate no election

The Turkish parliamentary by-elections of 1986 were held on 28 September 1986 in order to elect 11 Members of Parliament to the Grand National Assembly of Turkey. The by-elections were held as a result of the vacation of 11 seats throughout the course of the 17th parliament. They took place in eleven different electoral districts, spanning ten provinces.

The governing Motherland Party (ANAP) won the most votes, winning 32.1% of the vote and 6 of the 11 seats up for election. The newly formed True Path Party (DYP) led by Hüsamettin Cindoruk came second with 23.5% and won 4 seats. Since ANAP and the DYP were both centre-right parties, their campaigns caused a vote split, which resulted in a reduction in the popular vote of the ANAP since the 1983 general election. The Social Democratic Populist Party (SHP) came third with 22.7% and won the remaining seat, with the party's leader Erdal İnönü becoming an MP for İzmir. All provinces elected a single MP apart from Manisa, where two MPs were elected. In addition to İnönü, the leader of the DYP Hüsamettin Cindoruk was also elected as an MP for Zonguldak.

The by-elections were followed by the 1987 general election just over a year later.

== Results ==
Party	Votes	%	Seats
Motherland Party	805,267	32.12	6
True Path Party	590,069	23.53	4
Social Democratic Populist Party	570,055	22.74	1
Democratic Left Party	213,168	8.50	0
Welfare Party	137,485	5.48	0
Nationalist Workers Party	55,144	2.20	0
Free Democratic Party	34,317	1.37	0
Great Nation Party	32,303	1.29	0
Citizen Party	25,814	1.03	0
Reformist Democracy Party	15,729	0.63	0
Great Anatolia Party	13,497	0.54	0
Flag Party	9,058	0.36	0
Independents	5,306	0.21	0
Total	2,507,212	100.00	11
Valid votes	2,507,212	96.70	
Invalid/blank votes	85,540	3.30	
Total votes	2,592,752	100.00	
Registered voters/turnout	2,937,432	88.27	
Source: Samanyolu Haber

=== Members elected ===
Electoral district	Candidate	Party
Ankara	Vahit Melih Halefoğlu	Motherland Party
Bingöl	Mahmut Sönmez	Motherland Party
Burdur	Sait Ekinci	Motherland Party
Gaziantep	Hasan Celal Güzel	Motherland Party
İstanbul	Hüsnü Doğan	Motherland Party
İzmir	Erdal İnönü	Social Democratic Populist Party
Manisa	Ümit Canuyar	True Path Party
Manisa	Sümer Oral	True Path Party
Niğde	Akın Gönen	Motherland Party
Samsun	Hüsamettin Cindoruk	True Path Party
Zonguldak	Köksal Toptan	True Path Party
