= 1984 Turkish local elections =

1984 local elections in Turkey

- 25 March 1984
	Majority party	Minority party	Third party
Leader	Turgut Özal	Erdal Inönü	Yıldırım Avcı
Party	ANAP	SODEP	DYP
Popular vote	7,355,796	4,136,976	2,346,543
Percentage	41.52%	23.35%	13.25%
	Fourth party	Fifth party	Sixth party
Leader	Necdet Calp	Turgut Sunalp	Ahmet Tekdal
Party	HP	MDP	RP
Popular vote	1,552,186	1,255,817	780,342
Percentage	8,76%	7.09%	4.40%
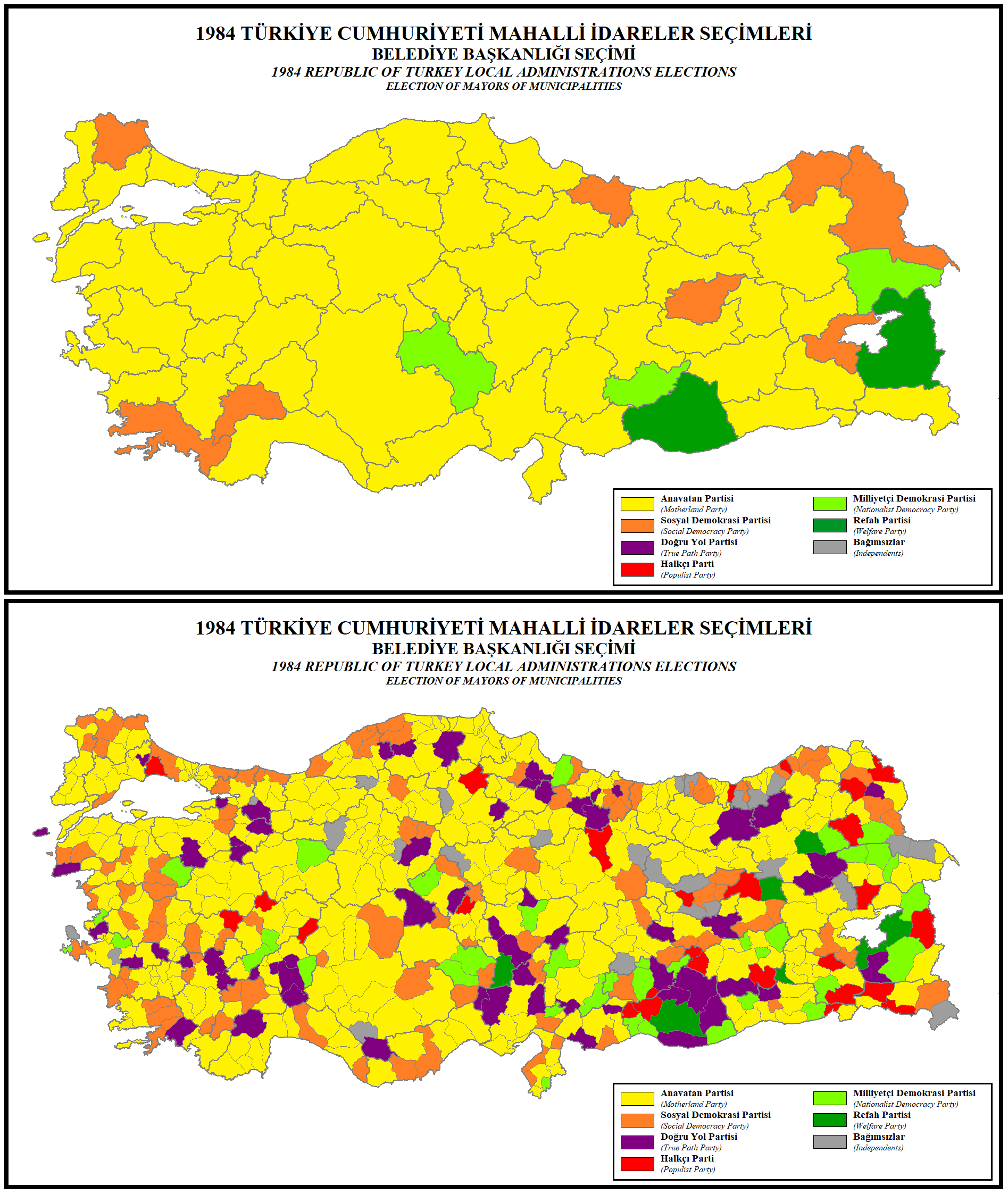

Local elections were held in Turkey on 25 March 1984. In the elections, both the mayors and the local parliaments (Turkish: İl Genel Meclisi) were elected. The figures presented below are the results of the local parliament elections.

== Results ==
=== Provincial assemblies ===
Party	Votes	%
Motherland Party	7,355,796	41.52
Social Democracy Party	4,136,976	23.35
True Path Party	2,346,543	13.25
Populist Party	1,552,186	8.76
Nationalist Democracy Party	1,255,817	7.09
Welfare Party	780,342	4.40
Independents	288,621	1.63
Total	17,716,281	100.00

=== Metropolitan center mayors ===
Metropolitan center	Mayor
Ankara	Mehmet Altınsoy
Istanbul	Bedrettin Dalan
İzmir	Burhan Özfatura

=== Mayor of other centers ===
Province	Party
Adana	ANAP
Adapazarı	ANAP
Adıyaman	MDP
Afyonkarahisar	ANAP
Ağrı	ANAP
Amasya	ANAP
Antalya	ANAP
Artvin	SODEP
Aydın	ANAP
Balıkesir	ANAP
Bilecik	ANAP
Bingöl	ANAP
Bitlis	SODEP
Bolu	ANAP
Burdur	SODEP
Bursa	ANAP

Province	Party
Çanakkale	ANAP
Çankırı	ANAP
Çorum	ANAP
Denizli	ANAP
Diyarbakır	ANAP
Edirne	ANAP
Elazığ	ANAP
Erzincan	ANAP
Erzurum	ANAP
Eskişehir	ANAP
Gaziantep	ANAP
Giresun	ANAP
Gümüşhane	ANAP
Hakkâri	ANAP
Hatay	ANAP
Isparta	ANAP

Province	Party
İzmit	ANAP
Kars	SODEP
Kastamonu	ANAP
Kayseri	ANAP
Kırklareli	SODEP
Kırşehir	ANAP
Konya	ANAP
Kütahya	ANAP
Malatya	ANAP
Manisa	ANAP
Mersin	ANAP
Kahramanmaraş	ANAP
Mardin	ANAP
Muğla	SODEP
Muş	ANAP
Nevşehir	ANAP

Province	Party
Niğde	MDP
Ordu	SODEP
Rize	ANAP
Samsun	ANAP
Siirt	ANAP
Sinop	ANAP
Sivas	ANAP
Tekirdağ	ANAP
Tokat	ANAP
Trabzon	ANAP
Tunceli	SODEP
Şanlıurfa	RP
Uşak	ANAP
Van	RP
Yozgat	ANAP
Zonguldak	ANAP
