= Cezmi Kartay =

Turkish civil servant and politician

- Born: 1920; İzmit, Ottoman Empire
- Died: 10 August 2008 (aged 87–88); İzmit
- Education: Political science
- Alma mater: Faculty of Political Science, Ankara University
- Occupations: Politician, civil servant
- Political party: SODEP; SHP

Cezmi Kartay (1920 – 10 August 2008) was a Turkish civil servant and politician.

== Early life ==
Kartay was born in İzmit. After Haydarpaşa High School, he graduated from the Faculty of Political Sciences of Ankara University. He served as a district governor (Kaymakam) in the districts of Kemaliye, Akyazı, Çermik and Baskil. After 1960, he was appointed as the province governor (Vali) of Malatya, Tekirdağ and Gaziantep Provinces. While serving in Malatya, he was also the acting mayor of the city for four years.

== Kartay and CHP ==
After the coup of 1980, the activities of Republican People's Party (Turkish: Cumhuriyet Halk Partisi (CHP), which is usually credited as the founder of Turkish republic in 1923, were suspended by the military rule so called National Security Council (MGK). But the party was not closed, and Cezmi Kartay was appointed as the trustee of the party. On 16 October 1981 however, the party, like other parties, was closed by the MGK.

== Kartay and SODEP ==
After a year and half, the MGK decided to allow the formation of new parties with severe restrictions. According to instructions, the new parties were not allowed to use the names of the former parties and senior politicians were not allowed to be the charter member of the new parties. Furthermore, the MGK had the power of rejecting the founders. This gave the MGK a privilege to limit the number of parties that would attend the coming parliamentary elections.

One of the new parties was SODEP, which was founded by the followers of ex-CHP. The chairman of the party was Erdal İnönü, an eminent physics professor and also the son of İsmet İnönü, the second president of Turkey. Cezmi Kartay was also a charter member of the party. But when İnönü’s name was rejected by the MGK on 23 June 1983, Cezmi Kartay, whose name was not rejected, was elected as the chairman of the party. Cezmi Kartay’s term was short. On 17 December 1983, following the 1983 general elections, he resigned and Erdal İnönü was reelected as the chairman. Cezmi Kartay continued as a vice chairman.

== Kartay and SHP ==
Two years later SODEP merged with another party to form Social Democrat People's Party (Turkish: Sosyal Demokrat Halkçı Parti). In SHP also, Cezmi Kartay served as a vice chairman for one term. In 1988 he acted as a moderator between Erdal İnönü and Deniz Baykal, the leader of intraparty opposition.

== Later years ==
In later years, he did not participate in active politics. He died on 10 August 2008, in İzmit, and was laid to rest at the Karşıyaka Cemetery following the religious funeral service held at Kocatepe Mosque.

== Works ==
- Memoirs {{in lang|tr}}

Preceded by Erdal İnönü	Chairman of SODEP; 27 June 1983 – 17 December 1983	Succeeded by Erdal İnönü
