= Erdal İnönü =

Turkish politician

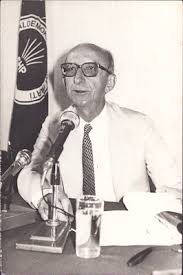

Acting Prime Minister of Turkey
- In office 16 May 1993 – 25 June 1993
- President: Süleyman Demirel
- Preceded by: Süleyman Demirel
- Succeeded by: Tansu Çiller

Minister of Foreign Affairs
- In office 27 March 1995 – 6 October 1995
- Prime Minister: Tansu Çiller
- Preceded by: Murat Karayalçın
- Succeeded by: Ali Coşkun Kırca

Deputy Prime Minister of Turkey
- In office 20 November 1991 – 12 September 1993
- Prime Minister: Süleyman Demirel
- Preceded by: Ekrem Pakdemirli
- Succeeded by: Murat Karayalçın

Leader of the Social Democratic Populist Party
- In office 30 May 1986 – 12 September 1993
- Preceded by: Aydın Güven Gürkan
- Succeeded by: Murat Karayalçın

Leader of the Social Democracy Party
- In office 18 December 1983 – 3 November 1985
- Preceded by: Cezmi Kartay
- Succeeded by: Position abolished
- In office 26 May 1983 – 23 June 1983
- Preceded by: Position established
- Succeeded by: Cezmi Kartay

Member of the Grand National Assembly
- In office 28 September 1986 – 4 December 1995
- Constituency: İzmir (1986, 1987, 1991)

Personal details
- Born: 6 June 1926 Ankara, Turkey
- Died: 31 October 2007 (aged 81) Houston, Texas, US
- Party: Republican People's Party (1995–2001)
- Other political affiliations: Social Democracy Party (1983–1985); Social Democratic Populist Party (1985–1995)
- Spouse: Sevinç İnönü (m. 1957)
- Parents: İsmet İnönü (father); Mevhibe İnönü (mother)
- Education: Ankara University (B.Sc.); California Institute of Technology (Ph.D.)
- Profession: Physicist, politician
- Scientific career
- Fields: Theoretical physics
- Workplaces: Princeton University; Ankara University; Middle East Technical University; Boğaziçi University; Sabancı University
- Thesis: Interpretation of large ionization bursts observed at high altitudes in high pressure chambers under thick shields (1952)
- Doctoral advisor: Robert F. Christy

Erdal İnönü (6 June 1926 – 31 October 2007) was a Turkish theoretical physicist and politician who served as the interim prime minister of Turkey between 16 May and 25 June 1993. He also served as the deputy prime minister of Turkey from 1991 to 1993 and as the minister of foreign affairs from March to October 1995. He served as the leader of the Social Democracy Party (SODEP) from 1983 to 1985 and later the Social Democratic Populist Party (SHP) from 1986 to 1993. He was the son of the second president of Turkey, İsmet İnönü.

İnönü initially founded SODEP in 1983 with the intention of contesting the 1983 general election. However, the National Security Council, which had been established following the 1980 military coup, banned İnönü from standing for office. Standing down as chairman in order to be replaced by a politician that could seek office, İnönü was succeeded by Cezmi Kartay. However, SODEP was banned completely from contesting the election, resulting in İnönü taking over as leader for a second time shortly afterwards.

His party contested the 1984 local elections and came second with 23.4% of the vote. SODEP merged with the People's Party in 1985 and İnönü became the leader of the new Social Democratic Populist Party (SHP) in 1986. In the 1986 parliamentary by-elections, the SHP came third with 22.7% of the vote and İnönü was elected as a member of Parliament for İzmir. He was the only successful SHP candidate.

Following the 1991 general election, the SHP formed a coalition with Süleyman Demirel's True Path Party (DYP) and İnönü became Deputy Prime Minister. He briefly served as the acting prime minister in 1993 after Demirel was elected president. After the DYP elected Tansu Çiller as their leader and she formed a government, İnönü continued as deputy prime minister until he resigned as party leader in 1993. He later served as foreign minister in 1995 until he stepped down as an MP in the 1995 general election.

== Early life ==
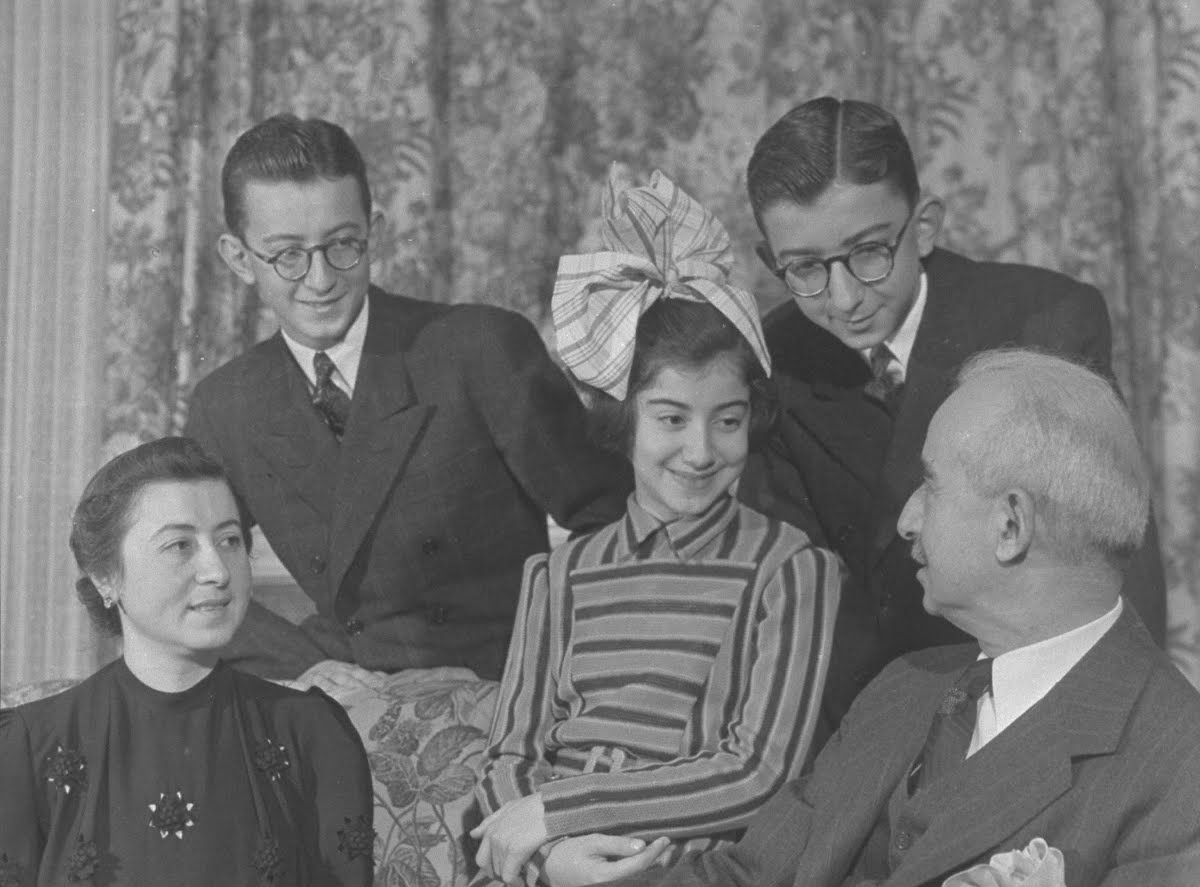
The İnönü family from left to right: Mevhibe, Ömer, Özden (later Toker), Erdal, and İsmet.

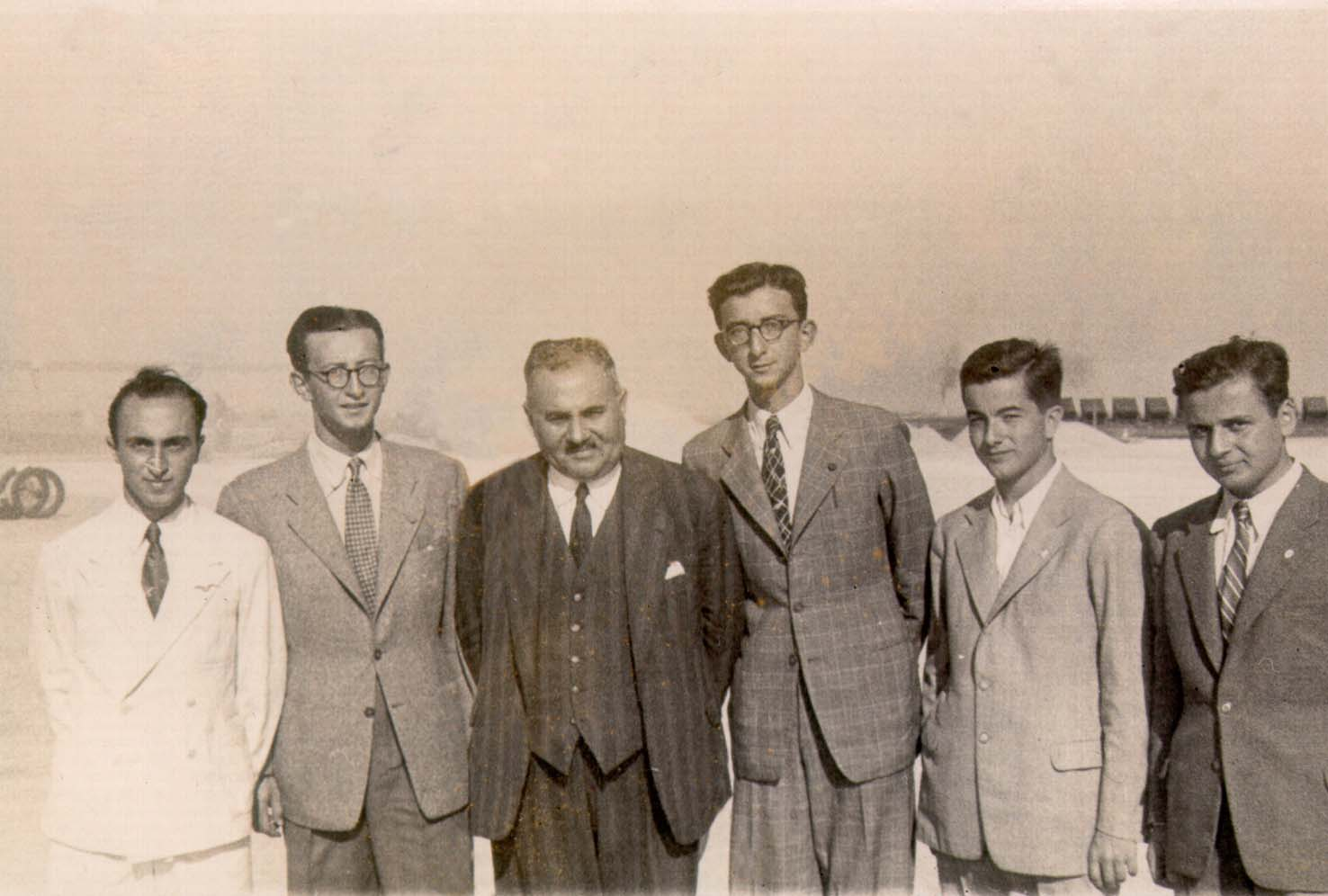
From left to right: Galip Demirağ (son of Nuri Demirağ), Ömer İnönü, Nuri Demirağ, Erdal İnönü, unknown, Mehmet Kum (a student of the School of Engineering), 1941

Erdal İnönü was born in Ankara on June 6, 1926, as the third of four children of İsmet İnönü, the first Prime Minister and second President of Turkey, and Mevhibe İnönü. He graduated from the Physics Department of the Faculty of Sciences of Ankara University in 1947 and received his PhD from California Institute of Technology in 1951; with Eugene Wigner, he pioneered the study of group contractions. Upon his return to Turkey, İnönü worked at first as an assistant professor in Ankara University. Between 1964 and 1974, he was professor of physics and the first chairman of the Department of Theoretical Physics at the Middle East Technical University (1960–1966). He initiated research on neutron transport during that period. Between 1969 and 1971, he was the dean of the university's Faculty of Art and Sciences. He served as president of METU between 1970 and 1971. In 1974, İnönü moved to Boğaziçi University in Istanbul and lectured there until his venture into politics when he founded the Social Democracy Party (SODEP) in 1983. While at Boğaziçi, he served as the dean of the Faculty of Art and Sciences between 1976 and 1982.

== Political career ==
Although the military government banned İnönü's party in 1983 elections, SODEP managed to survive and became the second party in 1984 local elections. In November 1985 SODEP and another party named People's Party (Halkçı Parti) formed a union, the Social Democratic Populist Party (SHP). According to consolidation agreement İnönü briefly lost his post. But he became the leader of SHP in May 1986. SHP was one of the parties which weighed the heaviest in Turkey's political scene during the late 1980s and early 1990s. İnönü challenged the liberal conservative party of Turgut Özal, ANAP, both in 1987 and 1991 elections. One of the main reasons why SHP could not win an election was the division of the moderate left votes between SHP and DSP, the party of the former CHP leader Bülent Ecevit. Erdal İnönü was also a member of the Socialist International. He joined discussions as the deputy chairman of the organization.

Erdal İnönü was deputy prime minister in the two coalition governments formed between center-right DYP and SHP, which were led by Süleyman Demirel at first (from 1991 to 1993) and when Demirel became the president, by Tansu Çiller, in a unity largely caused by their resentment at the time against the outgoing Motherland Party. (See 49th government of Turkey and 50th government of Turkey)

== After resignation ==
In the summer of 1993 he announced that he would not run for the leadership of the party in the coming congress. During the 4th general congress of the party on 11–12 September 1993, he resigned from the leadership of the party and consequently he also resigned from his post in the government. Murat Karayalçın replaced him in both posts. In February 1995, SHP and recently refounded Republican People's Party (CHP) merged. Upon Erdal İnönü's suggestion the new party was named CHP. In CHP Erdal İnönü was given the title of honorary chairman. In 1995 he served as the minister of foreign affairs for about six months.

== Later life ==
İnönü was the 2004 recipient of the Wigner medal, given by the Group Theory and Fundamental Physics Foundation, for his contributions to group contractions. He also contributed to the study of the history of science in the Republic of Turkey and the Ottoman Empire, coauthoring a book on the subject. He lectured at Sabancı University and the Feza Gürsey Institute from 2004 to 2007.

== Death ==
Erdal İnönü died in Houston, Texas, United States, on 31 October 2007, where he was being treated for leukaemia. His body was flown to Turkey and was buried at the Zincirlikuyu Cemetery in Istanbul on 4 November 2007 following a state funeral held before the building of Turkish Grand National Assembly in Ankara the previous day and then an Islamic funeral in the Teşvikiye Mosque in Istanbul.

== See also ==
- Cezmi Kartay
- Necdet Calp
- Aydın Güven Gürkan

Political offices
Preceded by Ekrem Pakdemirli	Deputy Prime Minister of Turkey; 20 November 1991 – 12 September 1993	Succeeded by Murat Karayalçın
Party political offices
Preceded by Murat Karayalçın	Minister of Foreign Affairs of Turkey; 27 March 1995 – 6 October 1995	Succeeded by Ali Coşkun Kırca
Party political offices
Preceded by newly founded	Leader of the Social Democracy Party (SODEP); 26 May 1983 – 27 June 1983	Succeeded by Cezmi Kartay
Preceded by Cezmi Kartay	Leader of the Social Democracy Party (SODEP); 17 December 1983 – 3 November 1985	Succeeded by merged with the People's Party (HP) to form the Social Democratic People's Party (SHP)
Preceded by Aydın Güven Gürkan	Leader of the Social Democratic Populist Party (SHP); 30 May 1986 – 11 September 1993	Succeeded by Murat Karayalçın
Awards
Preceded by Harry Jeannot Lipkin	Recipient of the Wigner Medal; 2004	Succeeded by Susumu Okubo
