= Great Anatolia Party =

Great Anatolia Party Büyük Anadolu Partisi
- Leader: Kemal Bekman
- Founded: March 14, 1986
- Dissolved: November 24, 1992
- Headquarters: Ankara
- Ideology: Centre-right; Opposition to the Motherland Party

The Great Anatolia Party (Turkish: Büyük Anadolu Partisi, abbreviated as BAP and formerly abbreviated as BANAP) was a political party in Turkey.

== Disputes with the Motherland Party ==
The Great Anatolia Party was founded in 1986 as an opposition group to the dominant Motherland Party of Prime Minister Turgut Özal; the founders of the Great Anatolia Party were supporters of the Right Path Party.

Disputes arose quickly between the Great Anatolia Party and the Motherland Party, first about the abbreviation. Initially, the name "Great Anatolia Party" (Büyük Anadolu Partisi) was "BAP", but the party changed it to "BANAP". The cause for the new abbreviation was political: "BANAP" was similar to "ANAP", the abbreviation of the Motherland Party (Anavatan Partisi).

A second dispute concerned the logo of the Great Anatolia Party, because the main elements of the logo were the map of Turkey and the honey bee, just like the Motherland Party's logo.

The Motherland Party protested against these cases and litigated to the Constitutional Court and the Supreme Electoral Council. The Constitutional Court didn't intervene, but the Supreme Electoral Council warned the Great Anatolia Party about the abbreviation and logo issues. After that, the Great Anatolia Party changed its abbreviation from "BANAP" back to "BAP" and created a new logo.

The new logo consisted from a perforated drum and a jaguar leaping through the hole in the drum. These images referred to drummer Asım Ekren, who was the son-in-law of the ANAP leader Turgut Özal, while the jaguar was a reference to his Jaguar car, a gift from businessman Zeki Berberoğlu. The new logo caused the party to acquire a new nickname, "The Party of Drum Driller Jaguar" (Turkish: Davulu Delen Jaguar Partisi).

== 1986 Turkish by-elections ==
In the 1986 Turkish by-elections, the party gained 13,497 votes (0.6% of 2,507,212 total votes) and failed to win a single seat in the Grand National Assembly of Turkey.

== Dissolving process ==
After the 1986 by-elections, the Great Anatolia Party dissolved. The party officially ended with a ruling of dissolution by the Constitutional Court on 24 November 1992.
