= Social Democratic People's Party (Turkey) =

Social Democratic People's Party Sosyaldemokrat Halk Partisi
- Leader: Hüseyin Ergün
- Founder: Murat Karayalçın
- Founded: May 24, 2002
- Dissolved: March 13, 2010
- Split from: New Turkey Party
- Headquarters: Ankara
- Ideology: Social democracy Liberal socialism Secularism
- Political position: Centre-left
- Colors: Red (official); Ruby Red (customary)

The Social Democratic People's Party (Turkish: Sosyaldemokrat Halk Partisi), or SHP, was a Turkish liberal socialist and a social-democratic political party established in 2002 by Murat Karayalçın, former Ankara Metropolitan Mayor (1989–1993) and Foreign Minister (1994–1995).

Following Karayalçın's resignation from the Republican People's Party, a number of social democrats, secular leftists, and liberal socialists came together to establish SDHP. The SDHP had most of its policies in common with the former and short-lived Populist Party with the different abbreviation.

In the 2004 Turkish local elections, the party came forward in an alliance with the pro-Kurdish left-wing Democratic People's Party (similar to the original HP) in the 1991 election) and the radical left Freedom and Solidarity Party. The party leader Murat Karayalçın also became a candidate for his former seat of Ankara Metropolitan Municipality in these elections, However, he lost to the incumbent mayor Melih Gökçek of AK Parti.

The party did not participate in the general election of 2007 to avoid fragmenting the left vote. Until then, the party held two seats in the Grand National Assembly of Turkey, two former deputies having resigned in early August 2006 from the party in, what they claimed, was a show of reaction to the lack of concern by the party management against separatist terrorism. SHP, in Congress of March 13, 2010, Equality and Democracy Party combined with the party's name and date received were mixed.
