= Necdet Calp =

Turkish civil servant and politician

President of the People's Party
- In office 20 May 1983 – 29 June 1985
- Succeeded by: Aydın Güven Gürkan

Turkish Prime Ministry Undersecretary
- In office 23 September 1980 – 11 April 1983
- Preceded by: Turgut Özal
- Succeeded by: Erdoğan Yazıcı

Personal details
- Born: September 7, 1922 Karamürsel, Ottoman Empire
- Died: September 13, 1998 (aged 76) Ankara, Turkey
- Party: People's Party (Turkey) (HP)
- Education: Political science
- Alma mater: Faculty of Political Science, Ankara University
- Occupation: Politician, civil servant

Necdet Calp (September 7, 1922 – September 13, 1998) was a Turkish civil servant and politician.

== Early life ==
He was born in Karamürsel ilçe of Kocaeli Province, Turkey on 7 September 1922. He graduated from the Faculty of Political Science of Ankara University in 1944. He also studied at the London School of Economics. He served as district governor, inspector in the Ministry of Interior as well as province governor of Siirt and İzmir. He also served as executive assistant to İsmet İnönü, then prime minister of Turkey. During the military rule between 1980 and 1983, he was the undersecretary of the prime minister Bülent Ulusu.

== Leader of the opposition ==
On 21 May 1983 together with Avni Güler, Engin Aydın and Turhan Timuçin, he founded People's Party (Turkish: Halkçı Parti, HP) in the course of Republican People's Party (Turkish: Cumhuriyet Halk Partisi, CHP), which was closed by the military rule. He was elected as the chairman of the party. After the main rival SODEP was banned from entering the election, the HP became the only party attractive for ex-CHP voters. Although he was not a well known name, he caused a nationwide excitement in a panel discussion on TV by his reaction to the proposal of privatization of İstanbul Bosphorus Bridge. In the election held on 6 November 1983, the HP received 30.5% of the votes and Necdet Calp, now PM from Ankara Province, became the opposition leader.

== The congress ==
In the local elections held on 21 March 1984, in which SODEP also competed, the HP received 8.8%, which meant a loss of nearly 75% of its votes in less than five months. After learning the results, Calp resigned, but he was soon reelected as the chairman. However, during the reelection period, the opposition group in the party gained strength. On the general congress of the party held on 29 June 1985, he lost his chair to Aydın Güven Gürkan.

== Later years ==
After 1985, he did not participate in politics, and in the 1987 elections, he did not run for a seat in the parliament. On 13 September 1998, he died in Ankara as a result of a heart attack.

Preceded by (newly founded)	Chairman of People's Party (Turkey); 21 May 1983 – 29 June 1985	Succeeded by Aydın Güven Gürkan
