= Murat Karayalçın =

Turkish politician (born 1943)

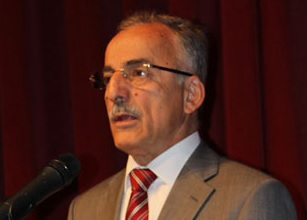

Minister of Foreign Affairs
- In office 12 December 1994 – 27 March 1995
- Prime Minister: Tansu Çiller
- Preceded by: Mümtaz Soysal
- Succeeded by: Erdal Inönü

Deputy Prime Minister
- In office 19 September 1993 – 27 March 1995
- Prime Minister: Tansu Çiller
- Preceded by: Erdal İnönü
- Succeeded by: Hikmet Çetin

Personal details
- Born: 26 October 1943 (age 82) İlkadım, Samsun, Turkey
- Party: SHP (1985); CHP; SHP (2002)
- Education: Ankara University; University of East Anglia
- Profession: Politician

Murat Karayalçın (born 26 October 1943) is a prominent Turkish politician. He is a former foreign minister (1994–1995), deputy prime minister, and a former mayor of Ankara (1989–1993). He is the founder (in 2002) of the new SHP.

Of Hamsheni origin, Karayalçın was educated at Ankara University Faculty of Political Sciences and at the University of East Anglia where he graduated with a master's degree in development economics in 1977. He was elected leader of the SHP on 11 September 1993, succeeding Erdal İnönü and served as the deputy prime minister briefly in the 50th government of Turkey. The party merged with the CHP in 1995.

He was nominated by the CHP as candidate for mayor of Ankara in the 2009 local elections, in which he gained 31.50% of all votes.

In 2002 he founded the new SHP.

== Sources ==
- Karslıoğlu, Yusuf (2009). Doğu Karadeniz tarihi: otokton halkları ve etnik yapısı (in Turkish). Universal Yayınları. ISBN 978-975-01165-1-3.

Political offices
Preceded by Mehmet Altınsoy	Mayor of Ankara; 26 March 1989–19 September 1993	Succeeded by Vedat Aydın
Preceded by Erdal İnönü	Deputy Prime Minister of Turkey; 19 September 1993–27 March 1995	Succeeded by Hikmet Çetin
Preceded by Mümtaz Soysal	Minister of Foreign Affairs of Turkey; 12 December 1994–27 March 1995	Succeeded by Erdal İnönü
Party political offices
Preceded by Erdal İnönü	Leader of the Social Democratic People's Party (SHP); 12 September 1993–18 February 1995	Succeeded by merged with the Republican People's Party (CHP)
Preceded by founded	Leader of the new Social Democratic People Party (SHP); 24 May 2002– 4 November 2008	Succeeded by Hüseyin Ergün
