= Aydın Güven Gürkan =

Turkish politician

Minister of Labor and Social Security
- In office March 27, 1995 – June 3, 1995
- Prime Minister: Tansu Çiller
- Preceded by: Nihad Matkap
- Succeeded by: Ziya Halis

Personal details
- Born: May 10, 1941 Elazığ, Turkey
- Died: January 22, 2006 (aged 64) Istanbul, Turkey
- Party: People's Party (HP); Social Democratic Populist Party (SHP); Republican People's Party (CHP); New Turkey Party (YTP)
- Spouse: Serap Aksoy
- Children: Burcu Gürkan (daughter)
- Education: Political science
- Alma mater: Faculty of Political Science, Ankara University; University of Cologne
- Occupation: Politician, academic

Aydın Güven Gürkan (May 10, 1941 – January 22, 2006) was a Turkish academic and politician.

== Early life ==
Gürkan was born in Elazığ on 10 May 1941. In 1963, he graduated from the Faculty of Political Sciences in Ankara University. In 1970, he completed his doctorate studies in the University of Cologne, Germany with highest honors summa cum laude. Returned to Turkey, in addition to teaching, he served as the dean of Faculty of Journalism in Gazi University. In 1981, he resigned from his post protesting the Council of Higher Education.

== Political career ==
All Turkish parties were closed in 1981 by the military rule so called by the National Security Council (MGK). In 1983, the MGK decided to allow the formation of new parties with severe restrictions. Aydın Güven Gürkan joined People's Party (Turkish: Halkçı Parti, HP)) a new party on the track of Republican People's Party (Turkish: Cumhuriyet Halk Patisi (CHP), which is usually credited as the founder of Turkish Republic in 1923. In the first elections following the military rule, Aydın Güven Gürkan was elected as the deputy from Antalya Province.

== Opposition leader ==
On 1 July 1985, he was elected as the chairman of the party. His party was the main opposition party in the parliament. But by 1985, two other parties on the track of CHP were more popular than HP. He decided to fuse HP with the other parties with similar ideology. Although Bülent Ecevit, the leader of DSP was reluctant, Gürkan and Erdal İnönü, the chairman of SODEP agreed on a merge plan. On 3 November 1985, two parties fused to form Social Democrat Populist Party (Turkish: Sosyal Demokrat Halkçı Parti, SHP) electing Gürkan the chairman of the new party. But in 1986, he was replaced by Erdal İnönü.

== Later years ==
Gürkan served one term as the vice chairman of SHP, and in 1991 he was elected as the deputy from Mersin Province (then known as İçel Province) and served as the Minister of Labour and Social Security during the DYP-SHP coalition government in the 1990s. After SHP-newly established CHP fusion in 1995 however, he became a passive member of the party, and finally resigned from CHP. Except for a brief membership in New Turkey Party in 2002, he did not participate in politics.

== Illness and death ==
Aydın Güven Gürkan died in the morning hours of January 22, 2006 in the intensive care unit of a hospital in Istanbul, where he was delivered shortly before. He had been on treatment for stomach cancer three years long. He had undergone a stomach surgery one and half years before, and was since then on chemotherapy. He had a heart attack one month ago. Gürkan was survived by his wife Serap Aksoy, a theatre and film actress from profession, and his daughter Burcu Gürkan. He was buried in Tuzla Cemetery.

Political offices
Preceded by Nihad Matkap	Minister of Labor and Social Security; March 27, 1995–June 3, 1995	Succeeded by Ziya Halis
Party political offices
Preceded by Necdet Calp	Leader of the People's Party; July 1, 1985- November 3, 1985	Succeeded by merged with SODEP to form Social Democrat People's Party (SHP)
Preceded by formed as a result of fusion	Leader of the Social Democratic Populist Party (SHP); November 3, 1985- May 30, 1986	Succeeded by Erdal İnönü
