= Social Democracy Party (Turkey) =

Defunct political party in Turkey

Social Democracy Party Sosyal Demokrasi Partisi
- Abbreviation: SODEP
- Leader: Erdal İnönü; Cezmi Kartay
- Founded: 6 July 1983
- Dissolved: 3 November 1985
- Merged into: SHP
- Headquarters: Ankara
- Ideology: Social democracy
- Political position: Centre-left
- International affiliation: Socialist International
- Colors: Olive, orange

The Social Democracy Party (Turkish: Sosyal Demokrasi Partisi, SODEP) of Turkey was one of the two main parties of Turkey in early 1980s but later on merged with the People's Party to form the Social Democratic Populist Party (SHP) in 1985.

== Ideology ==
Although SODEP, which existed in Turkish political life for a short period of time, was a centre-left party that wanted to bring together the electorate of the dissolved CHP, its difference from the People's Party was that it focused on adopting and implementing the ideology of social democracy with its universal values, not Kemalist Turkish nationalism and laicism. In this context, SODEP pursued a strategy that aimed at democratising the capitalist system and the bourgeois parliamentary regime as much as possible, social justice reforms in favour of the working classes in income distribution and reforms that expanded the space for freedom in social life.

== History ==
=== Background ===
After the coup of 1980, all political parties were dissolved by the military government (ruling through the National Security Council or Turkish: MGK) regardless of their ideology, on 16 October 1981. For approximately one and half year, there were no political parties. Finally, the MGK decided to allow the formation of new parties with severe restrictions. The new parties were not allowed to use the names of former parties and senior politicians were not allowed to be charter member of the new parties. Furthermore, the MGK had the power of rejecting the charter members. Any party without a certain number of charter members was not allowed to run for the election. (This power was called veto power by the newspapers). This gave MGK the power to limit the number of parties that would stand in the coming parliamentary elections.

=== Formation ===
SODEP was founded on 6 July 1983 by former supporters of the banned Republican People's Party, which is usually credited as the founder of Turkish republic in 1923. There were many newly founded parties, and it proved difficult to reach voters without referring to the names of the former parties and politicians. As such, the party's founders asked Erdal İnönü to be the chairman of the party. İnönü was a physics professor who had never been in politics; however, he was the son of İsmet İnönü, the second president of Turkey. İnönü, who was initially reluctant about the proposition, finally agreed. Some of the other charter members were Türkan Akyol, Oktay Ekşi, Cahit Külebi, Cahit Talas.

=== Elections of 1983 ===
Twenty-one charter members of SODEP, including İnönü, were rejected on 23 June by the MGK. However, the party was not closed and the founders decided to continue with new charter members. The new chairman was Cezmi Kartay whose name had not been rejected. But due to ensuing vetoes, the party was unable to qualify to enter the parliamentary elections (like most of the other parties) which was held on 6 November 1983. In this election, most pre-coup CHP voters cast ballots for the People's Party (Turkish: Halkçı Parti, HP). The HP won 30.5 percent of the vote and became the main opposition party to the victorious ANAP.

=== Elections of 1984 ===
After the 1983 elections, the MGK lost its former veto power, and Erdal İnönü became the chairman of the party for the second time, on 18 December (just 42 days after 1983 elections). SODEP quickly qualified for the next elections, which were the local elections on 21 March. In this election, while SODEP finished second with 23.4 percent of the vote, the HP received only a modest 8.8 percent. It was clear that the choice of ex-CHP voters was SODEP - although the HP was still the main opposition party in parliament.

=== Merger with HP ===
There was a considerable public pressure on both parties to merge. Erdal İnönü and Aydın Güven Gürkan, the new leader of the HP, met and agreed on a plan to merge the parties. On 3 November 1985, SODEP merged with the HP. İnönü agreed to give up his seat during the merger. The new party formed by this merger was named the Social Democrat People's Party (Turkish: Sosyal Demokrat Halkçı Parti) with the abbreviation SHP which resembled that of CHP and a party flag with 6 arrows which resembled that of CHP. The abbreviation SHP should not be confused with the same abbreviation used by the similarly named but distinct Social Democratic People's Party after 2002.

== Memoirs ==
The short and turbulent history of the party was documented both by Erdal İnönü and by Cezmi Kartay.

== See also ==
- Republican People's Party
- SHP
- People's Party (Turkey)
- Erdal İnönü
