= Populist Party (Turkey) =

Former political party of Turkey

Populist Party Halkçı Parti
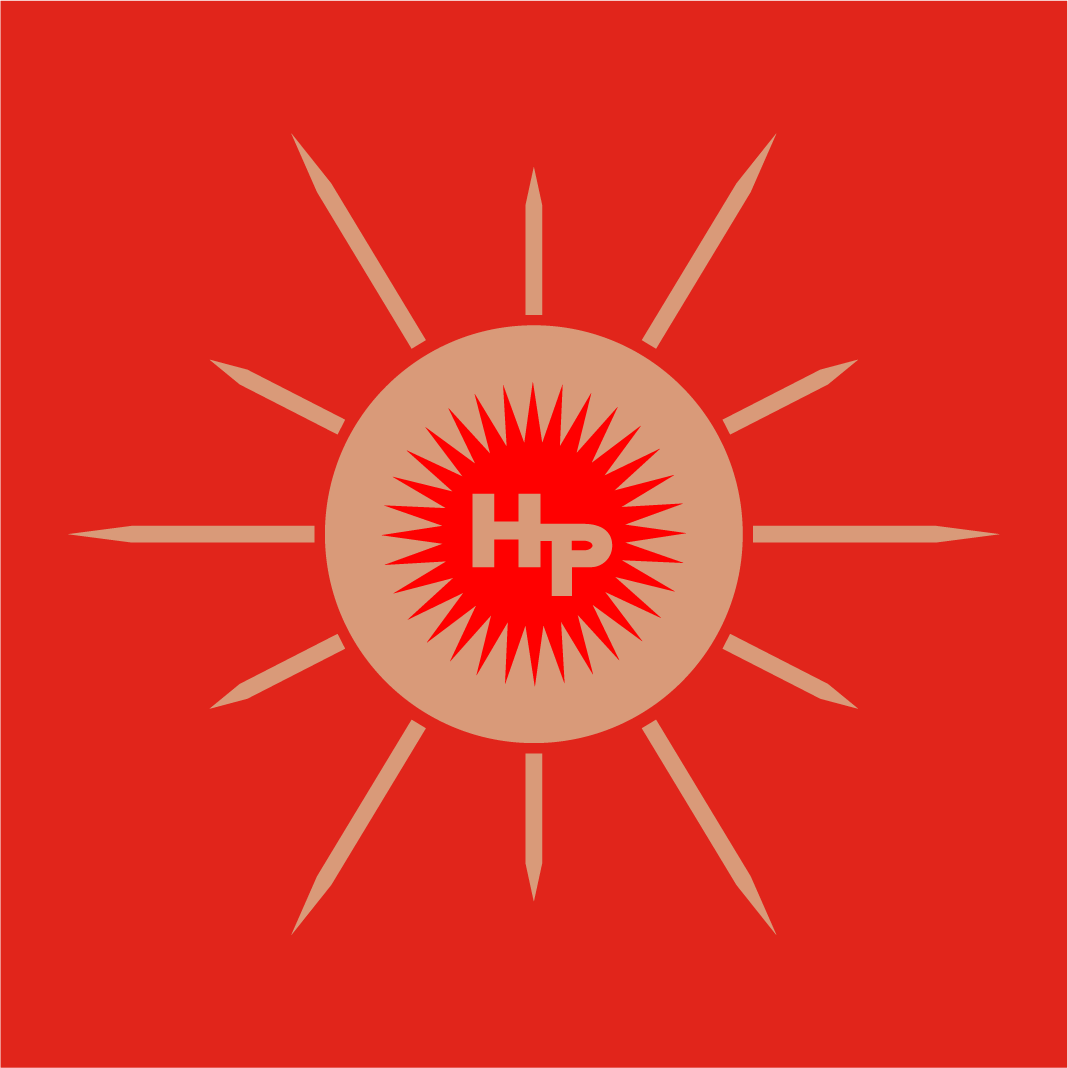
- Abbreviation: HP
- Chairperson: Aydın Güven Gürkan
- General Secretary: Yılmaz Hastürk
- Founder: Necdet Calp
- Founded: 19 May 1983
- Dissolved: 3 November 1985
- Merger of: SODEP
- Split from: CHP
- Merged into: SHP
- Ideology: Social democracy
- Political position: Centre-left
- Colors: Red; Brown

The Populist Party (Turkish: Halkçı Parti, HP) was a political party in Turkey which was active between 1983 and 1985.

== Background ==
After the coup of 1980, all political parties were dissolved by the military government (ruling through the National Security Council or Turkish: MGK) regardless of their political views, on 16 October 1981. In 1983, the MGK decided to allow the formation of new parties with severe restrictions. The new parties were not allowed to use the names of former parties and former politicians were not allowed to be charter member of the new parties.

== Formation ==
One of the parties banned by MGK was the Republican People's Party (Turkish: CHP), the oldest party in Turkey. Supporters of the CHP including Avni Güler, Engin Aydın and Turhan Timuçin founded the People's Party as an intended successor to the CHP on 19 May 1983. The chairman of the party was Necdet Calp, who had once been an executive assistant of late İsmet İnönü, the second president of Turkey. Although he was not a widely known name, he caused nationwide excitement in a panel discussion on TV due to his reaction to the proposal of privatization of the Istanbul Bosphorus Bridge.

== Elections ==
The MGK banned the Social Democracy Party (SODEP), the main rival of the HP for the mantle of the CHP: as the sole heir of the CHP, the HP received 30.5 percent of the vote in the general election of 6 November 1983. The HP became the main opposition party. However this support could not be maintained in the local elections on 21 March 1984 as SODEP was now permitted to stand and the majority of the former CHP votes were redirected to SODEP. The HP had to be content with a 8.8 percent, which meant a loss of nearly 75 percent of its vote in less than five months.

== Merging with SODEP ==
At the party's congress on 27 June 1985, Necdet Calp lost his position as chair to Aydın Güven Gürkan. Gürkan met with Rahşan Ecevit, who was planning to found the DSP party, and Erdal İnönü, the chairman of SODEP, for a possible merger. Although Ecevit was reluctant, İnönü, who had already proposed a merger of all CHP supporters, was an enthusiastic supporter of merging the two parties. On 3 November 1985, SODEP merged with the HP. İnönü agreed to give up his seat during the merger period. The new party formed by this fusion was named the Social Democrat Populist Party (Turkish: Sosyal Demokrat Halkçı Parti) with the abbreviation SHP, which resembled that of CHP and a party flag with six arrows which resembled that of the CHP. The abbreviation SHP should not be confused with the same abbreviation used by the similarly-named but distinct Social Democratic People's Party after 2002.

== See also ==
- Category:Populist Party (Turkey) politicians
- CHP
- SODEP
- List of political parties in Turkey
- Aydın Güven Gürkan (1941–2006)
