= Social Democratic Populist Party (Turkey) =

Defunct political party in Turkey

Social Democratic Populist Party Sosyaldemokrat Halkçı Parti
- Leader: Erdal İnönü
- Founded: 3 November 1985
- Dissolved: 18 February 1995
- Merger of: Populist Party; Social Democracy Party
- Merged into: Republican People's Party
- Headquarters: Ankara, Turkey
- Ideology: Kemalism; Social liberalism Social democracy Secularism; Reformism; Civic nationalism Left-wing populism
- Political position: Centre-left
- International affiliation: Socialist International
- Colors: Red

The Social Democratic Populist Party or Social Democratic Popular Party (Turkish: Sosyaldemokrat Halkçı Parti, abbreviated SHP) is a political party in Turkey that formed after the fusion of the Social Democracy Party of Erdal İnönü and the Populist Party of Aydın Güven Gürkan in 1985.

== History ==
The Social Democracy Party (Sosyal Demokrasi Partisi, SODEP) of Erdal İnönü and the People's Party of Aydın Güven Gürkan were founded in 1983 with the revival of democracy after the military coup of 1980. In 1985, the Social Democracy Party and the People's Party merged to create the Social Democratic Populist Party.

In the 1989 local election, the SHP emerged as the strongest party with 27.8 percent of the vote, winning in six metropolitan areas, 39 provinces, and 283 districts.

The Kurdish question placed the party under serious strain as the MPs Ahmet Türk, Mehmet Ali Eren, Mahmut Alinak, Kenan Sönmez, Ismail Hakki Önal, Adnan Ekmen and Salik Sumer were of Kurdish origin. This was at a time when use of the Kurdish language was forbidden in public and private life. Some of these MPs wanted to take part in the Kurdish Conference in Paris in 1989, to which Chairman İnönü wanted to agree. But after it emerged that representatives of the Kurdistan Workers' Party (PKK) could also take part, participation was forbidden. The seven took part anyway and all were expelled from the party, even though the PKK was not present at the congress and in fact protested against it. As a result, Aydın Güven Gürkan, 12 other MPs of the SHP, dozens of regional party administrators and 3000 party members resigned from the SHP. As a result, People's Labour Party (HEP) was formed in 1990.

Nevertheless the party was one of the first parties to acknowledge that the Kurdish Question was not just an issue of terrorism. In the South Eastern Report published by the party in 1990 the problems of not acknowledging the Kurds as a distinct ethnic group were noticed. It was emphasized the Kurds should be able to express their Kurdish identity and legal barriers prohibiting this should be lifted.

During the 1991 Turkish general election, the SHP formed an electoral alliance with the pro-Kurdish HEP. After the 1991 general election, the SHP became a partner in the coalition government and İnönü became deputy prime minister (11/20). In the coalition agreement, the SHP insisted on lifting the ban on pre-1980 parties which were dissolved by the military government. The pre-1980 parties were authorized on 19 June 1992.

This was risky for the SHP. Shortly after legalization, a group of SHP MPs resigned from the party and reformed the Republican People's Party (CHP), Erdal İnönü's father's party (most party members were pre-1980 CHP members). The SHP and the CHP, two similar parties, co-existed for a while. On 6 June 1993, İnönü announced that he was planning to resign and Murat Karayalçın was elected as the new president of the party on 11 September 1993. Then the CHP and the SHP agreed to merge on 29 January 1995. Former foreign minister Hikmet Çetin (SHP) became the interim chairman and the merged party chose the name of CHP after İnönü's suggestion.

On October 29, a delegation of the SHP went to Yavi to conduct an investigation into the massacre. When the delegation, consisting of SHP parliamentary deputy chairman Kamer Genç, SHP general secretary Halil Çulhaoğlu and Uşak deputy Ural Köklü, approached the coffeehouse, they encountered the attack and verbal protest of the villagers. The vehicles of the SHP delegation, which left Yavi in a short time, were stoned by the villagers. A special team officer saved Kamer Genç from being beaten at the last moment.

== Leaders ==
- 1985-1986 Aydın Güven Gürkan
- 1986-1993 Erdal İnönü
- 1993-1995 Murat Karayalçın
