= 18th Parliament of Turkey =

- 14 December 1987 – 1 September 1991
- MPs: 450

The 18th term of the Grand National Assembly of Turkey lasted from 29 November 1987 to 20 October 1991. There were 450 MPs in the parliament. Motherland Party (ANAP) held the majority. Social Democrat Populist Party (SHP) and True Path Party (DYP) were the other parties.

== Main parliamentary milestones ==
Some of the important events in the history of the parliament are the following:

- 22 December 1987 – Turgut Özal of ANAP formed the 46th government of Turkey
- 10 May 1988 – Civil Code amended; divorcing became easier.
- 25 September 1988 – Referendum on snap election. The governmental proposal was rejected.
- 31 October 1989 – Turgut Özal was elected as the 8th president of Turkey.
- 9 November 1989 – Yıldırım Akbulut of ANAP formed the 47th government of Turkey.
- 7 June 1990 – A group of MPs from SHP resigned from the party and formed People's Labor Party (HEP).
- 23 June 1991 – Mesut Yılmaz of ANAP formed the 48th government of Turkey.
- 20 October 1991 – General election held.

== List of members ==
Constituency	Name	Party
Adana	Ahmet Akgün Albayrak	Motherland Party
Adana	Ledin Barlas	Motherland Party
Adana	Mehmet Ali Bilici	Motherland Party
Adana	Yılmaz Hocaoğlu	Motherland Party
Adana	Ersin Koçak	Motherland Party
Adana	Mehmet Perçin	Motherland Party
Adana	İbrahim Öztürk	Motherland Party
Adana	Mahmut Keçeli	Social Democratic Populist Party
Adana	İbrahim Cüneyt Canver	Social Democratic Populist Party
Adana	Abdullah Sedat Doğan	Social Democratic Populist Party
Adana	Mehmet Can	Social Democratic Populist Party
Adana	Mehmet Selahattin Kılıç	Democrat Party
Adana	Orhan Şendağ	Democrat Party
Adana	Mehmet Halit Dağlı	Democrat Party
Adıyaman	Arif Ağaoğlu	Motherland Party
Adıyaman	Zeynel Aslan	Motherland Party
Adıyaman	Mehmet Deliceoğlu	Motherland Party
Adıyaman	Abdurrahman Karaman	Motherland Party
Afyonkarahisar	Metin Balıbey	Motherland Party
Afyonkarahisar	Baki Durmaz	Democrat Party
Afyonkarahisar	Mustafa Kızıloğlu	Motherland Party
Afyonkarahisar	Hamdi Özsoy	Motherland Party
Afyonkarahisar	Nihat Türker	Motherland Party
Afyonkarahisar	Abdullah Ulutürk	Democrat Party
Ağrı	Hasan Fecri Alpaslan	Motherland Party
Ağrı	Cezmi Erat	Motherland Party
Ağrı	Yaşar Eryılmaz	Motherland Party
Ağrı	Mehmet Yaşar	Motherland Party
Amasya	Hasan Adnan Tutkun	Motherland Party
Amasya	İsmet Özarslan	Motherland Party
Amasya	Mehmet Tahir Köse	Social Democratic Populist Party
Amasya	Kazım Ulusoy	Social Democratic Populist Party
Ankara	Muzaffer Atılgan	Motherland Party
Ankara	Tevfik Ertürk	Motherland Party
Ankara	Göksel Kalaycıoğlu	Motherland Party
Ankara	Onural Şeref Bozkurt	Motherland Party
Ankara	Kamil Tuğrul Coşkunoğlu	Motherland Party
Ankara	Mehmet Çevik	Motherland Party
Ankara	Rıfat Diker	Motherland Party
Ankara	Hüseyin Barlas Doğu	Motherland Party
Ankara	Hazım Kutay	Motherland Party
Ankara	Alpaslan Pehlivanlı	Motherland Party
Ankara	Mehmet Sezai Pekuslu	Motherland Party
Ankara	Mehmet Sağdıç	Motherland Party
Ankara	Halil Şıvgın	Motherland Party
Ankara	Mustafa Rüştü Taşar	Motherland Party
Ankara	Ercan Vuralhan	Motherland Party
Ankara	Zeki Yavuztürk	Motherland Party
Ankara	Battal Karabulut	Motherland Party
Ankara	Eşref Erdem	Social Democratic Populist Party
Ankara	Tevfik Koçak	Social Democratic Populist Party
Ankara	İbrahim Tez	Social Democratic Populist Party
Ankara	Kamil Ateşoğulları	Social Democratic Populist Party
Ankara	Rıza Yılmaz	Social Democratic Populist Party
Ankara	Arif Sağ	Social Democratic Populist Party
Ankara	Erol Ağagil	Social Democratic Populist Party
Ankara	Beşer Baydar	Social Democratic Populist Party
Ankara	Ömer Çiftçi	Social Democratic Populist Party
Ankara	Yaşar Yılmaz	Social Democratic Populist Party
Antalya	Adil Aydın	Democrat Party
Antalya	Zekeriya Bahçeci	Democrat Party
Antalya	Deniz Baykal	Social Democratic Populist Party
Antalya	Hasan Çakır	Motherland Party
Antalya	Abdullah Cengiz Dağyar	Motherland Party
Antalya	İbrahim Demir	Democrat Party
Antalya	Hasan Namal	Democrat Party
Antalya	Cengiz Tuncer	Motherland Party
Artvin	Hasan Ekinci	Democrat Party
Artvin	Bahattin Çaloğlu	Motherland Party
Artvin	Ayhan Arifağaoğlu	Social Democratic Populist Party
Aydın	Cengiz Altınkaya	Motherland Party
Aydın	Mustafa Bozkurt	Motherland Party
Aydın	Ömer Okan Çağlar	Motherland Party
Aydın	Mehmet Özalp	Motherland Party
Aydın	Nabi Sabuncu	Motherland Party
Aydın	Mehmet Yüzügüler	Motherland Party
Aydın	Hilmi Ziya Postacı	Social Democratic Populist Party
Balıkesir	Ahmet Edip Uğur	Motherland Party
Balıkesir	Ali Sami Akkaş	Motherland Party
Balıkesir	İsmail Dayı	Motherland Party
Balıkesir	Kudret Bölükoğlu	Motherland Party
Balıkesir	Mehmet Fenni İslimyeli	Motherland Party
Balıkesir	Necat Tunçsiper	Motherland Party
Balıkesir	Mustafa Tosun Çorapçıoğlu	Motherland Party
Balıkesir	İsmet Önder Kırlı	Social Democratic Populist Party
Bilecik	Mehmet Seven	Motherland Party
Bilecik	Tayfur Ün	Social Democratic Populist Party
Bingöl	Mehmet Ali Doğuşlu	Motherland Party
Bingöl	İlhami Binici	Social Democratic Populist Party
Bingöl	Haydar Baylaz	Democrat Party
Bitlis	Faik Tarımcıoğlu	Motherland Party
Bitlis	Kamran İnan	Motherland Party
Bitlis	Muhyettin Mutlu	Motherland Party
Bolu	Ahmet Şamil Kazokoğlu	Motherland Party
Bolu	Kazım Oksay	Motherland Party
Bolu	Nevzat Durukan	Motherland Party
Bolu	Seçkin Fırat	Motherland Party
Bolu	Turgut Yaşar Gülez	Democrat Party
Burdur	Fethi Çelikbaş	Motherland Party
Burdur	İbrahim Özel	Motherland Party
Burdur	Sait Ekinci	Motherland Party
Bursa	Ahmet Kurtcebe Alptemoçin	Motherland Party
Bursa	Fahir Sabuniş	Motherland Party
Bursa	Hüsamettin Örüç	Motherland Party
Bursa	İlhan Aşkın	Motherland Party
Bursa	İsmet Tavgaç	Motherland Party
Bursa	Mehmet Gedik	Motherland Party
Bursa	Mustafa Ertuğrul Ünlü	Motherland Party
Bursa	Ahmet Fehmi Işıklar	Social Democratic Populist Party
Bursa	Cavit Çağlar	Democrat Party
Bursa	Abdülkadir Cenkçiler	Democrat Party
Bursa	Beytullah Mehmet Gazioğlu	Democrat Party
Çanakkale	Ayhan Uysal	Motherland Party
Çanakkale	İlker Genlik	Motherland Party
Çanakkale	Mustafa Cumhur Ersümer	Motherland Party
Çanakkale	Mümin Kahraman	Motherland Party
Çankırı	Ali Çiftçi	Motherland Party
Çankırı	Ali Necmettin Şeyhoğlu	Motherland Party
Çankırı	İlker Tuncay	Motherland Party
Çorum	Mithat Balak	Motherland Party
Çorum	Mustafa Namlı	Motherland Party
Çorum	Nevzat Aksu	Motherland Party
Çorum	Ünal Akkaya	Motherland Party
Çorum	Cemal Şahin	Social Democratic Populist Party
Çorum	Rıza Ilıman	Social Democratic Populist Party
Denizli	Aycan Çakıroğulları	Motherland Party
Denizli	İsmail Şengün	Motherland Party
Denizli	Muzaffer Arıcı	Motherland Party
Denizli	Adnan Keskin	Social Democratic Populist Party
Denizli	Arif Hüdai Oral	Social Democratic Populist Party
Denizli	Esat Yıldırım Avcı	Democrat Party
Diyarbakır	Abdülkadir Aksu	Motherland Party
Diyarbakır	Mahmut Kepoğlu	Motherland Party
Diyarbakır	Nurettin Dilek	Motherland Party
Diyarbakır	Hikmet Çetin	Social Democratic Populist Party
Diyarbakır	Fuat Atalay	Social Democratic Populist Party
Diyarbakır	Sait Ensarioğlu	Democrat Party
Diyarbakır	Mehmet Kahraman	Social Democratic Populist Party
Diyarbakır	Salih Sümer	Social Democratic Populist Party
Edirne	İsmail Üğdül	Motherland Party
Edirne	Şener İşleten	Motherland Party
Edirne	Erdal Kalkan	Social Democratic Populist Party
Edirne	Mehmet Fuat Erçetin	Social Democratic Populist Party
Elazığ	Hüseyin Cahit Aral	Motherland Party
Elazığ	Nizamettin Özdoğan	Motherland Party
Elazığ	Ahmet Küçükel	Democrat Party
Elazığ	Ali Rıza Septioğlu	Democrat Party
Elazığ	Mehmet Tahir Şaşmaz	Social Democratic Populist Party
Erzincan	Metin Yaman	Motherland Party
Erzincan	Yıldırım Akbulut	Motherland Party
Erzincan	Mustafa Kul	Social Democratic Populist Party
Erzurum	Mehmet Kahraman	Motherland Party
Erzurum	Mustafa Rıfkı Yaylalı	Motherland Party
Erzurum	Nihat Kitapçı	Motherland Party
Erzurum	Rıza Şimşek	Motherland Party
Erzurum	Sabahattin Aras	Motherland Party
Erzurum	Togay Gemalmaz	Motherland Party
Erzurum	İsmail Köse	Democrat Party
Eskişehir	Erol Zeytinoğlu	Motherland Party
Eskişehir	İsmet Oktay	Motherland Party
Eskişehir	Mustafa Balcılar	Motherland Party
Eskişehir	Mehmet Cevdet Selvi	Social Democratic Populist Party
Eskişehir	Zeki Ünal	Social Democratic Populist Party
Gaziantep	Ahmet Günebakan	Motherland Party
Gaziantep	Hasan Celal Güzel	Motherland Party
Gaziantep	Hasan Tanrıöver	Motherland Party
Gaziantep	Mehmet Akdemir	Motherland Party
Gaziantep	Mustafa Hikmet Çelebi	Motherland Party
Gaziantep	Ünal Yaşar	Motherland Party
Gaziantep	Abdülkadir Ateş	Social Democratic Populist Party
Gaziantep	Mustafa Yılmaz	Social Democratic Populist Party
Giresun	Burhan Kara	Motherland Party
Giresun	Mehmet Ali Karadeniz	Motherland Party
Giresun	Yavuz Köymen	Motherland Party
Giresun	Mustafa Çakır	Social Democratic Populist Party
Giresun	Rüştü Kurt	Social Democratic Populist Party
Gümüşhane	Mahmut Oltan Sungurlu	Motherland Party
Gümüşhane	Muhittin Karaman	Motherland Party
Gümüşhane	Ülkü Gökalp Güney	Motherland Party
Hakkâri	Naim Geylani	Motherland Party
Hakkâri	Cumhur Keskin	Social Democratic Populist Party
Hatay	Kamran Karaman	Motherland Party
Hatay	Mehmet Pürdeloğlu	Motherland Party
Hatay	Mehmet Vehbi Dinçerler	Motherland Party
Hatay	Abdullah Öner Miski	Social Democratic Populist Party
Hatay	Ali Uyar	Social Democratic Populist Party
Hatay	Mehmet Dönen	Social Democratic Populist Party
Hatay	Mustafa Kemal Duduoğlu	Social Democratic Populist Party
Hatay	Turhan Hırfanoğlu	Social Democratic Populist Party
Hatay	Mustafa Murat Sökmenoğlu	Democrat Party
Isparta	Süleyman Demirel	Democrat Party
Isparta	İbrahim Gürdal	Democrat Party
Isparta	Ertekin Durutürk	Democrat Party
Isparta	Abdullah Aykon Doğan	Democrat Party
İçel (Mersin)	Ali Er	Motherland Party
İçel (Mersin)	Ali Hüsrev Bozer	Motherland Party
İçel (Mersin)	Ali Rıza Yılmaz	Motherland Party
İçel (Mersin)	Hikmet Biçentürk	Motherland Party
İçel (Mersin)	Rüştü Kazım Yücelen	Motherland Party
İçel (Mersin)	Durmuş Fikri Sağlar	Social Democratic Populist Party
İçel (Mersin)	Ekin Dikmen	Social Democratic Populist Party
İçel (Mersin)	Etem Cankurtaran	Social Democratic Populist Party
İçel (Mersin)	Mustafa İstemihan Talay	Social Democratic Populist Party
İstanbul	Behiç Sadi Abbasoğlu	Motherland Party
İstanbul	Bülent Akarcalı	Motherland Party
İstanbul	Cevdet Akçalı	Motherland Party
İstanbul	Avni Akyol	Motherland Party
İstanbul	Bedrettin Doğancan Akyürek	Motherland Party
İstanbul	Abdülbaki Albayrak	Motherland Party
İstanbul	Yaşar Albayrak	Motherland Party
İstanbul	İmren Aykut	Motherland Party
İstanbul	Abdullah Baştürk	Social Democratic Populist Party
İstanbul	İsmail Cem	Social Democratic Populist Party
İstanbul	Yüksel Çengel	Social Democratic Populist Party
İstanbul	Orhan Demirtaş	Motherland Party
İstanbul	Mehmet Necat Eldem	Motherland Party
İstanbul	Hayrettin Elmas	Motherland Party
İstanbul	Ali Haydar Erdoğan	Social Democratic Populist Party
İstanbul	Mehmet Ali Eren	Social Democratic Populist Party
İstanbul	Halil Orhan Ergüder	Motherland Party
İstanbul	Temel Gündoğdu	Motherland Party
İstanbul	Hasan Fehmi Güneş	Social Democratic Populist Party
İstanbul	İsmail Safa Giray	Motherland Party
İstanbul	Nuri Gökalp	Motherland Party
İstanbul	Talat İçöz	Motherland Party
İstanbul	Ömer Ferruh İlter	Motherland Party
İstanbul	Adnan Kahveci	Motherland Party
İstanbul	Altan Kavak	Motherland Party
İstanbul	Mehmet Cavit Kavak	Motherland Party
İstanbul	Recep Ercüment Konukman	Motherland Party
İstanbul	Aytekin Kotil	Social Democratic Populist Party
İstanbul	Leyla Yeniay Köseoğlu	Motherland Party
İstanbul	Mehmet Moğultay	Social Democratic Populist Party
İstanbul	Hüsnü Okçuoğlu	Social Democratic Populist Party
İstanbul	İsmail Hakkı Önal	Social Democratic Populist Party
İstanbul	Turgut Özal	Motherland Party
İstanbul	İbrahim Özdemir	Motherland Party
İstanbul	Mustafa Hilmi Özen	Motherland Party
İstanbul	Mustafa Sarıgül	Social Democratic Populist Party
İstanbul	Kenan Sönmez	Social Democratic Populist Party
İstanbul	Güneş Taner	Motherland Party
İstanbul	Ali Tanrıyar	Motherland Party
İstanbul	Ali Topuz	Social Democratic Populist Party
İstanbul	Mustafa Timisi	Social Democratic Populist Party
İstanbul	Sudi Neş’e Türel	Motherland Party
İstanbul	Reşit Akif Ülker	Motherland Party
İstanbul	Adnan Yıldız	Motherland Party
İstanbul	Namık Kemal Zeybek	Motherland Party
İzmir	Akın Gönen	Motherland Party
İzmir	Burhan Cahit Gündüz	Motherland Party
İzmir	Hüsnü Doğan	Motherland Party
İzmir	Işılay Saygın	Motherland Party
İzmir	Işın Çelebi	Motherland Party
İzmir	İsmet Kaya Erdem	Motherland Party
İzmir	Kemal Karhan	Motherland Party
İzmir	Ramiz Sevinç	Motherland Party
İzmir	Ahmet Ersin	Social Democratic Populist Party
İzmir	Birgen Keleş	Social Democratic Populist Party
İzmir	Erdal İnönü	Social Democratic Populist Party
İzmir	Erol Güngör	Social Democratic Populist Party
İzmir	Halil Çulhaoğlu	Social Democratic Populist Party
İzmir	Kıvılcım Kemal Anadol	Social Democratic Populist Party
İzmir	Mehmet Turan Bayazıt	Social Democratic Populist Party
İzmir	Neccar Türkcan	Social Democratic Populist Party
İzmir	Türkan Akyol	Social Democratic Populist Party
İzmir	Veli Aksoy	Social Democratic Populist Party
İzmir	Fuat Kılcı	Democrat Party
Kahramanmaraş	Adil Erdem Bayazıt	Motherland Party
Kahramanmaraş	Ali Topçuoğlu	Motherland Party
Kahramanmaraş	Mehmet Onur	Motherland Party
Kahramanmaraş	Ülkü Söylemezoğlu	Motherland Party
Kahramanmaraş	Ahmet Uncu	Democrat Party
Kahramanmaraş	Atilla İmamoğlu	Democrat Party
Kahramanmaraş	Ali Şahin	Social Democratic Populist Party
Kars	İlhan Aküzüm	Motherland Party
Kars	Kerem Güneş	Motherland Party
Kars	Sabri Aras	Motherland Party
Kars	Yasin Bozkurt	Motherland Party
Kars	Mahmut Alınak	Social Democratic Populist Party
Kars	Vedat Altun	Social Democratic Populist Party
Kastamonu	Murat Başesgioğlu	Motherland Party
Kastamonu	Hüseyin Sabri Keskin	Motherland Party
Kastamonu	Nurhan Tekinel	Motherland Party
Kastamonu	Sadettin Ağacık	Motherland Party
Kayseri	Abdulmecit Yağan	Motherland Party
Kayseri	Servet Hacıpaşaoğlu	Motherland Party
Kayseri	Mehmet İrfan Başyazıcıoğlu	Motherland Party
Kayseri	Mehmet Yazar	Motherland Party
Kayseri	Mustafa Şahin	Motherland Party
Kayseri	Nuh Mehmet Kaşıkçı	Motherland Party
Kayseri	Recep Orhan Ergun	Motherland Party
Kayseri	Seyit Halil Özsoy	Motherland Party
Kırklareli	Cemal Özbilen	Motherland Party
Kırklareli	Gürcan Erzin	Social Democratic Populist Party
Kırklareli	İrfan Gürpınar	Social Democratic Populist Party
Kırşehir	Gökhan Maraş	Motherland Party
Kırşehir	Kazım Çağlayan	Motherland Party
Kırşehir	Şevki Göğüsger	Motherland Party
Kocaeli	Abdulhalim Aras	Motherland Party
Kocaeli	Bülent Atasayan	Motherland Party
Kocaeli	Alaettin Kurt	Democrat Party
Kocaeli	Ali Rıza Sirmen	Social Democratic Populist Party
Kocaeli	Erol Köse	Social Democratic Populist Party
Kocaeli	Onur Kumbaracıbaşı	Social Democratic Populist Party
Kocaeli	Ömer Türkçakal	Social Democratic Populist Party
Konya	Abdullah Tenekeci	Motherland Party
Konya	Abdurrahman Bozkır	Motherland Party
Konya	Adil Küçük	Motherland Party
Konya	Ali Pınarbaşı	Motherland Party
Konya	Ali Talip Özdemir	Motherland Party
Konya	Haydar Koyuncu	Motherland Party
Konya	Kadir Demir	Motherland Party
Konya	Mehmet Keçeciler	Motherland Party
Konya	Mehmet Şimşek	Motherland Party
Konya	Mustafa Dinek	Motherland Party
Konya	Saffet Sert	Motherland Party
Konya	Ziya Ercan	Motherland Party
Konya	Ömer Şeker	Democrat Party
Konya	Vefa Tanır	Democrat Party
Kütahya	Mehmet Rauf Ertekin	Motherland Party
Kütahya	Mustafa Kalemli	Motherland Party
Kütahya	Mustafa Uğur Ener	Motherland Party
Kütahya	Hüseyin Cahit Erdemir	Democrat Party
Kütahya	Mehmet Korkmaz	Democrat Party
Malatya	Galip Demirel	Motherland Party
Malatya	Mehmet Bülent Çaparoğlu	Motherland Party
Malatya	Metin Emiroğlu	Motherland Party
Malatya	Talat Zengin	Motherland Party
Malatya	Yusuf Bozkurt Özal	Motherland Party
Malatya	İbrahim Aksoy	Social Democratic Populist Party
Manisa	Ekrem Pakdemirli	Motherland Party
Manisa	Mehmet Gürbüz Şakranlı	Motherland Party
Manisa	Mehmet Yenişehirlioğlu	Motherland Party
Manisa	Münir Fuat Yazıcı	Motherland Party
Manisa	Hasan Zengin	Social Democratic Populist Party
Manisa	Mustafa Erdoğan Yetenç	Social Democratic Populist Party
Manisa	Önol Şakar	Democrat Party
Manisa	Sümer Oral	Democrat Party
Manisa	Ümit Canuyar	Democrat Party
Mardin	Abdulvahap Dizdaroğlu	Motherland Party
Mardin	Beşir Çelebioğlu	Motherland Party
Mardin	Nurettin Yılmaz	Motherland Party
Mardin	Selahattin Dağ	Motherland Party
Mardin	Ahmet Türk	Social Democratic Populist Party
Mardin	Adnan Ekmen	Social Democratic Populist Party
Mardin	Süleyman Çelebi	Democrat Party
Muğla	Ahmet Altıntaş	Motherland Party
Muğla	Süleyman Şükrü Zeybek	Motherland Party
Muğla	Musa Gökbel	Social Democratic Populist Party
Muğla	Tufan Doğu	Social Democratic Populist Party
Muğla	Latif Sakıcı	Democrat Party
Muş	Alaattin Fırat	Motherland Party
Muş	Erkan Kemaloğlu	Motherland Party
Muş	Mehdin Işık	Motherland Party
Muş	Mehmet Emin Seydagil	Motherland Party
Nevşehir	Ali Babaoğlu	Motherland Party
Nevşehir	Cemal Seymen	Social Democratic Populist Party
Nevşehir	Esat Kıratlıoğlu	Democrat Party
Niğde	Birsel Sönmez	Motherland Party
Niğde	Haydar Özalp	Motherland Party
Niğde	Raşit Daldal	Motherland Party
Niğde	Doğan Baran	Democrat Party
Niğde	Mahmut Öztürk	Democrat Party
Ordu	Ertuğrul Özdemir	Motherland Party
Ordu	Gürbüz Yılmaz	Motherland Party
Ordu	İhsan Nuri Topkaya	Motherland Party
Ordu	Mustafa Bahri Kibar	Motherland Party
Ordu	Nabi Poyraz	Motherland Party
Ordu	Şükrü Yürür	Motherland Party
Ordu	Yılmaz Sanioğlu	Motherland Party
Rize	Ahmet Mesut Yılmaz	Motherland Party
Rize	Mustafa Nazikoğlu	Motherland Party
Rize	Mustafa Parlak	Motherland Party
Rize	Şadan Tuzcu	Motherland Party
Sakarya	Ayhan Sakallıoğlu	Motherland Party
Sakarya	Ersin Taranoğlu	Motherland Party
Sakarya	Mümtaz Özkök	Motherland Party
Sakarya	Yalçın Koçak	Motherland Party
Sakarya	Ahmet Neidim	Democrat Party
Sakarya	Mehmet Gölhan	Democrat Party
Samsun	İlyas Aktaş	Motherland Party
Samsun	Kemal Akkaya	Motherland Party
Samsun	Mehmet Akarca	Motherland Party
Samsun	Mehmet Aydın	Motherland Party
Samsun	Ali Eser	Democrat Party
Samsun	Cemal Alişan	Democrat Party
Samsun	Hüseyin Özalp	Democrat Party
Samsun	İrfan Demiralp	Democrat Party
Samsun	Nafiz Kurt	Democrat Party
Siirt	İdris Arıkan	Motherland Party
Siirt	Kemal Birlik	Motherland Party
Siirt	Kudbettin Hamidi	Motherland Party
Siirt	Mehmet Abdurrezak Ceylan	Democrat Party
Siirt	Zeki Çeliker	Democrat Party
Sinop	Hilmi Biçer	Motherland Party
Sinop	Özer Gürbüz	Social Democratic Populist Party
Sinop	Yaşar Topçu	Democrat Party
Sivas	Yılmaz Altuğ	Motherland Party
Sivas	Ömer Günbulut	Motherland Party
Sivas	Ekrem Kangal	Social Democratic Populist Party
Sivas	Mahmut Karabulut	Motherland Party
Sivas	Kaya Opan	Motherland Party
Sivas	Şakir Şeker	Motherland Party
Sivas	Mehmet Mükerrem Taşçıoğlu	Motherland Party
Şanlıurfa	Aziz Bülent Öncel	Motherland Party
Şanlıurfa	Bahri Karakeçili	Motherland Party
Şanlıurfa	Eyyüp Cenap Gülpınar	Motherland Party
Şanlıurfa	Murat Batur	Motherland Party
Şanlıurfa	Mustafa Demir	Motherland Party
Şanlıurfa	Necati Akıncı	Motherland Party
Şanlıurfa	Osman Doğan	Motherland Party
Tekirdağ	Ahmet Karaevli	Motherland Party
Tekirdağ	Ali Rıfkı Atasever	Motherland Party
Tekirdağ	Enis Tütüncü	Social Democratic Populist Party
Tekirdağ	Güneş Gürseler	Social Democratic Populist Party
Tokat	Erkan Yüksel	Motherland Party
Tokat	Mehmet Zeki Uzun	Motherland Party
Tokat	Metin Gürdere	Motherland Party
Tokat	Talat Sargın	Motherland Party
Tokat	Kazım Özev	Social Democratic Populist Party
Tokat	Kenan Süzer	Social Democratic Populist Party
Trabzon	Avni Akkan	Motherland Party
Trabzon	Eyüp Aşık	Motherland Party
Trabzon	Fahrettin Kurt	Motherland Party
Trabzon	Hayrettin Kurbetli	Motherland Party
Trabzon	İbrahim Çebi	Motherland Party
Trabzon	Necmettin Karaduman	Motherland Party
Trabzon	Mehmet Çakıroğlu	Democrat Party
Tunceli	Kamer Genç	Social Democratic Populist Party
Tunceli	Orhan Veli Yıldırım	Social Democratic Populist Party
Uşak	Ahmet Avcı	Motherland Party
Uşak	Mehmet Topaç	Motherland Party
Uşak	Mümtaz Güler	Motherland Party
Van	Hüseyin Aydın Arvasi	Motherland Party
Van	İhsan Bedirhanoğlu	Motherland Party
Van	Muslih Görentaş	Motherland Party
Van	Reşit Çelik	Motherland Party
Van	Selahattin Mumcuoğlu	Motherland Party
Yozgat	Ali Şakir Ergin	Motherland Party
Yozgat	Cemil Çiçek	Motherland Party
Yozgat	Lütfullah Kayalar	Motherland Party
Yozgat	Mahmut Orhon	Motherland Party
Yozgat	Seyit Ahmet Dalkıran	Motherland Party
Zonguldak	Hasan Pertev Aşçıoğlu	Motherland Party
Zonguldak	Mustafa Tınaz Titiz	Motherland Party
Zonguldak	Ömer Faruk Maçun	Motherland Party
Zonguldak	Veysel Atasoy	Motherland Party
Zonguldak	Güneş Müftüoğlu	Democrat Party
Zonguldak	Köksal Toptan	Democrat Party
Zonguldak	Ömer Barutçu	Democrat Party
Zonguldak	Şinasi Altıner	Democrat Party
Zonguldak	Tevfik Ertüzün	Democrat Party

Preceded by 17th Parliament of Turkey	18th Parliament of Turkey; Yıldırım Akbulut; Kaya Erdem; 19 November 1987 – 20 October 1991	Succeeded by 19th Parliament of Turkey
