= 19th Parliament of Turkey =

- 14 November 1991 – 4 December 1995
- MPs: 550
- Election: October 1991

The 19th Grand National Assembly of Turkey existed from November 6, 1991, to December 24, 1995, with most members having been elected in the 1991 election. The True Path Party of Süleyman Demirel gained a majority of seats in the Assembly, being followed by the Motherland Party, the Social Democratic Populist Party, the Welfare Party, and the Democratic Left Party in decreasing order.

== Incidents ==
On 2 March 1994, Parliament lifted the immunity of Hatip Dicle, an MP from (and chairperson of) the Democracy Party who was among those cross-endorsed by and caucusing with the SHP, and on the same day he was arrested. On 8 December 1994 he was convicted, with Leyla Zana, Orhan Doğan and Selim Sadak, of membership in an organization (PKK) and sentenced to 15 years in prison.

== Officers ==
- Prime Minister: Süleyman Demirel (up to 25 June 1993) - Tansu Çiller (from 25 June 1993)
- Leader of the Opposition: Mesut Yılmaz
- Speaker: Hüsamettin Cindoruk

== Members ==
Constituency	Name	Party
Adana	Uğur Aksöz	Democrat Party
Adana	Bekir Sami Daçe	Democrat Party
Adana	Mehmet Halit Dağlı	Democrat Party
Adana	Veli Andaç Durak	Democrat Party
Adana	Mehmet Selahattin Kılıç	Democrat Party
Adana	Mustafa Küpeli	Democrat Party
Adana	Ali Yalçın Öğütcan	Democrat Party
Adana	Ahmet Şanal	Democrat Party
Adana	Orhan Şendağ	Democrat Party
Adana	Turgut Tekin	Democrat Party
Adana	Yılmaz Hocaoğlu	Motherland Party
Adana	İbrahim Özdiş	Social Democratic Populist Party
Adana	Timuçin Savaş	Social Democratic Populist Party
Adana	Muhammet Kaymak	Social Democratic Populist Party
Adıyaman	Mahmut Kılınç	Social Democratic Populist Party
Adıyaman	Celal Kürkoğlu	Social Democratic Populist Party
Adıyaman	Kemal Tabak	Social Democratic Populist Party
Adıyaman	Abuzer Tanrıverdi	Social Democratic Populist Party
Afyonkarahisar	İsmet Attila	Democrat Party
Afyonkarahisar	Baki Durmaz	Democrat Party
Afyonkarahisar	Ethem Kelekçi	Democrat Party
Afyonkarahisar	Abdullah Ulutürk	Democrat Party
Afyonkarahisar	Halil İbrahim Özsoy	Motherland Party
Afyonkarahisar	Gaffar Yakın	Motherland Party
Ağrı	Mikail Aydemir	Democrat Party
Ağrı	Cemil Erhan	Democrat Party
Ağrı	Hasan Fecri Alpaslan	Motherland Party
Ağrı	Yaşar Eryılmaz	Motherland Party
Aksaray	Halil Demir	Democrat Party
Aksaray	Mahmut Öztürk	Democrat Party
Aksaray	İsmet Gür	Welfare Party
Amasya	Cemalettin Gürbüz	Social Democratic Populist Party
Amasya	Mehmet Tahir Köse	Social Democratic Populist Party
Amasya	Haydar Oymak	Social Democratic Populist Party
Ankara	Bilal Güngör	Democrat Party
Ankara	Orhan Kilercioğlu	Democrat Party
Ankara	İrfan Köksalan	Democrat Party
Ankara	Sait Kemal Mimaroğlu	Democrat Party
Ankara	Mustafa Tınaz Titiz	Democrat Party
Ankara	Baki Tuğ	Democrat Party
Ankara	Mustafa Dursun Yangın	Democrat Party
Ankara	Halil Şıvgın	Motherland Party
Ankara	Vehbi Dinçerler	Motherland Party
Ankara	Mehmet Budak	Motherland Party
Ankara	Mehmet Çevik	Motherland Party
Ankara	Hamdi Eriş	Motherland Party
Ankara	Mehmet Sağdıç	Motherland Party
Ankara	Yücel Seçkiner	Motherland Party
Ankara	Mümtaz Soysal	Social Democratic Populist Party
Ankara	Mehmet Seyfi Oktay	Social Democratic Populist Party
Ankara	Ali Dinçer	Social Democratic Populist Party
Ankara	Uluç Gürkan	Social Democratic Populist Party
Ankara	Salman Kaya	Social Democratic Populist Party
Ankara	Mehmet Kerimoğlu	Social Democratic Populist Party
Ankara	İbrahim Tez	Social Democratic Populist Party
Ankara	Melih Gökçek	Welfare Party
Ankara	Ömer Faruk Ekinci	Welfare Party
Antalya	Veysel Atasoy	Democrat Party
Antalya	Adil Aydın	Democrat Party
Antalya	Hayri Doğan	Democrat Party
Antalya	Gökberk Ergenekon	Democrat Party
Antalya	Ali Karataş	Democrat Party
Antalya	Hasan Namal	Democrat Party
Antalya	Hasan Çakır	Motherland Party
Antalya	Deniz Baykal	Social Democratic Populist Party
Antalya	Faik Altun	Social Democratic Populist Party
Artvin	Hasan Ekinci	Democrat Party
Artvin	Süleyman Hatinoğlu	Motherland Party
Aydın	Tunç Bilget	Democrat Party
Aydın	Ali Rıza Gönül	Democrat Party
Aydın	Nahit Menteşe	Democrat Party
Aydın	İsmet Sezgin	Democrat Party
Aydın	Cengiz Altınkaya	Motherland Party
Aydın	Yüksel Yalova	Motherland Party
Balıkesir	Abdülbaki Ataç	Democrat Party
Balıkesir	Hüseyin Balyalı	Democrat Party
Balıkesir	Ekrem Ceyhun	Democrat Party
Balıkesir	Ömer Lütfi Coşkun	Democrat Party
Balıkesir	Melih Pabuçcuoğlu	Democrat Party
Balıkesir	Sami Sözat	Democrat Party
Balıkesir	Mehmet Cemal Öztaylan	Democrat Party
Bartın	Köksal Toptan	Democrat Party
Bartın	Hasan Akyol	Democratic Left Party
Batman	Mehmet Adnan Ekmen	Social Democratic Populist Party
Batman	Nizamettin Toğuç	Social Democratic Populist Party
Batman	Abdülkerim Zilan	Social Democratic Populist Party
Bayburt	Ülkü Gökalp Güney	Motherland Party
Bayburt	Bahattin Elçi	Welfare Party
Bilecik	Mehmet Seven	Motherland Party
Bilecik	Bahattin Şeker	Democrat Party
Bingöl	Haydar Baylaz	Democrat Party
Bingöl	Kazım Ataoğlu	Welfare Party
Bingöl	Hüsamettin Korkutata	Welfare Party
Bitlis	Kamran İnan	Motherland Party
Bitlis	Edip Safder Gaydalı	Motherland Party
Bitlis	Zeki Ergezen	Welfare Party
Bolu	Nazmi Çiloğlu	Democrat Party
Bolu	Necmi Hoşver	Democrat Party
Bolu	Tevfik Türesin	Democrat Party
Bolu	Avni Akyol	Motherland Party
Bolu	Abbas İnceyan	Motherland Party
Burdur	Ahmet Sayın	Democrat Party
Burdur	Ahmet Şeref Erdem	Democrat Party
Burdur	Mustafa Çiloğlu	Democrat Party
Bursa	Cavit Çağlar	Democrat Party
Bursa	Turhan Tayan	Democrat Party
Bursa	Mehmet Gazioğlu	Democrat Party
Bursa	Fethi Akkoç	Democrat Party
Bursa	İbrahim Gürdal	Democrat Party
Bursa	Kadri Güçlü	Democrat Party
Bursa	Şükrü Erdem	Democrat Party
Bursa	Yılmaz Ovalı	Democrat Party
Bursa	Feridun Pehlivan	Motherland Party
Bursa	Hüsamettin Örüç	Motherland Party
Bursa	Mehmet Gedik	Motherland Party
Bursa	Mümin Gençoğlu	Motherland Party
Çanakkale	Ahmet Hamdi Üçpınarlar	Democrat Party
Çanakkale	Nevfel Şahin	Democrat Party
Çanakkale	Rahmi Özer	Democrat Party
Çanakkale	Süleyman Ayhan	Democrat Party
Çankırı	Nevzat Ayaz	Democrat Party
Çankırı	İlker Tuncay	Motherland Party
Çankırı	İsmail Coşar	Welfare Party
Çorum	Aslan Adnan Türkoğlu	Democrat Party
Çorum	Ateş Amiklioğlu	Motherland Party
Çorum	Cemal Şahin	Social Democratic Populist Party
Çorum	Muharrem Şemsek	Welfare Party
Çorum	Yasin Hatiboğlu	Welfare Party
Denizli	Mehmet Gözlükaya	Democrat Party
Denizli	Mustafa Haluk Müftüler	Democrat Party
Denizli	Nabi Sabuncu	Democrat Party
Denizli	Muzaffer Arıcı	Motherland Party
Denizli	Hasan Korkmazcan	Motherland Party
Denizli	Adnan Keskin	Social Democratic Populist Party
Diyarbakır	Salim Ensarioğlu	Democrat Party
Diyarbakır	Hatip Dicle	Social Democratic Populist Party
Diyarbakır	Leyla Zana	Social Democratic Populist Party
Diyarbakır	Ahmet Fehmi Işıklar	Social Democratic Populist Party
Diyarbakır	Mehmet Kahraman	Social Democratic Populist Party
Diyarbakır	Salih Sümer	Social Democratic Populist Party
Diyarbakır	Mahmut Uyanık	Social Democratic Populist Party
Diyarbakır	Sedat Yurtdaş	Social Democratic Populist Party
Edirne	Evren Bulut	Democrat Party
Edirne	Şerif Ercan	Democrat Party
Edirne	Erdal Kesebir	Democratic Left Party
Edirne	Hasan Basri Eler	Democratic Left Party
Elazığ	Ahmet Küçükel	Democrat Party
Elazığ	Ali Rıza Septioğlu	Democrat Party
Elazığ	Ahmet Cemil Tunç	Welfare Party
Elazığ	Tuncay Şekercioğlu	Welfare Party
Erzincan	Yıldırım Akbulut	Motherland Party
Erzincan	Ali İbrahim Tutu	Social Democratic Populist Party
Erzincan	Mustafa Kul	Social Democratic Populist Party
Erzurum	İsmail Köse	Democrat Party
Erzurum	Abdülmelik Fırat	Democrat Party
Erzurum	Abdulilah Fırat	Welfare Party
Erzurum	Lütfü Esengün	Welfare Party
Erzurum	Oktay Öztürk	Welfare Party
Erzurum	Rıza Müftüoğlu	Welfare Party
Erzurum	Şinasi Yavuz	Welfare Party
Eskişehir	Hüsamettin Cindoruk	Democrat Party
Eskişehir	İbrahim Yaşar Dedelek	Democrat Party
Eskişehir	Muammer Fevzi Yalçın	Democrat Party
Eskişehir	Hüseyin Aksoy	Motherland Party
Eskişehir	Mustafa Balcılar	Motherland Party
Gaziantep	Ayvaz Gökdemir	Democrat Party
Gaziantep	Hannan Özüberk	Democrat Party
Gaziantep	Mehmet Batallı	Democrat Party
Gaziantep	Mehmet Özkaya	Democrat Party
Gaziantep	Abdülkadir Ateş	Social Democratic Populist Party
Gaziantep	Bahattin Alagöz	Social Democratic Populist Party
Gaziantep	Hikmet Çetin	Social Democratic Populist Party
Gaziantep	Mustafa Doğan	Social Democratic Populist Party
Gaziantep	Mustafa Yılmaz	Social Democratic Populist Party
Giresun	Burhan Kara	Motherland Party
Giresun	Rasim Zaimoğlu	Motherland Party
Giresun	Yavuz Köymen	Motherland Party
Giresun	Ergun Özdemir	Democrat Party
Gümüşhane	Mahmut Oltan Sungurlu	Motherland Party
Gümüşhane	Lütfi Doğan	Welfare Party
Hakkâri	Mustafa Zeydan	Democrat Party
Hakkâri	Esat Canan	Motherland Party
Hatay	Abdullah Kınalı	Democrat Party
Hatay	Bestami Teke	Democrat Party
Hatay	Nurettin Tokdemir	Democrat Party
Hatay	Ali Uyar	Social Democratic Populist Party
Hatay	Fuat Çay	Social Democratic Populist Party
Hatay	Mehmet Dönen	Social Democratic Populist Party
Hatay	Nihad Matkap	Social Democratic Populist Party
Hatay	Onur Kumbaracıbaşı	Social Democratic Populist Party
Isparta	Süleyman Demirel	Democrat Party
Isparta	Ertekin Durutürk	Democrat Party
Isparta	Mustafa Fikri Çobaner	Democrat Party
Isparta	Aykon Doğan	Democrat Party
İçel (Mersin)	Ahmet Bilyeli	Democrat Party
İçel (Mersin)	Ali Su	Democrat Party
İçel (Mersin)	Asım Kaleli	Democrat Party
İçel (Mersin)	Yusuf Fevzi Arıcı	Democrat Party
İçel (Mersin)	Rüştü Kazım Yücelen	Motherland Party
İçel (Mersin)	Ali Er	Motherland Party
İçel (Mersin)	Aydın Güven Gürkan	Social Democratic Populist Party
İçel (Mersin)	Fikri Sağlar	Social Democratic Populist Party
İçel (Mersin)	Mustafa İstemihan Talay	Social Democratic Populist Party
İstanbul	Tansu Çiller	Democrat Party
İstanbul	Bedrettin Dalan	Democrat Party
İstanbul	Coşkun Kırca	Democrat Party
İstanbul	Yıldırım Aktuna	Democrat Party
İstanbul	Bedrettin Doğancan Akyürek	Democrat Party
İstanbul	Bülent Akarcalı	Motherland Party
İstanbul	İmren Aykut	Motherland Party
İstanbul	Osman Ceylan	Motherland Party
İstanbul	Kadir Ramazan Coşkun	Motherland Party
İstanbul	Gurhan Çelebican	Motherland Party
İstanbul	Hüsnü Doğan	Motherland Party
İstanbul	Halit Dumankaya	Motherland Party
İstanbul	Kemal Naci Ekşi	Motherland Party
İstanbul	Elaattin Elmas	Motherland Party
İstanbul	Halil Orhan Ergüder	Motherland Party
İstanbul	Salih Ergün	Motherland Party
İstanbul	Safa Giray	Motherland Party
İstanbul	Temel Gündoğdu	Motherland Party
İstanbul	Engin Güner	Motherland Party
İstanbul	Melike Tugay Hasefe	Motherland Party
İstanbul	Fevzi İşbaşaran	Motherland Party
İstanbul	Adnan Kahveci	Motherland Party
İstanbul	Mehmet Cavit Kavak	Motherland Party
İstanbul	Recep Ercüment Konukman	Motherland Party
İstanbul	Cem Kozlu	Motherland Party
İstanbul	Leyla Yeniay Köseoğlu	Motherland Party
İstanbul	Emin Kul	Motherland Party
İstanbul	Ziyaeddin Selçuk Maruflu	Motherland Party
İstanbul	Yusuf Namoğlu	Motherland Party
İstanbul	İbrahim Özdemir	Motherland Party
İstanbul	Sabri Öztürk	Motherland Party
İstanbul	Yusuf Pamuk	Motherland Party
İstanbul	İsmail Sancak	Motherland Party
İstanbul	Gürol Soylu	Motherland Party
İstanbul	Güneş Taner	Motherland Party
İstanbul	Tunca Toskay	Motherland Party
İstanbul	Şadan Tuzcu	Motherland Party
İstanbul	Bahattin Yücel	Motherland Party
İstanbul	İsmail Cem	Social Democratic Populist Party
İstanbul	İbrahim Gürsoy	Social Democratic Populist Party
İstanbul	Algan Hacaloğlu	Social Democratic Populist Party
İstanbul	Mehmet Moğultay	Social Democratic Populist Party
İstanbul	Ercan Karakaş	Social Democratic Populist Party
İstanbul	Mukadder Başeğmez	Welfare Party
İstanbul	Mustafa Baş	Welfare Party
İstanbul	Hasan Mezarcı	Welfare Party
İstanbul	Ali Oğuz	Welfare Party
İstanbul	Hüsamettin Özkan	Democratic Left Party
İstanbul	Mehmet Sevigen	Democratic Left Party
İstanbul	İbrahim Nami Çağan	Democratic Left Party
İzmir	Yıldırım Avcı	Democrat Party
İzmir	Rifat Serdaroğlu	Democrat Party
İzmir	Mehmet Köstepen	Democrat Party
İzmir	Mehmet Özkan	Democrat Party
İzmir	Ersin Faralyalı	Democrat Party
İzmir	Erkut Şenbaş	Democrat Party
İzmir	Nevzat Çobanoğlu	Democrat Party
İzmir	Kaya Erdem	Motherland Party
İzmir	Işın Çelebi	Motherland Party
İzmir	Cengiz Bulut	Motherland Party
İzmir	Işılay Saygın	Motherland Party
İzmir	Timur Demir	Motherland Party
İzmir	İlhan Kaya	Motherland Party
İzmir	Suha Tanık	Motherland Party
İzmir	Cemal Tercan	Motherland Party
İzmir	Erdal İnönü	Social Democratic Populist Party
İzmir	Veli Aksoy	Social Democratic Populist Party
İzmir	Halil Çulhaoğlu	Social Democratic Populist Party
İzmir	Atilla Mutman	Social Democratic Populist Party
Kahramanmaraş	Selahattin Karademir	Democrat Party
Kahramanmaraş	Esat Bütün	Welfare Party
Kahramanmaraş	Hasan Dikici	Welfare Party
Kahramanmaraş	Ahmet Dökülmez	Welfare Party
Kahramanmaraş	Recep Kırış	Welfare Party
Kahramanmaraş	Ökkeş Şendiller	Welfare Party
Kahramanmaraş	Saffet Topaktaş	Welfare Party
Karaman	Seyit Osman Sevimli	Welfare Party
Karaman	Zeki Ünal	Welfare Party
Kars	Abdülkerim Doğru	Democrat Party
Kars	Mehmet Sabri Güner	Democrat Party
Kars	Atilla Hun	Social Democratic Populist Party
Kars	Mehmet Alp	Social Democratic Populist Party
Kars	Zeki Nacitarhan	Social Democratic Populist Party
Kastamonu	Münif İslamoğlu	Democrat Party
Kastamonu	Nurhan Tekinel	Democrat Party
Kastamonu	Murat Başesgioğlu	Motherland Party
Kastamonu	Refik Arslan	Motherland Party
Kayseri	Abdullah Gül	Welfare Party
Kayseri	Salih Kapusuz	Welfare Party
Kayseri	Aykut Edibali	Welfare Party
Kayseri	Mustafa Dağcı	Welfare Party
Kayseri	Osman Develioğlu	Welfare Party
Kayseri	Seyfi Şahin	Welfare Party
Kayseri	Şaban Bayrak	Welfare Party
Kırıkkale	Abdurrahman Ünlü	Democrat Party
Kırıkkale	Hacı Filiz	Democrat Party
Kırıkkale	Muhammet Sadık Avundukluoğlu	Democrat Party
Kırklareli	Ahmet Sezal Özbek	Democrat Party
Kırklareli	Cemal Özbilen	Motherland Party
Kırklareli	İrfan Gürpınar	Social Democratic Populist Party
Kırşehir	Coşkun Gökalp	Social Democratic Populist Party
Kırşehir	Hilmi Yükselen	Social Democratic Populist Party
Kırşehir	Sabri Yavuz	Social Democratic Populist Party
Kocaeli	Alaettin Kurt	Democrat Party
Kocaeli	Halil İbrahim Artvinli	Democrat Party
Kocaeli	İsmail Amasyalı	Democrat Party
Kocaeli	İsmail Kalkandelen	Democrat Party
Kocaeli	Kazım Dinç	Democrat Party
Kocaeli	Bülent Atasayan	Motherland Party
Kocaeli	Şevket Kazan	Welfare Party
Konya	Ali Günaydın	Democrat Party
Konya	Hasan Avşar	Democrat Party
Konya	Mehmet Ali Yavuz	Democrat Party
Konya	Osman Özbek	Democrat Party
Konya	Ömer Şeker	Democrat Party
Konya	Vefa Tanır	Democrat Party
Konya	Mehmet Keçeciler	Motherland Party
Konya	Necmettin Erbakan	Welfare Party
Konya	Abit Kıvrak	Welfare Party
Konya	Ahmet Remzi Hatip	Welfare Party
Konya	Musa Erarıcı	Welfare Party
Konya	Mustafa Ünaldı	Welfare Party
Konya	Servet Turgut	Welfare Party
Kütahya	Hüseyin Cahit Erdemir	Democrat Party
Kütahya	İsmail Karakuyu	Democrat Party
Kütahya	Mustafa Kalemli	Motherland Party
Kütahya	Mehmet Rauf Ertekin	Motherland Party
Kütahya	Ahmet Derin	Welfare Party
Malatya	Yusuf Bozkurt Özal	
Malatya	Metin Emiroğlu	
Malatya	Münir Doğan Ölmeztoprak	
Malatya	Gazi Barut	
Malatya	Mustafa Yılmaz	Social Democratic Populist Party
Malatya	Oğuzhan Asiltürk	Welfare Party
Manisa	Akın Gönen	Democrat Party
Manisa	Cengiz Üretmen	Democrat Party
Manisa	Rıza Akçalı	Democrat Party
Manisa	Sümer Oral	Democrat Party
Manisa	Tevfik Diker	Democrat Party
Manisa	Ümit Canuyar	Democrat Party
Manisa	Yahya Uslu	Democrat Party
Manisa	Ekrem Pakdemirli	Motherland Party
Manisa	Faruk Saydam	Motherland Party
Mardin	Ahmet Türk	Social Democratic Populist Party
Mardin	Ali Yiğit	Social Democratic Populist Party
Mardin	Mehmet Gülcegün	Social Democratic Populist Party
Mardin	Mehmet Sincar	Social Democratic Populist Party
Mardin	Muzaffer Arıkan	Social Democratic Populist Party
Muğla	İrfettin Akar	Democrat Party
Muğla	Latif Sakıcı	Democrat Party
Muğla	Muzaffer İlhan	Democrat Party
Muğla	Nevşat Özer	Motherland Party
Muğla	Erman Şahin	Social Democratic Populist Party
Muş	Mehmet Emin Sever	Social Democratic Populist Party
Muş	Muzaffer Demir	Social Democratic Populist Party
Muş	Sırrı Sakık	Social Democratic Populist Party
Nevşehir	Esat Kıratlıoğlu	Democrat Party
Nevşehir	Osman Seyfi	Democrat Party
Nevşehir	Mehmet Elkatmış	Welfare Party
Niğde	Doğan Baran	Democrat Party
Niğde	İbrahim Arısoy	Democrat Party
Niğde	Rıfat Yüzbaşıoğlu	Democrat Party
Ordu	Hasan Kılıç	Democrat Party
Ordu	Refaiddin Şahin	Democrat Party
Ordu	Cavit Şadi Pehlivanoğlu	Motherland Party
Ordu	Mustafa Bahri Kibar	Motherland Party
Ordu	Nabi Poyraz	Motherland Party
Ordu	Şükrü Yürür	Motherland Party
Rize	Mesut Yılmaz	Motherland Party
Rize	Ahmet Kabil	Motherland Party
Rize	Mustafa Parlak	
Sakarya	Ahmet Neidim	Democrat Party
Sakarya	Mehmet Gölhan	Democrat Party
Sakarya	Nevzat Ercan	Democrat Party
Sakarya	Ersin Taranoğlu	Motherland Party
Sakarya	Mustafa Kılıçaslan	Motherland Party
Sakarya	Cevat Ayhan	Welfare Party
Samsun	Ali Eser	Democrat Party
Samsun	Cemal Alişan	Democrat Party
Samsun	İhsan Saraçlar	Democrat Party
Samsun	İlyas Aktaş	Democrat Party
Samsun	İrfan Demiralp	Democrat Party
Samsun	Mehmet Çebi	Democrat Party
Samsun	Nafiz Kurt	Democrat Party
Samsun	Adem Yıldız	Motherland Party
Samsun	Hüseyin Özalp	Motherland Party
Siirt	Zübeyir Aydar	Social Democratic Populist Party
Siirt	Naif Güneş	Social Democratic Populist Party
Siirt	Mehmet Erdal Koyuncu	Social Democratic Populist Party
Sinop	Kadir Bozkurt	Democrat Party
Sinop	Cafer Sadık Keseroğlu	Democrat Party
Sinop	Yaşar Topçu	Democrat Party
Sivas	Ziya Halis	Social Democratic Populist Party
Sivas	Azimet Köylüoğlu	Social Democratic Populist Party
Sivas	Abdullatif Şener	Welfare Party
Sivas	Muhsin Yazıcıoğlu	Welfare Party
Sivas	Ahmet Arıkan	Welfare Party
Sivas	Musa Demirci	Welfare Party
Şanlıurfa	Sedat Bucak	Democrat Party
Şanlıurfa	Necmettin Cevheri	Democrat Party
Şanlıurfa	Ferit Aydın Mirkelam	Democrat Party
Şanlıurfa	Mehmet Fevzi Şıhanlıoğlu	Democrat Party
Şanlıurfa	Abdurrezak Yavuz	Democrat Party
Şanlıurfa	Seyit Eyyüpoğlu	Motherland Party
Şanlıurfa	Eyyüp Cenap Gülpınar	Motherland Party
Şanlıurfa	İbrahim Halil Çelik	Welfare Party
Şırnak	Mahmut Alınak	Social Democratic Populist Party
Şırnak	Orhan Doğan	Social Democratic Populist Party
Şırnak	Selim Sadak	Social Democratic Populist Party
Tekirdağ	Halil Başol	Democrat Party
Tekirdağ	Muhtar Mahramlı	Democrat Party
Tekirdağ	Fethiye Özver	Democrat Party
Tekirdağ	Hasan Peker	Democrat Party
Tokat	Ali Şevki Erek	Democrat Party
Tokat	Güler İleri	Social Democratic Populist Party
Tokat	Şahin Ulusoy	Social Democratic Populist Party
Tokat	Ahmet Feyzi İnceöz	Welfare Party
Tokat	İbrahim Kumaş	Welfare Party
Tokat	Ahmet Özdemir	Welfare Party
Trabzon	Mehmet Ali Yılmaz	Democrat Party
Trabzon	Eyüp Aşık	Motherland Party
Trabzon	Ali Kemal Başaran	Motherland Party
Trabzon	Fahrettin Kurt	Motherland Party
Trabzon	Koray Aydın	Welfare Party
Trabzon	Kemalettin Göktaş	Welfare Party
Tunceli	Kamer Genç	Social Democratic Populist Party
Tunceli	Vahdet Sinan Yerlikaya	Social Democratic Populist Party
Uşak	Fahri Gündüz	Social Democratic Populist Party
Uşak	Ender Karagül	Social Democratic Populist Party
Uşak	Ural Köklü	Social Democratic Populist Party
Van	Mustafa Kaçmaz	Democrat Party
Van	Nadir Kartal	Democrat Party
Van	Şerif Bedirhanoğlu	Motherland Party
Van	Remzi Kartal	Social Democratic Populist Party
Van	Fethullah Erbaş	Welfare Party
Yozgat	Lütfullah Kayalar	Motherland Party
Yozgat	Mahmut Orhon	Motherland Party
Yozgat	Yaşar Erbaz	Welfare Party
Yozgat	Hüseyin Erdal	Welfare Party
Yozgat	Alparslan Türkeş	Welfare Party
Zonguldak	Adnan Akın	Democrat Party
Zonguldak	Şinasi Altıner	Democrat Party
Zonguldak	Ömer Barutçu	Democrat Party
Zonguldak	Güneş Müftüoğlu	Democrat Party
Zonguldak	Ali Uzun	Democrat Party
Zonguldak	Necdet Yazıcı	Democrat Party
Zonguldak	Bülent Ecevit	Democratic Left Party
