= Veysel Atasoy =

Turkish politician and minister

Minister of Transport
- In office 13 December 1983 – 16 September 1987
- President: Turgut Özal
- Preceded by: Mustafa Aydın Aysan
- Succeeded by: İhsan Pekel

Minister of Energy and Natural Resources
- In office 25 June 1993 – 5 October 1995
- President: Tansu Çiller
- Preceded by: Mehmet Ersin Faralyalı
- Succeeded by: Şinasi Altıner

Member of the Grand National Assembly
- Constituency: Zonguldak (1983, 1987, 1995, 1999); Antalya (1991)

Personal details
- Born: 1947 Zonguldak, Turkey
- Died: 24 August 2004 (aged 56–57) Ankara, Turkey
- Occupation: Politician

Veysel Atasoy (1947, Zonguldak – 24 August 2004, Ankara) was a Turkish politician who served as the Minister of Transport in the 45th government of Turkey and the Minister of Energy and Natural Resources in the 50th government of Turkey.

== Early and personal life ==
Atasoy was born in 1947 in Zonguldak. He attended the Kabataş High School before going to the Faculty of Political Science of Ankara University in 1971 and the Institution of Social Science at Istanbul University. He had two children. His sister was married with Turkish singer Osman Yağmurdereli.

== Career ==
He was one of the founding members of the Motherland Party. He served as the Minister of Transport in the 45th government of Turkey and the Minister of Energy and Natural Resources in the 50th government of Turkey. Additionally, he was a member of the 17th, 18th, 19th, 20th, and 21st Parliaments of Turkey from the Motherland Party and the True Path Party.

== Death ==
Atasoy died on 24 August 2004 after being admitted to hospital for complications with his pulmonary pleurae. He was buried on 26 August at the Cebeci Asri Cemetery.
