= 49th government of Turkey =

Government of the Republic of Turkey (1991-1993)

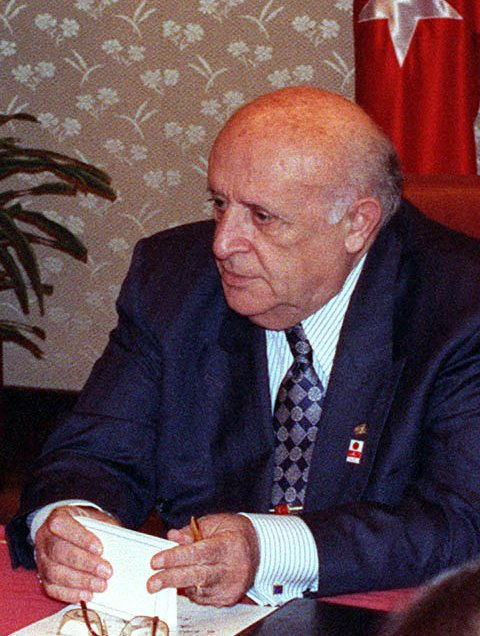
Süleyman Demirel, 1998

The 49th government of Turkey (20 November 1991 – 25 June 1993) was a coalition government formed by True Path Party (DYP) and Social Democratic Populist Party (SHP).

== Election ==
The governing party in Turkey between 1983 and 1991 was Motherland Party (ANAP), but in the elections held on 20 October 1991, no party could win the majority. While ANAP gained 115 seats, DYP gained 178 and SHP gained 88 seats out of 450. DYP and SHP formed the coalition government. Süleyman Demirel (leader of DYP) was the prime minister, and Erdal İnönü (leader of SHP) was the deputy (later acting) prime minister.

== The government ==
There were 14 state ministers, and one was changed during the lifespan of the cabinet. In the list below, the serving period of cabinet members who served only a part of the cabinet's lifespan are shown in the column "Notes".

Title	Name	Party	Notes
Prime Minister	Süleyman Demirel	DYP	
Deputy Prime Minister	Erdal İnönü	SHP	
Minister of State
Minister of State	Cavit Çağlar	DYP	
Minister of State	Tansu Çiller	DYP	
Minister of State	Ekrem Ceyhun	DYP	
Minister of State	Akın Gönen	DYP	
Minister of State	Gökberk Ergenekon	DYP	
Minister of State	Sefa Kilercioğlu	DYP	
Minister of State	Ömer Barutçu	DYP	
Minister of State	Mehmet Batallı	DYP	
Minister of State	Şerif Ercan	DYP	
Minister of State	Mehmet Ali Yılmaz	DYP	
Minister of State	Mehmet Kahraman	DYP	
Minister of State	Güler İleri; Türkan Akyol	SHP	21 November 1991 – 22 February 1992; 22 February 1992 – 25 June 1993
Minister of State	Erman Şahin	SHP	
Minister of State	İbrahim Tez	SHP	
Ministry of Justice	Seyfi Oktay	SHP	
Ministry of National Defense	Nevzat Ayaz	DYP	
Ministry of the Interior	İsmet Sezgin	DYP	
Ministry of Foreign Affairs	Hikmet Çetin	SHP	
Ministry of Finance	Sümer Oral	DYP	
Ministry of National Education	Köksal Toptan	DYP	
Ministry of Public Works and Settlement	Onur Kumbaracıbaşı	SHP	
Ministry of Health and Social Security	Yıldırım Aktuna	DYP	
Ministry of Transport	Yaşar Topçu	DYP	
Ministry of Labour and Social Security	Mehmet Moğultay	SHP	
Ministry of Industry and Commerce	Tahir Köse	SHP	
Ministry of Culture	Fikri Sağlar	SHP	
Ministry of Tourism	Abdülkadir Ateş	SHP	
Ministry of Energy and Natural Resources	Ersin Faralyalı	DYP	
Ministry of Agriculture and Village Affairs	Necmettin Cevheri	DYP	
Ministry of Forest	Vefa Tanır	DYP	
Ministry of Environment	Bedrettin Akyürek	DYP	

== Aftermath ==
On 16 May 1993, Süleyman Demirel was elected as the president of Turkey. According to the constitution, he left both the office and his post in the party. On 13 June 1993, DYP elected Tansu Çiller as its new leader, and thus, on 25 June, Tansu Çiller was appointed as the first female prime minister of Turkey and of the 50th government. Between 16 May and 25 June, Erdal İnönü was the acting prime minister.

Preceded by 48th government of Turkey (Mesut Yılmaz)	49th Government of Turkey; 21 November 1991 – 25 June 1993	Succeeded by 50th government of Turkey (Tansu Çiller)
