= Ali Şahin =

Ali Şahin may refer to:

== Politics ==
- Ali Şahin (politician, born 1921) (1921–1972), Member of Parliament for Gaziantep from DP
- Ali Şahin (politician, born 1934), Member of Parliament for Kahramanmaraş from SHP and CHP
- Ali Şahin (politician, born 1970), Member of Parliament for Gaziantep from AKP

== Sports ==
- Ali Şahin (wrestler) (born 1944), Turkish Olympic wrestler
- Ali Şahin (taekwondo), Turkish taekwondo coach and competitor

== See also ==
- Mehmet Ali Şahin
