= Baykam =

Baykam is a Turkish surname which means "physician". Notable people with the surname include:

- Bedri Baykam, Turkish artist
- Suphi Baykam (1926–1996), Turkish physician and politician
