= Leyla Yeniay Köseoğlu =

Turkish politician

Member of the 17th Parliament for Istanbul
- In office 6 November 1983 – 29 November 1987

Member of the 18th Parliament for Istanbul
- In office 29 November 1987 – 20 October 1991

Member of the 19th Parliament for Istanbul
- In office 6 November 1991 – 24 December 1995

Personal details
- Born: Leyla Yeniay; 1926 Beşiktaş, Istanbul, Turkey
- Died: 19 May 2002 (aged 75–76) Bodrum, Muğla, Turkey
- Party: Motherland Party ANAP
- Children: 2
- Occupation: Politician

Leyla Yeniay Köseoğlu (evlilik öncesi Oğan, 1926 – 19 May 2002) was a Turkish politician. She served three terms in the parliament.

== Politician career ==
She co-founded Motherland Party (Turkish: Anavatan Partisi, ANAP) in 1983, when political parties were allowed after the junta of the 1980 coup d'état banned all parties.

She ran for the Deputy of Istanbul in the 1983 general election, and entered the Grand National Assembly of Turkey. She served in the 17th Parliament until 1987. She continued her political career in the 1987 general election and served in the 18th Parliament. In 1991, she took part at the general election and served the last time in the parliament until 1995.

== Personal life ==
Leyla Yeniay was born to Abdil Oğan and Afife in Beşiktaş district of Istanbul, Turkey in 1926. Her grandfather Hacı Bekir Efendi, originated from Akşekir, was the Deputy of Konya in the first and second term of the First Parliament in the 1920s. She completed her education at Arnavutkoey American High School for Girls in Istanbul.

She worked as a merchant and exporter.

She gave birth to two sons, AHmet and Mustafa Köseoğlu.

In 1999, she was sentenced to one year, three months imprisonment and 4.5 million Turkish lira (around 9 US$) fine for breaking the Forest Law by cutting down trees as the chair of a house building cooperative. The imprisonment was postponed.

LeylaYeniay Köseoğlu died from heart attack in Bodrum, Muğla on 19 May 2002. Her body was transferred to Istanbul and was buried in the family grave at Edirnekapı Martyr's Cemetery following the religious service held at Şişli Mosque two days later.
