= 51st government of Turkey =

Government of the Republic of Turkey (1995)

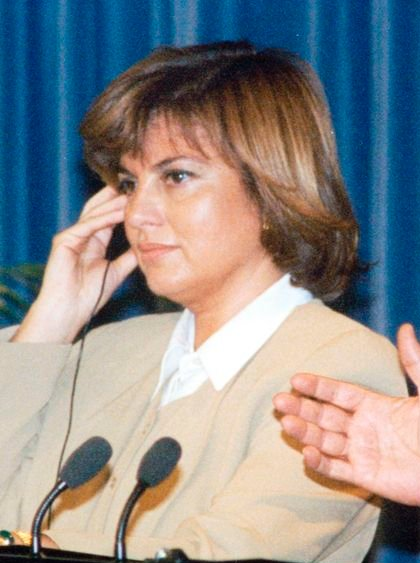
Tansu Çiller

The 51st government of Turkey (5 October 1995 – 30 October 1995) was a minority government led by Tansu Çiller.

== Background ==
Both the 49th and 50th governments were True Path Party and Social Democratic Populist Party (SHP) coalition governments, but after SHP merged with Republican People's Party (CHP) and Deniz Baykal was elected as the new leader of CHP, CHP stipulated an earlier date for the scheduled elections, and the coalition came to end.

== The government ==
Title	Name	Party
Prime Minister	Tansu Çiller	DYP
Deputy Prime Minister	Necmettin Cevheri	DYP
Minister of State
Minister of State	Cavit Çağlar	DYP
Minister of State	Ali Münif İslamoğlu	DYP
Minister of State	Aykon Doğan	DYP
Minister of State	Esat Kıratlıoğlu	DYP
Minister of State	Rıfaeddin Şahin	DYP
Minister of State	Ayvaz Gökdemir	DYP
Minister of State	Ömer Barutçu	DYP
Minister of State	Mehmet Batallı	DYP
Minister of State	Baki Tuğ	DYP
Minister of State	Işılay Saygın	DYP
Minister of State	Mehmet Selim Ensarioğlu	DYP
Ministry of Justice	Bekir Sami Daçe	DYP
Ministry of National Defense	Vefa Tanır	DYP
Ministry of the Interior	Nahit Menteşe	DYP
Ministry of Foreign Affairs	Coşkun Kırca	DYP
Ministry of Finance	İsmet Atilla	DYP
Ministry of National Education	Turhan Tayan	DYP
Ministry of Public Works and Settlement	Tunç Bilget	DYP
Ministry of Health and Social Security	Doğan Baran	DYP
Ministry of Transport	Ali Şevki Erek	DYP
Ministry of Labour and Social Security	Ateş Amiklioğlu	DYP
Ministry of Industry and Commerce	Abdülbaki Ataç	DYP
Ministry of Culture	Köksal Toptan	DYP
Ministry of Tourism	Bilal Güngör	DYP
Ministry of Energy and Natural Resources	Şinasi Altınel	DYP
Ministry of Agriculture and Village Affairs	Nafiz Kurt	DYP
Ministry of Forestry	Hasan Ekinci	DYP
Ministry of Environment	Ahmet Hamdi Üçpınarlar	DYP

== Aftermath ==
The government lost the vote of confidence on 13 October 1995. For the next 17 days it served as a caretaker government.

Preceded by 50th government of Turkey (Tansu Çiller)	51st Government of Turkey; 5 October 1995 – 30 October 1995	Succeeded by 52nd government of Turkey (Tansu Çiller)
