= Alpago (disambiguation) =

Alpago is a comune in the Province of Belluno in the Italian region Veneto.

Alpago may also refer to:

== People ==
- Andrea Alpago (c. 1450–1521), Italian physician and Arabist
- Önay Alpago (born 1947), Turkish female jurist, politician and academic

== See also ==
- Chies d'Alpago, Italian comune
