= Tirebolu mine =

Copper mine in Turkey

- Location: Tirebolu, Giresun Province, Turkey
- Products: Copper
- Opened: 1966
- Company: Etibank

The Tirebolu mine is a large mine in the north of Turkey in Giresun Province, 517 km north of the country's capital, Ankara. Tirebolu represents one of the largest copper reserve in Turkey having estimated reserves of 8.6 million tonnes of ore grading 3% copper and 2% zinc. This translates to 260,000 tonnes of copper metal and 172,000 tonnes of zinc metal.
