= İrfan Gürpınar =

Turkish politician (1943–2020)

İrfan Gürpınar (1943 – 7 December 2020) was a Turkish politician. He was aligned center-left and served two brief terms as Turkey's tourism minister.

== Early life ==
Gürpınar was born in Kırklareli in 1943. After high school he attended Istanbul University's Faculty of Law and went on to work as a lawyer.

== Career ==
He stood for parliament as a candidate of the Social Democratic Populist Party (SHP) in Kırklareli at the election of 29 November 1987. He was one of three deputies elected from the province.

Gürpınar retained his seat at the subsequent election on 20 October 1991, again standing for the SHP, which formed a ruling coalition with the True Path Party (DYP).

On 29 January 1995, the SHP merged with the Republican People's Party (CHP), and a few weeks later, on 7 March 1995, Gürpınar received his first ministerial appointment, succeeding Şahin Ulusoy as minister of tourism in the DYP–CHP coalition government under Prime Minister Tansu Çiller. He served in this role for seven months. Activities during Gürpınar's first term include a visit to Damascus 11–14 April 1995 that resulted in an executive protocol for tourism cooperation between Turkey and Syria.

On 5 October 1995, CHP leader Deniz Baykal withdrew his party from the ruling coalition with the DYP in an attempt to trigger a fresh election and boost the CHP's position in the parliament. Consequently, all CHP ministers including Gürpınar lost their appointments and Tansu Çiller operated a minority government during the period 5–30 October 1995, with Bilal Güngör serving as minister of tourism. The government lost a confidence vote on 13 October, and by 30 October Baykal and Çiller reached an agreement to reinstate the coalition government until parliamentary elections could be held. Gürpınar resumed his position as tourism minister.

Gürpınar stood as a CHP candidate at the 25 December 1995 national election. Although he was reelected, the CHP barely exceeded the 10 percent national threshold to receive any seats and lost 39 seats overall. No party had a majority in the resulting parliament, but it was clear that the largest was the Islamist Welfare Party (RP) with 158 of the 550 seats. This was a concern for the secular establishment and for Turkey's military, as religion had been rigorously excluded from politics since the founding of the Turkish Republic. While negotiations continued among the four secular parties on forming a coalition, Tansu Çiller stayed in office as prime minister with the same cabinet as before the election. Consequently, Gürpınar's second term as tourism minister ran from 30 October 1995 to 6 March 1996. This came to an end when the caretaker government was replaced by a coalition of two center-right parties, the DYP and the Motherland Party (ANAP). The new minister of tourism was Işılay Saygın, a DYP deputy who had previously served as minister of women's and family affairs and minister of the environment.

While Gürpınar remained a deputy representing Kırklareli for the rest of the 20th parliament, neither he nor his party returned to government. During this time out of government, Gürpınar was the sponsor of a March 1997 bill proposing the establishment of Kırklareli University and March 1998 bill proposing a Turkey Hoteliers Association Law. Neither bill became law, but Kırklareli University was ultimately founded in 2007.

At the 18 April 1999 election, the CHP gained only 8.7 percent support nationwide, and was therefore awarded no deputies in parliament. Kırklareli was represented by two deputies from the Democratic Left Party (DSP) and one from ANAP.

After leaving parliament, Gürpınar was still a senior member of the CHP leadership.

== Personal life and death ==
Gürpınar was married and had one child. He died from COVID-19 in Ankara on 7 December 2020, at age 77, during the COVID-19 pandemic in Turkey. His funeral took place at the Parliament building on 8 December, attended by his family and politicians including Culture and Tourism Minister Mehmet Nuri Ersoy and the CHP leadership. Following prayers at Abdurrahman Karamanlıoğlu Mosque he was buried at Gölbaşı Cemetery.

== Sources ==
- "Eski Turizm Bakanı İrfan Gürpınar Koronavirüs nedeniyle hayatını kaybetti" [Former Tourism Minister İrfan Gürpınar dies due to coronavirus]. T24 (in Turkish). 7 December 2020.
- İşbaran, Vahit (7 December 2020). "Eski bakan İrfan Gürpınar, koronavirüs nedeniyle yaşamını yitirdi" [Former Minister İrfan Gürpınar dies due to coronavirus]. Hürriyet (in Turkish).
- Köse, Türey (28 January 2014). ""İhraç yolsuzluktan değil"" ["Expulsion is not due to corruption"]. Cumhuriyet (in Turkish).
- Uslu, Sinan (8 December 2020). "Eski Turizm Bakanı Gürpınar için TBMM'de cenaze töreni düzenlendi" [Funeral ceremony for former Tourism Minister Gürpınar held at Parliament]. Anadolu Ajansı (in Turkish).
