= Orhaneli mine =

Chromium mine in Orhaneli, Bursa Province, Turkey

- Location: Orhaneli, Bursa Province, Turkey
- Products: Chromium
- Opened: 1980
- Company: Etibank

The Orhaneli mine is a large mine in the west of Turkey in Bursa Province 331 km west of the capital, Ankara. Orhaneli represents one of the largest chromium reserve in Turkey having estimated reserves of 1 million tonnes of chromium ore grading 48% chromium metal. The 1 million tonnes of ore contains 480,000 tonnes of chromium metal.
