= Interbank (disambiguation) =

Interbank may refer to

- Interbank, a Peruvian bank
- İnterbank, a defunct Turkish bank
- Interbank market, the foreign exchange market of currencies
- a defunct credit card service from MasterCard
- InterBank, a bank in Texas and Oklahoma
