= 52nd government of Turkey =

Government of the Republic of Turkey (1995–1996)

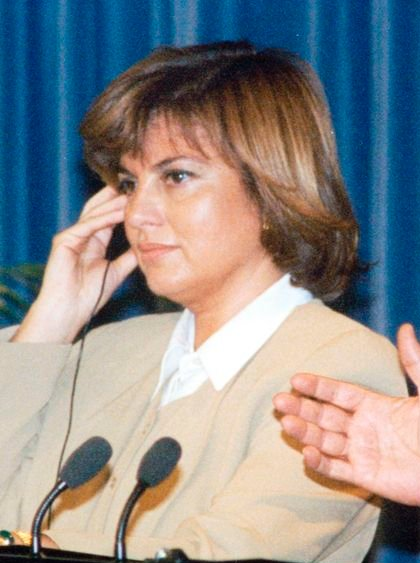
Tansu Çiller

The 52nd government of Turkey (30 October 1995 – 6 March 1996) was a caretaker coalition government formed by True Path Party (DYP) and Republican People's Party (CHP).

== Background ==
The 50th government of Turkey came to an end because Deniz Baykal of CHP asked for an earlier date for the scheduled elections. Prime minister Tansu Çiller tried a minority government, but the 51st government of Turkey could not receive the vote of confidence. Tansu Çiller accepted Deniz Baykal's proposal, and the 52nd government was formed as a caretaker government until the elections. In the government, most of the DYP ministers kept the same seats they held in the 51st government.

== The government ==
In the list below, the serving period of cabinet members who served only a part of the cabinet's lifespan are shown in the column "Notes". According to the Turkish constitution, independent names are to be appointed to interior, justice, and transportation ministries before the elections.

Title	Name	Party	Notes
Prime Minister	Tansu Çiller	DYP	
Deputy Prime Minister and Ministry of Foreign Affairs	Deniz Baykal	CHP	
Minister of State
Minister of State	Necmettin Cevheri	DYP	
Minister of State	Cavit Çağlar	DYP	
Minister of State	Abdülkadir Ateş	CHP	
Minister of State	Aykon Doğan	DYP	
Minister of State	Ali Dincer	CHP	
Minister of State	Ayvaz Gökdemir	DYP	
Minister of State	Ali Münif İslamoğlu	DYP	
Minister of State	Adnan Ekmen	CHP	
Minister of State	Coşkun Kırca	DYP	30 October 1995 – 6 February 1996
Minister of State	Ömer Barutçu	DYP	
Minister of State	Mehmet Sevigen	CHP	
Minister of State	Işılay Saygın	DYP	30 October 1995 – 23 February 1996
Minister of State	Mehmet Alp	CHP	
Minister of State	Selim Ensarioğlu	DYP	
Minister of State	Bekir Sami Daçe	DYP	31 October 1995 – 29 November 1995
Ministry of Justice	Bekir Sami Daçe; Firuz Çilingiroğlu	DYP; Indep	30 October 1995 – 31 November 1995; 31 October 1995 – 6 March 1996
Ministry of National Defense	Vefa Tanır	DYP	
Ministry of the Interior	Nahit Menteşe; Teoman Ünüsan	DYP; Indep	30 October 1995 – 31 October 1995; 31 October 1995 – 6 March 1996
Ministry of Finance	İsmet Atilla	DYP	
Ministry of National Education	Turhan Tayan	DYP	
Ministry of Public Works and Settlement	Adnan Keskin	CHP	
Ministry of Health and Social Security	Doğan Baran	DYP	
Ministry of Transport	Ali Şevki Erek; Oğuz Tezmen	DYP; Indep	30 October 1995 – 31 October 1995; 31 October 1995 – 6 March 1996
Ministry of Labour and Social Security	Mustafa Kul	CHP	
Ministry of Industry and Commerce	Fuat Çay	CHP	
Ministry of Culture	Fikri Sağlar	CHP	
Ministry of Tourism	İrfan Gürpınar	DYP	
Ministry of Energy and Natural Resources	Şinasi Altınel	DYP	
Ministry of Agriculture and Village Affairs	Nafiz Kurt	DYP	
Ministry of Forestry	Hasan Ekinci	DYP	
Ministry of Environment	Ahmet Hamdi Üçpınarlar; Işılay Saygın	DYP	30 October 1995 – 7 February 1996; 23 February 1996 – 6 February 1996

== Aftermath ==
The elections held on 24 December 1995 marked the end of the government. However, before the next government was formed, the 52nd government continued as caretaker.

Preceded by 51st government of Turkey (Tansu Çiller)	52nd Government of Turkey; 30 October 1995 – 6 March 1996	Succeeded by 53rd government of Turkey (Mesut Yılmaz)
