= Aysel Baykal =

Turkish politician

Minister of State (Women, Family and Social Policies)
- In office March 27, 1995 – October 5, 1995
- Prime Minister: Tansu Çiller
- Preceded by: Önay Alpago
- Succeeded by: Işılay Saygın

Personal details
- Born: 1939 Ankara, Turkey
- Died: January 24, 2003 (aged 63–64) Istanbul, Turkey
- Resting place: Old Topkapı Cemetery, Istanbul
- Party: Republican People's Party (CHP)
- Education: Law
- Alma mater: Istanbul University Faculty of Law
- Occupation: Jurist, politician

Aysel Baykal (1939 – January 24, 2003) was a Turkish female jurist, politician and former government minister.

Aysel Baykal graduated from Istanbul University's Faculty of Law. She served as a city councillor in the local government legislative bodies of Istanbul Province and Istanbul Municipality. On October 14, 1979, she became a member of the Senate of the Republic representing Istanbul from the Republican People's Party (CHP), which ended on September 12, 1980, when the Senate was dissolved by the 1980 military coup. She entered the 18th parliament, and served until 1991.

Following the merger of the 1983-established Social Democratic Populist Party (SHP) with the CHP in 1995, Baykal was appointed from outside the parliament Minister of State responsible for "Women, Family and Social Policies" on March 27, 1995, succeeding Önay Alpago. She served at this post in the 50th government led by female Prime Minister of Turkey Tansu Çiller until October 5, 1995.

In September 1995, she led a group of 14 Turkish women organizations to the World Conference on Women held in Beijing, China. She ran for the 1999 general election without success.

Aysel Baykal died in Istanbul at the age of 64 on January 24, 2003. She was buried at the Old Topkapı Cemetery following the religious funeral service at Şişli Mosque.

Political offices
Preceded by Önay Alpago	Minister of State of Turkey (Women, Family and Social Policies); March 27, 1995 – October 5, 1995	Succeeded by Işılay Saygın
