= Kasrık mine =

Phosphate mine in Turkey

- Location: Mardin, Mardin Province, Turkey
- Products: Phosphates
- Opened: 1973
- Company: Etibank

The Kasrık mine is a large mine in the south-east of Turkey in Mardin Province 743 km south-east of the capital, Ankara. Kasrık represents one of the largest phosphates reserve in Turkey having estimated reserves of 110 million tonnes of ore grading 25% P_{2}O_{5}.
