= Cem Kozlu =

Turkish businessman, politician and writer

Mehmet Cem Kozlu MP

Member of the Grand National Assembly
- In office 20 October 1991 – 24 December 1995
- Constituency: Istanbul (1991)

Personal details
- Born: 1946 (age 79–80) Istanbul, Turkey
- Education: Robert College
- Alma mater: Denison University (BS); Stanford Graduate School of Business (MBA); Boğaziçi University (PhD)
- Occupation: Politician; businessman

Mehmet Cem Kozlu (born 1946, Istanbul) is a Turkish businessman, politician and writer. He was the CEO of Turkish Airlines before joining the Motherland Party and becoming an MP.

== Early and personal life ==
Kozlu was born in 1946 in Istanbul. He studied at Robert College, Denison University, Stanford University and Boğaziçi University. Kozlu is married and has two children.

== Career ==
Kozlu was the CEO of Turkish Airlines from 1988 to 1991. During his time in this position, the management approach of the airline changed to give more importance to IT. After leaving, he became an MP at the 19th Parliament of Turkey for the Motherland Party. From 1997 to 2003, he returned to Turkish Airlines and became the chairman of the board. He later worked at The Coca-Cola Company in several positions before retiring in 2006. Kozlu has written 9 books.
