= Turkish National Student Union =

Organization

Turkish National Student Union (Turkish: Millî Türk Talebe Birliği; MTTB) was a nationalist and later Islamist organization in Turkey. It was Turkish nationalist from 1946 to 1960s, Turkish nationalist and Islamist during the 1960s, and fully Islamist from 1970 until its 1980 closure. It was originally founded in 1916, and closed on November 22, 1936, but was revivedin 1946 by Reha Köseoğlu, Tahsin Atakan, and Rehai İslam. It was headquartered in Istanbul. It was closed in 1980 after the 1980 Turkish coup d'état. It was partially revived again on March 27, 2008, under the name of Student Union Federation, although is less popular.

== History ==
MTTB was first established on December 14, 1916, based on Turkish nationalism, secularism, Pan-Turkism, and Turanism. Towards the 1960s, the group shifted to Turkish–Islamic synthesis, and a large faction shifted to Islamism and left the nationalism. In 1924, university students took action by passing out discounts on tram tickets. MTTB first announced its name in this action. On April 27, 1927, it gained legal status. Between 1931 and 1933, Tevfik İleri was the chairman. The Union took part in the Razgrad incident protests in 1933. Tevfik İleri will later become a Samsun Deputy for the Democratic Party, and was arrested after the 1960 Turkish coup d'état and sentenced to death. However, the verdict against it later will be converted to a life sentence. MTTB was closely allied with the Turkish Hearths until 1936. İleri was ideologically a Kemalist, Turkish nationalist, and Turanist. In fact, the symbol of MTTB changed to the Grey Wolf under his rule. They made rallies such as 'Citizen, Speak Turkish', and 'Annexation of Hatay to Turkey', and 'Remembrance of Çanakkale Martyrs' in that period too. However, because they made a rally without permission, the MTTB was closed on November 22, 1936. 10 years after it was closed, on February 5, 1946, a group of young people came together and revived the MTTB under the name of the Student Union. Later, it took the name of the MTTB again in 1947. The MTTB continued its nationalist activities. They organized meetings and started anti-communist campaigns.

During the late 1960s, the MTTB began shifting towards Islamism and became the top organization for Islamist or conservative politicians who were opposed to Kemalism. The MTTB was divided between Millî Görüş Islamists and Idealists, and the number of Islamists was increasing. In 1969, the MHP nominated its politician Mustafa Ok during the MTTB chairmanship election in order to draw the MTTB away from Islamism and more to extreme nationalism. At the congress, held in Kayseri on May 3, 1969, Islamists and Idealists of the MTTB fought each other and 20 people were injured; during the fight, one side chanted "Muslim Turkey" and the other side "Nationalist Turkey". At the end of the 1969 elections, Burhanettin Kayhan, an Islamist, was elected, which further drew the MTTB towards Islamism and away from nationalism. The Islamists criticised the Idealists and claimed that the Turkish-Islamic synthesis is a manmade ideology which corrupts Islam.

Infighting between Idealists and Islamists within the MTTB led to an Islamist victory in 1975, in which the MTTB emblem, which was a Grey wolf inside a crescent, was briefly changed into a Quran inside a crescent, and then to a simple crescent. The Idealists left the MTTB and formed CKMP. The majority of MTTB members supported the MSP and Raiders Organization, in which the wider Millî Görüş movement wanted the MTTB to be the MSP's youth wing. The MTTB was shut down after the 1980 Turkish coup d'état.

Although the 1970s in Turkey were full of Anti-Kurdish sentiment, the new Islamist-led MTTB had an Islamic brotherhood approach and condemned the racism. Many Islamist Kurds joined the MTTB as there was a lack of Kurdish Islamist groups at the time, and many right-wing Kurds joined it as it was one of the few right-wing groups which did not hold Anti-Kurdish views, unlike the various Kemalist, Idealist, or other nationalist groups. When Hüseyin Velioğlu came to Ankara for university in 1978, he joined the MTTB until 1980.

On March 27, 2008, a group named the Student Union Federation was founded and claimed to be the continuation of the MTTB.

== Notable alumni ==
- Abdülkadir Aksu, Turkish politician
- Bülent Arınç, Turkish politician
- Oğuzhan Asiltürk, Turkish engineer and politician
- Beşir Atalay, Turkish politician
- Suphi Baykam, Turkish politician
- Hüseyin Çelik, Turkish politician
- Ömer Dinçer, Turkish politician
- Recep Tayyip Erdoğan, President of Turkey
- Nihat Erim, Turkish politician
- Namık Gedik, Turkish politician
- Abdullah Gül, Turkish politician
- Tevfik İleri, Turkish politician
- İsmail Kahraman, Turkish politician
- Necip Fazıl Kısakürek, Turkish author and ideologue of the Great East
- Fehmi Koru, Turkish journalist and columnist
- Cemil Meriç, Turkish author and translator
- Kadir Mısıroğlu, Turkish conspiracy theorist
- Hüdai Oral, Turkish politician
- Mustafa Şentop, Turkish politician
- Hüseyin Velioğlu, Kurdish nationalist militant leader
- Taner Yıldız, Turkish politician
