= Hüdai Oral =

Turkish politician (1925–2005)

Ministry of Energy and Natural Resources
- In office 25 December 1963 – 20 February 1965
- Preceded by: (new establishment)
- Succeeded by: Mehmet Turgut
- Prime Minister: İsmet İnönü

Personal details
- Born: 1925 Buldan, Denizli Province, Turkey
- Died: 13 February 2005 (aged 79–80) Denizli, Turkey
- Education: Istanbul University
- Occupation: Politician
- Profession: Lawyer

Arif Hüdai Oral (1925 – 13 February 2005) was a Turkish lawyer, politician and former government minister.

== Life ==
Hüdai Oral was born in Buldan district of Denizli in 1925. After completing the Law school of Istanbul University, he served as an attorney in Denizli. During his university studies he was a member of the Turkish National Student Union.

Oral was married to Perihan Oral, and was father of a daughter Tansu and a son Teoman. He died on 13 February 2005 in Denizli due to respiratory syndrome.

== Political life ==
Hüdai Oral joined the Republican People's Party (CHP) and was elected a deputy from Denizli Province entering the 12th Parliament of Turkey on 15 October 1961. He kept his seat in the 13th, 14th and the 15th Parliament of Turkey. In the 28th government of Turkey, the Ministry of Energy and Natural Resources was established, and Hüdai Oral was appointed as the first government minister of this portfolio. He served between 25 December 1963 and 20 February 1965.

Following the 1980 Turkish coup d'état, CHP was banned. He became one of the charter members of Social Democracy Party (SODEP) in 1983. After SODEP and Populist Party (HP) merged to form the Social Democratic Populist Party (SHP), he was elected a deputy from Denizli Province for the last time during the 18th Parliament of Turkey.
