= Free Democratic Party (Turkey) =

Former political party in Turkey

Liberal Democrat Party (Turkish: Hür Demokrat Parti, "Free Democrat Party", abbreviated HDP) was a former political party in Turkey

There were three parties in the Turkish Parliament during the 17th Parliament of Turkey (1983-1987). The smallest of them was Nationalist Democracy Party (MDP) and according to most analysts, it was further losing support. Consequently, during the congress held on 13 July 1985, Turgut Sunalp the chairman of the party lost against Ülkü Söylemezoğlu. But even after this change the party continued to lose support. At a party congress held on 4 May 1986 the MDP dissolved itself. While some members joined other parties such as True Path Party and Motherland Party, the remaining members formed the Free Democratic Party under the leadership of Mehmet Yazar, the former chairman of the confederation of trade chambers on 9 May 1986.

However, in the by-elections held on 28 September 1986, the Free Democrats could receive only 1.4% and two months later the party dissolved itself and Mehmet Yazar as well as 13 other HDP members joined the Motherland Party.
