= İnterbank =

- Company type: Bank
- Industry: Banking
- Founded: 1888
- Defunct: 2 July 2001
- Headquarters: Istanbul, Turkey
- Products: Financial services
- Parent: TMSF

İnterbank A.Ş is a defunct Turkish bank, the successor of the Banque de Salonique (Turkish: Selanik Bankası T.A.Ş.) founded in 1888 in Thessaloniki (Turkish: Selanik) and relocated to Istanbul in 1910. In 1969, that bank was sold by its French controlling shareholders and renamed Uluslararası Endüstri ve Ticaret Bankası. It was renamed Interbank A.Ş. in 1990, several years after being taken over by Çukurova Holding. Çukurova sold its majority stake to Cavit Çağlar's Nergis Holding in 1996. It was taken over by the government's TMSF on 7 January 1999, merged with Etibank, and went into liquidation on 2 July 2001.

In June 1999, prosecutors alleged that in 1998, Interbank had transferred over $650m to Nergis Holding companies - far in excess of legal limits for intra-group transfers. The total amount owed by Nergis to Interbank was said to be over $1.1bn. In 2004, Çağlar and others associated with Nergis were sentenced to three years and ten months for bank fraud relating to Interbank. He had initially been acquitted in 2002, but the government appealed, and reversed the acquittal. After Interbank was merged with Esbank under Etibank on July 2, 2001, Etibank was merged under Bayındırbank, which was wholly owned by the SDIF. Bayındırbank was renamed Birleşik Fon Bankası A.Ş. with the decision taken by the SDIF on December 7, 2005.
