= İhsan Saraçlar =

Turkish politician

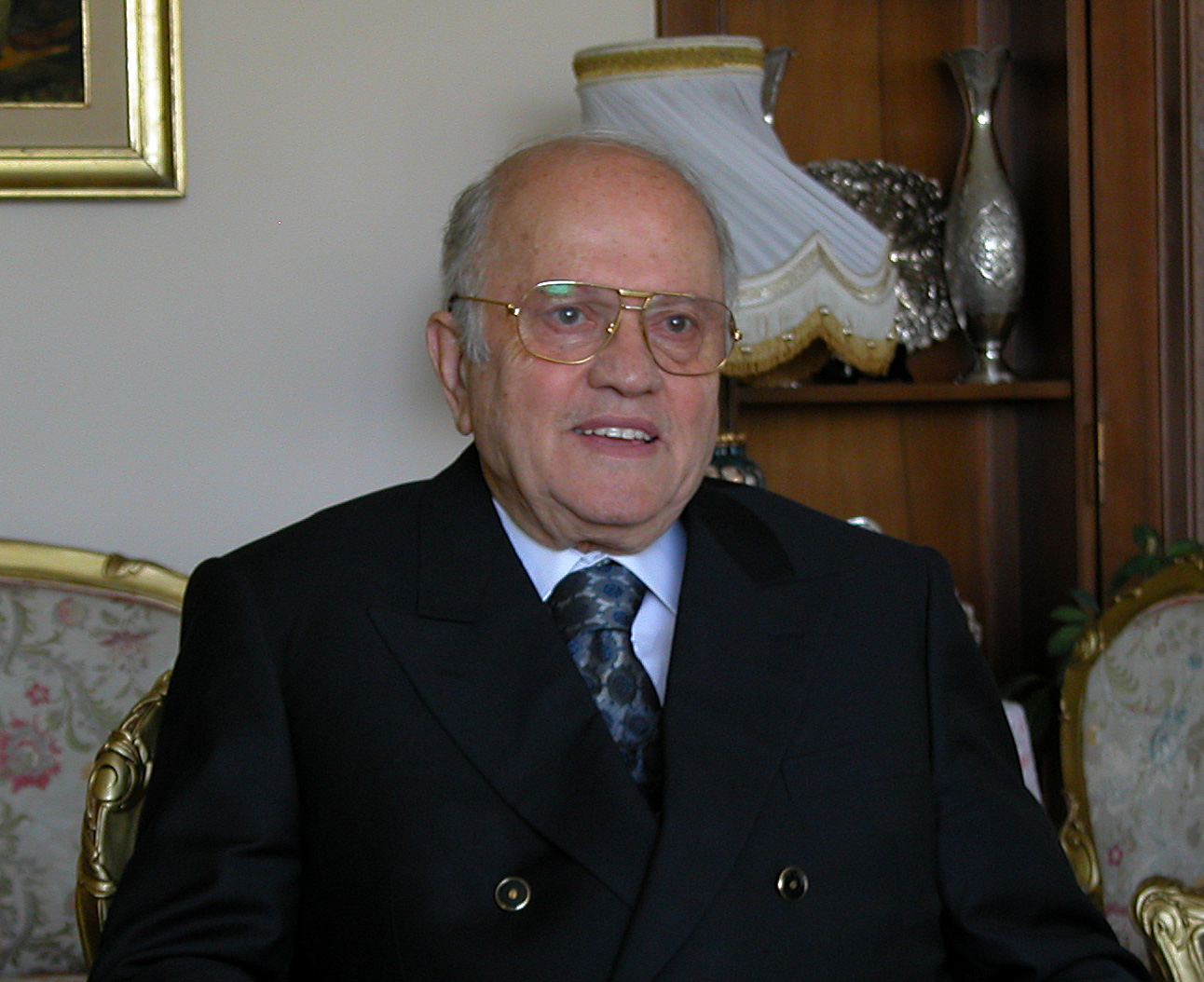
İhsan Saraçlar in 2004.

İhsan Saraçlar (June 6, 1928 – January 5, 2008) was a Turkish lawyer and politician. He was born in Samsun.

From 1991 to 1995 he served as the vice-chairman of the True Path Party. After studying law at the Istanbul University, he became an independent lawyer. He joined the Right Path Party and was a member of the Grand National Assembly of Turkey. He was a long-time vice president of the International Red Cross and Red Crescent Movement. On December 30, 2007 he suffered a stroke, and died a week later in Ankara. He was married and had three children.
