= Ahmet Edip Uğur =

Turkish politician (1950–2021)

- Born: April 7, 1950; Balikesir
- Died: September 8, 2021 (aged 71); Balikesir
- Years active: 1987-2021

Ahmet Edip Uğur (April 7, 1950, Balıkesir - September 8, 2021, Balıkesir) was a Turkish politician and businessman.

In the 1987 general elections, he entered the Turkish Grand National Assembly for the first time as an MP for Balıkesir from the Motherland Party. Ahmet Edip Uğur, who also served as the Founding Provincial Chairman of AK Party Balıkesir, was nominated as a candidate from AK Party in the 2002 general elections and won the election and retained his seat as a 22nd term deputy. In the 2007 General Elections, after re-entering the Parliament as a 23rd term Balıkesir MP, he was appointed as AK Party Deputy Chairman and Head of "Financial and Administrative Affairs". He also served as the Chairman of the Turkey-Indonesia Inter-Parliamentary Friendship Group. In the 2014 local elections, he ran as the Mayor of Balıkesir Metropolitan Municipality from the Justice and Development Party and was elected with 39.7% of the vote.

Uğur died on September 8, 2021, at his home where he was being treated for a brain tumor.
