= Cahit Aral =

Turkish politician (1927–2011)

Hüseyin Cahit Aral
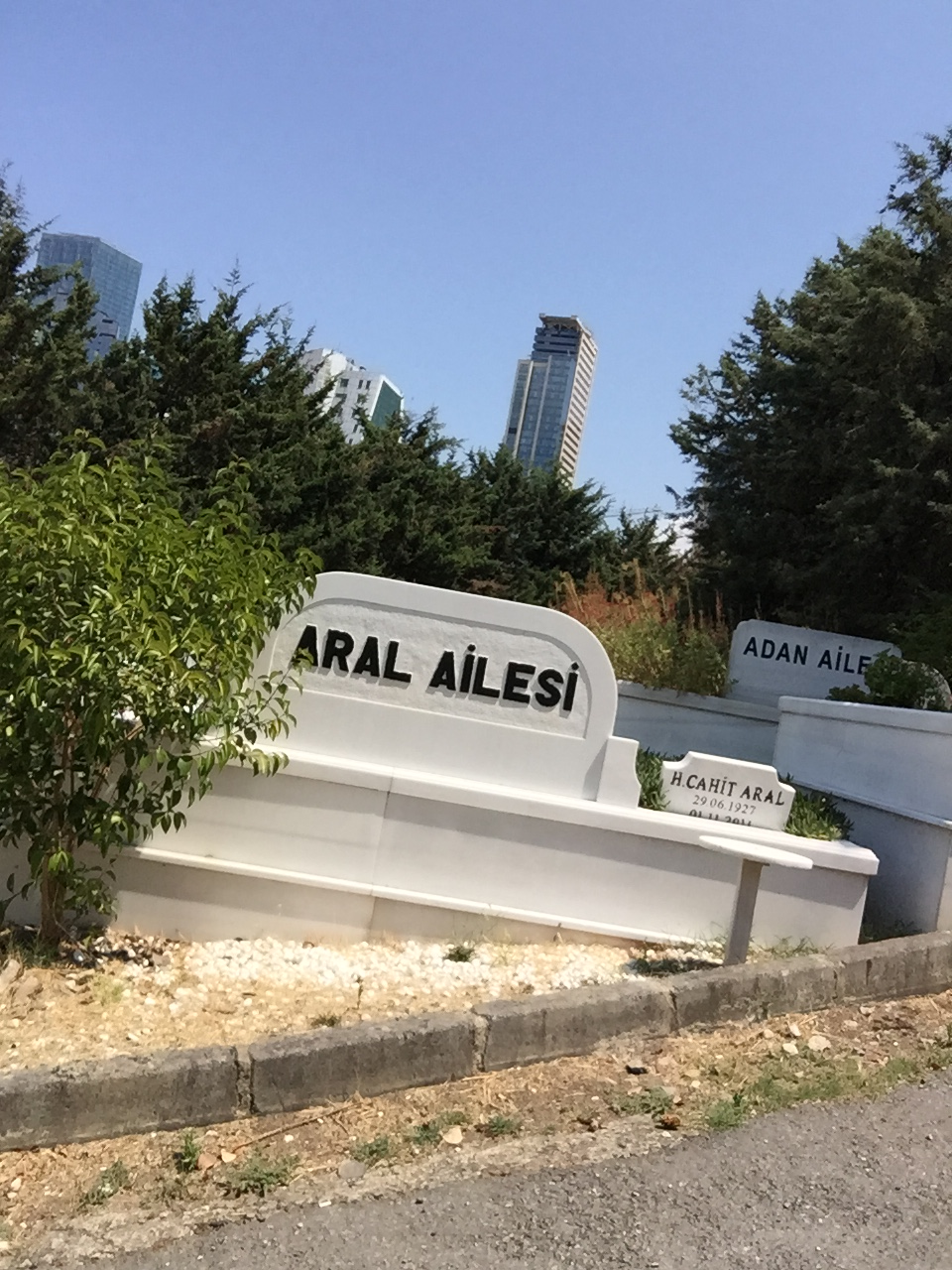
- His grave

Minister of Industry and Commerce
- In office 13 December 1983 – 21 December 1987
- Prime Minister: Turgut Özal
- Preceded by: Mehmet Turgut
- Succeeded by: Şükrü Yürür

Personal details
- Born: 1927 Elazığ, Turkey
- Died: 1 November 2011 (aged 83–84)
- Resting place: Zincirlikuyu Cemetery
- Party: Motherland Party
- Education: Istanbul Technical University

Hüseyin Cahit Aral (1927 – 1 November 2011) was a Turkish engineer, politician and former government minister.

Cahit Aral was born 1927 in Elazığ to primary school teacher parents Fatma and Hakkı Aral. His was named in honor of the writer and journalist Hüseyin Cahit Yalçın (1875–1957). He graduated from the Istanbul Technical University.

Cahit Aral entered politic after working some years in the industry. He was among the founders of the Motherland Party (ANAP), which was established after the 1980 Turkish coup d'état. He served as Minister of Industry of Commerce in the cabinet of Turgut Özal.

He is remembered for his message "Don't worry!" while drinking a glass of tea in front of the cameras following the Chernobyl disaster that occurred on 26 April 1986, and downplaying the disaster's possible risk effects on human health caused by radioactivity released into the environment in the Black Sea Region, where Turkey's tea plantations are located. For this reason, he was nicknamed "Bekerel Cahit" (Cahit the Becquerel).

Cahit Aral died of heart failure on 1 November 2011 in Istanbul. He was laid to rest at the Zincirlikuyu Cemetery on 3 November 2011 following a state funeral and the religious funeral service at Levent Mosque.

Political offices
Preceded by Mehmet Turgut	Minister of Industry of Commerce; 13 December 1983 – 21 December 1987	Succeeded by Şükrü Yürür
