= Önay Alpago =

Turkish politician

Zehra Önay Alpago

Minister of State (Women, Family and Social Policies)
- In office July 27, 1994 – March 27, 1995
- Prime Minister: Tansu Çiller
- Preceded by: Türkân Akyol
- Succeeded by: Aysel Baykal

Personal details
- Born: May 18, 1947 (age 78) Karadeniz Ereğli, Zonguldak Province, Turkey
- Party: Social Democratic Populist Party (SHP); Republican People's Party (CHP)
- Education: Law
- Alma mater: Ankara University, Law School
- Occupation: Jurist, politician, academic

Zehra Önay Alpago (born May 18, 1947) is a Turkish female jurist, politician, former government minister and academic.

== Private life ==
Zehra Önay Alpago was born in Karadeniz Ereğli of Zonguldak Province, northwestern Turkey in 1947. She graduated from Ankara University, Law School in 1969.

After having left the politics, she has been working as a lawyer and serving as an academic at Yeditepe University. As of end 2010, Alpago was elected into the Union of Turkish Bar Associations as a delegate of Bar of Istanbul.

She is married to physician Yıldırım Alpago. She is mother of two.

== Politics ==
Alpago entered politics from the 1983-established Social Democratic Populist Party (SHP), and served two terms as the first ever chairwoman of the party's district branch. She later became a member of the central executive board and vice chairperson of the SHP.

Alpago was appointed from outside the parliament Minister of State responsible for "women, Family and Social Policies" on July 27, 1994, succeeding Türkân Akyol. She served at this post in the 50th government led by female Prime Minister of Turkey Tansu Çiller. On March 27, 1995, she left her post to Aysel Baykal of the Republican People's Party (CHP) when the SHP merged with the CHP.

Political offices
Preceded by Türkân Akyol	Minister of State of Turkey (Women, Family and Social Policies); July 27, 1994 – March 27, 1995	Succeeded by Aysel Baykal
