= Işılay Saygın =

Turkish politician (1947–2019)

Minister of State (Women and Family Affairs)
- In office June 28, 1996 – January 11, 1999
- Prime Minister: Necmettin Erbakan; Mesut Yılmaz
- Preceded by: İmren Aykut

Minister of Tourism
- In office March 6, 1996 – June 28, 1996
- Prime Minister: Mesut Yılmaz
- Preceded by: İrfan Gürpınar
- Succeeded by: Bahattin Yücel

Minister of Environment
- In office February 23, 1996 – March 6, 1996
- Prime Minister: Tansu Çiller
- Preceded by: Ahmet Hamdi Üçpınarlar
- Succeeded by: Mustafa Taşar

Minister of State (Women and Family Affairs)
- In office October 5, 1995 – February 23, 1996
- Prime Minister: Tansu Çiller
- Preceded by: Aysel Baykal
- Succeeded by: İmren Aykut

Personal details
- Born: April 4, 1947 Buca, İzmir Province, Turkey
- Died: July 26, 2019 (aged 72)
- Party: Justice Party (AP); Nationalist Democracy Party (MDP); Motherland Party (ANAP); True Path Party (DYP)
- Education: Architecture
- Alma mater: Ege University
- Occupation: Politician
- Profession: Architect
- Website: www.isilaysaygin.com/tr/

Işılay Saygın (April 4, 1947 – July 26, 2019) was a Turkish architect, politician, and four-time government minister between 1995 and 1999.

İşilay Saygın was born to Osman Nuri Saygın and his wife Fatma in Buca district of İzmir Province, western Turkey. She graduated from Faculty of Architecture at Ege University.

Saygın entered politics in 1973 from the Justice Party (AP) and served two terms as district mayor of her hometown. Her post ended in 1980 after the military coup that year. She then worked as an architect until she returned to politics in 1983 joining the Nationalist Democracy Party (MDP). With the 1983 election, Saygın entered the parliament in its 17th term as a deputy of İzmir. In the following elections of 1987, 1991, 1995 and 1999, she kept her seat in the parliament. After the dissolution of the MDP in 1986, she joined the Motherland Party (ANAP) in 1987 In 1995, she moved to the True Path Party (DYP). In 1997, she returned to her former party ANAP. She was politically active until 2003.

Saygın was appointed four times as a government minister. She became the Minister of State responsible for "Women and Family Affairs" in the 51st government led by female Prime Minister Tansu Çiller succeeding Aysel Baykal, and served between October 5 and October 30, 1995. She continued in her post in the 52nd government led by Çiller until February 23, 1996, replaced by İmren Aykut. The same day, she was appointed Minister of Environment succeeding Ahmet Hamdi Üçpınarlar. On March 6, 1996, Mustafa Taşar took over her office. Prime minister Mesut Yılmaz appointed her the same day Minister of Tourism in the 53rd government. She held the office until June 28, 1996. Saygın took again office of the Minister of State on the same day serving in the 54th government led by Necmettin Erbakan and the 55th government led Mesut Yılmaz until January 11, 1999.

In January 1998, as she was holding the office of Minister of State in charge of "Women and Family Affairs", Saygın was criticized when she defended the practice of virginity testing in an interview she gave to a daily. Feminists demanded her resignation.

Political offices
Preceded by Aysel Baykal	Minister of State of Turkey (Women and Family Affairs); October 5, 1995 – February 23, 1996	Succeeded by İmren Aykut
Preceded by Ahmet Hamdi Üçpınarlar	Minister of Environment of Turkey; February 23, 1996 – March 6, 1996	Succeeded by Mustafa Taşar
Preceded by İrfan Gürpınar	Minister of Tourism of Turkey; March 6, 1996 – June 28, 1996	Succeeded by Bahattin Yücel
Preceded by İmren Aykut	Minister of State of Turkey (Women and Family Affairs); June 28, 1996 – January 11, 1999	Succeeded by
