= Bedri Baykam =

Turkish artist

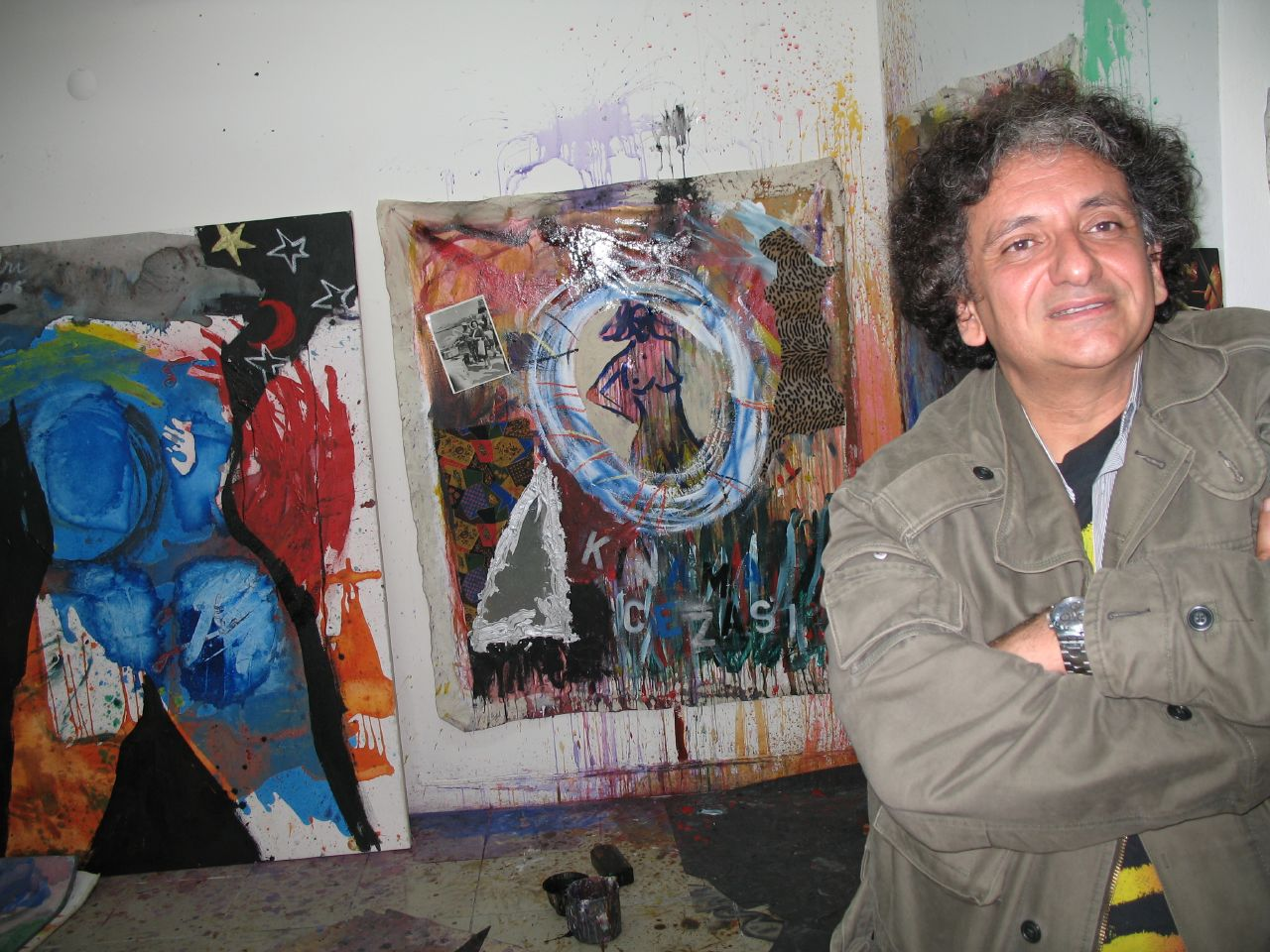
- Bedri Baykam at his atelier
- Born: Ankara, Turkey
- Education: California College of the Arts
- Known for: Painting, Writing, Film
- Website: https://www.bedribaykam.com/

Bedri Baykam is a Turkish artist.

== Early life ==
Baykam was born in Ankara, Turkey. Baykam's father, Suphi Baykam, was a deputy in the Turkish parliament, and his mother, Mutahhar Baykam, is an architectural engineer.

Baykam studied at Sorbonne University in Paris from 1975 to 1980 and earned an MBA degree. During this time, he studied drama in L'Actorat, Paris. He lived in California from 1980 to 1987, studied painting and film-making at California College of Arts and Crafts, in Oakland. He returned to Turkey in 1987 to live in Istanbul.

Baykam played tennis throughout the 70s placing well at the Turkey Tennis Championships.

== Career ==
He had solo exhibitions in many countries, in addition to participating in group shows.

=== Author ===
As of 2018 he had authored eighteen books, five on art (one in English), and eleven on politics. Monkeys' Right to Paint (published in Turkish and English), documents the plight of non-western artists and criticizes the western art establishment for its western-biased art history. Baykam wrote a controversial novel The Bone, published in December 2000. A turn of the Century novel it ranged through sex, death, philosophy of new sciences, technology and spying. The Bone was published in English in 2005.

Baykam published a two volume autobiography. In it he claims that as a child he was seen as "the creator of the 21st century school of art". Baykam claims that he was compared to artists like Klee, Matisse, Dufy, Saul and Steinberg. He refers to this book as "The most detailed autobiography ever written on earth" and compares himself to Mozart.

=== Artist ===
Baykam is a pioneer of the Neo-Expressionism movement and of multimedia and photo-painting political art. Beginning in the 1980s, he directed 16 mm short films and has acted in Turkish feature films.

=== Associations ===
He works with associations such as the Association for the Support of Contemporary Living and Atatürkist Thought Association. He is one of the founders of the UNESCO-AIAP-IAA International Association of artists Turkish National Committee. On 18 October, Baykam was elected as the World President of UNESCOIAA/AIAP.

=== Politician ===
Between 1995 and 1998, he was an elected member of the Party Assembly of the social-democratic Republican People's Party. Baykam was a candidate for the Presidency of this Party in October 2003. He is one of the most outspoken defenders of Kemalism.

=== Journalist ===
Baykam founded and directed the monthly art magazine Skala between 2000 and 2002. He writes for the daily Cumhuriyet, and art and political magazines. He frequently wrote for the left-wing Turkish Left. He heads the Patriotic Movement. He showed at Alphonse Berber Gallery and Broadway Gallery.

=== Film ===
Baykam is the founder of the film production and publishing company Piramid and Piramid Art Center, both based in Istanbul.

== See also ==
- World Art Day
