= Ali Şahin (politician, born 1921) =

Turkish politician

Member of the Grand National Assembly
- In office 27 October 1957 – 27 May 1960
- Constituency: Gaziantep (1957)

Personal details
- Born: 1921 Gaziantep, Turkey
- Died: 14 January 1972 (aged 50–51)
- Party: Democrat Party (DP)
- Children: 7
- Education: İstanbul University Faculty of Law

Ali Şahin (1921–1972) was a Turkish politician who served as a Member of Parliament for Gaziantep from Democrat Party (DP) between 1957–1960.
