= Onur Kumbaracıbaşı =

Turkish politician (1939–2022)

Minister of State
- In office 27 March 1995 – 5 October 1995
- Prime Minister: Tansu Çiller
- Preceded by: Mehmet Gülcegün

Minister of Public Works
- In office 21 November 1991 – 27 July 1994
- Prime Minister: Süleyman Demirel; Tansu Çiller
- Preceded by: Hüsamettin Örüç
- Succeeded by: Mustafa Yılmaz

Personal details
- Born: 1939 Ankara, Turkey
- Died: 15 February 2022 (aged 83) Ankara, Turkey
- Education: University of Vienna
- Occupation: Civil servant, politician
- Profession: Political scientist

Onur Kumbaracıbaşı (1939 – 15 February 2022) was a Turkish civil servant and politician who served as a government minister.

== Biography ==
Onur Kumbaracıbaşı was born to İbrahim and wife Mualla in Ankara, Turkey, in 1939. He studied in the Faculty of Political Sciences of University of Vienna. After obtaining his PhD degree in the same faculty, he returned to Turkey and served in the State Planning Organization. Then, he was appointed the Dean of Ankara Academy of Economic and Commercial Studies.

He joined the Social Democratic Populist Party. On 29 November 1987, he was elected into the 18th Parliament of Turkey as a deputy of Kocaeli Province. In the next term, he was elected a deputy from Hatay Province, and he participated in two coalition governments; the 49th and the 50th government of Turkey between 21 November 1991 and 27 July 1994 serving as the Minister of Public Works and Settlement. After his political party merged into the Republican People's Party, he also served as the Minister of State in the 50th government between 27 March 1995 and 5 October 1995.

Kumbaracıbaşı died from COVID-19 in Ankara on 15 February 2022, at the age of 83. Two days later, he was buried in Cebeci Asri Cemetery in Ankara.
