= Kemal Akkaya =

Computer scientist and IEEE Fellow

Kemal Akkaya is a computer scientist and academic who is a professor and chair of the Department of Computer Science at Virginia Commonwealth University (VCU). His research includes computer and network security, privacy, the Internet of things (IoT), cyber-physical systems, blockchain technology, digital forensics, and trustworthy artificial intelligence. In 2023, he was elevated to IEEE Fellow for contributions to routing and topology management in wireless ad hoc and sensor networks.

== Education ==
Akkaya earned a bachelor's degree in computer engineering and information sciences from Bilkent University in 1997 and a master's degree in computer engineering from Middle East Technical University in 1999. He received his Ph.D. in computer science from the University of Maryland, Baltimore County in 2005.

== Academic career ==
Following the completion of his doctorate, Akkaya joined the Department of Computer Science at Southern Illinois University Carbondale as an assistant professor in 2005. He became an associate professor there in 2011 and remained at the university until 2014.

Akkaya joined Florida International University (FIU) in 2014, initially as an associate professor of electrical and computer engineering. He became a professor in 2017 and later served as an Eminent Chaired Scholar Professor in FIU's Knight Foundation School of Computing and Information Sciences.

At FIU, he directed the Advanced Wireless and Security Laboratory and was involved in the establishment of Cybersecurity at FIU. In 2023, he was appointed co-director of FIU's Center for Integrated Security, Privacy and Trustworthy AI.

Akkaya also served as program director for FIU's bachelor's degree in the Internet of Things. The program, announced in 2017, was described as the first undergraduate IoT degree program in the United States. Akkaya participated in designing its curriculum, which combined hardware, software, communications, and cybersecurity.

In 2025, Akkaya joined VCU as professor and chair of its Department of Computer Science.

== Research ==
Akkaya's earlier research addressed routing, connectivity, node placement, and topology management in wireless ad hoc and sensor networks. This work formed the basis of his 2023 IEEE Fellow citation.

His subsequent research has included cybersecurity and privacy for IoT and cyber-physical systems, smart-grid communications, drone and vehicular networks, blockchain-based systems, post-quantum security, digital forensics, and trustworthy artificial intelligence.
