= Suphi Baykam =

Turkish politician and physician (1926–1996)

Personal details
- Born: 1926 Adana, Turkey
- Died: 21 June 1996 (aged 69–70)
- Party: Republican People's Party
- Spouse: Mutahhar Baykam
- Children: 2
- Education: Istanbul University
- Occupation: Physician

Suphi Baykam (1926–1996) was a Turkish physician and politician from the Republican People's Party (CHP). He served at the Parliament for three terms.

== Early life and education ==
He was born in Adana in 1926. His father worked as a teacher and then as a tax official.

He graduated from the School of Medicine, Istanbul University in 1950. He was also educated at Institute of Public Administration for Turkey and the Middle East in 1955 and at the Radiology Institute in 1956.

Baykam served as the president of the Turkish National Student Union between 1948 and 1950 while attending the School of Medicine. During his term the Union adopted a Kemalist approach unlike its previous ideology of nationalism.

== Career and activities ==
Baykam worked at the student dormitories until 1951 when he was dismissed by the Ministry of Education due to his criticisms against the ruling Democrat Party (DP). Then he left political activity and worked as a physician in Karaman. Following his return to Ankara in 1953 he began to work as a medical assistant at the School of Medicine of Ankara University. The same year he also joined the CHP. He became the first head of the youth branch of the CHP on 17 February 1954. He was dismissed from his assistantship when he was involved in the CHP's propaganda activities before the general election in 1954. The DP government also cancelled the three-year scholarship awarded by the World Health Organization to Baykam.

Baykam was elected as the head of the Ankara Medical Chamber in 1957. The same year he was elected as a deputy from his hometown for the CHP and served at the Parliament during the 11th term. He became a member of the CHP's council in the 14th congress on 12 January 1959. Following the military coup on 27 May 1960 a Constituent Assembly was formed. Baykam was a representative of the CHP at the Assembly.

Baykam was elected as a deputy from İstanbul in the elections of 1961 and 1965. During this period he was the vice general secretary of the CHP and a member of the left of center group. He was again elected as a member of the CHP's council in the congress held in October 1964.

While serving at the Parliament he developed the first law to improve Turkish cinema which is known as the Baykam Law Proposal. After the end of his term at the Parliament he retired from politics.

=== Views ===
For Baykam Kemalism was the opposite of wild capitalism, racism, communism, and reaction. He was instrumental in the development of the concepts such as Left of Center (Turkish: Ortanın Solu) and land reform (Turkish: Toprak Reformu) which were very crucial in the reorganization of the CHP.

== Personal life and death ==
Baykam married Mutahhar Baykam in 1952. She was an architect. They had two children, a daughter and a son, Bedri Baykam.

Baykam died on 21 June 1996.

=== Legacy ===
Alptekin Gündüz published a book in memory of Suphi Baykam in 2004.
