= Fikri Sağlar =

Turkish politician

Minister of Culture
- In office 1991–1994

Minister of Culture
- In office 1995–1996

Personal details
- Born: 1953 (age 72–73) Mut, Mersin
- Party: Social Democratic Populist Party, Republican People's Party, Social Democratic People's Party

Fikri Sağlar (born 1953) is a Turkish social democrat politician. He was Minister of Culture in the early 1990s, and a member of the parliamentary commission which investigated the Susurluk scandal. He has been a columnist for Birgün.

In 1983, he was elected deputy chairman of the Social Democratic Populist Party (SHP). The SHP merged with the Republican People's Party (CHP) in the 1990s. Sağlar was a minister both in the 50th and in the 52nd government of Turkey. In 2001 Sağlar resigned from the CHP along with several others, having been referred to a disciplinary board (which cleared him) for allegedly working against the CHP's interests. He co-founded the new Social Democratic People's Party in 2002, becoming its Secretary-General. In 2002, he was charged, along with some others, with insulting the government, due to some comments in a television discussion programme.

He is the author of two books, Code Name Susurluk and Contemporary Culture from National to the Global.
