= Ali Şahin (politician, born 1934) =

Turkish politician

Ali Şahin MP

Member of the Grand National Assembly
- In office 29 October 1987 – 20 October 1991
- Constituency: Kahramanmaraş (1987)
- In office 24 December 1995 – 18 April 1999
- Constituency: Kahramanmaraş (1995)

Personal details
- Born: 1934 (age 91–92) Andırın, Kahramanmaraş, Turkey
- Party: Social Democratic Populist Party (SHP); Republican People's Party (CHP)
- Children: 5
- Education: Ankara University Faculty of Law

Ali Şahin (born 1934) is a Turkish politician who served as a Member of Parliament for Kahramanmaraş from Social Democratic Populist Party (SHP) between 1987 and 1991, from Republican People's Party (CHP) between 1995 and 1999.
