= Şükrü Yürür =

Turkish politician (1944–2023)

Minister of Industry and Technology
- In office 21 December 1987 – 23 June 1991
- Preceded by: Cahit Aral
- Succeeded by: Rüştü Kazım Yücelen

Member of the Grand National Assembly
- In office 6 November 1983 – 18 November 2002
- Constituency: Ordu (1983, 1987, 1991, 1995, 1999)

Personal details
- Born: 1944 Ünye, Turkey
- Died: 7 December 2023 (aged 79) Ankara, Turkey
- Party: ANAP
- Education: Ankara Hacı Bayram Veli University
- Occupation: Economist

Şükrü Yürür (1944 – 7 December 2023) was a Turkish economist and politician. A member of the Motherland Party, he served as the Minister of Industry and Technology from 1987 to 1991 and was a deputy of the Grand National Assembly from 1983 to 2002.

Yürür died in Ankara on 7 December 2023, at the age of 79.
