= Yaşar Topçu =

Turkish politician (born 1941)

Minister of Public Works and Urban Planning
- In office June 30, 1997 – January 11, 1999
- Prime Minister: Mesut Yılmaz
- Preceded by: Cevat Ayhan
- Succeeded by: Ali Ilıksoy

Minister of Transport
- In office November 20, 1991 – June 25, 1993
- Prime Minister: Süleyman Demirel
- Preceded by: Sabahattin Yalınpala
- Succeeded by: Mehmet Köstepen

Personal details
- Born: January 10, 1941 (age 85) Boyabat, Sinop Province, Turkey
- Party: True Path Party (DYP); Motherland Party (ANAP); Democratic Party (DP)
- Education: Ankara University, Law School

Yaşar Topçu (born January 10, 1941, in Boyabat, Sinop Province, Turkey), is a Turkish politician and former government minister. He stood trial before the Constitutional Court for corruption charges, and was found guilty of malpractice.

== Early life ==
Yaşar Topçu was born to Ali Mahir Topçu and his wife Raviye in Boyabat town of Sinop Province, Turkey on January 10, 1941.

He was educated in Ankara University, Law School. After graduation he worked as a lawyer.

== Politics career ==
Yaşar Topçu entered politics joining the True Path Party (DYP) led by Süleyman Demirel. He was elected deputy of Sinop Province in the 1987 general election held on October 29. Following the 1991 general election held on October 20, he was appointed Minister of Transport in the coalition cabinet of Demirel. He served at this position between November 20, 1991, and June 25, 1993.

Topçu then joined the Motherland Party (ANAP) led by Mesut Yılmaz. He was re-elected in the 1995 general election on December 24. Topçu was appointed once again government minister in the coalition cabinet of Yılmaz. As Minister of Public Works and Urban Planning, he served from June 30, 1997, until January 11, 1999.

During his term of office, the main project he had dealt with was the construction of the Black Sea Coastal Road stretching all the way from west to Sarpi at the Turkish-Georgian border. Planned in the 1960s, the project was started only in 1987 by Prime minister Turgut Özal. However, its begin was dated 1988 with the opening of the border to Georgia. The project became soon suspended due to financial problems. It revived after the establishment of the Organization of the Black Sea Economic Cooperation in 1992. Prime minister Yılmaz, a native of Black Sea Region, tasked Topçu, also a Black Sea Region native, with the restage of the construction works, which were backed by foreign credits.

In the 1999 general election on April 18, he could secure his seat in the parliament for the fourth time.

As it became apparent that the tendering was not lawful, a parliamentary committee investigated the case. It concluded that Yaşar Topçu was involved in bid rigging on tender and abuse of office. The motion to send him before the Constitutional Court (Turkish: Yüce Divan) for trial was, however, was rejected in the parliament on June 29, 2000.

On January 6, 2004, a new parliamentary investigation committee was formed to reopen the case on allegations against Topçu. Worked between April 13 and October 27, 2004, it confirmed the findings of the former committee, and proposed to send Topçu before the Constitutional Court on charges of bid rigging. After the acceptance of the related motion in the parliament, the Constitutional Court tried Yaşar Topçu in time between November 11, 2004, and May 26, 2006. The supreme court found Topçu guilty of malpractice, not of bid rigging, for his conduct in the time from August 25 to September 19, 1997, in seven points related to the public tender for the construction of the Black Sea Coastal Road. However, he was freed of imprisonment in accordance with the applicable law, which allows the postponing of the court's final judgement.

Yaşar Topçu joined later the Democratic Party (DP), and temporarily served as the provincial leader of the party in his hometown.

Political offices
| Preceded by Cevat Ayhan | Minister of Public Works and Urban Planning; June 30, 1997 - January 11, 1999 | Succeeded by Ali Ilıksoy |
| Preceded by Sabahattin Yalınpala | Minister of Transport; November 20, 1991 - June 25, 1993 | Succeeded by Mehmet Köstepen |
