= 50th government of Turkey =

Government of the Republic of Turkey (1993-1995)

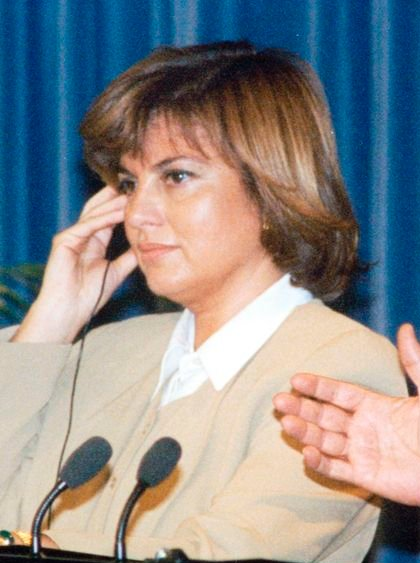
Tansu Çiller

The 50th government of Turkey (25 June 1993 – 5 October 1995) was a coalition government formed by True Path Party (DYP) and Social Democratic Populist Party (SHP).

== Background ==
The prime minister of the 49th government of Turkey was Süleyman Demirel of DYP. When Süleyman Demirel was elected as the president of Turkey, DYP elected Tansu Çiller as its new leader, and Tansu Çiller formed the 50th government of Turkey. She became the first (and so far, the only) female prime minister of Turkey. On the other hand, the deputy prime minister Erdal İnönü of SHP resigned from the leadership of his party and left his seat to Murat Karayalçın. In 1995, SHP and Republican People's Party (CHP) (which was previously issued from SHP) merged under the existing name of CHP, and Hikmet Çetin was elected as the temporary chairman of the party. Although the 50th government was basically the same government as the 49th, the change in leaders caused many later changes in the ministers, as is shown in the table below.

== The government ==
In the list below, the serving period of cabinet members who served only a part of the cabinet's lifespan are shown in the column "Notes".

| Title | Name | Party | Notes |
|---|---|---|---|
| Prime Minister | Tansu Çiller | DYP | |
| Deputy Prime Minister | Erdal İnönü; Murat Karayalçın; Hikmet Çetin | SHP; SHP; CHP | 25 June 1993 – 12 September 1993; 12 September 1993 – 27 March 1995; 27 March 1995 – 5 October 1995 |
Minister of State
| Minister of State | Necmettin Cevheri | DYP | |
| Minister of State | Yıldırım Aktuna | DYP | |
| Minister of State | Mehmet Gölhan; Mehmet Gazioğlu; Ali Şevki Erek | DYP | 25 June 1993 – 24 October 1993; 24 October 1993 – 28 November 1993; 28 November 1993 – 30 May 1995 |
| Minister of State | Bekir Sami Daçe | DYP | |
| Minister of State | Güneş Müftüoğlu; Nurhan Tekinel; Ayvaz Gökdemir | DYP | 25 June 1993 – 28 November 1993; 28 November 1993 – 14 August 1994; 14 August 1994 – 5 October 1995 |
| Minister of State | Nafiz Kurt | DYP | |
| Minister of State | Cemil Erhan; Aykon Doğan | DYP | 25 June 1993 – 7 February 1994; 7 February 1994 – 5 October 1995 |
| Minister of State | Mustafa Çiloğlu; Abdülbaki Ataç | DYP | 25 June 1993 – 28 November 1993; 28 November 1993 – 5 October 1995 |
| Minister of State | Ahmet Şanal; Mehmet Ali Yılmaz; Esat Kıratlıoğlu | DYP | 25 June 1993 – 28 November 1993; 28 November 1993 – 15 July 1994; 14 August 1994 – 5 October 1995 |
| Minister of State | Şükrü Erdem | DYP | |
| Minister of State | Bahattin Alagöz | SHP | 27 December 1994 – 27 October 1995 |
| Minister of State | İbrahim Tez; Fikri Sağlar; Mehmet Gülcegün; Onur Kumbaracıbaşı | SHP; SHP; SHP; CHP | 25 June 1993 – 27 July 1994; 27 July 1994 – 2 October 1994; 5 October 1994 – 27 March 1995; 27 March 1995 – 5 October 1995 |
| Minister of State | Türkan Akyol; Önay Alpago; Aysel Baykal | SHP; SHP; CHP | 25 June 1993 – 27 July 1994; 27 July 1994 – 27 March 1995; 27 March 1995 – 5 October 1995 |
| Minister of State | Mehmet Kahraman; Azimet Köylüoğlu; Algan Hacaloğlu | SHP; SHP; CHP | 25 June 1993 – 25 June 1994; 27 July 1994 – 27 March 1995; 27 March 1995 – 5 October 1995 |
| Minister of State | Erman Şahin; Salih Sümer; Ziya Halis | SHP; SHP; CHP | 25 June 1993 – 27 July 1994; 27 July 1994 – 27 March 1995; 27 March 1995 – 18 June 1995 |
| Minister of Justice | Seyfi Oktay; Mehmet Moğultay | SHP | 25 June 1993 – 27 July 1994; 27 July 1994 – 5 October 1995 |
| Minister of National Defense | Nevzat Ayaz; Mehmet Gölhan | DYP | 25 June 1993 – 24 October 1993; 24 October 1993 – 5 October 1995 |
| Minister of the Interior | Mehmet Gazioğlu; Nahit Menteşe | DYP | 25 June 1993 – 24 October 1993; 24 October 1993 – 5 October 1995 |
| Ministry of Foreign Affairs | Hikmet Çetin; Mümtaz Soysal; Murat Karayalçın; Erdal İnönü | SHP; SHP; SHP; CHP | 25 June 1993 – 27 July 1994; 27 July 1994 – 28 November 1994; 12 December 1994 – 27 March 1995; 27 March 1995 – 5 October 1995 |
| Minister of Finance and Customs | İsmet Atilla | DYP | |
| Ministry of National Education | Nahit Menteşe; Nevzat Ayaz | DYP | 25 June 1993 – 24 October 1993; 24 October 1993 – 5 October 1995 |
| Ministry of Public Works and Settlement | Onur Kumbaracıbaşı; Mustafa Yılmaz; Halil Çulhaoğlu; Erman Şahin; Halil Çulhaoğlu | SHP; SHP; SHP; CHP; CHP | 25 June 1993 – 27 July 1994; 27 July 1994 – 23 September 1994; 5 October 1994 – 27 March 1995; 27 March 1995 – 15 July 1995; 15 July 1995 – 5 October 1995 |
| Ministry of Health and Social Security | Rifat Serdaroğlu; Kazım Dinç; Doğan Baran | DYP | 25 June 1993 – 28 November 1993; 28 November 1993 – 14 August 1994; 14 August 1994 – 5 October 1995 |
| Ministry of Transport | Mehmet Köstepen; Ali Şevki Erek | DYP | 25 June 1993 – 12 April 1995; 29 May 1995 – 5 October 1995 |
| Ministry of Labour and Social Security | Mehmet Moğultay; Nihat Matkap; Aydın Güven Gürkan; Ziya Halis | SHP; SHP; CHP; CHP | 25 June 1993 – 27 July 1994; 27 July 1994 – 27 March 1995; 27 March 1995 – 4 June 1995; 18 June 1995 – 5 October 1995 |
| Ministry of Industry and Commerce | Tahir Köse; Mehmet Dönen; Hasan Akyol | SHP; SHP; CHP | 25 June 1993 – 27 July 1994; 27 July 1994 – 27 March 1995; 27 March 1995 – 5 October 1995 |
| Ministry of Culture | Fikri Sağlar; Timuçin Savaş; Ercan Karakaş; İsmail Cem | SHP; SHP; CHP; CHP | 25 June 1993 – 27 July 1994; 27 July 1994 – 27 March 1995; 27 March 1995 – 24 June 1995; 7 July 1995 – 5 October 1995 |
| Ministry of Tourism | Abdülkadir Ateş; Halil Çulhaoğlu; Şahin Ulusoy; İrfan Gürpınar | SHP; SHP; SHP; CHP | 25 June 1993 – 27 July 1994; 27 July 1994 – 5 October 1994; 5 October 1994 – 27 March 1995; 27 March 1995 – 5 October 1995 |
| Ministry of Energy and Natural Resources | Veysel Atasoy | DYP | |
| Ministry of Agriculture and Village Affairs | Rifaeddin Şahin | DYP | |
| Ministry of Forest | Hasan Ekinci | DYP | |
| Ministry of Environment | Rıza Akçalı | DYP | |

== Aftermath ==
In the first congress of CHP following the fusion on 9 September 1995, Deniz Baykal became the new leader of the party. After talks with Tansu Çiller, he decided to withdraw from the coalition.

| Preceded by 49th government of Turkey (Süleyman Demirel) | 50th Government of Turkey; 25 June 1993 – 05 October 1995 | Succeeded by 51st government of Turkey (Tansu Çiller) |
