= Cavit Çağlar =

Turkish politician

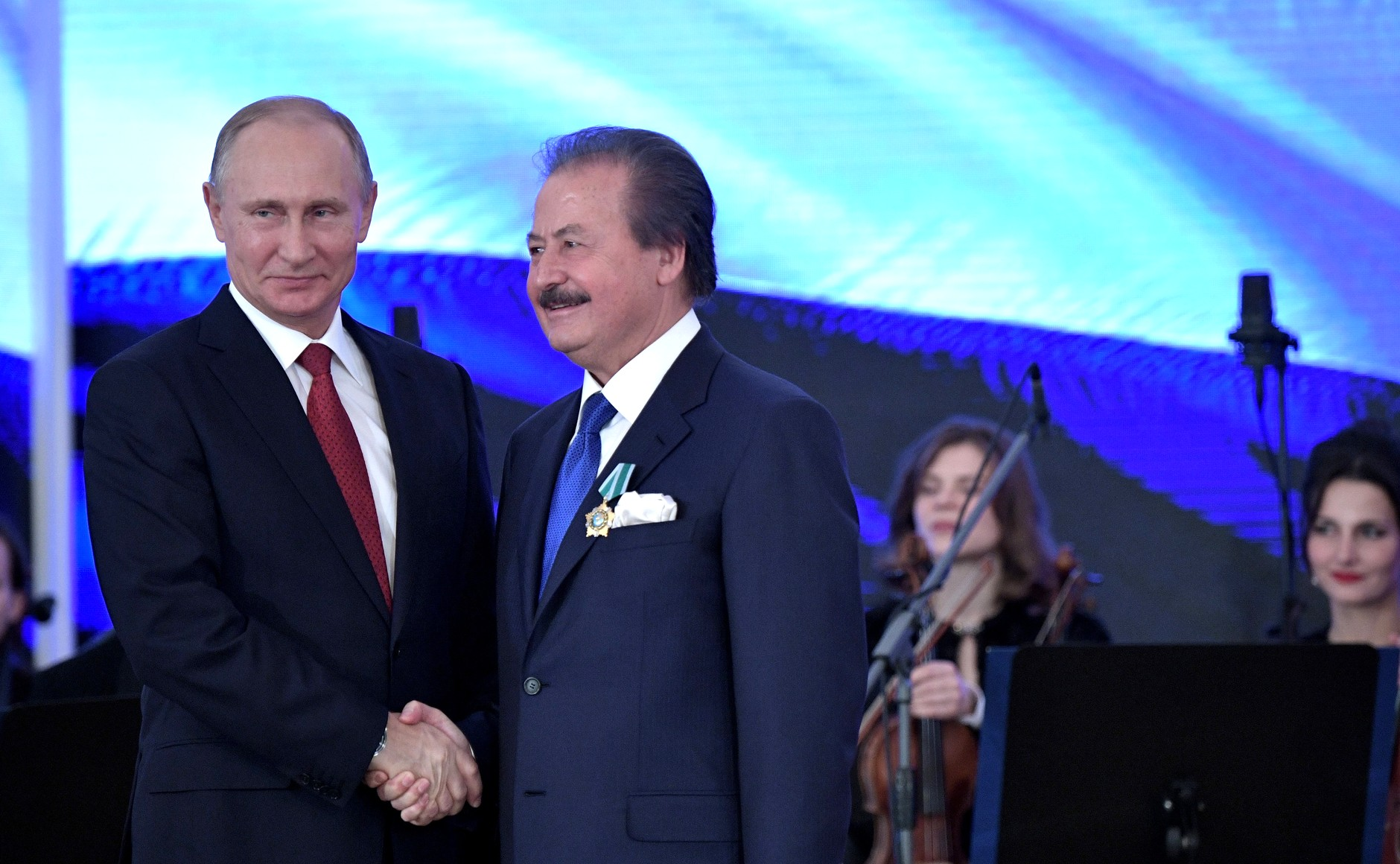
- Vladimir Putin and Cavit Çağlar (2017)

Minister of state
- In office 1991–1993

Personal details
- Born: 1944 (age 81–82) Komotini, Greece
- Party: True Path Party

Cavit Çağlar (born 1944, Komotini, Greece) is a Turkish businessman and politician and convicted felon. In 2004 he was sentenced to three years ten months for bank fraud, a $7.4m business bank loan for personal use, leading to the bankruptcy of İnterbank. He had been elected to the Grand National Assembly of Turkey (TBMM) for the True Path Party (DYP) in 1991, serving as a Minister of State responsible for state-owned banks (51st and 52nd government of Turkey). He resigned from the DYP in 1996, remaining in parliament as an independent until 1999. He had been a major financial contributor to the political comeback of President Süleyman Demirel.

== Early life ==
Çağlar was born in Komotini, Greece to ethnic Turks, moving to Turkey when he was still at school. He left school at age 15 when his father died to look after his family. He entered the textile business, joining his uncle, a textile merchant in Bursa. With his uncle's support and state loans, he built up a large industrial and trade group, Nergis Holding, which in 1996 had turnover of around $1bn and exports of around $200m. Based around textiles, by 1996 it also included major real estate investments (including in tourist facilities around the Sea of Marmara), and publishing and broadcasting ventures, including news channel NTV.

== Career ==
In 1996 Nergis acquired Çukurova Holding's majority stake in İnterbank. In December 1997 Etibank was privatised to Medya-Ipek Holding, co-owned by Çağlar and Dinç Bilgin, for $155m, and in September 1998 Çağlar was celebrating a $1bn investment in textile production with Demirel opening the new factories. In February 1998 police uncovered a plot to assassinate Çağlar by a group working for Alaattin Çakıcı, related to the bank privatization.

On 7 January 1999 İnterbank, then majority-owned by Nergis Holding, was transferred to the TMSF. It was later merged with Etibank, before being liquidated. Later in January, NTV was sold to the Dogus Group. In June 1999 prosecutors alleged that in 1998 Interbank had transferred over $650m to Nergis Holding companies – far in excess of legal limits for intra-group transfers. The total amount owed by Nergis to Interbank was said to be over $1.1bn. In January 2001 Turkey issued a warrant for his arrest, accusing Çağlar of using a $7.4m business bank loan for personal use. He was arrested in New York in April, and agreed to return to Turkey to face trial after a New York court denied a $5m bail application.

In 2004 Çağlar agreed to pay TMSF $1.6bn for debts relating to Interbank. When he failed to keep up payments, some of his other companies were seized, including his 50% stake in BİS Enerji, an electricity generating company in Bursa. Hotels, helicopters and media assets were also seized, and the Nergis Holding textile companies suffered financial difficulties, with 785 workers put on unpaid leave for over three months in 2008. Yeşim Tekstil was foreclosed by Halkbank in 2008 after debts reached $45m. In October 2008 Çağlar agreed to sell the remaining textile companies.

In 2004 Çağlar was sentenced to three years ten months for bank fraud relating to the bankruptcy of Interbank. He had initially been acquitted in 2002, but the government appealed.
