= Etibank =

Former Turkish bank

- Type: Bank
- Industry: Banking
- Founded: 14 June 1935
- Defunct: 5 April 2002
- Headquarters: Istanbul, Turkey
- Products: Financial services
- Parent: TMSF

Etibank A.Ş is a defunct Turkish bank. Founded in 1935 as a state bank focused on financing the electricity sector, it launched commercial banking activities in 1955. The commercial banking division was separated out in 1993 (from what would become Eti Mine Works), and privatised on 2 March 1998 to Medya İpek Holding A.Ş., co-owned by Cavit Çağlar and Dinç Bilgin, for $155m. The bank was sold to Bilgin's Medya Sabah Holding A.Ş. in 2000. It was taken over by the government's TMSF in October 2000, and Eskişehir Bankası T.A.Ş. and İnterbank A.Ş. merged into it on 2 July 2001. It was merged into the TSMF's Bayındırbank on 5 April 2002.

In 2011, Dinç Bilgin was sentenced to nearly five years in prison for financial irregularities relating to his ownership of Etibank. Others were also convicted for their roles.
