= Sümer Oral =

Turkish economist and politician (born 1938)

Minister of Finance
- In office 1991–1993
- Prime Minister: Süleyman Demirel

Minister of Social Security
- In office 12 November 1979 – 12 September 1980
- Prime Minister: Süleyman Demirel

Personal details
- Born: 27 February 1938 (age 88) İzmir, Turkey
- Children: 2
- Education: Istanbul University

Sümer Oral (born 27 February 1938) is a Turkish politician who served as the minister of social security and minister of finance and customs. He was also a member of the Parliament.

== Early life and education ==
Oral was born in İzmir on 27 February 1938. His father was Ahmet Nazif Oral.

Oral graduated from İzmir Atatürk High School in 1957 and obtained a degree in economics from Istanbul University in 1961. He attended a training program at l’OCDE in Paris between 1969 and 1970.

== Career ==
Oral started his career at the Finance Inspection Board of the Ministry of Finance on 20 July 1962. He was appointed general director of the budget and financial control division at the ministry in 1975. He retired from public service in 1977 and started his political career becoming a member of the Justice Party. He was elected as a deputy from Manisa in 1977. He was appointed minister of social security on 12 November 1979 which he held until the military coup on 12 September 1980.

Oral was elected as a deputy for the True Path Party representing again Manisa in the by-election held in 1986. He was also elected as a deputy from Manisa in the next general elections until 1999. He became a deputy from İzmir in the 1999 general elections. Oral was appointed minister of finance and customs in 1991 to cabinet led by Prime Minister Süleyman Demirel and remained in office until 1993. He joined the Nationalist Movement Party and was elected as a deputy for the party from Manisa in 2011.

== Personal life ==
Oral is married and has two children. He is fluent in French and published a book, Bir Devrin İzleri (Turkish: Traces of a Period), in 2021.
