= 17th Parliament of Turkey =

- 24 November 1983 – 16 October 1987
- MPs: 399

The 17th Grand National Assembly of Turkey existed from 6 November 1983 to 29 November 1987. Actually there is one other parliament between the 16th parliament of Turkey and the 17th parliament of Turkey. However, the members of the chamber of deputies in 1981-83 term were appointed members rather than elected members and usually chamber of deputies is not included in the list of the parliaments in Turkey. There were 399 MPs in the parliament . Motherland Party (ANAP) held the majority. Populist Party (HP) and Nationalist Democracy Party (MDP) were the other parties. The parties of pre 1980 era were closed by the military rule of Coup d'état . (Some later on were refounded.)

== Main parliamentary milestones ==
Some of the important events in the history of the parliament are the following:

- 4 December 1983 – Necmettin Karaduman was elected as the speaker of the Turkish parliament
- 13 December 1984 – Turgut Özal formed the 45th government of Turkey
- 2 November 1985 – SODEP and HP two parties sharing the same background were merged. The new party was named Social Democratic Peoples Party (SHP)
- 4 May 1986 – MDP dissolved itself
- 9 May 1986 – Free Democratic Party was founded by Mehmet Yazar
- 28 November 1986 – Free Democratic Party merged to ANAP
- 6 September 1987 – Referendum on the political rights of the pre-1980 politicians (ANAP campaigned for the rejection) It was accepted by a very narrow margin
- 29 November 1987 – General election

Preceded by Advisory Parliament of Turkey (Note: Including MGK period)	17th Parliament of Turkey; Necmettin Karaduman; 6 November 1983 – 29 November 1987	Succeeded by 18th Parliament of Turkey
