= 20th Parliament of Turkey =

20th - Parliament of Turkey
- 8 January 1996 – 25 March 1999
- MPs: 550
- Election: December 1995

This is a list of the 550 Members of Parliament elected in the 1995 general election held in Turkey. The MPs are listed by province. Turkey uses a D'Hondt proportional representative system to elect Members of Parliament. These MPs formed the 20th Parliament of Turkey. An overview of the parliamentary composition is shown in the table below.

Party	Members	Change	Proportion	Parliament	Provinces
Welfare Party	158	▲96	28.7%		
True Path Party	135	▼43	24.5%		
Motherland Party	132	▲17	24.0%		
Democratic Left Party	76	▲69	13.8%		
Republican People's Party	49	▼39	8.9%		
Total	550		100%		

== Adana ==
Members	Party
Cevdet Akçalı	Welfare Party
Uğur Aksöz	Motherland Party
İmren Aykut	Motherland Party
İbrahim Yavuz Bildik	Democratic Left Party
Mehmet Ali Bilici	Motherland Party
Yakup Budak	Welfare Party
Mehmet Büyükyılmaz	Democratic Left Party
Sıtkı Cengil	Welfare Party
İbrahim Cevher Cevheri	True Path Party
Erol Çevikçe	Republican People's Party
Mehmet Halit Dağlı	True Path Party
Veli Andaç Durak	True Path Party
Tuncay Karaytuğ	Democratic Left Party
Orhan Kavuncu	Motherland Party
Mustafa Küpeli	True Path Party
Arif Sezer	Democratic Left Party
İbrahim Ertan Yülek	Welfare Party

== Adıyaman ==
Members	Party
Mahmut Nedim Bilgiç	True Path Party
Mahmut Bozkurt	Motherland Party
Ahmet Çelik	Welfare Party
Ahmet Doğan	Welfare Party
Celal Topkan	Republican People's Party

== Afyon ==
Members	Party
Sait Açba	Welfare Party
İsmet Attila	True Path Party
Osman Hazer	Welfare Party
Halil İbrahim Özsoy	Motherland Party
Yaman Törüner	True Path Party
Kubilay Uygun	Democratic Left Party
Nuri Yabuz	True Path Party

== Ağrı ==
Members	Party
Sıddık Altay	Welfare Party
Cemil Erhan	True Path Party
Yaşar Eryılmaz	Motherland Party
Celal Esin	Welfare Party
Mehmet Ziyattin Tokar	Welfare Party

== Aksaray ==
Members	Party
Mehmet Altınsoy	Welfare Party
Nevzat Köse	True Path Party
Murtaza Özkanlı	Welfare Party
Sadi Somuncuoğlu	Motherland Party

== Amasya ==
Members	Party
Aslan Ali Hatipoğlu	Motherland Party
Ahmet İyimaya	True Path Party
Cemalettin Lafçı	Welfare Party
Haydar Oymak	Republican People's Party

== Ankara ==
Members	Party
İlhan Aküzüm	True Path Party
Nejat Arseven	Motherland Party
Yılmaz Ateş	Republican People's Party
Saffet Arıkan Bedük	True Path Party
Ahmet Bilge	Welfare Party
Hasan Hüseyin Ceylan	Welfare Party
Gökhan Çapoğlu	Democratic Left Party
Cemil Çiçek	Motherland Party
Ali Dinçer	Republican People's Party
Mehmet Ekici	Motherland Party
Ömer Faruk Ekinci	Welfare Party
Eşref Erdem	Republican People's Party
Ünal Erkan	True Path Party
Mehmet Gölhan	True Path Party
Agah Oktay Güner	Motherland Party
Uluç Gürkan	Democratic Left Party
Şaban Karataş	Welfare Party
İrfan Köksalan	Motherland Party
Seyfi Oktay	Republican People's Party
Mehmet Sağdıç	Motherland Party
Önder Sav	Republican People's Party
Yücel Seçkiner	Motherland Party
Ahmet Tekdal	Welfare Party
İlker Tuncay	Motherland Party
Aydın Tümen	Democratic Left Party
Rıza Ulucak	Welfare Party
Hikmet Uluğbay	Democratic Left Party
Ersönmez Yarbay	Welfare Party

== Antalya ==
Members	Party
Arif Ahmet Denizolgun	Welfare Party
İbrahim Gürdal	Motherland Party
Sami Küçükbaşkan	Motherland Party
Osman Berberoğlu	True Path Party
Hayri Doğan	True Path Party
Emre Gönensay	True Path Party
Metin Şahin	Democratic Left Party
Deniz Baykal	Republican People's Party
Bekir Kumbul	Republican People's Party
Yusuf Öztop	Republican People's Party

== Ardahan ==
Members	Party
Saffet Kaya	True Path Party
İsmet Atalay	Republican People's Party

== Artvin ==
Members	Party
Süleyman Hatinoğlu	Motherland Party
Hasan Ekinci	True Path Party
Metin Arifağaoğlu	Republican People's Party

== Aydın ==
Members	Party
Muhammet Polat	Welfare Party
Cengiz Altınkaya	Motherland Party
Yüksel Yalova	Motherland Party
Ali Rıza Gönül	True Path Party
Nahit Menteşe	True Path Party
İsmet Sezgin	True Path Party
Sema Pişkinsüt	Democratic Left Party
Fatih Atay	Republican People's Party

== Balıkesir ==
Members	Party
İsmail Özgün	Welfare Party
Safa Giray	Motherland Party
Hüsnü Sıvalıoğlu	Motherland Party
Abdülbaki Ataç	True Path Party
Ahmet Bilgiç	True Path Party
İlyas Yılmazyıldız	True Path Party
Tamer Kanber	Democratic Left Party
Mustafa Güven Karahan	Democratic Left Party
İsmet Önder Kırlı	Republican People's Party

== Bartın ==
Members	Party
Zeki Çakan	Motherland Party
Köksal Toptan	True Path Party
Cafer Tufan Yazıcıoğlu	Democratic Left Party

== Batman ==
Members	Party
Alaattin Sever Aydın	Welfare Party
Musa Okcu	Welfare Party
Ataullah Hamidi	Motherland Party
Faris Özdemir	True Path Party

== Bayburt ==
Members	Party
Suat Pamukçu	Welfare Party
Ülkü Gökalp Güney	Motherland Party

== Bilecik ==
Members	Party
Şerif Çim	Democratic Left Party
Bahattin Şeker	True Path Party

== Bingöl ==
Members	Party
Kazım Ataoğlu	Welfare Party
Hüsamettin Korkutata	Welfare Party
Mahmut Sönmez	Welfare Party

== Bitlis ==
Members	Party
Zeki Ergezen	Welfare Party
Edip Safder Gaydalı	True Path Party
Kamran İnan	Motherland Party
Abdulhaluk Mutlu	Welfare Party

== Bolu ==
Members	Party
Avni Akyol	Motherland Party
Feti Görür	Welfare Party
Necmi Hoşver	True Path Party
Abbas İnceayan	Motherland Party
Mustafa Karslıoğlu	Democratic Left Party
Mustafa Yünlüoğlu	Welfare Party

== Burdur ==
Members	Party
Mustafa Çiloğlu	True Path Party
Yusuf Ekinci	Motherland Party
Kazım Üstüner	Democratic Left Party

== Bursa ==
Members	Party
Yüksel Aksu	Democratic Left Party
Ali Rahmi Beyreli	Democratic Left Party
Abdülkadir Cenkçiler	True Path Party
Cavit Çağlar	True Path Party
Mehmet Altan Karapaşaoğlu	Welfare Party
İlhan Kesici	Motherland Party
Hayati Korkmaz	Democratic Left Party
Cemal Külahlı	Welfare Party
Feridun Pehlevan	Motherland Party
Ali Osman Sönmez	True Path Party
Yahya Şimşek	Republican People's Party
Turhan Tayan	True Path Party
Ertuğrul Yalçınbayır	Welfare Party
İbrahim Yazıcı	Motherland Party

== Çanakkale ==
Members	Party
Hikmet Aydın	Democratic Left Party
Mustafa Cumhur Ersümer	Motherland Party
Ahmet Küçük	Republican People's Party
Nevfel Şahin	True Path Party
Ahmet Hamdi Üçpınarlar	True Path Party

== Çankırı ==
Members	Party
Mete Bülgün	Motherland Party
Ahmet Uyanık	True Path Party
İsmail Coşar	Welfare Party

== Çorum ==
Members	Party
Bekir Aksoy	True Path Party
Mehmet Aykaç	Welfare Party
Hasan Çağlayan	Motherland Party
Zülfikar Gazi	Welfare Party
Yasin Hatiboğlu	Welfare Party
Ali Haydar Şahin	Republican People's Party

== Denizli ==
Members	Party
Mustafa Kemal Aykurt	True Path Party
Hilmi Develi	Democratic Left Party
Mehmet Gözlükaya	True Path Party
Adnan Keskin	Republican People's Party
Hasan Korkmazcan	Motherland Party
Mustafa Haluk Müftüler	True Path Party
Ramazan Yenidede	Welfare Party

== Diyarbakır ==
Members	Party
Abdülkadir Aksu	Motherland Party
Muzaffer Arslan	Motherland Party
Ferit Bora	Welfare Party
Mehmet Selim Ensarioğlu	True Path Party
Sacit Günbey	Welfare Party
Seyyit Haşim Haşimi	Welfare Party
Ömer Vehbi Hatipoğlu	Welfare Party
Yakup Hatipoğlu	Welfare Party
Sebğatullah Seydaoğlu	Motherland Party
Salih Sümer	True Path Party

== Edirne ==
Members	Party
Ümran Akkan	True Path Party
Evren Bulut	True Path Party
Mustafa İlimen	Democratic Left Party
Erdal Kesebir	Democratic Left Party

== Elazığ ==
Members	Party
Mehmet Kemal Ağar	True Path Party
Ömer Naimi Barım	Welfare Party
Hasan Belhan	Welfare Party
Mustafa Cihan Paçacı	True Path Party
Ahmet Cemil Tunç	Welfare Party

== Erzincan ==
Members	Party
Tevhit Karakaya	Welfare Party
Mustafa Kul	Republican People's Party
Naci Terzi	Welfare Party
Mustafa Yıldız	Republican People's Party

== Erzurum ==
Members	Party
Zeki Ertugay	True Path Party
Lütfü Esengün	Welfare Party
Abdulilah Fırat	Welfare Party
Necati Güllülü	Motherland Party
İsmail Köse	True Path Party
Ömer Özyılmaz	Welfare Party
Aslan Polat	Welfare Party
Şinasi Yavuz	Welfare Party

== Eskişehir ==
Members	Party
Necati Albay	Democratic Left Party
Mustafa Balcılar	Motherland Party
Demir Berberoğlu	True Path Party
İbrahim Yaşar Dedelek	True Path Party
Hanifi Demirkol	Welfare Party
Mahmut Erdir	Democratic Left Party

== Gaziantep ==
Members	Party
Nurettin Aktaş	Welfare Party
Mehmet Batallı	True Path Party
Hikmet Çetin	Republican People's Party
Kahraman Emmioğlu	Welfare Party
Ali Ilıksoy	Democratic Left Party
Mehmet Bedri İncetahtacı	Welfare Party
Mustafa Rüştü Taşar	Motherland Party
Ünal Yaşar	Motherland Party
Mustafa Yılmaz	Democratic Left Party

== Giresun ==
Members	Party
Turhan Alçelik	Welfare Party
Burhan Kara	Motherland Party
Yavuz Köymen	Motherland Party
Ergun Özdemir	True Path Party
Rasim Zaimoğlu	Motherland Party

== Gümüşhane ==
Members	Party
Lütfi Doğan	Welfare Party
Mahmut Oltan Sungurlu	Motherland Party

== Hakkari ==
Members	Party
Naim Geylani	Motherland Party
Mustafa Zeydan	True Path Party

== Hatay ==
Members	Party
Abdulkadir Akgöl	True Path Party
Fuat Çay	Republican People's Party
Ali Günay	Democratic Left Party
Süleyman Metin Kalkan	Welfare Party
Nihad Matkap	Republican People's Party
Levent Mıstıkoğlu	Motherland Party
Ömer Atilla Sav	Republican People's Party
Mehmet Sılay	Welfare Party
Ali Uyar	Independent
Hüseyin Yayla	Motherland Party

== Iğdır ==
Members	Party
Adil Aşırım	Democratic Left Party
Şamil Ayrım	True Path Party

== Isparta ==
Members	Party
Ömer Bilgin	True Path Party
Abdullah Aykon Doğan	True Path Party
Mustafa Köylü	Welfare Party
Erkan Mumcu	Motherland Party
Halil Yıldız	True Path Party

== İstanbul ==
Members	Party
Azmi Ateş	Welfare Party
Mustafa Baş	Welfare Party
Mukadder Başeğmez	Welfare Party
Gürcan Dağdaş	Welfare Party
Süleyman Arif Emre	Welfare Party
Ekrem Erdem	Welfare Party
Mehmet Fuat Fırat	Welfare Party
Metin Işık	Welfare Party
İsmail Kahraman	Welfare Party
Hüseyin Kansu	Welfare Party
Göksal Küçükali	Welfare Party
Aydın Menderes	Welfare Party
Ali Oğuz	Welfare Party
Mehmet Ali Şahin	Welfare Party
Osman Yumakoğulları	Welfare Party
Bahri Zengin	Welfare Party
Bülent Akarcalı	Motherland Party
Abdul Ahat Andican	Motherland Party
Refik Aras	Motherland Party
Ali Coşkun	Motherland Party
Hüseyin Hüsnü Doğan	Motherland Party
Halit Dumankaya	Motherland Party
Yılmaz Karakoyunlu	Motherland Party
Mehmet Cavit Kavak	Motherland Party
Emin Kul	Motherland Party
Yusuf Namoğlu	Motherland Party
Korkut Özal	Motherland Party
Ali Talip Özdemir	Motherland Party
Yusuf Pamuk	Motherland Party
Güneş Taner	Motherland Party
Şadan Tuzcu	Motherland Party
Meral Akşener	True Path Party
Yıldırım Aktuna	True Path Party
Sedat Aloğlu	True Path Party
Tayyar Altıkulaç	True Path Party
Tansu Çiller	True Path Party
Hasan Tekin Enerem	True Path Party
Cefi Kamhi	True Path Party
Hayri Kozakçıoğlu	True Path Party
Necdet Menzir	True Path Party
Bahattin Yücel	True Path Party
Namık Kemal Zeybek	True Path Party
Ahmet Ziya Aktaş	Democratic Left Party
Mehmet Aydın	Democratic Left Party
Nami Çağan	Democratic Left Party
Bülent Ecevit	Democratic Left Party
Osman Kılıç	Democratic Left Party
Tahir Köse	Democratic Left Party
Cevdet Selvi	Democratic Left Party
Ahmet Tan	Democratic Left Party
Bülent Tanla	Democratic Left Party
Zekeriya Temizel	Democratic Left Party
Erdoğan Toprak	Democratic Left Party
Hüsamettin Özkan	Democratic Left Party
Algan Hacaloğlu	Republican People's Party
Ercan Karakaş	Republican People's Party
Ahmet Güryüz Ketenci	Republican People's Party
Mehmet Moğultay	Republican People's Party
Altan Öymen	Republican People's Party
Mehmet Sevigen	Republican People's Party
Ali Topuz	Republican People's Party

== İzmir ==
Members	Party
Sabri Tekir	Welfare Party
İsmail Yılmaz	Welfare Party
Işın Çelebi	Motherland Party
Kaya Erdem	Motherland Party
Rüşdü Saraçoğlu	Motherland Party
Suha Tanık	Motherland Party
Metin Öney	Motherland Party
Turan Arınç	True Path Party
Hasan Denizkurdu	True Path Party
Gencay Gürün	True Path Party
Mehmet Köstepen	True Path Party
Işılay Saygın	True Path Party
Rifat Serdaroğlu	True Path Party
Ufuk Söylemez	True Path Party
Veli Aksoy	Democratic Left Party
Şükrü Sina Gürel	Democratic Left Party
Atilla Mutman	Democratic Left Party
Ahmet Piriştina	Democratic Left Party
Hakan Tartan	Democratic Left Party
Zerrin Yeniceli	Democratic Left Party
Ali Rıza Bodur	Republican People's Party
Sabri Ergül	Republican People's Party
Aydın Güven Gürkan	Republican People's Party
Birgen Keleş	Republican People's Party

== Kahramanmaraş ==
Members	Party
Esat Bütün	Motherland Party
Hasan Dikici	Welfare Party
Ali Doğan	Motherland Party
Avni Doğan	Welfare Party
Ahmet Dökülmez	Welfare Party
Mustafa Kamalak	Welfare Party
Mehmet Sağlam	True Path Party
Ali Şahin	Republican People's Party

== Karabük ==
Members	Party
Şinasi Altıner	True Path Party
Hayrettin Dilekcan	Welfare Party
Erol Karan	Democratic Left Party

== Karaman ==
Members	Party
Abdullah Özbey	Welfare Party
Zeki Ünal	Welfare Party
Fikret Ünlü	Democratic Left Party

== Kars ==
Members	Party
Yusuf Selahattin Beyribey	Motherland Party
Çetin Bilgir	Democratic Left Party
Mehmet Sabri Güner	True Path Party
Zeki Karabayır	Welfare Party

== Kastamonu ==
Members	Party
Fethi Acar	Welfare Party
Murat Başesgioğlu	Motherland Party
Muharrem Hadi Dilekci	Democratic Left Party
Nurhan Tekinel	True Path Party
Haluk Yıldız	True Path Party

== Kayseri ==
Members	Party
Memduh Büyükkılıç	Welfare Party
İsmail Cem	Democratic Left Party
Osman Çilsal	True Path Party
Ayvaz Gökdemir	True Path Party
Abdullah Gül	Welfare Party
Nurettin Kaldırımcı	Welfare Party
Salih Kapusuz	Welfare Party
Recep Kırış	Motherland Party
İbrahim Yılmaz	Motherland Party

== Kırıkkale ==
Members	Party
Kemal Albayrak	Welfare Party
Hacı Filiz	True Path Party
Mikail Korkmaz	Welfare Party
Recep Mızrak	Motherland Party

== Kırklareli ==
Members	Party
İrfan Gürpınar	Republican People's Party
Ahmet Sezal Özbek	True Path Party
Cemal Özbilen	Motherland Party
Necdet Tekin	Democratic Left Party

== Kırşehir ==
Members	Party
Mehmet Ali Altın	Motherland Party
Ömer Demir	Motherland Party
Cafer Güneş	Welfare Party

== Kilis ==
Members	Party
Mustafa Kemal Ateş	Welfare Party
Doğan Güreş	True Path Party

== Kocaeli ==
Members	Party
Necati Çelik	Welfare Party
Şevket Kazan	Welfare Party
Osman Pepe	Welfare Party
Bülent Atasayan	Motherland Party
Hayrettin Uzun	Motherland Party
İsmail Kalkandelen	True Path Party
Halil Çalık	Democratic Left Party
Bekir Yurdagül	Democratic Left Party
Onur Kumbaracıbaşı	Republican People's Party

== Konya ==
Members	Party
Hüseyin Arı	Welfare Party
Veysel Candan	Welfare Party
Remzi Çetin	Welfare Party
Necmettin Erbakan	Welfare Party
Abdullah Gencer	Welfare Party
Lütfi Yalman	Welfare Party
Mustafa Ünaldı	Welfare Party
Hasan Hüseyin Öz	Welfare Party
Teoman Rıza Güneri	Welfare Party
Ahmet Alkan	Motherland Party
Mehmet Keçeciler	Motherland Party
Mehmet Necati Çetinkaya	True Path Party
Ali Günaydın	True Path Party
Mehmet Ali Yavuz	True Path Party
Abdullah Turan Bilge	Democratic Left Party
Nezir Büyükcengiz	Republican People's Party

== Kütahya ==
Members	Party
Ahmet Derin	Welfare Party
Mustafa Kalemli	Motherland Party
Emin Karaa	Democratic Left Party
İsmail Karakuyu	True Path Party
Mehmet Korkmaz	Demokratik Türkiye Partisi
Metin Perli	Welfare Party

== Malatya ==
Members	Party
Miraç Akdoğan	Motherland Party
Oğuzhan Asiltürk	Welfare Party
Yaşar Canbay	Welfare Party
Metin Emiroğlu	Motherland Party
Ayhan Fırat	Republican People's Party
Fikret Karabekmez	Welfare Party
Mehmet Recai Kutan	Welfare Party

== Manisa ==
Members	Party
Rıza Akçalı	True Path Party
Bülent Arınç	Welfare Party
Tevfik Diker	True Path Party
Hatice Ayseli Göksoy	True Path Party
Hasan Gülay	Democratic Left Party
Sümer Oral	Motherland Party
Ekrem Pakdemirli	Motherland Party
Yahya Uslu	True Path Party
Mustafa Cihan Yazar	Democratic Left Party
Mustafa Erdoğan Yetenç	Republican People's Party

== Mardin ==
Members	Party
Fehim Adak	Welfare Party
Muzaffer Arıkan	True Path Party
Süleyman Çelebi	Motherland Party
Mahmut Duyan	True Path Party
Ömer Ertaş	Motherland Party
Hüseyin Yıldız	Welfare Party

== Mersin ==
Members	Party
Oya Araslı	Republican People's Party
Yusuf Fevzi Arıcı	True Path Party
Mehmet Emin Aydınbaş	Welfare Party
Saffet Benli	Welfare Party
Halil Cin	Motherland Party
Ali Er	Motherland Party
Abdulbaki Gökçel	Democratic Left Party
Turhan Güven	True Path Party
Durmuş Fikri Sağlar	Republican People's Party
Mustafa İstemihan Talay	Democratic Left Party
Ayfer Yılmaz	True Path Party
Rüştü Kazım Yücelen	Motherland Party

== Muğla ==
Members	Party
İrfettin Akar	True Path Party
Lale Aytaman	Motherland Party
Zeki Çakıroğlu	Republican People's Party
Mustafa Dedeoğlu	True Path Party
Enis Yalım Erez	True Path Party
Fikret Uzunhasan	Democratic Left Party

== Muş ==
Members	Party
Necmettin Dede	True Path Party
Nedim İlci	Welfare Party
Erkan Kemaloğlu	Motherland Party
Sabahattin Yıldız	Welfare Party

== Nevşehir ==
Members	Party
Abdulkadir Baş	Motherland Party
Mehmet Elkatmış	Welfare Party
Ahmet Esat Kıratlıoğlu	True Path Party

== Niğde ==
Members	Party
Doğan Baran	True Path Party
Akın Gönen	Motherland Party
Mehmet Salih Katırcıoğlu	Welfare Party
Ergun Özkan	True Path Party

== Ordu ==
Members	Party
Hüseyin Olgun Akın	Welfare Party
İhsan Çabuk	Democratic Left Party
Mustafa Bahri Kibar	Motherland Party
Müjdat Koç	Democratic Left Party
Mustafa Hasan Öz	Welfare Party
Nabi Poyraz	Motherland Party
Refaiddin Şahin	True Path Party
Şükrü Yürür	Motherland Party

== Rize ==
Members	Party
Hüseyin Avni Kabaoğlu	Motherland Party
Ahmet Kabil	Motherland Party
Ahmet Mesut Yılmaz	Motherland Party
Şevki Yılmaz	Welfare Party

== Sakarya ==
Members	Party
Mehmet Teoman Akgür	Democratic Left Party
Nezir Aydın	Welfare Party
Cevat Ayhan	Welfare Party
Nevzat Ercan	True Path Party
Ertuğrul Eryılmaz	True Path Party
Ahmet Neidim	Motherland Party
Ersin Taranoğlu	Motherland Party

== Samsun ==
İsim	Parti
Ahmet Demircan	Welfare Party
Latif Öztek	Welfare Party
Musa Uzunkaya	Welfare Party
Adem Yıldız	Motherland Party
Biltekin Özdemir	Motherland Party
Cemal Alişan	Motherland Party
İrfan Demiralp	True Path Party
Nafiz Kurt	True Path Party
Ayhan Gürel	Democratic Left Party
Yalçın Gürtan	Democratic Left Party
Murat Karayalçın	Republican People's Party

== Siirt ==
Members	Party
Ahmet Nurettin Aydın	Welfare Party
Mehmet Emin Aydın	Welfare Party
Nizamettin Sevgili	Motherland Party

== Sinop ==
Members	Party
Kadir Bozkurt	True Path Party
Yaşar Topçu	Motherland Party
Metin Bostancıoğlu	Democratic Left Party

== Sivas ==
Members	Party
Musa Demirci	Welfare Party
Tahsin Irmak	True Path Party
Mahmut Işık	Republican People's Party
Temel Karamollaoğlu	Welfare Party
Abdüllatif Şener	Welfare Party
Nevzat Yanmaz	Motherland Party
Muhsin Yazıcıoğlu	Motherland Party

== Şanlıurfa ==
Members	Party
Sedat Edip Bucak	True Path Party
Necmettin Cevheri	True Path Party
İbrahim Halil Çelik	Welfare Party
Seyit Eyyüpoğlu	Motherland Party
Eyyüp Cenap Gülpınar	Motherland Party
Zülfükar İzol	Welfare Party
Ahmet Karavar	Welfare Party
Abdulkadir Öncel	Welfare Party
Mehmet Fevzi Şıhanlıoğlu	True Path Party

== Şırnak ==
Members	Party
Bayar Ökten	True Path Party
Mehmet Tatar	True Path Party
Mehmet Salih Yıldırım	Motherland Party

== Tekirdağ ==
Members	Party
Fevzi Aytekin	Democratic Left Party
Bayram Fırat Dayanıklı	Democratic Left Party
Nihan İlgün	True Path Party
Hasan Peker	True Path Party
Enis Sülün	Motherland Party

== Tokat ==
Members	Party
Abdullah Arslan	Welfare Party
Hanefi Çelik	Motherland Party
Ali Şevki Erek	True Path Party
Metin Gürdere	Motherland Party
Ahmet Feyzi İnceöz	Welfare Party
Bekir Sobacı	Welfare Party
Şahin Ulusoy	Republican People's Party

== Trabzon ==
Members	Party
Kemalettin Göktaş	Welfare Party
Şeref Malkoç	Welfare Party
İsmail İlhan Sungur	Welfare Party
Eyüp Aşık	Motherland Party
Ali Kemal Başaran	Motherland Party
İbrahim Çebi	Motherland Party
Yusuf Bahadır	True Path Party
Hikmet Sami Türk	Democratic Left Party

== Tunceli ==
Members	Party
Kamer Genç	True Path Party
Orhan Veli Yıldırım	Republican People's Party

== Uşak ==
Members	Party
Yıldırım Aktürk	Motherland Party
Hasan Karakaya	True Path Party
Mehmet Yaşar Ünal	Democratic Left Party

== Van ==
Members	Party
Maliki Ejder Arvas	Welfare Party
Fethullah Erbaş	Welfare Party
Şaban Sevli	Welfare Party
Mustafa Bayram	Motherland Party
Şerif Bedirhanoğlu	Motherland Party
Mahmut Yılbaş	True Path Party

== Yalova ==
Members	Party
Yaşar Okuyan	Motherland Party
Cevdet Aydın	True Path Party

== Yozgat ==
Members	Party
Kazım Arslan	Welfare Party
İlyas Arslan	Welfare Party
Abdullah Örnek	Welfare Party
Lütfullah Kayalar	Motherland Party
İsmail Durak Ünlü	Motherland Party
Yusuf Bacanlı	True Path Party

== Zonguldak ==
Members	Party
Necmettin Aydın	Welfare Party
Veysel Atasoy	Motherland Party
Ömer Barutçu	True Path Party
Tahsin Boray Baycık	Democratic Left Party
Hasan Gemici	Democratic Left Party
Mümtaz Soysal	Democratic Left Party
