= 21st Parliament of Turkey =

- 2 May 1999 – 1 October 2002
- MPs: 550
- Election: April 1999

This is a list of the 550 Members of Parliament elected in the 1999 general election held in Turkey. The MPs are listed by province. Turkey uses a D'Hondt proportional representative system to elect Members of Parliament. These MPs formed the 21st Parliament of Turkey. An overview of the parliamentary composition is shown in the table below.

Party	Members	Change	Proportion	Parliament	Provinces
Democratic Left Party	136	▲60	24.7%		
Nationalist Movement Party	129	▲129	23.5%		
Virtue Party	111	▲111	20.2%		
Motherland Party	86	▼46	15.6%		
True Path Party	85	▼50	15.5%		
Independents	3	▲3	0.5%		
Total	550		100%		

== Adana ==
Member	Party
Mehmet Ali Bilici	Motherland Party
Musa Öztürk	Motherland Party
Ali Tekin	Democratic Left Party
Arif Sezer	Democratic Left Party
İbrahim Yavuz Bildik	Democratic Left Party
İsmet Vursavuş	Democratic Left Party
Tayyibe Gülek	Democratic Left Party
Mehmet Halit Dağlı	True Path Party
Ali Gören	Virtue Party
Yakup Budak	Virtue Party
Adnan Fatin Özdemir	Nationalist Movement Party
Recai Yıldırım	Nationalist Movement Party
Ali Halaman	Nationalist Movement Party
Mehmet Metanet Çulhaoğlu	Nationalist Movement Party

== Adıyaman ==
Member	Party
Mahmut Bozkurt	Motherland Party
Mahmut Nedim Bilgiç	True Path Party
Dengir Mir Mehmet Fırat	Virtue Party
Mahmut Göksu	Virtue Party
Mehmet Özyol	Virtue Party
Hasari Güler	Nationalist Movement Party

== Afyon ==
Member	Party
Halil İbrahim Özsoy	Motherland Party
Gaffar Yakın	Democratic Left Party
İsmet Attila	True Path Party
Sait Açba	Virtue Party
Abdülkadir Akcan	Nationalist Movement Party
Mehmet Telek	Nationalist Movement Party
Müjdat Karayerli	Nationalist Movement Party

== Ağrı ==
Member	Party
Yaşar Eryılmaz	Motherland Party
Musa Konyar	True Path Party
Celal Esin	Virtue Party
Nidai Seven	Nationalist Movement Party

== Aksaray ==
Member	Party
Murat Akın	True Path Party
Ramazan Toprak	Virtue Party
Kürşat Eser	Nationalist Movement Party
Sadi Somuncuoğlu	Nationalist Movement Party

== Amasya ==
Member	Party
Gönül Saray Alphan	Democratic Left Party
Ahmet İyimaya	True Path Party
Akif Gülle	Virtue Party
Adanan Uçaş	Nationalist Movement Party

== Ankara ==
Member	Party
Birkan Erdal	Motherland Party
Nejat Arseven	Motherland Party
Yıldırım Akbulut	Motherland Party
Yücel Seçkiner	Motherland Party
Aydın Tümen	Democratic Left Party
Ayşe Gürocak	Democratic Left Party
Esvet Özdoğu	Democratic Left Party
Halis Uluç Gürkan	Democratic Left Party
Hikmet Uluğbay	Democratic Left Party
Hüseyin Tayfun İçli	Democratic Left Party
Melda Bayer	Democratic Left Party
Mehmet Zeki Sezer	Democratic Left Party
Oğuz Aygün	Democratic Left Party
Mustafa Cihan Paçacı	True Path Party
Saffet Arıkan Bedük	True Path Party
Cemil Çiçek	Virtue Party
Eyyüp Sanay	Virtue Party
Mehmet Zeki Çelik	Virtue Party
Oya Akgönenç Muğisuddin	Virtue Party
Rıza Ulucak	Virtue Party
Abdurrahman Küçük	Nationalist Movement Party
Ali Işıklar	Nationalist Movement Party
Hayrettin Özdemir	Nationalist Movement Party
Koray Aydın	Nationalist Movement Party
Mehmet Arslan	Nationalist Movement Party
Sedat Çevik	Nationalist Movement Party
Şefkat Çetin	Nationalist Movement Party
Şevket Bülend Yahnici	Nationalist Movement Party

== Antalya ==
Member	Party
Cengiz Aydoğan	Motherland Party
İbrahim Gürdal	Motherland Party
Ahmet Sancar Sayın	Democratic Left Party
Metin Şahin	Democratic Left Party
Mustafa Vural	Democratic Left Party
Kemal Çelik	True Path Party
Mehmet Baysarı	True Path Party
Salih Çelen	True Path Party
Mehmet Zeki Okudan	Virtue Party
Nesrin Ünal	Nationalist Movement Party
Osman Müderrisoğlu	Nationalist Movement Party
Tunca Toskay	Nationalist Movement Party

== Ardahan ==
Member	Party
Faruk Demir	Democratic Left Party
Saffet Kaya	True Path Party

== Artvin ==
Member	Party
Ergün Bayrak	Democratic Left Party
Hasan Ekinci	True Path Party

== Aydın ==
Member	Party
Cengiz Altınkaya	Motherland Party
Yüksel Yalova	Motherland Party
Ertuğrul Kumcuoğlu	Democratic Left Party
Sema Pişkinsüt	Democratic Left Party
Halit Dikmen	Democratic Left Party
Ali Rıza Gönül	True Path Party
Ali Uzunırmak	Nationalist Movement Party
Bekir Ongun	Nationalist Movement Party

== Balıkesir ==
Member	Party
Agah Oktay Güner	Motherland Party
Mustafa Güven Karahan	Democratic Left Party
Numan Gültekin	Democratic Left Party
Tamer Kanber	Democratic Left Party
İlhan Aytekin	True Path Party
İlyas Yılmazyıldız	True Path Party
İsmail Özgün	Virtue Party
Aydın Gökmen	Nationalist Movement Party
Hüseyin Kalkan	Nationalist Movement Party

== Bartın ==
Member	Party
Zeki Çakan	Motherland Party
Cafer Tufan Yazıcıoğlu	Democratic Left Party

== Batman ==
Member	Party
Ataullah Hamidi	Motherland Party
Burhan İsen	True Path Party
Faris Özdemir	True Path Party
Alaattin Sever Aydın	Virtue Party

== Bayburt ==
Member	Party
Suat Pamukçu	Virtue Party
Şaban Kardeş	Nationalist Movement Party

== Bilecik ==
Member	Party
Sebahat Vardar	Democratic Left Party
Hüseyin Arabacı	Nationalist Movement Party

== Bingöl ==
Member	Party
Necati Yöndar	True Path Party
Hüsamettin Korkutata	Virtue Party
Mahfuz Güler	Virtue Party

== Bitlis ==
Member	Party
Edip Safder Gaydalı	Motherland Party
Yahya Çevik	True Path Party
Zeki Ergezen	Virtue Party
İbrahim Halil Oral	Nationalist Movement Party

== Bolu ==
Member	Party
Avni Akyol	Motherland Party
Mustafa Karslıoğlu	Democratic Left Party
Necmi Hoşver	True Path Party
İsmail Alptekin	Virtue Party
Ersoy Özcan	Nationalist Movement Party

== Burdur ==
Member	Party
Hasan Macit	Democratic Left Party
Mustafa Örs	True Path Party
Süleyman Coşkuner	Nationalist Movement Party

== Bursa ==
Member	Party
Kenan Sönmez	Motherland Party
Turhan Tayan	Motherland Party
Ali Arabacı	Democratic Left Party
Fahrettin Gülener	Democratic Left Party
Ali Rahmi Beyreli	Democratic Left Party
Hayati Korkmaz	Democratic Left Party
Orhan Ocak	Democratic Left Party
Recep Önal	Democratic Left Party
Oğuz Tezmen	True Path Party
Teoman Özalp	True Path Party
Ahmet Sünnetçioğlu	Virtue Party
Ertuğrul Yalçınbayır	Virtue Party
Faruk Çelik	Virtue Party
Mehmet Altan Karapaşaoğlu	Virtue Party
Burhan Orhan	Nationalist Movement Party
Orhan Şen	Nationalist Movement Party

== Çanakkale ==
Member	Party
Mustafa Cumhur Ersümer	Motherland Party
Sadık Kırbaş	Democratic Left Party
Nevfel Şahin	True Path Party
Sıtkı Turan	Nationalist Movement Party

== Çankırı ==
Member	Party
Hüseyin Karagöz	Virtue Party
Hakkı Duran	Nationalist Movement Party
İrfan Keleş	Nationalist Movement Party

== Çorum ==
Member	Party
Bekir Aksoy	True Path Party
Yasin Hatiboğlu	Virtue Party
Abdulhaluk Mehmet Çay	Nationalist Movement Party
Melek Karaca	Nationalist Movement Party
Vahit Kayrıcı	Nationalist Movement Party

== Denizli ==
Member	Party
Beyhan Aslan	Motherland Party
Hasan Erçelebi	Democratic Left Party
Mehmet Kocabatmaz	Democratic Left Party
Mehmet Gözlükaya	True Path Party
Mustafa Kemal Aykurt	True Path Party
Ali Keskin	Nationalist Movement Party
Salih Erbeyin	Nationalist Movement Party

== Diyarbakır ==
Member	Party
Abdulbaki Erdoğmuş	Motherland Party
Nurettin Dilek	Motherland Party
Sebğatullah Seydaoğlu	Motherland Party
Abdulsamet Turgut	Democratic Left Party
Mehmet Selim Ensarioğlu	True Path Party
Nurettin Atik	True Path Party
Salih Sümer	True Path Party
Osman Aslan	Virtue Party
Ömer Vehbi Hatipoğlu	Virtue Party
Sacit Günbey	Virtue Party
Seyyit Haşim Haşimi	Virtue Party

== Edirne ==
Member	Party
Evren Bulut	Motherland Party
Ali Ahmet Ertürk	Democratic Left Party
Mustafa İlimen	Democratic Left Party
Şadan Şimşek	Democratic Left Party

== Elazığ ==
Member	Party
Mehmet Kemal Ağar	Independent
Ali Rıza Septioğlu	True Path Party
Ahmet Cemil Tunç	Virtue Party
Latif Öztek	Virtue Party
Mustafa Gül	Nationalist Movement Party

== Erzincan ==
Member	Party
Sebahattin Karakelle	True Path Party
Tevhit Karakaya	Virtue Party
Mihrali Aksu	Nationalist Movement Party

== Erzurum ==
Member	Party
Ayvaz Gökdemir	True Path Party
Zeki Ertugay	True Path Party
Aslan Polat	Virtue Party
Fahrettin Kukaracı	Virtue Party
Lütfü Esengün	Virtue Party
Cezmi Polat	Nationalist Movement Party
İsmail Köse	Nationalist Movement Party
Mücahit Himoğlu	Nationalist Movement Party

== Eskişehir ==
Member	Party
İbrahim Yaşar Dedelek	Motherland Party
Mahmut Erdir	Democratic Left Party
Mehmet Mail Büyükerman	Democratic Left Party
Necati Albay	Democratic Left Party
Mehmet Sadri Yıldırım	True Path Party
Süleyman Servet Sazak	Nationalist Movement Party

== Gaziantep ==
Member	Party
Mustafa Rüştü Taşar	Motherland Party
Ali Ilıksoy	Democratic Left Party
Mustafa Yılmaz	Democratic Left Party
İbrahim Konukoğlu	True Path Party
Mehmet Bedri İncetahtacı	Virtue Party
Nurettin Aktaş	Virtue Party
Ali Özdemir	Nationalist Movement Party
Mehmet Ay	Nationalist Movement Party
Mehmet Hanifi Tiryaki	Nationalist Movement Party

== Giresun ==
Member	Party
Burhan Kara	Motherland Party
Hasan Akgün	Democratic Left Party
Rasim Zaimoğlu	True Path Party
Turhan Alçelik	Virtue Party
Mustafa Yaman	Nationalist Movement Party

== Gümüşhane ==
Member	Party
Lütfi Doğan	Virtue Party
Bedri Yaşar	Nationalist Movement Party

== Hakkari ==
Member	Party
Mecit Piruzbeyoğlu	Motherland Party
Hakki Töre	True Path Party
Evliya Parlak	Virtue Party

== Hatay ==
Member	Party
Hakkı Oğuz Aykut	Motherland Party
Levent Mıstıkoğlu	Motherland Party
Ali Günay	Democratic Left Party
Namık Kemal Atahan	Democratic Left Party
Mehmet Dönen	True Path Party
Mustafa Geçer	Virtue Party
Süleyman Metin Kalkan	Virtue Party
Mehmet Nuri Tarhan	Nationalist Movement Party
Mehmet Şandır	Nationalist Movement Party
Süleyman Turan Çirkin	Nationalist Movement Party

== Iğdır ==
Member	Party
Ali Güner	Virtue Party
Abbas Bozyel	Nationalist Movement Party

== Isparta ==
Member	Party
Erkan Mumcu	Motherland Party
Ramazan Gül	True Path Party
Mustafa Zorlu	Nationalist Movement Party
Osman Gazi Aksoy	Nationalist Movement Party

== İstanbul ==
Member	Party
Abdul Ahat Andican	Motherland Party
Ali Emre Kocaoğlu	Motherland Party
Aydın Ağan Ayaydın	Motherland Party
Bülent Akarcalı	Motherland Party
Ediz Hun	Motherland Party
Güneş Taner	Motherland Party
İsmail Sühan Özkan	Motherland Party
Mehmet Ali İrtemçelik	Motherland Party
Mehmet Cavit Kavak	Motherland Party
Nesrin Nas	Motherland Party
Sadettin Tantan	Motherland Party
Şadan Tuzcu	Motherland Party
Şamil Ayrım	Motherland Party
Yılmaz Karakoyunlu	Motherland Party
Ahmet Güzel	Democratic Left Party
Ahmet Tan	Democratic Left Party
Ahmet Ziya Aktaş	Democratic Left Party
Bahri Sipahi	Democratic Left Party
Bülent Ersin Gök	Democratic Left Party
Cahit Savaş Yazıcı	Democratic Left Party
Erdoğan Toprak	Democratic Left Party
Erol Al	Democratic Left Party
Fadlı Ağaoğlu	Democratic Left Party
Hasan Hüsamettin Özkan	Democratic Left Party
Hüseyin Mert	Democratic Left Party
İbrahim Nami Çağan	Democratic Left Party
İsmail Aydınlı	Democratic Left Party
Masum Türker	Democratic Left Party
Mehmet Tahir Köse	Democratic Left Party
Mustafa Bülent Ecevit	Democratic Left Party
Mustafa Düz	Democratic Left Party
Nazire Karakuş	Democratic Left Party
Necdet Saruhan	Democratic Left Party
Osman Kılıç	Democratic Left Party
Perihan Yılmaz	Democratic Left Party
Rıdvan Budak	Democratic Left Party
Sulhiye Serbest	Democratic Left Party
Süleyman Yağız	Democratic Left Party
Yücel Erdener	Democratic Left Party
Zafer Güler	Democratic Left Party
Celal Adan	True Path Party
Hayri Kozakçıoğlu	True Path Party
Tansu Çiller	True Path Party
Abdülkadir Aksu	Virtue Party
İrfan Gündüz	Virtue Party
Mehmet Fuat Fırat	Virtue Party
Mehmet Gül	Nationalist Movement Party
Bozkurt Yaşar Öztürk	Nationalist Movement Party
Mehmet Pak	Nationalist Movement Party
Hüseyin Kansu	Virtue Party
Azmi Ateş	Virtue Party
Nazif Okumuş	Nationalist Movement Party
Mustafa Murat Sökmenoğlu	Nationalist Movement Party
Mehmet Ali Şahin	Virtue Party
Ahmet Çakar	Nationalist Movement Party
Mustafa Baş	Virtue Party
Mukadder Başeğmez	Virtue Party
Süleyman Arif Emre	Virtue Party
Aydın Menderes	Virtue Party
Ali Coşkun	Virtue Party
Mustafa Verkaya	Nationalist Movement Party
Esat Öz	Nationalist Movement Party
Nevzat Yalçıntaş	Virtue Party
Ayşe Nazlı Ilıcak	Virtue Party
İsmail Kahraman	Virtue Party
Osman Yumakoğulları	Virtue Party
Bahri Zengin	Virtue Party

== İzmir ==
Member	Party
Güler Aslan	Democratic Left Party
Saffet Başaran	Democratic Left Party
Burhan Bıçakçıoğlu	Democratic Left Party
Burhan Suat Çağlayan	Democratic Left Party
Işın Çelebi	Motherland Party
Mehmet Çümen	Democratic Left Party
Salih Dayıoğlu	Democratic Left Party
Hayri Diri	Democratic Left Party
Şükrü Sina Gürel	Democratic Left Party
Yusuf Kırkpınar	Nationalist Movement Party
Hasan Metin	Democratic Left Party
Atilla Mutman	Democratic Left Party
Sümer Oral	Motherland Party
Mehmet Özcan	Democratic Left Party
Işılay Saygın	Motherland Party
Rifat Serdaroğlu	Motherland Party
Rahmi Sezgin	Democratic Left Party
Hasan Ufuk Söylemez	True Path Party
Suha Tanık	Motherland Party
Ahmet Kenan Tanrıkulu	Nationalist Movement Party
Hakan Tartan	Democratic Left Party
Yıldırım Ulupınar	True Path Party
Kemal Vatan	Democratic Left Party
Oktay Vural	Nationalist Movement Party

== Kahramanmaraş ==
Member	Party
Ali Doğan	Motherland Party
Avni Doğan	Virtue Party
Mustafa Kamalak	Virtue Party
Mehmet Kaya	Nationalist Movement Party
Metin Kocabaş	True Path Party
Edip Özbaş	Nationalist Movement Party
Mehmet Sağlam	True Path Party
Ali Sezal	Virtue Party
Nevzat Taner	Nationalist Movement Party

== Karabük ==
Member	Party
Mustafa Eren	True Path Party
Erol Karan	Democratic Left Party
İlhami Yılmaz	Nationalist Movement Party

== Karaman ==
Member	Party
Fikret Ünlü	Democratic Left Party
Zeki Ünal	Virtue Party
Hasan Çalış	Nationalist Movement Party

== Kars ==
Member	Party
Çetin Bilgir	Democratic Left Party
İlhan Aküzüm	Motherland Party
Arslan Aydar	Nationalist Movement Party

== Kastamonu ==
Member	Party
Murat Başesgioğlu	Motherland Party
Muharrem Hadi Dilekci	Democratic Left Party
Mehmet Serdaroğlu	Nationalist Movement Party
Nurhan Tekinel	True Path Party

== Kayseri ==
Member	Party
Hamdi Baktır	Nationalist Movement Party
İsmail Cem	Democratic Left Party
Sabahattin Çakmakoğlu	Nationalist Movement Party
Sevgi Esen	True Path Party
Abdullah Gül	Virtue Party
Salih Kapusuz	Virtue Party
Hasan Basri Üstünbaş	Nationalist Movement Party
Sadık Yakut	Nationalist Movement Party

== Kırıkkale ==
Member	Party
Kemal Albayrak	Virtue Party
Osman Durmuş	Nationalist Movement Party
Hacı Filiz	True Path Party
Nihat Gökbulut	Motherland Party

== Kırklareli ==
Member	Party
Cemal Özbilen	Motherland Party
Nural Karagöz	Democratic Left Party
Necdet Tekin	Democratic Left Party

== Kırşehir ==
Member	Party
Mustafa Haykır	Motherland Party
Ramazan Mirzaoğlu	Nationalist Movement Party
Fikret Tecer	Democratic Left Party

== Kilis ==
Member	Party
Doğan Güreş	True Path Party
Mehmet Nacar	Nationalist Movement Party

== Kocaeli ==
Member	Party
Meral Akşener	True Path Party
Ahmet Arkan	Democratic Left Party
Mehmet Batuk	Virtue Party
Halil Çalık	Democratic Left Party
Cumali Durmuş	Nationalist Movement Party
Sefer Ekşi	Motherland Party
Mehmet Vecdi Gönül	Virtue Party
Muhammet Turhan İmamoğlu	Democratic Left Party
Kemal Köse	Nationalist Movement Party
Osman Pepe	Virtue Party

== Konya ==
Member	Party
Hüseyin Arı	Virtue Party
Faruk Bal	Nationalist Movement Party
Abdullah Turan Bilge	Democratic Left Party
Veysel Candan	Virtue Party
Remzi Çetin	Virtue Party
Ali Gebeş	Nationalist Movement Party
Mehmet Gölhan	True Path Party
Mustafa Sait Gönen	Nationalist Movement Party
Teoman Rıza Güneri	Virtue Party
Mehmet Emrehan Halıcı	Democratic Left Party
Ömer İzgi	Nationalist Movement Party
Hasan Kaya	Nationalist Movement Party
Mehmet Keçeciler	Motherland Party
Özkan Öksüz	Virtue Party
Lütfi Yalman	Virtue Party
Mehmet Ali Yavuz	True Path Party

== Kütahya ==
Member	Party
Cevdet Akçalı	True Path Party
İsmail Karakuyu	True Path Party
Emin Karaa	Democratic Left Party
Ahmet Derin	Virtue Party
Kadir Görmez	Nationalist Movement Party
Seydi Karakuş	Nationalist Movement Party

== Malatya ==
Member	Party
Miraç Akdoğan	Motherland Party
Tevfik Ahmet Özal	Independent
Mehmet Recai Kutan	Virtue Party
Oğuzhan Asiltürk	Virtue Party
Yaşar Canbay	Virtue Party
Basri Coşkun	Nationalist Movement Party
Namık Hakan Durhan	Nationalist Movement Party

== Manisa ==
Member	Party
Ekrem Pakdemirli	Motherland Party
Hasan Gülay	Democratic Left Party
İsmail Bozdağ	Democratic Left Party
Mustafa Cihan Yazar	Democratic Left Party
Mehmet Necati Çetinkaya	True Path Party
Rıza Akçalı	True Path Party
Bülent Arınç	Virtue Party
Ali Serdengeçti	Nationalist Movement Party
Hüseyin Akgül	Nationalist Movement Party
Mustafa Enöz	Nationalist Movement Party

== Mardin ==
Member	Party
Ömer Ertaş	Motherland Party
Süleyman Çelebi	Motherland Party
Mustafa Kemal Tuğmaner	Democratic Left Party
Metin Musaoğlu	True Path Party
Veysi Şahin	True Path Party
Fehim Adak	Virtue Party

== Mersin ==
Member	Party
Ali Er	Motherland Party
Rüştü Kazım Yücelen	Motherland Party
Ayfer Yılmaz	True Path Party
Turhan Güven	True Path Party
Akif Serin	Democratic Left Party
Edip Özgenç	Democratic Left Party
Mustafa İstemihan Talay	Democratic Left Party
Ali Güngör	Nationalist Movement Party
Cahit Tekelioğlu	Nationalist Movement Party
Enis Öksüz	Nationalist Movement Party
Hidayet Kılınç	Nationalist Movement Party
Yalçın Kaya	Nationalist Movement Party

== Muğla ==
Member	Party
Hasan Özyer	Motherland Party
Fikret Uzunhasan	Democratic Left Party
Nazif Topaloğlu	Democratic Left Party
Tunay Dikmen	Democratic Left Party
İbrahim Yazıcı	True Path Party
Metin Ergun	Nationalist Movement Party

== Muş ==
Member	Party
Erkan Kemaloğlu	Motherland Party
Zeki Eker	Democratic Left Party
Mümtaz Yavuz	True Path Party
Sabahattin Yıldız	Virtue Party

== Nevşehir ==
Member	Party
Mehmet Elkatmış	Virtue Party
İsmail Çevik	Nationalist Movement Party
Mükremin Taşkın	Nationalist Movement Party

== Niğde ==
Member	Party
Eyüp Doğanlar	Democratic Left Party
Doğan Baran	True Path Party
Mükerrem Levent	Nationalist Movement Party

== Ordu ==
Member	Party
Sefer Koçak	Motherland Party
Şükrü Yürür	Motherland Party
Hasan Fehmi Konyalı	Democratic Left Party
İhsan Çabuk	Democratic Left Party
Yener Yıldırım	True Path Party
Eyüp Fatsa	Virtue Party
Cemal Enginyurt	Nationalist Movement Party

== Osmaniye ==
Member	Party
Şükrü Ünal	Virtue Party
Birol Büyüköztürk	Nationalist Movement Party
Devlet Bahçeli	Nationalist Movement Party
Mehmet Kundakcı	Nationalist Movement Party

== Rize ==
Member	Party
Ahmet Kabil	Motherland Party
Ahmet Mesut Yılmaz	Motherland Party
Mehmet Bekaroğlu	Virtue Party

== Sakarya ==
Member	Party
Ersin Taranoğlu	Anavatan Partisi
Şaban Ramis Savaş	Democratic Left Party
Nevzat Ercan	True Path Party
Cevat Ayhan	Virtue Party
Nezir Aydın	Virtue Party
Osman Fevzi Zihnioğlu	Nationalist Movement Party

== Samsun ==
Member	Party
Mehmet Çakar	Motherland Party
Şenel Kapıcı	Democratic Left Party
Tarık Cengiz	Democratic Left Party
Yekta Açıkgöz	Democratic Left Party
Erdoğan Sezgin	True Path Party
Kemal Kabataş	True Path Party
Ahmet Demircan	Virtue Party
Musa Uzunkaya	Virtue Party
Ahmet Aydın	Nationalist Movement Party
Vedat Çınaroğlu	Nationalist Movement Party

== Siirt ==
Member	Party
Nizamettin Sevgili	Motherland Party
Takiddin Yarayan	True Path Party
Ahmet Nurettin Aydın	Virtue Party

== Sinop ==
Member	Party
Yaşar Topçu	Motherland Party
Metin Bostancıoğlu	Democratic Left Party
Kadir Bozkurt	True Path Party

== Sivas ==
Member	Party
Mehmet Cengiz Güleç	Democratic Left Party
Abdüllatif Şener	Virtue Party
Musa Demirci	Virtue Party
Temel Karamollaoğlu	Virtue Party
Hüsnü Yusuf Gökalp	Nationalist Movement Party
Mehmet Ceylan	Nationalist Movement Party

== Şanlıurfa ==
Member	Party
Eyyüp Cenap Gülpınar	Motherland Party
Mehmet Güneş	Motherland Party
Mehmet Fevzi Şıhanlıoğlu	True Path Party
Mehmet Yalçınkaya	True Path Party
Necmettin Cevheri	True Path Party
Sedat Edip Bucak	True Path Party
Ahmet Karavar	Virtue Party
Yahya Akman	Virtue Party
Zülfükar İzol	Virtue Party
Mustafa Niyazi Yanmaz	Virtue Party
Muzaffer Çakmaklı	Nationalist Movement Party

== Şırnak ==
Member	Party
Mehmet Salih Yıldırım	Motherland Party
Mehmet Sait Değer	True Path Party
Abdullah Veli Seyda	Virtue Party

== Tekirdağ ==
Member	Party
Enis Sülün	Motherland Party
Nihan İlgün	True Path Party
Fevzi Aytekin	Democratic Left Party
Bayram Fırat Dayanıklı	Democratic Left Party
Ahmet Zamantılı	Democratic Left Party

== Tokat ==
Member	Party
Ali Şevki Erek	True Path Party
Bekir Sobacı	Virtue Party
Mehmet Ergün Dağcıoğlu	Virtue Party
Hasan Hüseyin Balak	Nationalist Movement Party
Lutfi Ceylan	Nationalist Movement Party
Reşat Doğru	Nationalist Movement Party

== Trabzon ==
Member	Party
Ali Kemal Başaran	Motherland Party
Eyüp Aşık	Motherland Party
Hikmet Sami Türk	Democratic Left Party
Ali Naci Tuncer	True Path Party
Şeref Malkoç	Virtue Party
Nail Çelebi	Nationalist Movement Party
Orhan Bıçakçıoğlu	Nationalist Movement Party

== Tunceli ==
Member	Party
Bekir Gündoğan	Independent
Kamer Genç	True Path Party

== Uşak ==
Member	Party
Hasan Özgöbek	Democratic Left Party
Mehmet Yaşar Ünal	Democratic Left Party
Armağan Yılmaz	Nationalist Movement Party

== Van ==
Member	Party
Kamran İnan	Motherland Party
Fetullah Gültepe	True Path Party
Hüseyin Çelik	True Path Party
Fethullah Erbaş	Virtue Party
Maliki Ejder Arvas	Virtue Party
Mustafa Bayram	Virtue Party
Ayhan Çevik	Nationalist Movement Party

== Yalova ==
Member	Party
Yaşar Okuyan	Motherland Party
Hasan Suna	Democratic Left Party

== Yozgat ==
Member	Party
Lütfullah Kayalar	Motherland Party
İlyas Arslan	Virtue Party
Mehmet Çiçek	Virtue Party
Ahmet Erol Ersoy	Nationalist Movement Party
Mesut Türker	Nationalist Movement Party
Şuayip Üşenmez	Nationalist Movement Party

== Zonguldak ==
Member	Party
Veysel Atasoy	Motherland Party
Hasan Gemici	Democratic Left Party
Ömer Üstünkol	Democratic Left Party
Tahsin Baysık	Democratic Left Party
Ömer Barutçu	True Path Party
İsmail Cerrahoğlu	Nationalist Movement Party
