= 53rd government of Turkey =

Government of the Republic of Turkey (1996)

The 53rd government of Turkey (6 March 1996 – 28 June 1996), known as "ANAYOL" or "Second Mesut Yılmaz government," was a coalition government formed by the True Path Party (DYP) and Motherland Party (ANAP). It was the first rotation government to be formed outside of Israel.

== Background ==
In the elections held on 24 December 1995, five parties entered the parliament with no party holding the majority. The coalition talks continued for more than two months, and finally, two parties, the Motherland Party (ANAP) and True Path Party (DYP), agreed to form the coalition. Although their total number of seats in the parliament (268 out of 550) was still less than 50%, the Democratic Left Party (DSP) promised to support the government during the voting of confidence without participating in the government. According to the agreement, the DYP would receive more seats in the cabinet, and the premiership would be rotated between the parties on a yearly basis: ANAP would hold it in 1996 and 1999, while the DYP would do so in 1997, 1998 and 2000.

== The government ==
In the list below, the serving period of cabinet members who served only a part of the cabinet's lifespan are shown in the column "Notes".

Title	Name	Party	Notes
Prime Minister	Mesut Yılmaz	ANAP	
Deputy Prime Minister	Nahit Menteşe	DYP	
Minister of State
Minister of State	Rüştü Saracoğlu	ANAP	
Minister of State	Ayfer Yılmaz	DYP	
Minister of State	Abdülkadir Aksu	ANAP	
Minister of State	Ufuk Söylemez	DYP	
Minister of State	Eyüp Aşık	ANAP	
Minister of State	Yaman Törüner	DYP	
Minister of State	İmren Aykut	ANAP	
Minister of State	Ayvaz Gökdemir	DYP	6 March 1995 – 25 May 1996
Minister of State	Cemil Çiçek	ANAP	
Minister of State	Yaşar Dedelek	DYP	
Minister of State	Ali Talip Özdemir	ANAP	
Minister of State	Ünal Erkan	DYP	6 March 1996 – 25 May 1996
Minister of State	Ersin Taranoğlu	ANAP	
Minister of State	Mehmet Halit Dağlı	DYP	
Ministry of Justice	Mehmet Ağar	DYP	
Ministry of National Defense	Oltan Sungurlu	ANAP	
Ministry of the Interior	Ülkü Güney	ANAP	
Ministry of Foreign Affairs	Emre Gönensay	DYP	
Ministry of Finance	Lütfullah Kayalar	ANAP	
Ministry of National Education	Turhan Tayan	DYP	
Ministry of Public Works and Settlement	Mehmet Keçeciler	ANAP	
Ministry of Health and Social Security	Yıldırım Aktuna	DYP	
Ministry of Transport	Ömer Barutçu	DYP	
Ministry of Labour and Social Security	Emin Kul	ANAP	
Ministry of Industry and Commerce	Yalım Erez	DYP	
Ministry of Culture	Agah Oktay Güner	ANAP	
Ministry of Tourism	Işılay Saygın	DYP	
Ministry of Energy and Natural Resources	Hüsnü Doğan	ANAP	
Ministry of Agriculture and Village Affairs	İsmet Atilla	DYP	
Ministry of Forestry	Nevzat Ercan	DYP	
Ministry of Environment	Mustafa Taşar	ANAP	

== Aftermath ==
Both coalition parties had a similar ideology but were rivals of one another. Thus, from the first day, the coalition was faced with difficulties. On 24 May 1996, True Path Party (DYP) decided to withdraw from the government and formed another coalition with the Welfare Party (RP) on 28 June.

Preceded by 52nd government of Turkey (Tansu Çiller)	53rd Government of Turkey; 6 March 1996 – 28 June 1996	Succeeded by 54th government of Turkey (Necmettin Erbakan)
