= List of ministers of youth and sports of Turkey =

Following is a list of ministers of Youth and Sports of Turkey.

#	Minister	Took office	Left office	Party
Minister of Youth and Sports (1969-1983)
1	İsmet Sezgin	3 November 1969	26 March 1971	AP
2	Sezai Ergun	26 March 1971	11 December 1971	AP
3	Ali Adnan Karaküçük	11 December 1971	15 April 1973	AP
4	Ali Celalettin Coşkun	15 April 1973	26 January 1974	AP
5	Muslihittin Yılmaz Mete	26 January 1974	17 November 1974	CHP
6	Zekai Baloğlu	17 November 1974	31 March 1975	IP
7	Ali Şevki Erek	31 March 1975	21 June 1977	AP
8	Yüksel Çakmur	21 June 1977	1 July 1977	CHP
9	Önol Şakar	21 July 1977	14 October 1977	AP
[7]	Ali Şevki Erek	1 November 1977	5 January 1978	AP
[8]	Yüksel Çakmur	5 January 1978	12 November 1979	CHP
10	Talat Asal	12 November 1979	12 September 1980	AP
11	Vecdi Özgül	21 September 1980	13 December 1983	Military
Minister of National Education, Youth and Sports (1983-1989)
1	Mehmet Vehbi Dinçerler	13 December 1983	13 September 1985	ANAP
2	Metin Emiroğlu	13 September 1985	21 December 1987	ANAP
3	Hasan Celal Güzel	21 December 1987	18 March 1989	ANAP
Ministers responsible for Youth and Sports (1989-2011)
1	İsmet Özarslan	1 April 1989	21 July 1991	ANAP
2	İlhan Aküzüm	21 July 1991	20 November 1991	ANAP
3	Mehmet Ali Yılmaz	20 November 1991	21 July 1993	DYP
4	Şükrü Erdem	21 July 1993	5 October 1995	DYP
5	Ömer Barutçu	30 October 1995	6 March 1996	ANAP
6	Ersin Taranoğlu	6 March 1996	28 July 1996	ANAP
7	Bahattin Şeker	28 July 1996	30 July 1997	DYP
8	Yücel Seçkiner	30 July 1997	19 January 1999	ANAP
9	Fikret Ünlü	19 January 1999	24 August 2002	DSP
10	Erdoğan Toprak	24 August 2002	18 November 2002	DSP
11	Mehmet Ali Şahin	18 November 2002	29 August 2007	AKP
12	Murat Başesgioğlu	29 August 2007	1 May 2009	AKP
13	Faruk Nafiz Özak	1 May 2009	6 July 2011	AKP
Minister of Youth and Sports (2011-current)
1	Suat Kılıç	6 July 2011	25 December 2013	AKP
2	Akif Çağatay Kılıç	25 December 2013	19 July 2017	AKP
3	Osman Aşkın Bak	19 July 2017	10 July 2018	AKP
4	Mehmet Kasapoğlu	10 July 2018	4 June 2023	AKP
[3]	Osman Aşkın Bak	4 June 2023	Incumbent	AKP
