= Aydın (electoral district) =

Electoral district for the Grand National Assembly of Turkey

Coordinates: 37°50′N 34°45′E

- electoral district for the Grand National Assembly of Turkey
- Aydın shown within Turkey
- Province: Aydın
- Electorate: 728,328

Current electoral district
- Created: 1920
- Seats: 8 Historical: 8 (1999–2007) 7 (2007–2018)
- Turnout at last election: 88.70%
- Representation
- CHP: 4 / 8
- AK Party: 3 / 8
- İYİ: 1 / 8

Aydın is an electoral district of the Grand National Assembly of Turkey. It elects seven members of parliament (deputies) to represent the province of the same name for a four-year term by the D'Hondt method, a party-list proportional representation system.

== Members ==
Population reviews of each electoral district are conducted before each general election, which can lead to certain districts being granted a smaller or greater number of parliamentary seats. Aydın has elected 8 MPs since 2018. Previously it elected 7 from 2007 to 2018 and 8 from 1999 to 2007.

MPs for Aydın, 2002 onwards
Election	2002 (22nd Parliament)	2007 (23rd Parliament)	2011 (24th Parliament)	June 2015 (25th Parliament)	November 2015 (26th Parliament)	2018 (27th Parliament)
MP	Mehmet Boztaş; CHP	Mehmet Fatih Atay; CHP	Bülent Tezcan; CHP			
MP	Özlem Çerçioğlu; CHP		Metin Lütfi Baydar; CHP			Süleyman Bülbül; CHP
MP	Mehmet Semerci; CHP	Recep Taner; MHP	Osman Aydın; CHP	Hüseyin Yıldız; CHP		
MP	Mehmet Mesut Özakcan; CHP	Ertüğrül Kumcuoğlu; MHP	Ali Gültekin Kılıç; AK Party	Mehmet Fatih Atay; CHP	Mustafa Savaş; AK Party	
MP	Ahmet Ertürk; AK Party		Semiha Öyüş; AK Party	Mehmet Sadık Atay; AK Party	Mehmet Erdem; AK Party	Metin Yavuz; AK Party
MP	Semiha Öyüş; AK Party	Mehmet Erdem; AK Party		Abdurrahman Öz; AK Party		Rıza Posaci; AK Party
MP	Ahmet Rıza Acar; AK Party	Ali Uzunırmak; MHP			Deniz Depboylu; MHP	Aydın Adnan Sezgin; Good Party
MP	Atilla Koç; AK Party		No seat			Bekir Kuvvet Erim; AK Party

== General elections ==
=== 2011 ===
2011 general election: Aydın
Party	Candidate	Votes	%	±%
CHP	3 elected ▲1: 1. Bülent Tezcan ✓; 2. Metin Lütfi Baydar ✓; 3. Osman Aydın ✓; 4. Ferda Çağlar Erkut ✗; 5. Hüseyin Yıldız ✗; 6. Mehmet Fatih Atay ✗; 7. Özlem Burcu Uğan Sevim ✗	241,062	38.12	▲13.73
AK Party	3 elected 0: 1. Mehmet Erdem ✓; 2. Semiha Öyüş ✓; 3. Ali Gültekin Kılınç ✓; 4. Mustafa Savaş ✗; 5. Sebahattin Akkın ✗; 6. Abdurrahman Öz ✗; 7. Ufuk Keçeçi ✗	224,330	35.47	▲6.28
MHP	1 elected ▼2: 1. Ali Uzunırmak ✓; 2. Recep Taner ✗; 3. Gülnur Er ✗; 4. Ahmet Kaya ✗; 5. Mehmet Efe Yılmaz ✗; 6. Pınar Öncer ✗; 7. Hasan Duman ✗	115,087	18.20	▼7.70
Independent	None elected: Mehmet Bayraktar ✗ Orhan Özkaya ✗ Taci Erbaş ✗	24,078	3.81	▲1.06
DP	None elected: 1. Bekir Ongun ✗; 2. Seda Kanat ✗; 3. Mehmet Dönmez ✗; 4. Salih Muslu ✗; 5. İsmail Çoban ✗; 6. Mehmet Özçakır ✗; 7. Adem Sarcan ✗	7,132	1.13	▼8.81
Büyük Birlik	None elected: 1. Ali İhsan Yılmaz ✗; 2. Abdulbaki Bozdemir ✗; 3. Fatma Tabak ✗; 4. Yılmaz Vıcır ✗; 5. Cengiz Denek ✗; 6. Erkan Dinççoban ✗; 7. Hüseyin Akgül ✗	3,616	0.57	▲0.57
SAADET	None elected: 1. Füsun Vapur Karasoy ✗; 2. Musa Muça ✗; 3. Şerafettin Akyüz ✗; 4. Harun Bayram ✗; 5. Şükrü Yolcu ✗; 6. Mehmet Peçen ✗; 7. Ayşe Dindar ✗	3,129	0.49	▼0.57
HAS Party	None elected: 1. Ömer Özmen ✗; 2. Mehmet Emin Erbaş ✗; 3. Yüksel Duymaz ✗; 4. Bilgen Belkız Arat ✗; 5. Asım Kölecik ✗; 6. Seçkin Çelik ✗; 7. Harun Özdemir ✗	2,852	0.45	▲0.45
HEPAR	None elected: 1. Cemal Ulkan ✗; 2. Tuğrul Demir ✗; 3. Semra Kolukırık ✗; 4. Mehmet Tuğrul Bilikser ✗; 5. Hatice Çiğdem Akbalış ✗; 6. Arzu Kuloğlu ✗; 7. Nuri Akarkan ✗	2,766	0.44	▲0.44
DSP	None elected: 1. Mehmet Önder Aksakal ✗; 2. Bekir Hilmi Hakan Işıkçı ✗; 3. Nebahat Yıldırım ✗; 4. Abdullah Bedeloğlu ✗; 5. Süleyman Hışıroğlu ✗; 6. Hacer Oybak ✗; 7. Bülent Cünlü ✗	2,185	0.35	N/A
DYP	None elected: 1. Mustafa Kaçmaz ✗; 2. Muammer Danışman ✗; 3. Sedat Karataş ✗; 4. Yakup Demir ✗; 5. Sevgi Gürçay ✗; 6. Fatma Örücü ✗; 7. Tayip Teker ✗	2,048	0.32	▲0.32
MP	None elected: 1. Mehmet Karaçay ✗; 2. Safiye Çatal ✗; 3. Sevgül Tekin ✗; 4. Şennur Şimşek ✗; 5. Mehmet Baykara ✗; 6. Berrin Orhan ✗; 7. Hanife Açıkgöz ✗	1,795	0.28	▲0.28
Nationalist Conservative	None elected: 1. Ahmet Zeki Arslan ✗; 2. Cemal Ozan ✗; 3. Halil Bakan ✗; 4. Hakkın Yanık ✗; 5. Hasan Ortanca ✗; 6. Serkan Durur ✗; 7. Mustafa Özşeremet ✗	1,093	0.17	▲0.17
TKP	None elected: 1. Ali Ednan Feyizoğlu ✗; 2. Aysel Üzeroğlu ✗; 3. Engin Tuna ✗; 4. Reha Deniz Arda ✗; 5. Ali ihsan Şimşek ✗; 6. İlker Bayram ✗; 7. Burak Özdemir ✗	852	0.13	▼0.15
Liberal Democrat	None elected: 1. Emine Şükriye Ayder ✗; 2. Ahmet Bingül ✗; 3. Ahmet Avcı ✗; 4. Mustafa Kemal Soydan ✗; 5. Yunus Emre Özgün ✗; 6. Mehmet Emin Özer ✗; 7. Türkan Akyazı ✗	345	0.05	▲0.05
Labour	No candidates	0	0.00	0.00
Total votes		632,370	100.00	
Rejected ballots		15,485	2.45	▲0.72
Turnout		646,026	88.70	▼0.15
CHP gain from AK Party Majority		16,732	2.65	▼0.65

=== June 2015 ===
Abbr.	Party	Votes	%
CHP	Republican People's Party	267,395	40.6%
AK Party	Justice and Development Party	192,688	29.3%
MHP	Nationalist Movement Party	119,539	18.1%
HDP	Peoples' Democratic Party	58,254	8.8%
	Other	20,855	3.2%
Total		658,731	
Turnout		87.08%	
source: YSK

=== November 2015 ===
Abbr.	Party	Votes	%
CHP	Republican People's Party	272,532	40.8%
AK Party	Justice and Development Party	226,022	33.8%
MHP	Nationalist Movement Party	105,247	15.8%
HDP	Peoples' Democratic Party	46,753	7%
	Other	17,291	2.6%
Total		667,845	
Turnout		87.41%	
source: YSK

=== 2018 ===
Abbr.	Party	Votes	%
CHP	Republican People's Party	242,894	34.2%
AK Party	Justice and Development Party	222,373	31.3%
IYI	Good Party	106,555	15%
HDP	Peoples' Democratic Party	64,644	9.1%
MHP	Nationalist Movement Party	56,416	8%
	Other	16,657	2.3%
Total		709,539	
Turnout		89.00%	
source: YSK

== Presidential elections ==
=== 2014 ===
2014 presidential election: Aydın
Party	Candidate	Votes	%
Independent	Ekmeleddin İhsanoğlu	336,862	56.28
AK Party	Recep Tayyip Erdoğan	219,952	36.75
HDP	Selahattin Demirtaş	41,682	6.96
Total votes		598,496	100.00
Rejected ballots		11,918	1.95
Turnout		610,414	79.42
Ekmeleddin İhsanoğlu win			
