= Kublai (disambiguation) =

Kublai Khan (1215–1294) was a khagan of the Mongol Empire and emperor of the Yuan dynasty.

Kublai or Kublai Khan may also refer to:

- Kublai Khan (band), an American metalcore band
- "Kublai Khan" (song), a 2003 song by Jedi Mind Tricks
- Kublai Millan (born 1974), Filipino painter and sculptor

== See also ==
- Khubilai Noyon (died 1211), Mongol commander
- Kubilay, a Turkish name
- Kubla Khan, an 1816 poem by Samuel Taylor Coleridge
