= Hüseyin Yıldız =

Hüseyin Yıldız may refer to the following people:

- Hüseyin Yıldız (politician, born 1953)
- Hüseyin Yıldız (politician, born 1959)
- Hüseyin Yıldız (politician, born 1967)
- Hüseyin Yıldız (footballer)
