= Kırıkkale (electoral district) =

Electoral district for the Grand National Assembly of Turkey

- electoral district for the Grand National Assembly of Turkey
- Kırıkkale shown within Turkey
- Province: Kırıkkale
- Electorate: 196,198

Current electoral district
- Created: 1991
- Seats: 3 Historical: 4 (1995-2011) 3 (1991-1995)
- MPs: List: Beşir Atalay AKP Oğuz Kağan Köksal AKP Ramazan Can AKP
- Turnout at last election: 87.46%
- Representation
- AK Party: 1 / 3
- MHP: 1 / 3
- CHP: 1 / 3

Kırıkkale is an electoral district of the Grand National Assembly of Turkey. It elects sıx members of parliament (deputies) to represent the province of the same name for a four-year term by the D'Hondt method, a party-list proportional representation system.

== Members ==
Population reviews of each electoral district are conducted before each general election, which can lead to certain districts being granted a smaller or greater number of parliamentary seats. Kırıkkale's seat allocation has been three seats since 1999.

MPs for Kırıkkale, 1999 onwards
Seat	1999 (21st parliament)	2002 (22nd parliament)	2007 (23rd parliament)	2011 (24th parliament)	June 2015 (25th parliament)
1	Nihat Gökbulut; Anavatan	Vahit Erdem; AK Party		Beşir Atalay; AK Party	Ramazan Can; AK Party
2	Hacı Filiz; DYP	Murat Yılmazer; AK Party	Mustafa Özbayrak; AK Party	Oğuz Kağan Köksal; AK Party	
3	Kemal Albayarak; FP	Ramazan Can; AK Party	Turan Kıratlı; AK Party	Ramazan Can; AK Party	Seyit Ahmet Göçer; MHP
4	Osman Durmuş; MHP	Halil Tiryaki; CHP	Osman Durmuş; MHP	Seat abolished	

== General elections ==
=== 2011 ===
General Election 2011: Kırıkkale
Party	Candidate	Votes	%	±%
AK Party	3 elected 0: 1. Beşir Atalay ✓; 2. Oğuz Kağan Köksal ✓; 3. Ramazan Can ✓	105,036	62.11	▲4.14
MHP	None elected ▼1: 1. Osman Durmuş ✗; 2. İdris Karakuş ✗; 3. Veli Uca ✗	31,802	18.81	▼3.70
CHP	None elected: 1. Yaşar Yılmaz ✗; 2. Rafet Ulusoy ✗; 3. Hacı Arap Karadurmuş ✗	25,620	15.15	▲3.65
SAADET	None elected: 1. Faruk Vurgun ✗; 2. Selami Çakır ✗; 3. Ramazan Gözalan ✗	1,675	0.99	▼0.83
HAS Party	None elected: 1. Satılmış Aksun ✗; 2. Mustafa Dede Aktaş ✗; 3. Bilal Kayaalp ✗	1,606	0.95	▲0.95
Büyük Birlik	None elected: 1. Hamza Halıcıoğlu ✗; 2. Osman Yıldız ✗; 3. Halil Günel ✗	1,436	0.85	▲0.85
DP	None elected: 1. Cengiz Uysal ✗; 2. Mehmet Subaşı ✗; 3. Mustafa Çetin ✗	681	0.40	▼2.76
DYP	None elected: 1. Bülent Mustafa Güngenci ✗; 2. Muharrem Çıkar ✗; 3. Veli Şepitci ✗	246	0.15	▲0.15
DSP	None elected: 1. Hasan Özmen ✗; 2. Müslüm Ulusoy ✗; 3. Ziya Kaya ✗	230	0.14	N/A'"`UNIQ−−ref−00000012−QINU`"'
HEPAR	None elected: 1. Sibel Çelik ✗; 2. Fatma Kürşadoğlu ✗; 3. Aylin Gür ✗	217	0.13	▲0.13
Labour	None elected: 1. Tahsin Ayna ✗; 2. Mustafa Kadıoğlu ✗; 3. Mahir Selami Sivri ✗	185	0.11	▼0.03
Nationalist Conservative	None elected: 1. Fatma Ekinci ✗; 2. Yasen Şimşek ✗; 3. Aynur Karacasu ✗	125	0.07	▲0.07
TKP	None elected: 1. Mustafa Tozkoparan ✗; 2. Menşure Özmen ✗; 3. Zeliha Özkan ✗	103	0.06	0.00
MP	None elected: 1. Ahmet Sağlam ✗; 2. Kadir Çetin ✗; 3. Ramazan Güler ✗	96	0.06	▲0.06
Liberal Democrat	None elected: 1. Ziya Erkan Süelden ✗; 2. Abdullah Kerem Hepşennur ✗; 3. Bülent Gider ✗	49	0.03	▼0.07
Total votes		169,107	100.00	
Rejected ballots		3,025	1.76	▲0.91
Turnout		171,592	87.46	▲5.08
AK Party hold Majority		73,234	43.31	▲7.82

=== 2007 ===
General Election 2007: Kırıkkale
Party	Candidate	Votes	%	±%
AK Party	3 elected 0: 1. VAHİT ERDEM ✓; 2. MUSTAFA ÖZBAYRAK ✓; 3. TURAN KIRATLI ✓; 4. ORHAN AYTEKİN ✗	91,132	57.99	▲8.87
MHP	1 elected ▲1: 1. OSMAN DURMUŞ ✓; 2. KÖKSAL TONGA ✗; 3. ŞEVKET ÖZSOY ✗; 4. YEŞİM OKTAR VARLI ✗	35,361	22.50	▲8.40
CHP	None elected ▼1: 1. ALİYE GÜNDÜZ ✗; 2. İDRİS KILINÇKAYA ✗; 3. HASAN BİÇER ✗; 4. YILMAZ TUFAN ✗	18,079	11.50	▼1.35
DP	None elected: 1. ÖMER FARUK ILICAN ✗; 2. MEHMET KARATAŞ ✗; 3. KUDRET BAŞTUĞ ✗; 4. GÜRSOY TOPSOY ✗	4,967	3.16	'"`UNIQ−−ref−00000018−QINU`"'▼6.71
SAADET	None elected: 1. ARİF ERDAL ✗; 2. ABDURRAHMAN BULUM ✗; 3. SELAMİ ÇAKIR ✗; 4. SAVAŞ ÖNER ✗	2,865	1.82	▼0.11
GP	None elected: 1. DURAN ŞAKOĞLU ✗; 2. KEMAL KAMBER ✗; 3. MURAT AGÇABAĞ ✗; 4. HAYATİ ŞAKALAKOĞLU ✗	1,539	0.98	▼3.48
ATP	None elected: 1. MEHMET EMİN ALKAN ✗; 2. REMZİ GÜVEN ✗; 3. MERYEM ABAN ✗; 4. MUZAFFER AKCAN ✗	1,145	0.73	▲0.73
HYP	None elected: 1. İBRAHİM HİKMET TAFLAN ✗; 2. İBRAHİM DURMUŞKAYA ✗; 3. SEBAHAT HAKTANIR ✗; 4. FATMA HÜRRİYET ŞİŞLİ ✗	532	0.34	▲0.34
İP	None elected: 1. SAMİ PEHLİVANLI ✗; 2. YAKUP SEVİNÇ ✗; 3. VASFİ MURAT TOPALOĞLU ✗; 4. NEZİH GÜLŞEN ✗	500	0.32	▼0.07
BTP	None elected: 1. İSMAİL HAKKI AKÇİN ✗; 2. FAHRETDİN GÜLEÇ ✗; 3. KÜRŞAT TAŞDEMİR ✗; 4. ÜMİT ÖZTÜRK ✗	437	0.28	▲0.04
Labour	None elected: 1. BAKİ POLAT ✗; 2. NAZİFE AKSOY ✗; 3. FUAT TUĞ ✗; 4. NİHAT GAZALOĞLU ✗	210	0.13	▲0.13
Liberal Democrat	None elected: 1. MEHMET BEYAZ ✗; 2. NESRİN BEYAZ ✗; 3. NURAN ADIGÜZEL ✗; 4. MUHSİN KOCAOĞLU ✗	157	0.10	▼0.02
ÖDP	None elected: 1. HAYDAR YANIKTEPE ✗; 2. AYŞE ŞİMŞEK ✗; 3. MUSTAFA AYKUL ✗; 4. İBRAHİM GEZER ✗	127	0.08	▼0.02
Communist_Party_of_Turkey_(today)	None elected: 1. ALPER ÖZGE ✗; 2. MURAT TOKEL ✗; 3. AYŞE VURAL ✗; 4. RÜSTEM ŞEN ✗	107	0.07	▼0.03
Total votes		158,498	100.00	
Rejected ballots		1,340	0.85	▼1.68
Turnout		158,498	82.38	▲2.19
AK Party hold Majority		55,771	35.49	▲1.24

== Presidential elections ==
=== 2014 ===
Presidential Election 2014: Kırıkkale
Party	Candidate	Votes	%
AK Party	Recep Tayyip Erdoğan	91,931	63.96
Independent	Ekmeleddin İhsanoğlu	50,023	34.80
HDP	Selahattin Demirtaş	1,787	1.24
Total votes		143,741	100.00
Rejected ballots		2,855	1.95
Turnout		146,596	75.21
Recep Tayyip Erdoğan win			
