= Kubilay =

Kubilay is a Turkish masculine given name, which is the Turkish spelling of the name of Kublai, Great Khan of the Mongol Empire and founder of the Yuan dynasty in China. It is also used as a surname. Notable people with the name are as follows:

== Given name ==
- Kubilay Aka (born 1995), Turkish actor
- Kubilay Aktaş (born 1995), Turkish football player
- Kubilay Kanatsızkuş (born 1997), Turkish football player
- Kubilay Karça (born 1996), Turkish rapper and songwriter
- Kubilay Türkyilmaz, Swiss football player
- Kubilay Uygun (1955–2016), Turkish politician
- Kubilay Yilmaz (born 1996), Austrian football player

== Surname ==
- Mustafa Fehmi Kubilay (1906–1930), Turkish teacher
