= Mustafa Savaş =

Turkish bank executive and politician

Mustafa Savaş MP

Member of the Grand National Assembly
- Incumbent
- Assumed office November 17, 2015
- Constituency: Aydın (Nov 2015, 2018, 2023)

Personal details
- Born: 1965; Çine, Aydın, Turkey
- Political party: Justice and Development Party
- Children: 2
- Education: Faculty of Political Science, Ankara University
- Occupation: Bank manager and politician

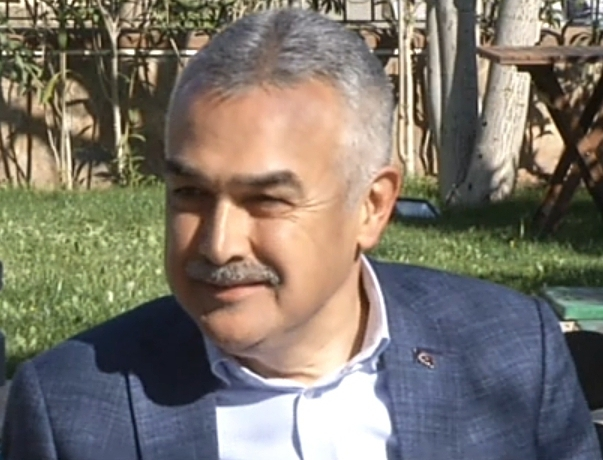
Mustafa Savas

Mustafa Savaş (born in 1965, Çine, Aydın, Turkey) is a Turkish bank executive and politician. He was elected as a member of the Turkish Grand National Assembly (TBMM) in the 26th, 27th, and 28th terms as an AK Party (Justice and Development Party) deputy representing Aydın.

== Biography ==
Mustafa Savaş was born in 1965 in the Çine district of Aydın, Turkey. After completing his education at Izmir Atatürk High School, he pursued his university education at Ankara University Faculty of Political Sciences.

After graduating, he started his career at Halkbank in the position of inspector assistant and over the years, he took on various roles at different levels within the bank, including inspector, branch manager, and department head.

Following the 2001 economic crisis in Turkey, he was appointed as the deputy general manager during the restructuring of Halk Bank. He also served as the chairman of the board of the bank's insurance company. From 2002 to 2009, he worked as the deputy general manager responsible for risk management and Internal control. In the 2009–2010 period, he held the position of deputy general manager for risk monitoring and liquidation. In 2010–2011, he served as the deputy general manager for individual loans, and in 2011, he was the deputy general manager for deposit and cash management. He continued to work as the deputy general manager for financial management and planning until 2014 when he began to focus more on his political career.

Mustafa Savaş is fluent in English, and he is married with two children.

=== Political career ===
Mustafa Savaş, who was serving as the deputy general manager at Halkbank, ran as a parliamentary candidate for the Justice and Development Party (AKP) in the 2011 general elections in Aydın. However, he was not able to secure a seat in the parliament as he was listed as the 4th candidate, and the AKP won three seats in that election.

He continued his political career in Aydın and in the 2014 local elections, he was nominated as the AKP candidate for the Mayor of Aydın Metropolitan Municipality. Although he received 29.1% of the vote, he finished in second place in the election.

In the June 2015 general elections, it was expected that Savaş would have a higher position on the party list. However, he was once again listed as the 4th candidate, and the AKP only managed to secure two seats. But in the November 2015 general elections, he was placed as the 3rd candidate for the AKP in Aydın. As a result of the increased vote share for his party in Aydın, rising from 29.7% to 34.4%, he earned the right to become a member of the Turkish Grand National Assembly (TBMM) as an Aydın deputy. He assumed responsibilities in the TBMM Planning and Budget Commission.

In December 2015, he also took on a role in the party management as the deputy of Mehmet Özhaseki, the vice president in charge of local governments in the AKP.
