= 54th government of Turkey =

Government of the Republic of Turkey (1996-1997)

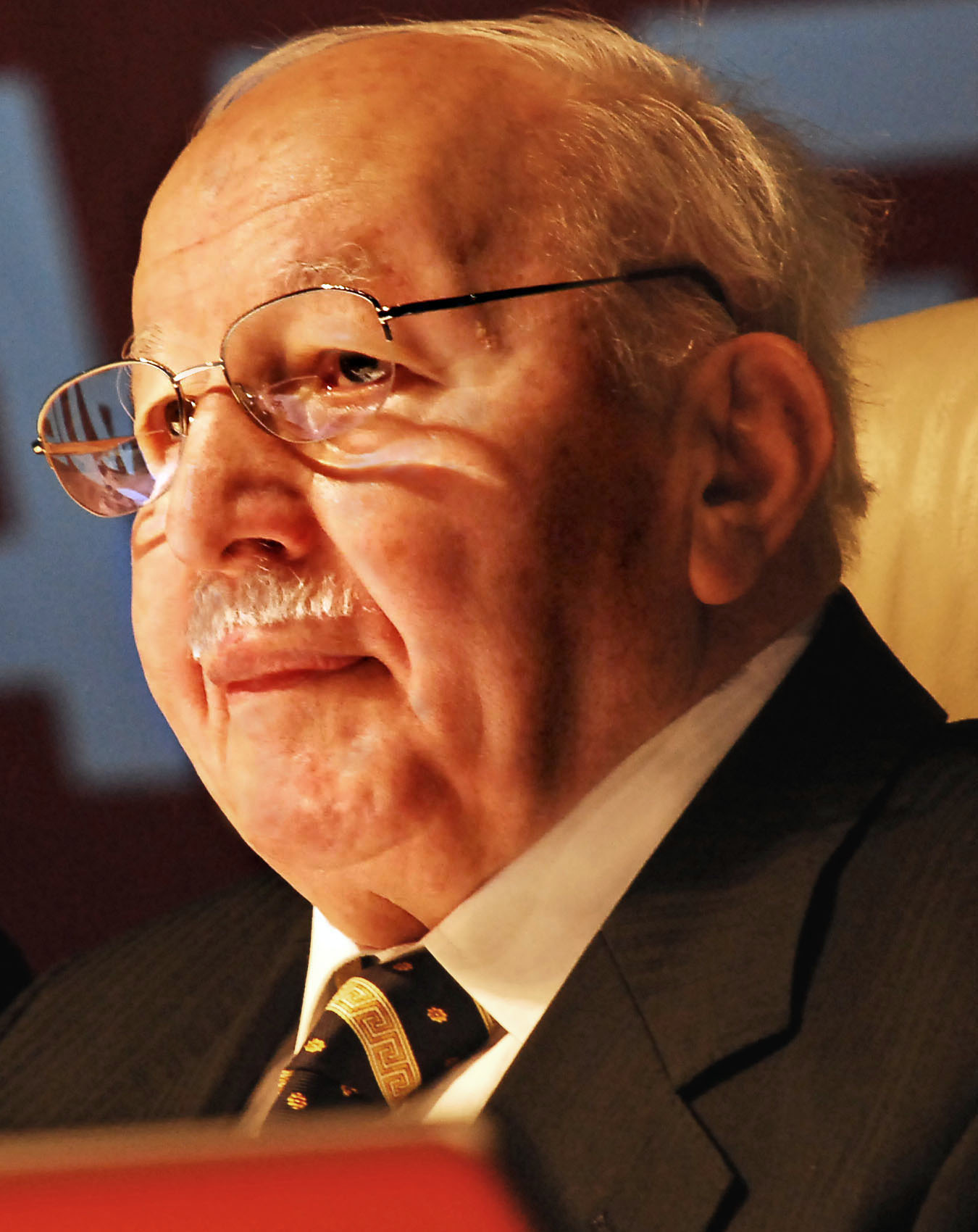
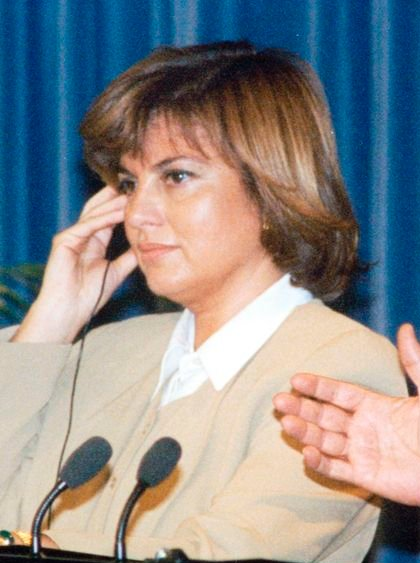
Necmettin Erbakan of Welfare Party (left) and Tansu Çiller of True Path Party (right)

The 54th government of Turkey governed Turkey from 28 June 1996 to 30 June 1997. It was a coalition government formed by Welfare Party (RP) and True Path Party (DYP), and was known as Refahyol (a portmanteau of the Turkish names of the two parties in the coalition).

== Background ==
After the fall of the 53rd government of Turkey, in which True Path Party (DYP) was one of the participants, Welfare Party (RP) and True Path Party (DYP) formed a coalition government.

Initially, Necmettin Erbakan of Welfare Party was the prime minister and Tansu Çiller of True Path Party was the deputy prime minister. After two years, they were to rotate in the position. However, the DYP was the third-largest in the parliament, and when Erbakan stepped down to begin the rotation, President Süleyman Demirel asked Mesut Yılmaz, leader of the Motherland Party which was the second-largest, to form the new government instead.

== Government ==
In the list below, the serving period of cabinet members who served only a part of the cabinet's lifespan are shown in the column "Notes".

Title	Name	Party	Notes
Prime Minister	Necmettin Erbakan	RP	
Deputy Prime Minister and Ministry of Foreign Affairs	Tansu Çiller	DYP	
Minister of State
Minister of State	Fehim Adak	RP	
Minister of State	Nevzat Ercan	DYP	
Minister of State	Abdullah Gül	RP	
Minister of State	Işılay Saygın	DYP	
Minister of State	Sabri Tekir	RP	
Minister of State	Nafiz Kurt	DYP	
Minister of State	Mehmet Altınsoy	RP	
Minister of State	Namık Kemal Zeybek	DYP	
Minister of State	Lütfi Esengün	RP	
Minister of State	Selim Ensarioğlu	DYP	
Minister of State	Cemil Tunç	RP	
Minister of State	Bekir Aksoy	DYP	
Minister of State	Gürcan Dağdaş	RP	
Minister of State	Ufuk Söylemez	DYP	
Minister of State	Teoman Rıza Güneri	RP	
Minister of State	Ayfer Yılmaz	DYP	
Minister of State	Sacit Günbey	RP	
Minister of State	Bahattin Şaker	DYP	
Minister of State	Ahmet Demircan	RP	
Ministry of Justice	Şevket Kazan	RP	
Ministry of National Defense	Turhan Tayan	DYP	
Ministry of the Interior	Mehmet Ağar; Meral Akşener	DYP	28 June 1996 – 8 November 1996; 8 November 1996 – 30 June 1997
Ministry of Foreign Affairs	Emre Gönensay	DYP	
Ministry of Finance	Abdüllatif Şener	RP	
Ministry of National Education	Mehmet Sağlam	DYP	
Ministry of Public Works and Settlement	Cevat Ayhan	RP	
Ministry of Health and Social Security	Yıldırım Aktuna; İsmail Karakuyu	DYP	28 June 1996 – 26 April 1997; 13 May 1997 – 30 June 1997
Ministry of Transport	Ömer Barutçu	DYP	
Ministry of Labour and Social Security	Necati Çelik	RP	
Ministry of Industry and Commerce	Yalım Erez; Ali Rıza Gönül	DYP	28 June 1996 – 26 April 1997; 13 May 1997 – 30 June 1997
Ministry of Energy and Natural Resources	Recai Kutan	RP	
Ministry of Culture	İsmail Kahraman	RP	
Ministry of Tourism	Bahattin Yücel	DYP	28 June 1996 – 13 June 1997
Ministry of Agriculture and Village Affairs	Musa Demirci	RP	
Ministry of Forestry	Halit Dağlı	DYP	
Ministry of Environment	Ziyaettin Tokar	RP	

== Aftermath ==
Necmettin Erbakan resigned as prime minister, hoping his coalition partner Tansu Çiller would be the next prime minister and a similar government would be formed. However, president Süleyman Demirel appointed Mesut Yılmaz of Motherland Party as the new prime minister (see Prime ministership of Necmettin Erbakan).

Preceded by 53rd government of Turkey (Mesut Yılmaz)	54th Government of Turkey (28 June 1996- 30 June 1997)	Succeeded by 55th government of Turkey (Mesut Yılmaz)
