= Yıldırım Aktuna =

Turkish politician

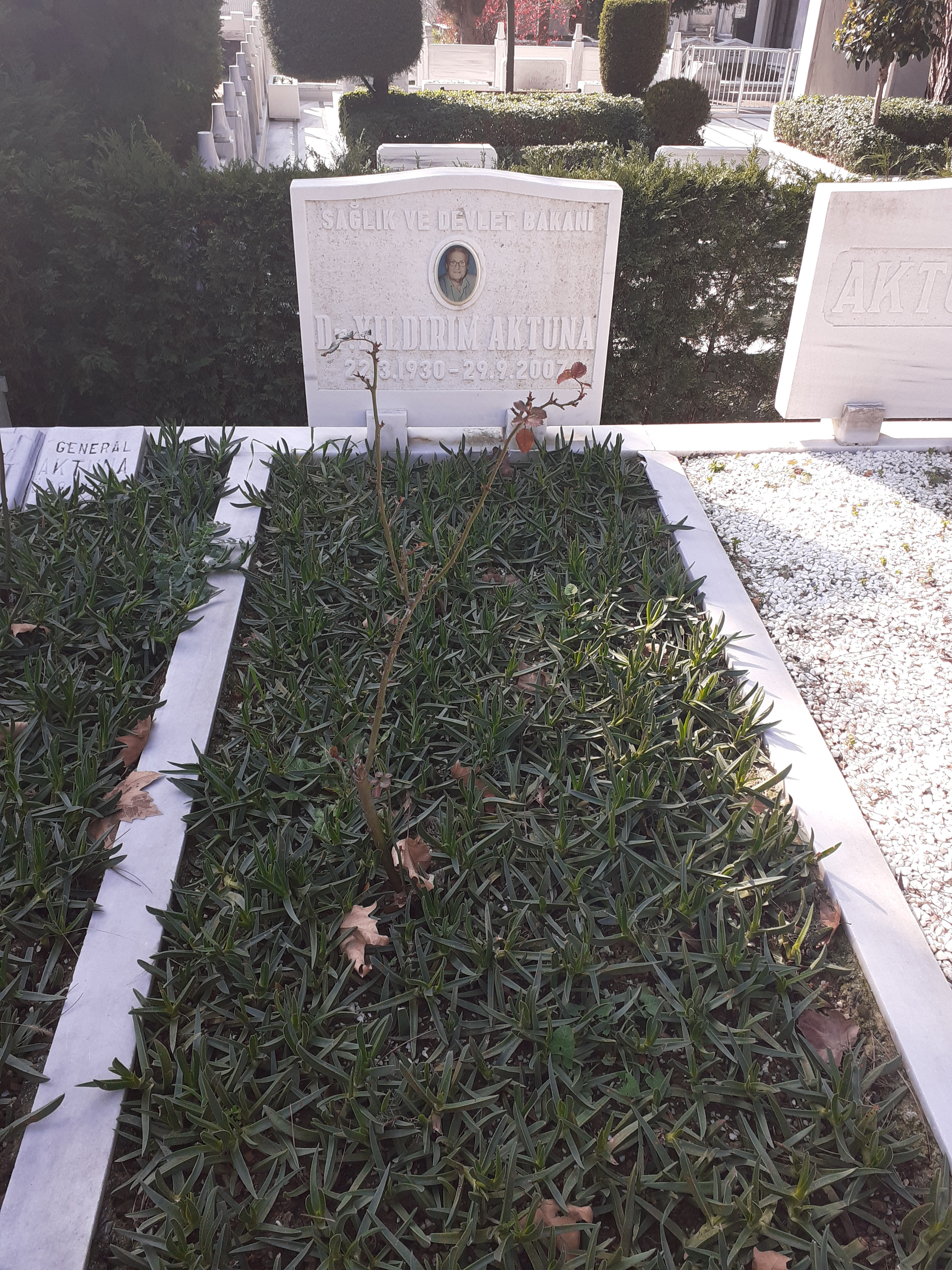
- A grave in Yıldırım Aktuna

State minister of Turkey
- In office June 30, 1997 – January 11, 1999 Serving with Mehmet Salih Yıldırım, Metin Gürdere, Burhan Kara, Hasan Hüsamettin Özkan, Ahat Andican, Mehmet Batallı, Şükrü Sina Gürel, Hikmet Sami Türk, Yücel Seçkiner, Rifat Serdaroğlu, Işılay Saygın, Mehmet Cavit Kavak, Hasan Gemici, Mustafa Yılmaz, Işın Çelebi, Güneş Taner, Rüştü Kazım Yücelen
- Prime Minister: Mesut Yılmaz

Minister of Health of Turkey
- In office March 7, 1996 – April 26, 1997
- Prime Minister: Necmettin Erbakan, Mesut Yılmaz
- Preceded by: Doğan Baran
- Succeeded by: Nafiz Kurt

State minister of Turkey
- In office June 25, 1993 – October 5, 1995 Serving with Ali Şevki Erek, Nurhan Tekinel, Salih Sümer, Mehmet Gazioğlu, Türkan Akyol, Ahmet Esat Kıratlıoğlu, Mehmet Gölhan, Azimet Köylüoğlu, Aysel Baykal, Mehmet Gülcegün, Ahmet Şanal, Nafiz Kurt, Şükrü Erdem, Ziya Halis, Necmettin Cevheri, Güneş Müftüoğlu, Bahattin Alagöz, İbrahim Tez, Onur Kumbaracıbaşı, Aykon Doğan, Mustafa Çiloğlu, Bekir Sami Daçe, Önay Alpago, Cemil Erhan, Erman Şahin, Ayvaz Gökdemir, Fikri Sağlar, Mehmet Ali Yılmaz, Abdülbaki Ataç, Mehmet Kahraman, Algan Hacaloğlu
- Prime Minister: Tansu Çiller

Minister of Health of Turkey
- In office November 20, 1991 – June 25, 1993
- Prime Minister: Süleyman Demirel
- Preceded by: Yaşar Eryılmaz
- Succeeded by: Rıfat Serdaroğlu

District mayor of Bakırköy, Istanbul
- In office 1989–1991
- Preceded by: Kemal Naci Ekşi
- Succeeded by: Ali Talip Özdemir

Personal details
- Born: 1930 Istanbul, Turkey
- Died: September 29, 2007 (aged 77) Bodrum, Muğla Province
- Resting place: Zincirlikuyu Cemetery, Istanbul
- Party: Liberal Democratic Party (LDP), Party for a Democratic Turkey (DTP), True Path Party (DYP), Social Democratic Populist Party (SHP)
- Spouse: Zeliha Berksoy
- Children: Oğul Aktuna (son)
- Education: Medicine
- Alma mater: Istanbul University
- Profession: Military physician, psychiatrist, politician

Yıldırım Aktuna (1930 – September 29, 2007) was a Turkish psychiatrist, politician, district mayor and government minister in a number of cabinets.

== Early years ==
He was born 1930 in Istanbul. After completing the high school in Karşıyaka, İzmir in 1948, Yıldırım Aktuna attended the School of Medicine of the University of Istanbul as a cadet. In 1954, he graduated with Doctor of Medicine degree in the rank of a lieutenant.

== Military career ==
His first post was chief physician officer of the 26th Brigade at the 66th Army Division. After completing a one-year English language course at the Army Language School in Ankara, Aktuna was sent to the United States, where he attended advanced education in general medicine at the Brooke Army Medical Center in Fort Sam Houston, San Antonio between 1958 and 1959.

Having returned home, Aktuna specialized in neuropsychiatry at the Gülhane Military Medical Academy in Ankara, finishing in 1962. He then served in the army as medical officer at various places in Turkey. Between 1967 and 1989, he was lecturer at the Kabul Military Hospital in Afghanistan. In 1970, he retired from the Turkish Army in the rank of a lieutenant colonel.

== Civil service ==
Switched over to civil service, he firstly was appointed Assistant Chief Physician at the Psychology Clinic of Şişli Children's Hospital in Istanbul. He later became the chief of that clinic.

Between 1972 and 1973, Aktuna sojourned in Austria to pursue advanced studies in neurology and electroencephalography (EEG) at the Neurological Clinic of the University of Vienna.

In 1979, Yıldırım Aktuna was appointed Chief Physician of the Bakırköy Psychiatric Hospital in Istanbul, the largest of its art in the country. He modernized the hospital, and devoted himself to raise consciousness for public mental health and to develop contemporary policies on this subject. He established in 1983 an alcohol and drug rehabilitation center within this hospital, the first facility in Turkey to conduct medical and psychotherapeutic treatment and research for dependency on psychoactive substances as well. For these activities, he was honored several times by various organizations.

== Politics ==
Yıldırım Aktuna resigned from his post on December 30, 1988, and entered politics joining the Social Democratic Populist Party (SHP). On March 26, 1989, he was elected district mayor of Bakırköy in Istanbul, where he was much respected.

After serving two and half years in the regional politics, Aktuna quit his post and joined the True Path Party (DYP) on August 27, 1991. Following the general elections, he entered the parliament on October 20, 1991, as a deputy of Istanbul.

Yıldırım Aktuna served between 1991 and 1993 as Minister of Health in the cabinet of Süleyman Demirel (49th government). In 1993, Tansu Çiller appointed him Minister of State and government spokesman in her cabinet. (50th government ) After serving two years, he became Minister of Health again between 1996 and 1997 in the cabinets of Mesut Yılmaz and later of Necmettin Erbakan (53rd government and 54th government). From 1997 to 1999, Aktuna served Minister of State in the cabinet of Mesut Yılmaz. During his duty as Minister of Health, he prepared a healthcare reform programme and organized twice national healthcare congresses. Furthermore, he continued to support all the activities he initiated at the Bakırköy Psychiatric Hospital.

Yıldırım Aktuna left the True Path Party (DYP) on May 30, 1996, keeping his membership in the parliament as an independent deputy. On July 1, 1997, he joined "Party for a Democratic Turkey" (DTP), which was founded some months ago by unsatisfied DYP politicians, and was appointed vice president by its leader Hüsamettin Cindoruk. He served as minister in the coalition cabinets from 1996 to 1998. However, he returned to DYP on November 24, 2001. Finally, he joined in 2003 the Liberal Democratic Party (LDP), a small party with leadership problems at that time.

== Illness and death ==
Diagnosed with pancreatic cancer in February 2007, he decided to undergo a P53-based gene therapy, which is applied in more than hundred hospitals in China since 2004. For this purpose, he traveled the next month to China, where he stayed until August.

Yıldırım Aktuna died on September 29, 2007, in the German Hospital, Istanbul, where he was brought from Bodrum, Muğla twelve days before. He was buried at the Zincirlikuyu Cemetery on October 2.

He was succeeded by his son Oğul Aktuna and his divorced second wife Zeliha Berksoy, a theatre actress and the daughter of Turkish prima donna Semiha Berksoy.

== See also ==
- List of Turkish physicians
