= Deniz Depboylu =

Turkish politician (born 1968)

Member of the Grand National Assembly
- In office 1 November 2015 – 7 July 2018
- Constituency: Aydın (Nov 2015)

Personal details
- Born: 6 June 1968 (age 58) Aydın, Turkey
- Party: Nationalist Movement Party (MHP)
- Education: Gazi University
- Occupation: Politician

Deniz Depboylu (born 6 June 1968) is a Turkish serving as the Nationalist Movement Party's vice-president. She also served as a Member of Parliament for Aydın, from the November 2015 elections until she lost her seat in the 2018 election.

== Early career ==
Depboylu was elected as a member of the Nazilli Municipality Council in the 2014 Turkish local elections, and subsequently served as deputy chair of the council.

== Political career ==
Depboylu contested the June 2015 elections on the MHP list for Aydın. Being placed 4th on the list she was not elected to parliament. Depboylu ran again in the snap November 2015 elections, this time being placed first on the MHP party lists, she was elected to parliament. She was defeated in the 2018 elections.

In the 2023 Turkish general election, Depboylu ran as the lead candidate for the Nationalist Action Party (MHP) in the Aydın constituency, but was not elected to parliament.

== See also ==
- 26th Parliament of Turkey
