= Osman Aşkın Bak =

Turkish politician

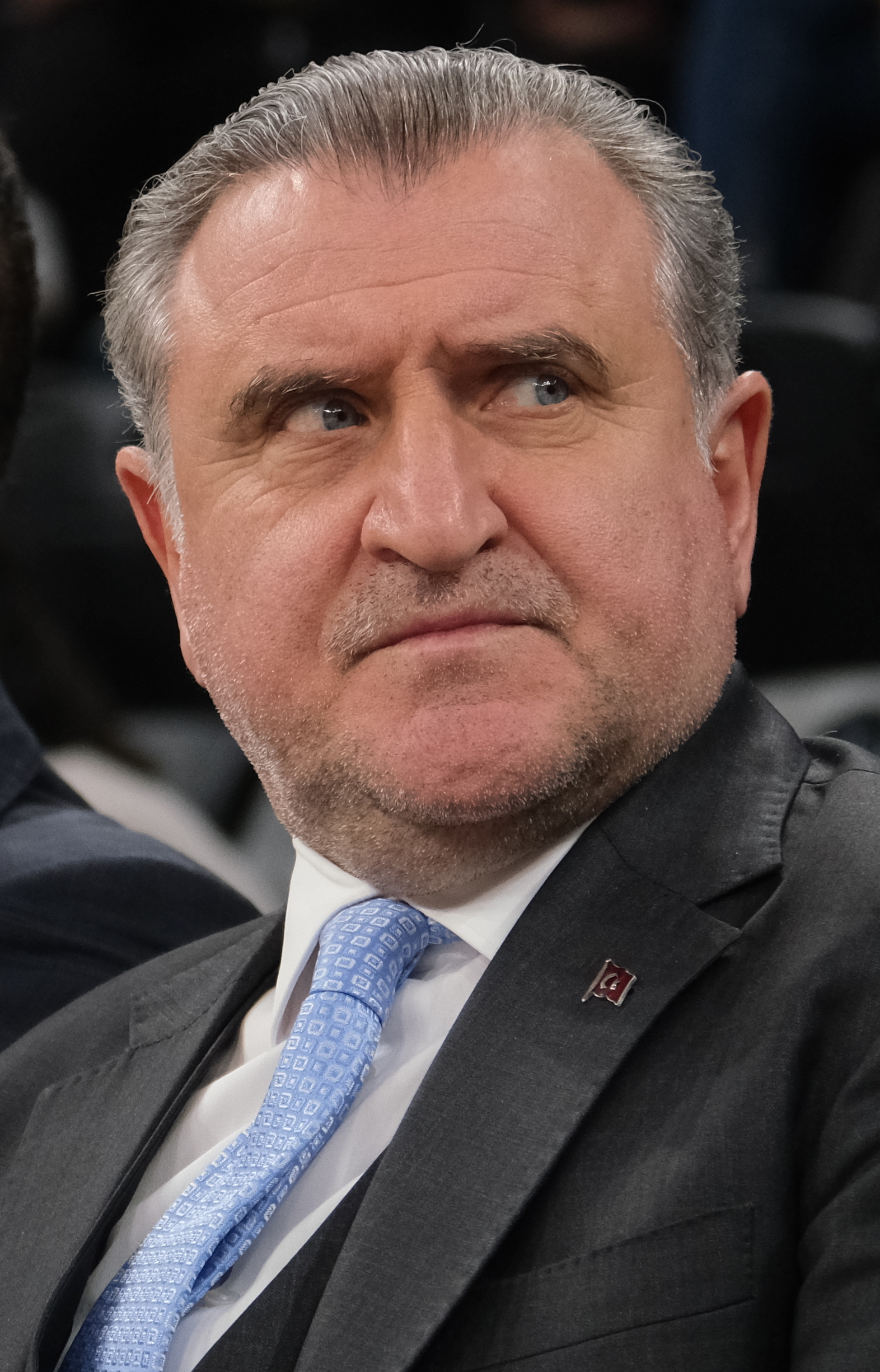
- Bak in 2024

Minister of Youth and Sports
- Incumbent
- Assumed office 4 June 2023
- President: Recep Tayyip Erdoğan
- Preceded by: Mehmet Kasapoğlu
- In office 19 July 2017 – 9 July 2018
- Prime Minister: Binali Yıldırım
- Preceded by: Akif Çağatay Kılıç
- Succeeded by: Mehmet Kasapoğlu

Member of the Grand National Assembly
- In office 12 June 2011 – 2 June 2023
- Constituency: Istanbul - (2011); Rize (June 2015); Rize - (Nov 2015); Rize - (2018)

Personal details
- Born: 11 October 1966 (age 59) Üsküdar, Istanbul, Turkey
- Citizenship: Turkish
- Party: Justice and Development Party
- Spouse: Tülay Bak
- Children: 4
- Education: Kabataş Boys High School
- Alma mater: Istanbul Technical University (BS, PhD); University of Nottingham (MS)
- Cabinet: 65th 67th

Osman Aşkın Bak (born October 11, 1966) is a Turkish mechanical engineer, politician and the current Minister of Youth and Sports.

== Early life and education ==
His family originates from the Derinsu village of the Pazar district of Rize.

He attended Kabataş Boys High School from 1980 to 1983, and met later president Recep Tayyip Erdoğan, who lived in the same neighborhood during this period. He later attended and graduated from Istanbul Technical University, Faculty of Mechanical Engineering in 1987. During his university years, he managed the football team Esenler Erokspor, and participated in election preparations for the Welfare Party alongside Recep Tayyip Erdoğan.

In 1988, he moved to London, later beginning his postgraduate on Business Management and Industrial Engineering at the University of Nottingham, during which he worked as a football referee in Nottingham for two years. In 1992, he completed his postgraduate and returned to Turkey, beginning his doctorate at Istanbul Technical University, Institute of Science on Industrial Engineering.

He served as a member of the Executive Board of the Foreign Economic Relations Board of Turkey and the Turkish-Iranian Business Council. He has also served as a Council Member at the Istanbul Chamber of Commerce and served as General Secretary, President, and Board Member in various sports clubs.

== Political career ==
He was elected as a Member of Parliament for Istanbul in the 24th term and for Rize in the 25th, 26th and 27th Term. He became a member of the Turkish Group of the NATO Parliamentary Assembly and the Spokesperson of the Foreign Affairs Commission. He was elected as the Deputy Chairman of the Political Committee of the NATO Parliamentary Assembly. He has also served as Chairman of the Anti-Doping Investigation Commission. He previously served as Minister of Youth and Sports in the 65th cabinet of Turkey, and is currently serving as the Minister of Youth and Sports in the 67th cabinet of Turkey.

== Personal life ==
Bak is fluent in English and knows an intermediate amount of German and Persian. He is married and has 4 children.
