= Mehmet Kasapoğlu =

Turkish politician

Dr. Mehmet Kasapoğlu
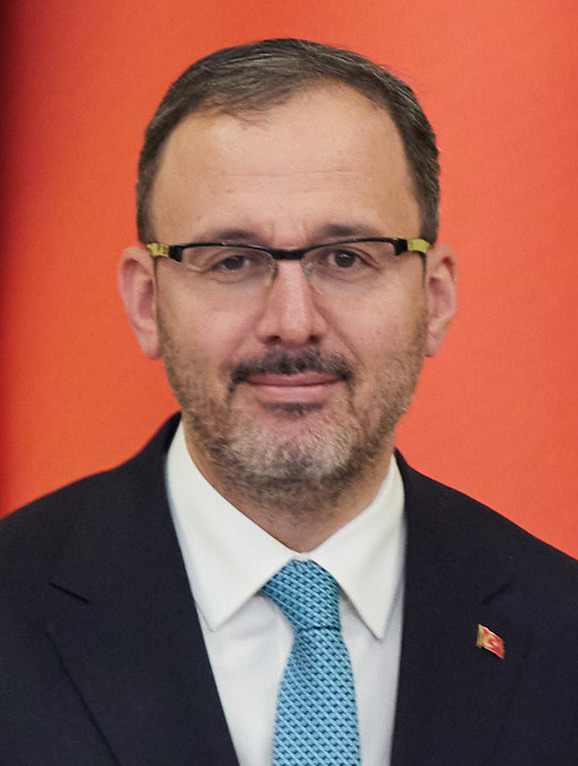
- Kasapoğlu in 2022

Minister of Youth and Sports
- In office 10 July 2018 – 4 June 2023
- President: Recep Tayyip Erdoğan
- Preceded by: Osman Aşkın Bak
- Succeeded by: Osman Aşkın Bak

Personal details
- Born: 22 December 1976 (age 49) Istanbul, Turkey
- Party: Independent
- Education: Marmara University, Florida State University, Palm Beach Atlantic University, Istanbul University

Mehmet Muharrem Kasapoğlu (born 22 December 1976) is a Turkish civil servant and former Minister of Youth and Sports from 2018 to 2023.

== Early life ==
Mehmet Muharrem Kasapoğlu was born in Istanbul, Turkey in 1976. He studied Business administration at Marmara University's Faculty of Economics and Administrative Science, and graduated with a Bachelor's degree. Later, he earned a Master's degree in Local administrations and Decentralization at the same university. He w carried out works as a researcher, specialist and project coordinator in the field of Management organization at Florida State University's Faculty of Business administration. He earned another Bacholar's degree in Business administration from Palm Beach Atlantic University in Florida. Returned home, Kasapoğlu obtained a Doctor title in Local employment from Istanbul University.

== Career ==
He served in non-governmental organization during his education years in Turkey and abroad. He then worked in the field of international trade in the private sector. Kasapoğlu served in various tasks at the ministries of Labour and Social Services, National Education and Youth and Sports following his appointment to Advisor to the Prime Minister of Turkey in 2009. During his term as the president of Spor Toto Corporation, he contributed to the creation of many sports facilities throughout the country, which enabled the spread and accessibility to sports for everyone. He focused on the financing of youth, education and sports activities and increasing sports employment. Further, he worked in coordination with the ministries of Finance, Interior, Justice, and Youth and Sports to fight against illegal sports betting, which harms the national economy.

On 10 July 2018, he was appointed Minister of Youth and Sports in the Cabinet Erdoğan IV.

Political offices
| Preceded by Osman Aşkın Bak | Minister of Youth and Sports; 10 July 2018 – 4 June 2023 | Succeeded by Osman Aşkın Bak |
