= Ministry of Youth and Sports (Turkey) =

Government ministry of Turkey

- Gençlik ve Spor Bakanlığı

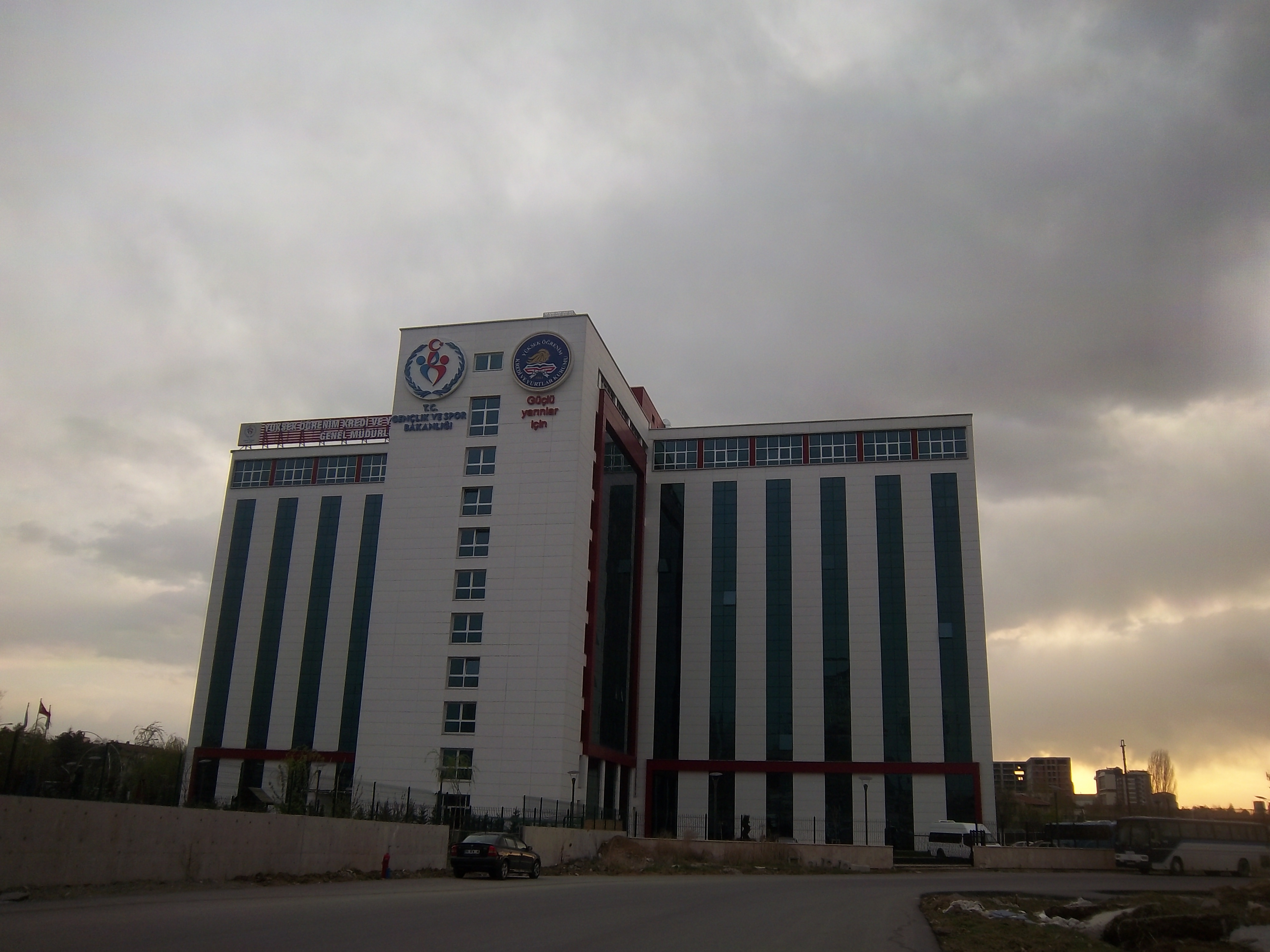

Agency overview
- Formed: 1969
- Headquarters: Örnek Mah. Oruç Reis Cad. 13; Altındağ, Ankara
- Minister responsible: Osman Aşkın Bak
- Deputy Ministers responsible: Enes Eminoğlu; Halis Yunus Ersöz; Hamza Yerlikaya; Safa Koçoğlu
- Website: www.gsb.gov.tr

The Ministry of Youth and Sports of the Republic of Turkey (Turkish: Türkiye Cumhuriyeti Gençlik ve Spor Bakanlığı) is a governmental agency within the Cabinet of Turkey in charge of regulating activities related to sports and youth development in Republic of Turkey. The ministry is headed by Osman Aşkın Bak.

== History ==
On 29 June 1938, the Directoriate of Physical Education was established. Following the 1969 general election, in the Cabinet Süleyman Demirel II, the Ministry of Youth and Sports was formed on 3 November for the first time, and İsmet Sezgin was appointed as its first minister. After the 1983 general election, the ministry was renamed National Education, Youth and Sports on 14 December.

The Ministry of Youth and Sports was re-established as an independent ministry on 29 June 2011 after the forming of Cabinet Erdoğan III. In the past, the governmental activities on youth and sports affairs were carried out by different governmental agencies subordinated to a state minister, who had also other responsibilities. Those organizations were brought together under the umbrella of the newly established ministry while the status of the provincial organizations were redefined in accordance with the alignment of the acquis for Accession of Turkey to the European Union.

== See also ==
- Cabinet of Turkey
- Sport in Turkey
- List of ministers of Youth and Sports of Turkey
- List of sports governing bodies in Turkey
