= Doyuran, Kızıltepe =

Village in Mardin Province, Turkey

Doyuran
- Neighbourhood
- Location in Turkey
- Coordinates: 37.122°N 40.637°E
- Country: Turkey
- Province: Mardin
- District: Kızıltepe
- Population (2021): 480
- Time zone: UTC+3 (TRT)

Doyuran (Kurdish: Teltaim) is a neighbourhood in the municipality and district of Kızıltepe, Mardin Province in Turkey. The village is populated by Kurds of the Kîkan tribe and had a population of 480 in 2021.
