= Oya Araslı =

Female Turkish academic and politician (born 1943)

Vice group chairperson of CHP
- In office 1996–1999

Secretary general of CHP
- In office 2000–2000

Personal details
- Born: Oya Tezel; 1943 (age 82–83) Bursa, Turkey
- Party: Republican People's Party (CHP)
- Spouse: Doğan Araslı
- Education: Law
- Alma mater: Istanbul University Faculty of Law; Ankara University Faculty of Law
- Occupation: Academic, politician

Oya Araslı (born in 1943) is a female Turkish academic and politician. She was born in Bursa to Kemal and Naciye Tezel. After studying at Faculty of Law in the Istanbul University she earned a doctorate at the Faculty of Law in Ankara University. She chose academic career and became the professor of constitution. Her husband was Doğan Araslı (died in 1990), a well known politician in Republican People's Party (CHP).

== Oya Araslı in politics ==
After CHP was reestablished, Oya Araslı became a member of the party. Between 8 January 1996 - 18 April 1999 she was elected as an MP from Mersin Province. Although she was offered a candidateship for the next election held on 18 April 1999, she declined the offer protesting the party policy towards the female candidates. (Nevertheless, in the elections, her party was unable to receive more than 10% of the votes which is required to qualify to participate in the parliament.) Her second term in parliament began in 2002. Between 14 November 2002 - 22 July 2007 Oya Araslı was elected as an MP from Ankara Province.

According to the Turkish constitution, each party with over twenty seats form a parliamentary group and each group is represented by 1-3 group vice chairpersons (Turkish: grup başkan vekili) who are authorized to represent, the relevant party in the parliament. In her first term Oya Araslı served as a group vice chairperson of her party. Thus she became the very first female group vice chairperson in Turkey. In 2000 during the period in which her party was out of the parliament she briefly served as the secretary general of her party.
