= Ahmet Alkan =

Turkish economist and academic

Ahmet Ugur Alkan
- Occupations: economist and academic

Ahmet Ugur Alkan is a Turkish economist and the former dean of Faculty of Arts and Social Sciences at Sabancı University, Istanbul, Turkey. Alkan is a member of the Turkish Academy of Sciences.
