= Halil İbrahim Özsoy =

Turkish politician (1938–2018)

Minister of Health
- In office 30 June 1997 – 11 January 1999
- Prime Minister: Mesut Yılmaz
- Preceded by: Halil İbrahim Özsoy
- Succeeded by: Osman Durmuş

Personal details
- Born: 27 October 1938
- Died: 14 August 2018 (aged 79) Afyonkarahisar, Turkey
- Party: Motherland Party
- Education: Medicine
- Alma mater: Ege University

Halil İbrahim Özsoy (27 October 1938 – 14 August 2018) was a Turkish politician. He served as the Minister of Health between 1997 and 1999.

He graduated from Ege University's Faculty of Medicine. He was a specialist in mental and neurological sciences. He was the Chief Medical Officer of Afyon State Hospital. Özsoy served as deputy from Afyon in the 19th, 20th and 21st parliamentary periods. He was married and had three children. He was the Chairman of the Motherland Party. He struggled with cancer for 3 years before he died.

Political offices
Preceded by İsmail Karakuyu	Minister of Health; 30 June 1997–11 January 1999	Succeeded by Mustafa Güven Karahan
