= Oğuz Tezmen =

Turkish politician

- Born: 1948 (age 77–78); Istanbul, Turkey
- Occupation: Politician

Oğuz Tezmen (born 1948 in Istanbul) is a Turkish politician. He was Minister of Transport and Communication in the 52nd government of Turkey and member of the 21st Parliament of Turkey.
