= Ayfer Yılmaz =

Turkish politician (born 1956)

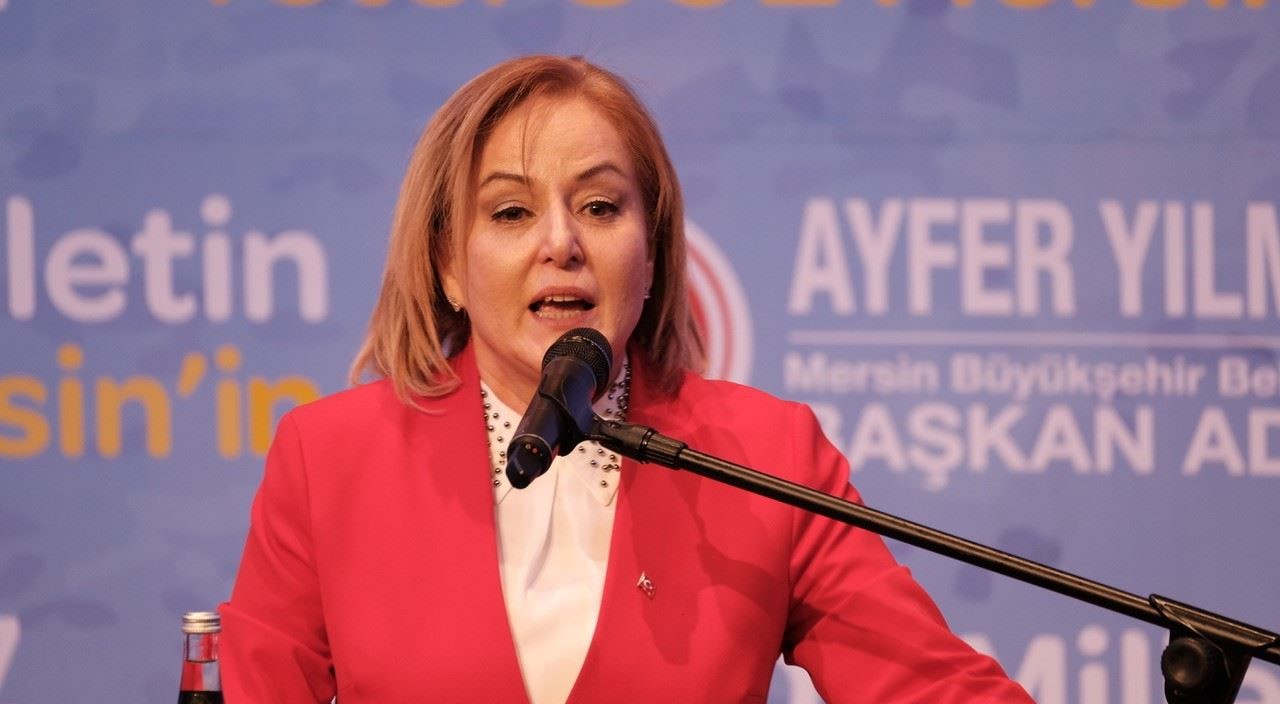

General Secretary of Good Party
- In office 4 July 2023 – 3 May 2024
- Leader: Meral Akşener
- Preceded by: Uğur Poyraz
- Succeeded by: Uğur Poyraz

Minister of State
- In office 6 March 1996 – 30 June 1997
- Prime Minister: Mesut Yılmaz; Necmettin Erbakan

Member of the Grand National Assembly
- In office 8 January 1996 – 1 October 2002
- Constituency: Mersin (1995, 1999)

Personal details
- Born: July 24, 1956 (age 70) Ankara, Turkey
- Party: Good Party (İYİ) (2017-2019, 2022-present)
- Other political affiliations: True Path Party (DYP) (1995-2007); Independent (2007-2017); Democrat Party (DP) (2019-2022)
- Education: Political science
- Alma mater: Faculty of Political Science, Ankara University
- Occupation: Civil servant, politician

Ayfer Yılmaz (born July 24, 1956) is a Turkish former high-level civil servant, a politician and former government minister.

== Private life ==
Ayfer Yılmaz was born in Ankara, Turkey on July 24, 1956. After completing the high school, she studied at Ankara University graduating from the Faculty of Political Science.

She is mother of one.

== Civil servant ==
Her first occupation was deputy consultant for Economy and Trade at the Turkish Embassy in Bonn, Federal Republic of Germany. She was then assigned to the Undersecretariat of Treasury to serve as the Director General of Public Finance Department, Deputy Undersecretary, and finally as the Undersecretary, the head of the administration. Her following occupations were chairperson of the board at the Turkish branches of World Bank, Asian Development Bank, European Bank for Reconstruction and Development and Islamic Development Bank.

== Politician ==
Yılmaz entered politics from the True Path Party (DYP). On the 1995 general election, she was elected into the 20th Parliament of Turkey as a deputy of Mersin Province. In the 1999 general election, she was re-elected. She served as Minister of State in the 53rd (6 March 1996 – 28 June 1996) and 54th governments (28 June 1996 – 30 June 1997).

== Consultant ==
Between 2002 and 2009, Yılmaz was the secretary general of the Strategic Research Center at the Başkent University in Ankara.She served as the member of the advisory board of the International Relations Department at the Okan University in Istanbul.

== Back to politics ==
In October 2017, Yılmaz joined the founders of the Good Party led by Meral Akşener. She is a member of the board of founders undertaking the portfolio of "International Relations".

Political offices
Preceded by	Minister of State; 6 March 1996 – 30 June 1997	Succeeded by
