= Osman Durmuş =

Turkish politician (1947–2020)

Minister of Health
- In office 28 May 1999 – 18 November 2002
- Prime Minister: Bulent Ecevit
- Preceded by: Mustafa Güven Karahan
- Succeeded by: Recep Akdağ

Personal details
- Born: 5 August 1947 Çankırı, Turkey
- Died: 26 October 2020 (aged 73) Çankaya, Ankara, Turkey
- Resting place: Karşıyaka Cemetery
- Party: Nationalist Movement Party

Osman Durmuş (5 August 1947 – 26 October 2020) was a Turkish physician and politician.

== Career ==
Durmuş was a member of parliament for the Nationalist Movement Party (MHP) from 1999 to 2002, serving as the Minister of Health. He was on the faculty of Gazi University, becoming associate professor in 1990 and full professor in 2003, after the MHP failed to reach the 10% threshold in the 2002 elections. He was elected again in 2007, representing the Kırıkkale electoral district.

== Death ==
Durmuş died in Ankara following a brain hemorrhage on 26 October 2020. He was buried at Karşıyaka Cemetery the following day, after a state funeral was held.

Political offices
Preceded by Mustafa Güven Karahan	Minister of Health; 28 May 1999–18 November 2002	Succeeded by Recep Akdağ
