= Mustafa Güven Karahan =

Turkish politician

Minister of Health
- In office 11 January 1999 – 28 May 1999
- Prime Minister: Bülent Ecevit
- Preceded by: Halil İbrahim Özsoy
- Succeeded by: Osman Durmuş

Personal details
- Born: 1943 Kastamonu, Turkey
- Died: 2 September 2013 (aged 69–70) Bandırma, Turkey
- Party: Democratic Left Party (1995–2002)
- Education: Medicine
- Alma mater: Istanbul University

Mustafa Güven Karahan (1943 – 2 September 2013) was a Turkish politician. He served as the Minister of Health in 1999.

Karahan graduated from Istanbul University's Cerrahpaşa Medical Faculty. He completed his thesis at Hacettepe University's Faculty of Medicine. He worked as the Urology department of the Bandırma State Hospital. He served as the deputy of Balıkesir in the 20th and 21st terms. Karahan was married and had two children.

Political offices
Preceded by Halil İbrahim Özsoy	Minister of Health; 11 January 1999–28 May 1999	Succeeded by Osman Durmuş
