= Kubilay Uygun =

Turkish politician

Kubilay Uygun (born 1955 in Ankara—died in 2016 Afyon) was a Turkish politician known for switching parties during his single term in parliament (1995 - 1999). In one month (July 1996) he had left his original Democratic Left Party (DSP) for the center-right True Path Party (DYP), rejoined the Democratic Left, and rejoined True Path. By the end of his term he had represented four different parties, finishing as an independent.

== Background ==
Uygun was born in Ankara in 1955, the son of Orhan Uygun, a Democrat Party deputy imprisoned for several years after the 1960 Turkish coup d'état.

== Career ==
Uygun was a member of the ultra-nationalist Grey Wolves. In the 1980s he represented the True Path Party at local level, before switching to the Motherland Party (ANAP) in 1989. Uygun then ran for mayor of Sinanpaşa in 1994 on the ticket of the Republic People's Party.

Uygun was elected in 1995 to the Grand National Assembly of Turkey for the Democratic Left Party (DSP), winning his seat with 31,000 votes as the Nationalist Movement Party (MHP) failed to reach the 10% threshold nationally, disqualifying the local candidate who had gained 39,000 votes. Uygun began switching parties six months after he was elected, as the governing coalition collapsed. In one month (July 1996) he had left the Democratic Left for the center-right True Path Party (DYP), rejoined the Democratic Left, and rejoined True Path. A year later he briefly switched to the far-right Nationalist Movement Party (MHP), switching again to a newly created fourth party, the Democrat Turkey Party (DTP) a month later. The MHP had referred Uygun to a disciplinary board after he had supported the government in a no-confidence vote, instead of abstaining as asked. After he resigned from the DTP in June 1998, Parliament opened an investigation on charges of making a mockery of Parliament.

== List of switches in parliament ==
- 3 July 1996: resigned from DSP (after election on 24 December 1995); 4 July 1996: joined the DYP.
- 6 July 1996: resigned from DYP; 8 July 1996: re-joined DSP.
- 30 July 1996: resigned from DSP; re-joined the DYP.
- 27 June 1997: resigned from DYP; joined MHP.
- 18 July 1997: resigned from MHP.
- 28 December 1997: joined the DTP.
- 10 June 1998: resigned from DTP.
