= Hüseyin Yıldız (politician, born 1953) =

Turkish politician

- Born: 1953 (age 72–73); Teltaim, Turkey
- Education: Istanbul Higher Islamic Institute
- Occupations: Politician, schoolteacher
- Spouse: married
- Children: 4

Hüseyin Yıldız (born 1953, Teltaim) is a Turkish politician.

Hüseyin Yıldız is a graduate of Istanbul Higher Islamic Institute and Ankara Foreign Languages Education Center. He worked as a teacher in Mardin Imam Hatip High School. He served as a deputy from Mardin and a secretary member on Bureau of the Assembly during the 20th Parliament of Turkey. He is married and has four children.
