= Ömer Barutçu =

Turkish politician (1942–2024)

Minister of Transport
- In office 6 March 1996 – 30 June 1997
- President: Suleyman Demirel
- Preceded by: Oğuz Tezmen
- Succeeded by: Necdet Menzir

Minister responsible for Youth and Sport
- In office 30 October 1995 – 6 March 1996
- President: Suleyman Demirel
- Preceded by: Şükrü Erdem
- Succeeded by: Ersin Taranoğlu

Member of the Grand National Assembly of Turkey for Zonguldak
- In office 14 December 1987 – 1 October 2002
- In office 13 June 1977 – 12 September 1980

Personal details
- Born: 1942 Beşikdüzü, Turkey
- Died: 2 December 2024 (aged 82)
- Party: AP; DYP
- Education: Ankara Hacı Bayram Veli University
- Occupation: Economist

Ömer Barutçu (1942 – 2 December 2024) was a Turkish economist and politician.

== Biography ==
A member of the Justice Party and later the True Path Party, he served in the Grand National Assembly from 1977 to 1980 and again from 1987 to 2002, was Minister responsible for Youth and Sport from 1995 to 1996, and was minister of transport from 1996 to 1997.

Barutçu died on 2 December 2024, at the age of 82. Two days later, he was buried at Karşıyaka Cemetery in Ankara.
