= Agah Oktay Güner =

Turkish politician and journalist (born 1937)

Minister of Culture and Tourism
- In office 67 March 1967 – 67 June 1967
- Prime Minister: Mesut Yılmaz
- Preceded by: Fikri Sağlar
- Succeeded by: İsmail Kahraman

Minister of Trade
- In office 21 July 1977 – 5 January 1978
- Prime Minister: Süleyman Demirel
- Preceded by: Ziya Müezzinoğlu
- Succeeded by: Teoman Köprülüler

Personal details
- Born: 21 June 1937 Bayburt, Turkey
- Died: 8 September 2025 (aged 88)
- Party: Democrat Party (2011–2025)
- Other political affiliations: Nationalist Movement Party (1977–1980); Motherland Party (1995–2001); True Path Party (2001–2002)
- Children: 5
- Education: Ankara University; University of Paris

Agah Oktay Güner (21 June 1937 – 8 September 2025) was a Turkish journalist and politician who held various cabinet posts and served in different parties, including Nationalist Movement Party, Motherland Party and True Path Party.

== Early life and education ==
Güner was born in Bayburt in 1937. He graduated from Konya High School. He received a degree in law from Ankara University and obtained his PhD in economics from the University of Paris. His PhD thesis was about economic state enterprises and economic development.

During his university studies in Ankara Güner began his political activity in 1954 being a member of the nationalist youth group Turkish Hearths.

== Career and activities ==
Güner became a member of the conservative think tank called Thinkers Club (Turkish: Aydınlar Kulübü) in 1962 which was the precursor of the Intellectuals' Hearth (Turkish: Aydınlar Ocağı). He worked at different public institutions. In 1977 he joined the Nationalist Movement Party. He was first elected to the Parliament in 1977 and served as the deputy of Konya in the 16th term. In the 41st government he was the minister of commerce between 21 July 1977 and 5 January 1978. Following the 1980 coup in Turkey he was arrested and sentenced to death. He later was acquitted and released from the prison.

Güner joined the Motherland Party and was elected to the Parliament in 1995 serving as a deputy of Ankara in the 20th term. In the 53rd government he was the minister of culture between 6 March and 28 June 1996. In 1999 he was elected as a deputy from Balıkesir and served in the 21st term of the Parliament. In 2002 he resigned from the Motherland Party and joined the True Path Party.

Güner was among the contributors of the newspapers Tercüman ve Türkiye. He was one of the writers of Yeniçağ newspaper.

=== Views ===
Güner was among the critics of the language simplification carried out by Mustafa Kemal Atatürk in 1926. He argued that Turkish youth had problems in understanding the Ottoman texts. After Güner was released from prison he stated "we are in prison, yet our ideology is in government" referring to both his colleagues who were still in the prison and the Turkish government which had been implementing nationalist policies closely similar to those of the National Movement Party.

Güner was one of the followers of the Rifaʽi order.

== Personal life ==
Güner was married and had five children.
