= Eyüp Aşık =

Turkish politician (born 1953)

Eyüp Aşık (born 1953, Çaykara) is a former Turkish politician. He represented Trabzon in the Grand National Assembly of Turkey for the Motherland Party (ANAP) from 1983 to 2001. In the mid-1990s he was a minister of state responsible for Tekel.

== Career ==
Aşık was elected to the Grand National Assembly of Turkey in 1983 for the Motherland Party (ANAP) party, and was re-elected repeatedly. In the mid-1990s he was a minister of state responsible for Tekel, and a member of a 1993 - 1995 parliamentary commission to research killings by unknown perpetrators (faili meçhul cinayetleri araştırma komisyonu). He resigned his seat as deputy and his position as minister of state on 16 November 1998, after allegations (which Aşık denied) of a relationship with mob boss Alaattin Çakıcı. In February 1999 he was acquitted on charges of aiding the mafia.

Aşık was re-elected to parliament in the 1999 elections. He defected from ANAP to the DYP in 2001, but failed to win a seat in the 2002 elections. He was a Democratic Party candidate in the 2007 elections.
