= Ayvaz Gökdemir =

Turkish politician

Ayvaz Gökdemir (1942 in Gaziantep, Turkey – 19 April 2008 in Ankara) was a Turkish politician, deputy for three terms (between 1991 and 2002) and minister in four governments (between 1993 and 1996).

He was born in Gaziantep in 1942. He received a teacher's training, after which he attended Ankara University. He pursued his career as a teacher in Kayseri and Ankara, participated in the editing of the Turkish Encyclopedia, was known for his nationalist views, (Note: Whence his nickname stuck on him since his teacher's days: Komando Ayvaz" - "Ayvaz the Commando") and in 1991, was elected as deputy from the True Path Party, led by Demirel at the time.

In a memorable episode, he caused much controversy and acquired international notoriety in June 1995, when he reacted to the declarations made by three female parliamentarians of the European Parliament on visit to Turkey (Pauline Green, the then leader of the Party of European Socialists, Catherine Lalumière, representing the European Radical Alliance, and Claudia Roth, the chairperson of the Green Group at the time), by qualifying the deputies as "prostitutes coming from Europe".

While some viewed his tone as unbecoming for someone who had reached the position of a minister, others explained it by "a sort of disgust and scepticism towards Europe, constantly present among the Turkish elite" and evaluated it within the frame of the freedom of expression. Among the three parliamentarians, Claudia Roth took judicial action against Gökdemir, who had to pay an indemnity as a consequence of the court's verdict.
