= Parliamentary terms of Turkey =

Below is the list of the Parliamentary terms of Turkey from 1920 onwards. The duration of each term is marked by the corresponding election, except for the ending of the 11th and 16th parliamentary terms which ended as a result of the coups of 1960 and 1980 respectively.

No	From	To	Cabinets	Speaker of the Parliament
1	23 April 1920	28 June 1923	I, II, III, IV, V	Mustafa Kemal Atatürk
2	11 August 1923	1 November 1927	1st, 2nd, 3rd, 4th	Mustafa Kemal Atatürk, Ali Fethi Okyar, Kazım Özalp (Note: Republic was proclaimed on 29 October 1923. Mustafa Kemal's term as the speaker ended on this date)
3	1 November 1927	4 May 1931	5th, 6th	Kazım Özalp
4	4 May 1931	1 May 1935	7th	Kazım Özalp
5	1 May 1935	3 April 1939	8th, 9th, 10th	Abdülhalik Renda
6	3 April 1939	8 March 1943	11th, 12th, 13th	Abdülhalik Renda
7	8 March 1943	5 August 1946	14th	Abdülhalik Renda
8	5 August 1946	14 May 1950	15th, 16th, 17th, 18th	Kazım Karabekir, Ali Fuat Cebesoy, Şükrü Saracoğlu
9	14 May 1950	2 May 1954	19th, 20th	Refik Koraltan
10	2 May 1954	27 October 1957	21st, 22nd	Refik Koraltan
11	27 October 1957	27 May 1960	23rd	Refik Koraltan
—	6 January 1961	15 October 1961	24th, 25th	Kâzım Orbay
12	15 October 1961	10 October 1965	26th, 27th, 28th, 29th	Fuat Sirmen
13	10 October 1965	12 October 1969	30th	Ferruh Bozbeyli
14	12 October 1969	14 October 1973	31st, 32nd, 33rd, 34th, 35th, 36th	Ferruh Bozbeyli, Sabit Osman Avcı
15	14 October 1973	5 June 1977	37th, 38th, 39th	Kemal Güven
16	5 June 1977	12 September 1980	40th, 41st, 42nd, 43rd	Cahit Karakaş
—	15 October 1981	6 November 1983	44th	Sadi Irmak
17	6 November 1983	29 November 1987	45th	Necmettin Karaduman
18	29 December 1987	20 October 1991	46th, 47th, 48th	Yıldırım Akbulut, Kaya Erdem
19	20 October 1991	24 December 1995	49th, 50th, 51st, 52nd	Hüsamettin Cindoruk, İsmet Sezgin
20	24 December 1995	18 April 1999	53rd, 54th, 55th, 56th	Mustafa Kalemli, Hikmet Çetin
21	18 April 1999	3 November 2002	57th	Yıldırım Akbulut, Ömer İzgi
22	14 November 2002	22 July 2007	58th, 59th	Bülent Arınç
23	4 August 2007	12 June 2011	60th	Köksal Toptan, Mehmet Ali Şahin
24	28 June 2011	7 June 2015	61st, 62nd	Cemil Çiçek
25	7 June 2015	17 November 2015	63rd	İsmet Yılmaz
26	17 November 2015	7 July 2018	64th, 65th	İsmail Kahraman
27	7 July 2018	7 April 2023	66th	Binali Yıldırım, Mustafa Şentop
28	2 June 2023	Incumbent	67th	Numan Kurtulmuş
