= 15th Parliament of Turkey =

The 15th Grand National Assembly of Turkey existed from 14 October 1973 to 5 June 1977. There were 450 MPs in the lower house. Republican People's Party (CHP) held the plurality. Justice Party (AP) was the next party. National Salvation Party (MSP), Democratic Party (DP), Republican Reliance Party (CGP), Nationalist Movement Party (MHP) Turkey Unity Party (TBP) were the other parties.

== Main parliamentary milestones ==
Some of the important events in the history of the parliament are the following:

- 7 November 1973 – Bülent Ecevit of CHP could not form a government
- 17 November 1973 – Süleyman Demirel of AP could not form a government
- 18 December 1973 – Kemal Güven of CHP was elected as the speaker of the Turkish parliament after 27 rounds
- 19 January 1974 – Naim Talu, a former prime minister could not form a government
- 26 January 1974 - Bülent Ecevit formed the 37th government of Turkey (a coalition of CHP and MSP)
- 14 May 1974 - Amnesty law; disagreement between the coalition partners
- 11 July 1974 – Parliament discussed the Cyprus issue
- 17 Noıvember 1974 – Sadi Irmak, an independent senator, formed the 38th government of Turkey
- 29 November 1974 – Failing to receive the vote of confidence Sadi Irmak resigned; beginning of a long government crisis
- 1 April 1975 - Süleyman Demirel of AP formed the 39th government of Turkey; a coalition government usually called First National Front ( 1.MC), the partners being MSP, CGP and MHP.
- 7 June 1977 - General elections

Preceded by 14th Parliament of Turkey	15th Parliament of Turkey; Kemal Güven; 14 October 1973-5 June 1977	Succeeded by 16th Parliament of Turkey
