= 14th Parliament of Turkey =

The 14th Grand National Assembly of Turkey existed from 11 October 1969 to 14 October 1973. There were 450 MPs in the lower house. Justice Party (AP) held the majority and the Republican People's Party (CHP) was the main opposition. Reliance Party (GP), Unity Party, Nation Party (MP), New Turkey Party (YTP) and the Workers Party of Turkey (TİP) were the other opposition Parties

== Main parliamentary milestones ==
Some of the important events in the history of the parliament are the following:

- 2 November 1969 – Süleyman Demirel of AP formed the 31st government of Turkey
- 26 January- Necmettin Erbakan founded the National Order Party (MNP)
- 11 February – Parliament voted against the budget act
- 3 March – Süleyman Demirel formed the 32nd government of Turkey
- 18 December – Democratic Party (DP) was formed by the 26 MPs who issued from AP. Ferruh Bozbeyli the former speaker of the parliament became the chairman of the party
- 12 March 1971 – After widespread chaos the commanders of the armed forces forced the government to resign. But the parliament continued (see 1971 Turkish coup d'état )
- 26 March 1971 – Nihat Erim who had recently resigned from CHP membership formed the 33rd government of Turkey
- 27 August 1971- Amendment in the constitution
- 3 December 1971 – 11 government ministers (like Atilla Karaosmanoğlu) resigned from their posts claiming that they were unable to carry on the reforms they had promised
- 5 December 1971 - Nihat Erim formed the 34th government of Turkey
- 15 May 1972 – Ferit Melen of National Reliance Party (MGP) (former GP) formed the 35th government of Turkey
- 4 September 1972 – Kemal Satır and friends who recently issued or expelled from CHP founded Republican Party (CP)
- 28 February 1973- CP merged to MGP
- 5 April 1973 - Fahri Korutürk was elected as the 6th president of Turkey
- 15 April 1973 – Independent senator Naim Talu formed the 36th government of Turkey
- 14 Ostober 1973 –General elections

Preceded by 13th Parliament of Turkey	14th Parliament of Turkey; Ferruh Bozbeyli; Sabit Osman Avcı; 11 October 1969-14 October 1973	Succeeded by 15th Parliament of Turkey
