= 1973 Turkish Senate election =

Election

Senate elections were held in Turkey on 14 October 1973 on the same day as for the lower house. In this election 52 members of the Senate were elected; 50 members for one-third of the Senate and two vacant seats.

== Results ==
Party	Votes	%	Seats
Republican People's Party	1,412,051	33.61	25
Justice Party	1,300,801	30.96	22
National Salvation Party	516,822	12.30	3
Democratic Party	438,276	10.43	0
Republican Reliance Party	246,888	5.88	1
Nationalist Movement Party	114,662	2.73	0
Unity Party	89,824	2.14	0
Independents	82,233	1.96	1
Total	4,201,557	100.00	52
Valid votes	4,201,557	95.21	
Invalid/blank votes	211,170	4.79	
Total votes	4,412,727	100.00	
Registered voters/turnout	6,761,157	65.27	
Source: Nohlen et al.
