= 1973 Turkish presidential election =

Election of Fahri Korutürk

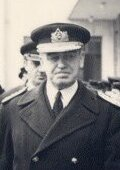
| Candidate | Fahri Korutürk | Ferruh Bozbeyli |
| Party | Independent | Democratic Party |
| Electoral vote | 365 | 51 |
| Percentage | 57.5% | 8% |
President before election
Cevdet Sunay
Independent
President
Fahri Korutürk
Independent

The 1973 Turkish presidential election was held starting on March 13, 1973 and continuing for 15 rounds before a candidate could be selected by at least half of the votes cast. It resolved on April 6, 1973 on the 15th ballot, when 557 out of 635 deputies participated in the voting and Republican Senator Fahri Korutürk was elected President with 365 votes.

== Background ==
The duty term of the 6th president of Turkey Cevdet Sunay ended on 28 March 1973. The new president was to be elected among the parliament members (lower and upper houses). According to the Turkish Constitution of 1961, at least 423 votes (2/3 of the total) during the first two election cycles and at least 318 votes (1/2 of the total) during the later cycles were required. However, these figures were higher than the number of MPs of any single party. Thus the party leaders looked for a compromise on an impartial name. The candidate had to be a member of the parliament. Thus the most probable candidates were the members of a special group of 15 impartial senators appointed by the president known as Kontenjan senatörü ("The senator of the quota").

== Faruk Gürler, Tekin Arıburnu, Ferruh Bozbeyli ==
Faruk Gürler the chief of staff resigned from his post on 5 March to enter the parliament as a member of the upper house. Cevdet Sunat appointed him as a senator and he became a candidate. But he couldn't get enough support. Because while most of the Republican People's Party (CHP) MPs boycotted the election, the Justice Party (AP) supported Tekin Arıburun, a member of the party and the Democratic Party supported its leader Ferruh Bozbeyli. None of the candidates could receive enough votes. On 20 March both Gürler and Arıburnu withdraw their candidature. Although Bozbeyli continued, he couldn't increase his support.

== Second term for Cevdet Sunay ==
Failing to reach a compromise, AP decided to amend the constitution to prolong the duty term of Cevdet Sunay and CHP agreed. But İsmet İnönü the second president of Turkey and the former leader of the CHP as well as Turhan Feyzioğlu, the leader of the Republican Reliance Party opposed the amendment and the amendment was rejected.

== Muhittin Taylan ==
Another proposed name was that of Muhittin Taylan, chief of the Constitutional Court of Turkey. However, he was not an MP and Cevdet Sunay refused to appoint him to the senate.

== Fahri Korutürk ==
Süleyman Demirel of the AP and Bülent Ecevit of the CHP met and Demirel proposed three names all of which were the senators of the quata. Among these names Ecevit agreed on the name of Fahri Korutürk. Korutürk, a former admiral and a diplomat, was a senator of the quata since 1968. Finally he was elected after the 15th cycle on 6 April by 365 votes. His sole competitor Bozbeyli received only a modest 51 votes.
