= 16th Parliament of Turkey =

The 16th Grand National Assembly of Turkey existed from 5 June 1977 to 12 September 1980. There were 450 MPs in the lower house. Republican People's Party (CHP) held the plurality. Justice Party (AP) was the next party. National Salvation Party (MSP), Nationalist Movement Party (MHP), Republican Reliance Party and Democratic Party (DP) were the other parties.

== Main parliamentary milestones ==
Some of the important events in the history of the parliament are the following:

- 21 June 1977 – Bülent Ecevit of CHP formed the 40th government of Turkey
- 3 July 1977 – The government couldn't receive the vote of confidence
- 21 July 1977 – Süleyman Demirel of AP formed the 41st government of Turkey, a coalition of AP, MSP, CGP and MHP so-called Second National Front
- 17 November 1977 – Following a crisis of 6 months, Cahit Karakaş of CHP was elected as the speaker of the parliament
- 31 December 1977 – Non confidence vote following interpellation
- 5 January 1978 – Bülent Ecevit formed the 42nd government of Turkey; a coalition of CHP, CGP, DP and the independents
- 12 November 1979 – Süleyman Demirel formed the 43rd government of Turkey; a minority government with external support
- 7 April 1980 – Fahri Korutürk, the sixth president of Turkey left the office after his 7-year legal term of office. His post was not filled till 12 September. İhsan Sabri Çağlayangil became the acting president
- 12 September 1980 – 1980 Turkish coup d'état

Preceded by 15th Parliament of Turkey	16th Parliament of Turkey; Cahit Karakaş; 5 June 1977 – 12 September 1980	Succeeded by Advisory Parliament of Turkey (Note: Including MGK period)
