= 1977 Turkish Senate election =

Senate elections were held in Turkey on 5 June 1977, on the same day as for the lower house. In this election 50 members – one-third – of the Senate were elected.

== Results ==
Party	Votes	%	Seats
Republican People's Party	2,037,875	42.35	28
Justice Party	1,842,396	38.28	21
National Salvation Party	402,702	8.37	1
Nationalist Movement Party	326,967	6.79	0
Democratic Party	107,278	2.23	0
Republican Reliance Party	89,484	1.86	0
Independents	5,624	0.12	0
Total	4,812,326	100.00	50
Valid votes	4,812,326	95.98	
Invalid/blank votes	201,351	4.02	
Total votes	5,013,677	100.00	
Registered voters/turnout	6,800,746	73.72	
Source: Nohlen et al.
