= 39th government of Turkey =

Government of the Republic of Turkey (1975-1977)

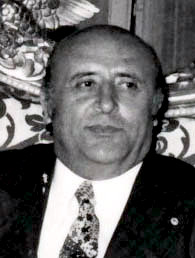
Süleyman Demirel, 1976

The 39th government of Turkey (31 March 1975 – 21 June 1977) was a historical government of Turkey. It is also called the fourth Demirel cabinet and First Nationalist Front.

== Background ==
After Bülent Ecevit of the Republican People's Party (CHP), who was the prime minister of the 37th government, resigned, Turkey experienced a period of cabinet crises. During a period of more than four months, the government was a caretakers government led by Sadi Irmak. Finally, four parties formed the 39th government. The prime minister was Süleyman Demirel, the leader of Justice Party (AP). Other partners were National Salvation Party (MSP), Republican Reliance Party (CGP), and Nationalist Movement Party (MHP).

== The government ==
In the list below, the serving period of cabinet members who served only a part of the cabinet's lifespan are shown in the column "Notes". According to the Turkish constitution some members of the government were replaced by independent members before the elections.

Title	Name	Party	Notes
Prime Minister	Süleyman Demirel	AP	
Deputy Prime Minister
Deputy Prime Minister	Necmettin Erbakan	MSP	
Deputy Prime Minister	Turhan Feyzioğlu	CGP	
Deputy Prime Minister	Alparslan Türkeş	MHP	
Minister of State
Minister of State	Seyfi Öztürk	AP	
Minister of State	Hasan Aksay	MSP	
Minister of State	Mustafa Kemal Erkovan; Osman Albayrak	MHP; AP	31 March 1975 – 30 April 1977; 30 April 1977 – 21 June 1977
Minister of State	Gıyasettin Karaca	AP	
Ministry of Justice	İsmail Müftüoğlu; Zeyyat Baykara	MSP; Indep	31 March 1975 – 11 April 1977; 11 April 1977 – 21 June 1977
Ministry of National Defense	Ferit Melen	CGP	
Ministry of the Interior	Oğuzhan Asiltürk; Sabahattin Özbek	MSP; Indep	31 March 1975 – 11 April 1977; 11 April 1977 – 21 June 1977
Ministry of Foreign Affairs	İhsan Sabri Çağlayangil	AP	
Ministry of Finance	Yılmaz Ergenekon	AP	
Ministry of National Education	Ali Naili Erdem	AP	
Ministry of Public Works	Fehim Adak	MSP	
Ministry of Commerce	Halil Başol	AP	
Ministry of Health and Social Security	Kemal Demir; Vefa Tanır	CGP	31 March 1975 – 19 April 1977; 19 April 1977 – 21 June 1977
Ministry of Customs and Monopolies	Orhan Öztrak	CGP	
Ministry Food, Agriculture and Animal Husbandry	Korkut Özal		
Ministry of Transport	Nahit Menteşe; İbrahim Aysoy	AP; Indep	31 March 1975 – 11 April 1977; 11 April 1977 – 21 June 1977
Ministry of Labour	Ahmet Tevfik Paksu; Şevket Kazan	MSP	31 March 1975 – 10 November 1976; 16 November 1976 – 21 June 1977
Ministry of Social Security	Ahmet Mahir Ablum	AP	
Ministry of Industry and Technology	Abdülkerim Doğru	MSP	
Ministry Tourism	Lütfi Tokoğlu; Nahit Menteşe	AP	31 March 1975 – 11 April 1977; 11 April 1977 – 21 June 1977
Ministry Culture	Rıfkı Danışman	AP	
Ministry of Construction and Settlement	Nurettin Ok	AP	
Ministry of Energy and Natural Resources	Selahattin Kılıç	AP	
Ministry of Village Affairs	Vefa Poyraz	AP	
Ministry of Forestry	Turhan Kapanlı	AP	
Ministry of Youth and Sports	Ali Şevki Erek	AP	

== Aftermath ==
The government ended with the general elections held on 5 June 1977.

Preceded by 38th government of Turkey (Sadi Irmak)	39th Government of Turkey; 31 March 1975 – 21 June 1977	Succeeded by 40th government of Turkey (Bülent Ecevit)
