= Turhan Feyzioğlu =

Turkish politician

Deputy Prime Minister of Turkey
- In office 31 March 1975 – 21 June 1977
- Prime Minister: Süleyman Demirel
- Served with: Necmettin Erbakan; Alparslan Türkeş
- Preceded by: Zeyyat Baykara
- Succeeded by: Orhan Eyüboğlu
- In office 25 June 1962 – 25 December 1963
- Prime Minister: İsmet İnönü
- Serving with: Ekrem Alican; Hasan Dincer
- Preceded by: Ali Akif Eyidoğan
- Succeeded by: Kemal Satır

Minister of State
- In office 20 November 1961 – 25 June 1962
- Prime Minister: İsmet İnönü

Minister of National Education
- In office 5 January 1961 – 7 February 1961
- Prime Minister: Cemal Gürsel
- Preceded by: Bedrettin Tuncel
- Succeeded by: Ahmet Tahtakılıç

Leader of the Republican Reliance Party
- In office 4 May 1973 – 16 October 1981
- Preceded by: Himself (as leader of the National Reliance Party)
- Succeeded by: Party abolished

Leader of the National Reliance Party
- In office 29 January 1971 – 4 May 1973
- Preceded by: Himself (as leader of the Reliance Party)
- Succeeded by: Himself (as leader of the Republican Reliance Party)

Leader of the Reliance Party
- In office 12 May 1967 – 29 January 1971
- Preceded by: Party established
- Succeeded by: Himself (as leader of the National Reliance Party)

Member of the Grand National Assembly
- In office 27 October 1957 – 12 September 1980
- Constituency: Sivas (1957); Kayseri (1961, 1965, 1969, 1973, 1977)

Personal details
- Born: 1922 Kayseri, Turkey
- Died: 24 March 1988 (aged 65–66) Ankara, Turkey
- Party: Republican People's Party (CHP); Republican Reliance Party (CGP)
- Spouse: Leyla Cıngıllıoğlu
- Children: 2 (1 adopted)
- Relatives: Metin Feyzioğlu (grandson)
- Education: Galatasaray High School
- Alma mater: Istanbul University (LL.B.); Ankara University (Ph.D.)
- Occupation: Politician, academic
- Known for: Dean of Faculty of Political Science, Ankara University; Rector of Middle East Technical University

Turhan Feyzioğlu (1922 – 24 March 1988) was a Turkish academic and a politician.

== Early life ==
He was born in Kayseri. After finishing the primary school in Kayseri, he attended Galatasaray High School and later studied at Istanbul University Law School. After post graduate studies at the University of Oxford, he returned to Turkey and became a faculty at Ankara University. In 1947, he obtained his Ph.D. from Ankara University with a thesis entitled "Judicial Supervision of the Conformity of Laws to the Constitution in Turkey and Other Countries." During this period, he also translated Friedrich Hayek’s The Road to Serfdom.

During his tenure as an associate professor in the years 1953-1954, he was sent by the Faculty of Political Sciences of Ankara University to France and England for research. During this period, he worked at the École Nationale d'Administration in France. In 1955, at the age of 33, he was promoted to the rank of professor and was elected as the dean of the Faculty of Political Sciences of Ankara University. He also began writing in the bulletin of his school. His articles however irritated the Democrat Party government and he had to resign. Although in 1960–1961 term he briefly returned to academics and served as the rector of Middle East Technical University (METU) in Ankara, his main area of interest was politics.

== Politics in CHP ==
In 1957 he went into politics and became a member of Republican People's Party (CHP). In the same year he was elected as the MP from Sivas. In 1960 (during his service in METU) he also served in the constituent assembly and was appointed as the minister of education in Cabinet Gürsel I. In the elections held in 1961, he was elected as the MP from Kayseri, his home. He served in the two governments of İsmet İnönü In the first he served as state minister (French: ministre sans portefeuille) and in the second as deputy prime minister. Turhan Feyzioğlu was one of the major figures of the party. But beginning by 1965, Bülent Ecevit the secretary general of the party who had the support of İsmet İnönü began to challenge his authority in the party. Turhan Feyzioğlu actively opposed the policy termed "left of center" (Turkish: ortanın solu), advocated by Bülent Ecevit.

== Politics in Reliance Party ==
On 12 May 1967 Turhan Feyzioğlu and his 47 followers in the parliamentary group broke away from CHP to form a new party named Reliance Party. Feyzioğlu became the chairman of the new party. On 29 January 1971, the party was renamed as National Reliance Party and on 4 May 1973, Republican Party, another party also issued from CHP, merged to Nationalistic Reliance Party. After merging, the party was renamed as Republican Reliance Party. Turhan Feyzioğlu continued as the chairman of Republican Reliance Party.

== Politics in Republican Reliance Party ==
Republican Reliance Party continued up to 1980 and Turhan Feyzioğlu continued to be an MP from Kayseri. Although his party was losing support, Feyzioğlu served two times as deputy prime minister in coalition governments; in 1975 in Süleyman Demirel's cabinet and in 1978 Bülent Ecevit’s cabinet.

== Family life ==
Turhan Feyzioğlu married to Leyla Cıngıllıoğlu. Their daughter Saide (1950-1969) married Mehmet Buçukoğlu, but she died two hours after bearing a son, Metin, on 7 July 1969. Metin was adopted by his grandparents and took the surname Feyzioğlu. He became a professor of criminal law and was elected President of Turkish Bars Association in May 2013.

== Death ==
After 1980, he withdrew from political life. Turhan Feyzioğlu died at the age of 66 in Ankara on 24 March 1988.

== Books ==
The following list includes the books authored by Feyzioğlu. Of these, five are written in Turkish and one in French.

- Kanunların Anayasaya Uygunluğunun Kazai Murakabesi (1951)
- Demokrasiye ve Diktatörlüğe Dair (1957)
- Devlet Adamı Atatürk (1963)
- Atatürk ve Milliyetçilik
- Türk Millî Mücadelesinin ve Atatürkçülüğün Temel İlkelerinden Biri Olarak Millet Egemenliği
- Atatürk Yolu
- Un Liberateur et un Modernisateur Genial Kemal Atatürk

Preceded by Fehmi Yavuz	Minister of National Education; 5 January 1961 – 27 October 1961	Succeeded by Mehmet Hilmi İncesulu
Preceded by Hayri Mumcuğlu; Adnan Erzi; Sitkı Ulay; Ali Nasır Zeytinoğlu	Minister of State; 20 November 1961 – 25 June 1962	Succeeded by Hıfzı Oğuz Bekata; Şevket Raşit Hatiboğlu; Ali Şakir Ağanoğlu; Vefik Piriçcioğlu
Preceded by Akif Eyidoğan	Deputy Prime Minister of Turkey; 25 June 1962 – 25 December 1963	Succeeded by Kemal Satır
Preceded by Zeyyat Baykara	Deputy Prime Minister of Turkey; 31 March 1975 – 21 June 1977	Succeeded by Orhan Eyüboğlu; Turan Güneş
Preceded by Necmettin Erbakan; Alparslan Türkeş	Deputy Prime Minister of Turkey; 5 January 1978 – 12 November 1979	Succeeded by Vacant
