= Mustafa Ok =

Turkish politician

Minister of Village Affairs and Cooperatives
- In office 26 January 1973 – 17 November 1973
- Preceded by: Orhan Kürümoğlu
- Succeeded by: İsmail Hakkı Aydınoğlu
- Prime Minister: Bülent Ecevit

Personal details
- Born: 1925 Koldere, Saruhanlı, Manisa Province, Turkey
- Died: 5 January 2009 (aged 83–84) İzmir, Turkey
- Education: Turkish Military Academy
- Occupation: Politician
- Profession: Officer

Mustafa Ok (1925 – 5 January 2009) was a Turkish military officer, politician and former government minister.

== Life ==
Mustafa Ok was born at Koldere village of Saruhanlı ilçe (district) in Manisa Province in 1925. After primary and secondary education in Turgutlu, he graduated from the Turkish Military Academy in 1944. In 1955–1956, he served in the Turkish Brigade in South Korea. In 1962, he resigned from the army, and entered politics. After 1977, he left politics. He died on 5 January 2009 in İzmir .

Mustafa Ok was married and father of three.

== Political life ==
Before resignation from the army, Mustafa Ok wrote an article as a non-journalist writer in Cumhuriyet newspaper within the scope of an article contest. The subject of the contest was "The most important issue of Turkey". His article was titled "The foundation of Villages". He received the first prize in the contest and attracted public attention. After resignation, Mustafa Ok joined the Republican People's Party (CHP) and was elected a deputy of Manisa Province in 1965 for the 13th Parliament of Turkey. He kept his seat in the 14th and 15th Parliament of Turkey up to 5 June 1977. In the 37th government of Turkey, he was appointed Minister of Village Affairs and Cooperatives serving between 26 January 1974 and 17 November 1974.
