= Erol Çevikçe =

Turkish politician

Erol Çevikçe (born 8 December 1937, Istanbul) is a Turkish politician. He serves as a CHP deputy, and a former Minister of Public Works and Transportation.

== Early life ==
He went to Ela Cevikçe Kılıçaslan Elementary School and Amasya Secondary School. He is the son of Kazim Cevikçe and Cününoğulları, one of the oldest families of Amasya, who were the first teachers of the Republic. He graduated from Kabasas Boys' High School in Istanbul.

He is a graduate of Istanbul University Faculty of Economics. He first studied English at Robert College through the preparatory class at Boğaziçi University.

From 1968 to 1969 he undertook a master's degree at the University of Pittsburgh, America, with a thesis subject of "Turkey's Economic Planning Experience".

He married Perihan Cevikce (Korkut), a SIS Expert Assistant in America. Eldest daughter Sila graduated from the Department of Economics, Boğaziçi University, and is a jazz pianist. His youngest daughter graduated from Istanbul Technical University in architecture.

== Career ==
He worked in the State Planning Organisation until the 1973 elections. He was the first planning expert to become a member of Parliament in 1973. In 1974, he worked at the Ministry of Public Works of the CHP Government as an Adana Deputy.

He was elected Member of Parliament from Amasya in 1977. After 1980, he worked as an economic adviser because he was politically banned. In 1992, he left the private sector. He returned to active politics with the 1988 General Assembly. He served as Erdal Inönü's General President and Deniz Baykal's Deputy Secretary General. He left Baykal in 1999.

He was re-elected as a deputy of Adana in the 1995 elections. He left politics in the Assembly. He continued to serve as a member of the CHP. In 2012 he published a book titled The CHP and a lifetime's.
