= Turkish Republican Party =

Turkish Republican Party may refer to:

- Republican Party (Turkey), a former political party in Turkey
- Republican Turkish Party, a current-day political party in Cyprus

== See also ==
- Republican People's Party
