= Süleyman Ârif Emre =

Turkish politician and poet (1923 – 2019)

National Salvation Party General Chairman
- In office October 11, 1972 – October 20, 1973
- Preceded by: Position established
- Succeeded by: Necmettin Erbakan

Grand National Assembly of Turkey; 13th, 15th, 16th, 20th, and 21st Term Deputy
- Constituency: 1965 – Adıyaman; 1973 – Istanbul; 1977 – Istanbul; 1995 – Istanbul; 1999 – Istanbul

Personal details
- Born: July 1, 1923 Besni, Adıyaman, Turkey
- Died: July 21, 2019 (aged 96) Istanbul, Turkey
- Party: Liberty Party (1955–1958); New Turkey Party (1961–1972); National Order Party(1970–1971); National Salvation Party (1972–1980); Welfare Party (1983–1998); Virtue Party (1998–2001); Felicity Party (2001–2004)
- Children: 4
- Occupation: Politician; lawyer; poet

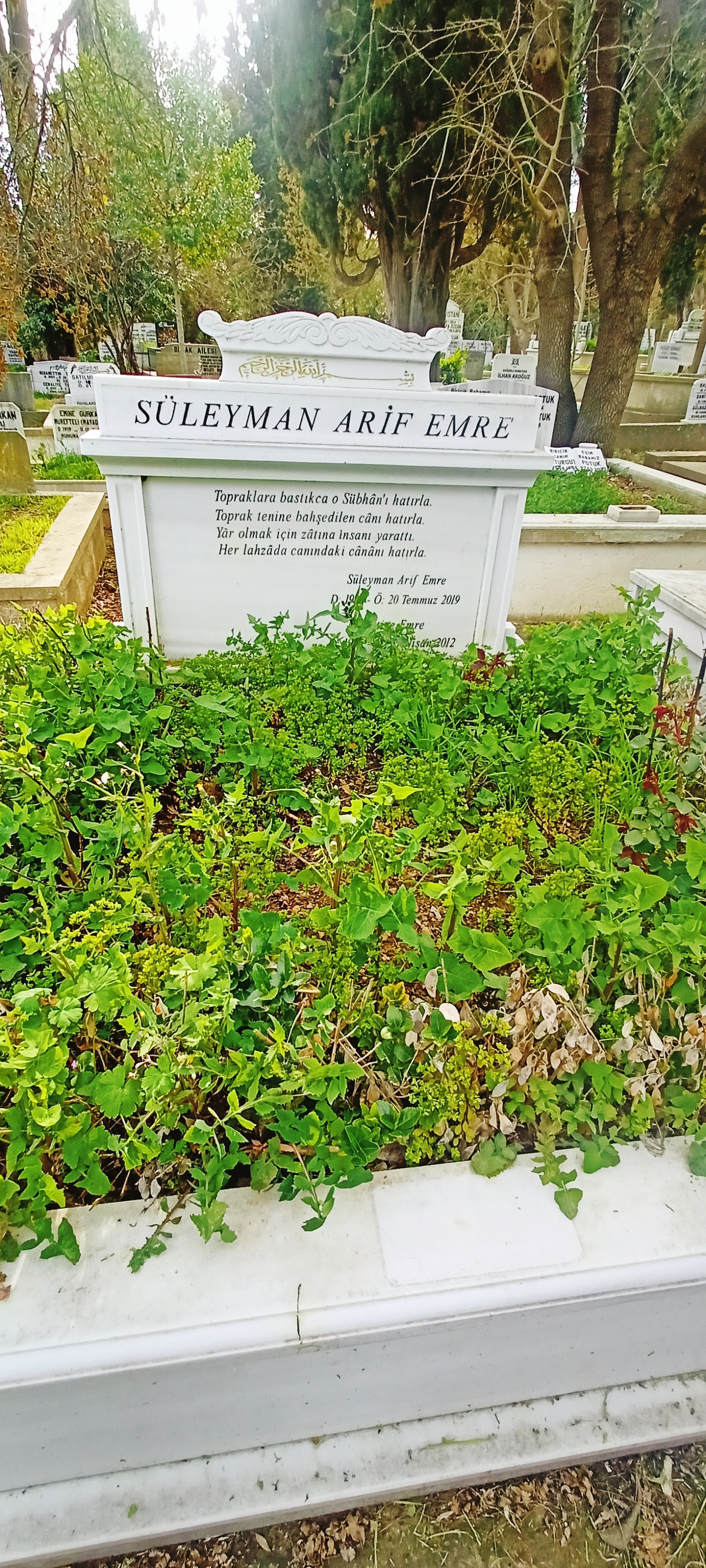
Tomb of Süleyman Arif Emre

Süleyman Ârif Emre (July 1, 1923, Adıyaman – July 21, 2019 Istanbul), was a Turkish politician and poet.

== Biography ==
He completed his high school education at Ankara Gazi High School. He graduated from the Ankara University Faculty of Law in 1944. He worked as a freelance lawyer, Ankara Tax Office, Presidency of Religious Affairs, and served as a deputy for Adıyaman in the 13th term and Istanbul in the 15th, 16th, 20th, and 21st terms, as well as state minister. He was the founding chairman of the National Salvation Party, and a founding member of the National Order Party. He was married and a father of four.

Süleyman Ârif Emre, who witnessed the last fifty years of Turkish political life, started his political career in the Liberty Party in 1956 and continued in the New Turkey Party in 1961; he mainly contributed to laying the foundations of the National Vision Movement. After the coup of September 12, 1980, he was arrested and tried by the Mamak Martial Law Court but was acquitted. He prepared the program for the National Order Party led by Erbakan, founded and chaired the National Salvation Party after the former was closed, and later served in the management of the Welfare Party, Virtue Party, and Felicity Party, serving as a deputy for five terms. He documented his memories in the book Thirty-Five Years in Politics and collected all his poems in the book The Song of Waters. Another book of his is The Vital Features of Prayer.

His daily writings were published in the Millî Gazete.

Turkish politician Süleyman Ârif Emre died on July 21, 2019, in Istanbul at the age of 96.

== Works ==
…unfortunately, for some reason; my esteemed friend became a lawyer, a politician, but left his poetry to the last. Whereas he was first and foremost a good poet. He had that talent.

— Bekir Sıtkı Erdoğan, from the “Friendly” introduction written for Love’s Love
- Love's Love, Hikmet Publications, 2005
- The Song of Waters, Akabe Publications, Konya, ISBN 978-975-65-6206-2
- The Vital Features of Prayer, 2012, Konya, ISBN 978-975-60-2130-9
- Thirty-Five Years in Politics, 3 volumes, 2015,
- Administrative Judiciary Practical Workbook, 2013, ISBN 978-975-02-2348-8

== Awards ==
- 2017 Necmettin Erbakan Awards, Honorary Award
