= Speaker of the Grand National Assembly =

Presiding officer of the legislature of Turkey

Speaker of the Grand National Assembly of Turkey
- Türkiye Büyük Millet Meclisi Başkanı
- Seal of the Grand National Assembly

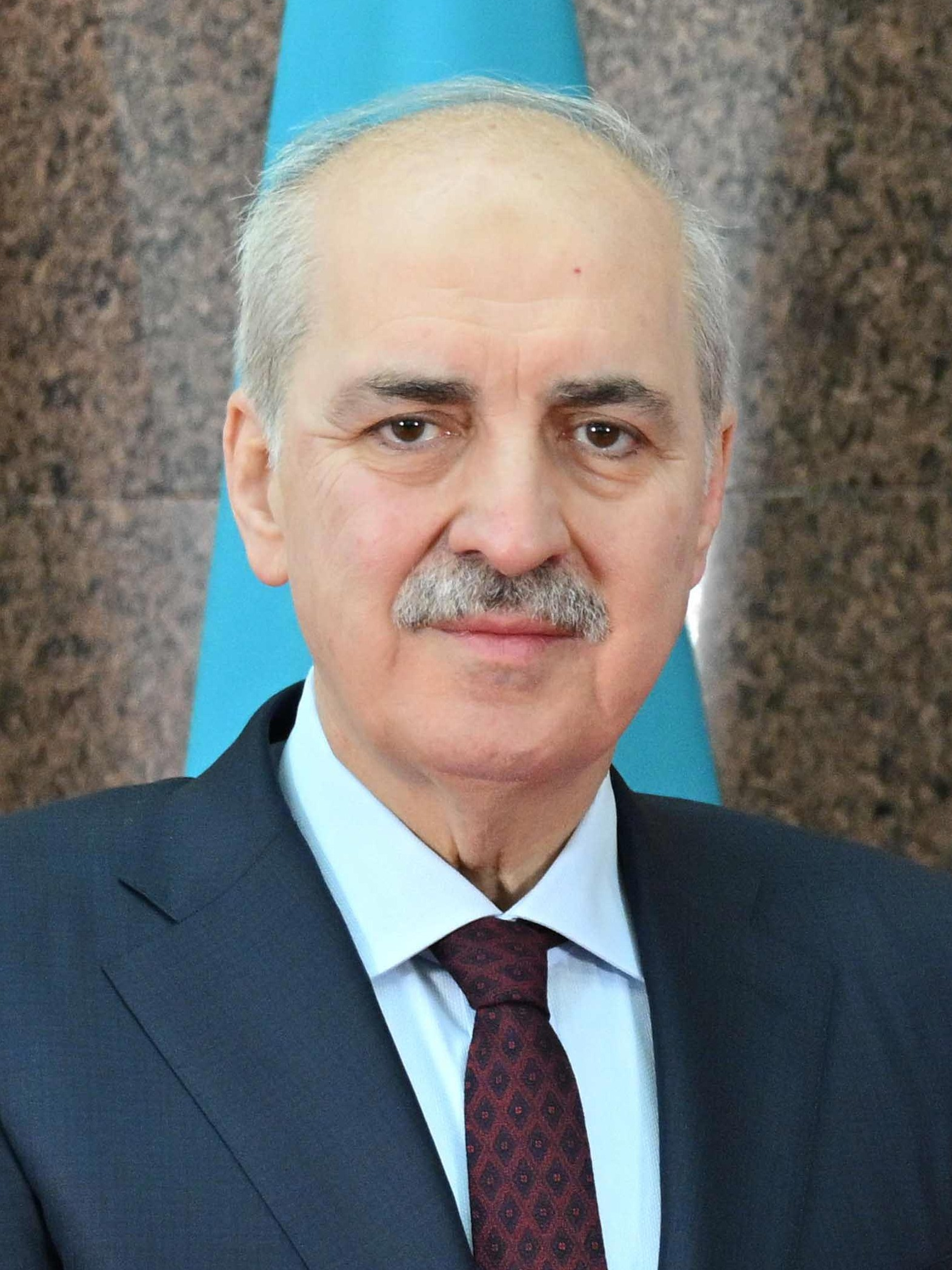
- Incumbent; Numan Kurtulmuş since 7 June 2023
- Grand National Assembly of Turkey
- Style: The Right Honourable
- Appointer: Grand National Assembly of Turkey
- Term length: Three years, renewable
- Inaugural holder: Mustafa Kemal Atatürk
- Formation: 23 April 1920; 106 years ago
- Deputy: Deputy Speakers
- Website: www.tbmm.gov.tr

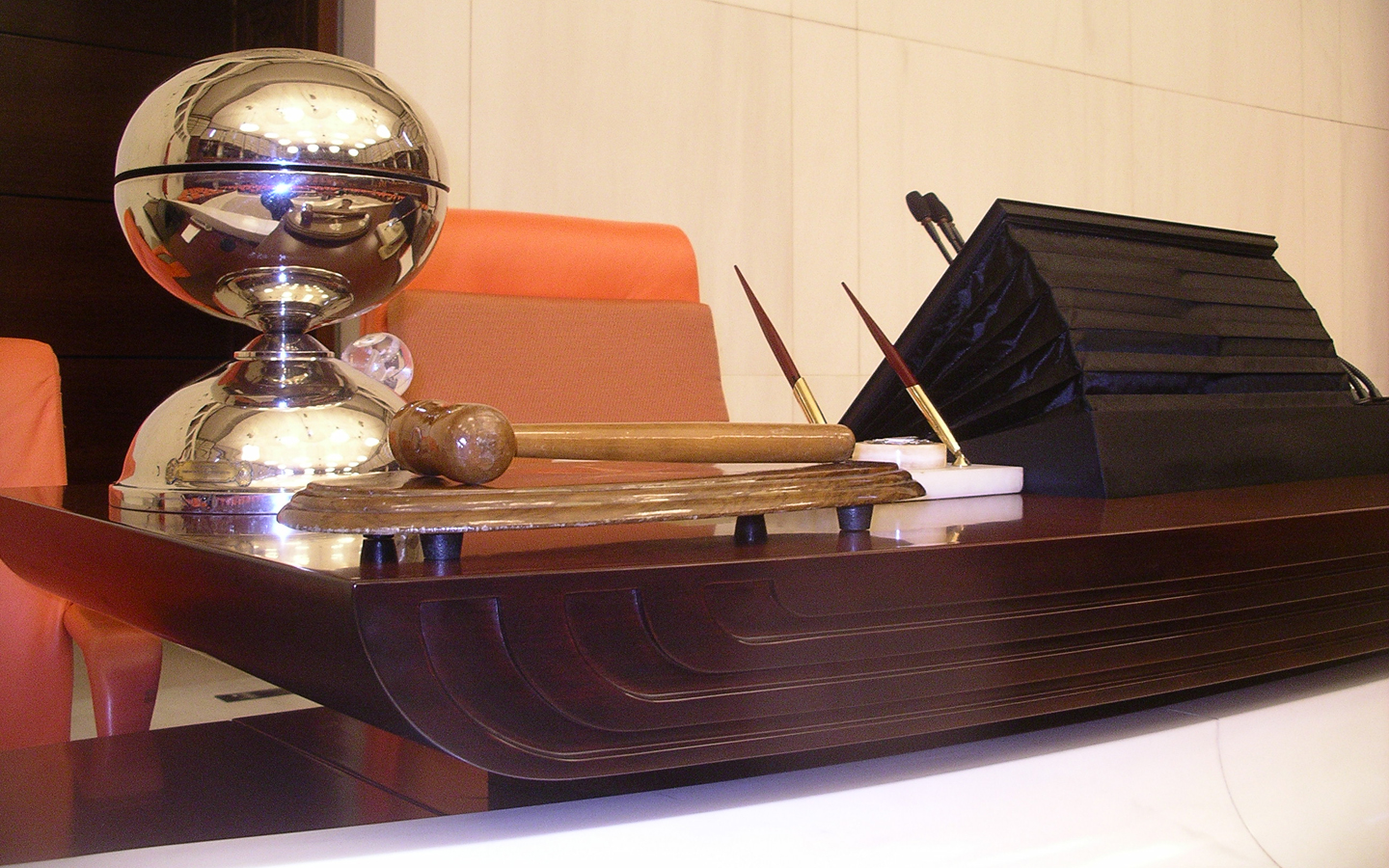
The speaker's chair in parliament

This article lists the speakers of the Grand National Assembly of Turkey. The name of the parliament of Turkey, originally and currently the Grand National Assembly of Turkey (Turkish: Türkiye Büyük Millet Meclisi) since its establishment on 23 April 1920, has for short periods been changed.

A Senate also existed besides the National Assembly between 1960 and 1980.

== List of speakers ==
No.	Portrait	Name (Birth–Death)	Term of office			Political party
No.	Portrait	Name (Birth–Death)	Took office	Left office	Time in office	Political party
Grand National Assembly
1		Mustafa Kemal Atatürk (1881–1938)	24 April 1920	29 October 1923	3 years, 188 days	Independent
2		Fethi Okyar (1880–1943)	1 November 1923	22 November 1924	1 year, 21 days	Republican People's Party
3		Kâzım Özalp (1882–1968)	26 November 1924	1 March 1935	10 years, 95 days	Republican People's Party
4		Abdülhalik Renda (1881–1957)	1 March 1935	5 August 1946	11 years, 157 days	Republican People's Party
5		Kâzım Karabekir (1882–1948)	5 August 1946	26 January 1948	1 year, 174 days	Republican People's Party
6		Ali Fuat Cebesoy (1882–1968)	30 January 1948	1 November 1948	276 days	Republican People's Party
7		Şükrü Saracoğlu (1887–1953)	1 November 1948	22 May 1950	1 year, 202 days	Republican People's Party
8		Refik Koraltan (1889–1974)	22 May 1950	27 May 1960	10 years, 5 days	Democrat Party
Constituent Assembly
–		Kâzım Orbay (1886–1964)	9 January 1961	26 October 1961	290 days	Independent
National Assembly
9		Fuat Sirmen (1899–1981)	1 November 1961	10 October 1965	3 years, 343 days	Republican People's Party
10		Ferruh Bozbeyli (1927–2019)	22 October 1965	1 November 1970	5 years, 10 days	Justice Party
11		Sabit Osman Avcı (1921–2009)	26 November 1970	14 October 1973	2 years, 322 days	Justice Party
12		Kemal Güven (1921–2013)	18 December 1973	5 June 1977	3 years, 169 days	Republican People's Party
13		Cahit Karakaş (1928–2025)	17 November 1977	12 September 1980	2 years, 300 days	Republican People's Party
Consultative Assembly
–		Sadi Irmak (1904–1990)	27 October 1981	4 December 1983	2 years, 38 days	Independent
Grand National Assembly
14		Necmettin Karaduman (1927–2017)	4 December 1983	29 November 1987	3 years, 360 days	Motherland Party
15		Yıldırım Akbulut (1935–2021)	24 December 1987	9 November 1989	1 year, 320 days	Motherland Party
16		Kaya Erdem (born 1928)	21 November 1989	20 October 1991	1 year, 333 days	Motherland Party
17		Hüsamettin Cindoruk (1933–2026)	16 November 1991	1 October 1995	3 years, 319 days	True Path Party
18		İsmet Sezgin (1928–2016)	18 October 1995	24 December 1995	67 days	True Path Party
19		Mustafa Kalemli (born 1943)	25 January 1996	30 September 1997	1 year, 248 days	Motherland Party
20		Hikmet Çetin (born 1937)	16 October 1997	18 April 1999	1 year, 184 days	Republican People's Party
(15)		Yıldırım Akbulut (1935–2021)	20 May 1999	30 September 2000	1 year, 133 days	Motherland Party
21		Ömer İzgi (born 1940)	18 October 2000	3 November 2002	2 years, 16 days	Nationalist Movement Party
22		Bülent Arınç (born 1948)	19 November 2002	9 August 2007	4 years, 263 days	Justice and Development Party
23		Köksal Toptan (born 1943)	9 August 2007	9 August 2009	2 years	Justice and Development Party
24		Mehmet Ali Şahin (born 1950)	9 August 2009	4 July 2011	1 year, 329 days	Justice and Development Party
25		Cemil Çiçek (born 1946)	4 July 2011	7 June 2015	3 years, 338 days	Justice and Development Party
26		İsmet Yılmaz (born 1961)	1 July 2015	1 November 2015	123 days	Justice and Development Party
27		İsmail Kahraman (born 1940)	22 November 2015	9 July 2018	2 years, 229 days	Justice and Development Party
28		Binali Yıldırım (born 1955)	12 July 2018	18 February 2019	221 days	Justice and Development Party
29		Mustafa Şentop (born 1968)	24 February 2019	2 June 2023	4 years, 98 days	Justice and Development Party
30		Numan Kurtulmuş (born 1959)	7 June 2023	Incumbent	3 years, 107 days	Justice and Development Party

== Timeline ==
=== Temporary speakers ===
When a new session of the Grand National Assembly meets, the oldest parliament member temporarily acts as the speaker until a new speaker is elected.

Session	Portrait	Name	Political party
1st		Mehmet Şerif Avcıoğlu	Independent
2nd		Abdurrahman Şeref	Republican People's Party
3rd		Hasan Saka	Republican People's Party
4th		Abdülhak Hâmid Tarhan	Republican People's Party
5th		Necip Asım Yazıksız	Republican People's Party
6th		Besim Ömer Akalın	Republican People's Party
7th		Suphi Artel	Republican People's Party
8th		Ali Münif Yeğenağa	Republican People's Party
9th		Hüseyin Cahit Yalçın	Republican People's Party
10th & 11th		Ali Fuat Cebesoy	Democrat Party
12th		Yakup Kadri Karaosmanoğlu	Republican People's Party
13th		Orhan Seyfi Orhon	Justice Party
14th		İsmet İnönü	Republican People's Party
15th & 16th		Kinyas Kartal	Justice Party
17th		Fahrettin Özdilek	Populist Party
18th		Kamil Tuğrul Coşkunoğlu	Motherland Party
19th		Ali Rıza Septioğlu	True Path Party
20th		Süleyman Arif Emre	Welfare Party
21st		Ali Rıza Septioğlu	True Path Party
22nd & 23rd		Şükrü Elekdağ	Republican People's Party
24th		Oktay Ekşi	Republican People's Party
25th & 26th		Deniz Baykal	Republican People's Party
27th		Durmuş Yılmaz	Good Party
27th		Celal Adan	Nationalist Movement Party
28th		Devlet Bahçeli	Nationalist Movement Party

== See also ==
- Senate of the Republic
- List of chairmen of the Senate of Turkey
