= Advisory Parliament of Turkey =

The Advisory Parliament existed from 15 October 1981 to 6 November 1983. It was established by the military rule of 1980 Turkish coup d'état. 120 MPs were representatives of the provinces and 40 MPs were appointed by the military rule.

== Main parliamentary milestones ==
Some of the important events in the history of the parliament are the following:

=== Background: Between the 16th term and the Advisory Parliament ===
- 13 September 1980 – Following the coup, Kenan Evren became the head of the state (president). Military rule (MGK) replaced the parliament
- 21 September – Bülent Ulusu formed the 44th government of Turkey
- 27 October 1980 – Provisional constitution
- 30 June 1981 – Military rule (MGK) which exercised legislation passed law about the advisory parliament
- 15 October 1981 – The names of the Advisory parliament MPs were announced
- 16 October 1981 – All former political parties were closed by the military rule

=== During the Advisory Parliament ===
- 23 October 1981 – Sadi Irmak, a former prime minister was elected as the speaker of the parliament in the first session of the parliament
- 7 November 1982 – Referendum on the new constitution (accepted)
- 8 November 1982 – According to new constitution Kenan Evren became the 7th president of Turkey
- 8 April 1983 – New election law
- 15 May 1983 – Nationalist Democracy Party (MDP) was founded by Turgut Sunalp
- 21 May 1983 – Three new parties; Motherland Party (ANAP by Turgut Özal, Great Turkey Party by Fethi Esener and Populist Party by Necdet Calp were founded
- 26 May 1983 – Social Democracy Party (SODEP) was founded by Erdal İnönü
- 6 November 1983 – General election

Preceded by 16th Parliament of Turkey	Advisory Parliament of Turkey; Sadi Irmak; 15 October 1981 – 6 December 1983	Succeeded by 17th Parliament of Turkey
