= Ömer İzgi =

21st Speaker of the Parliament of Turkey

21st Speaker of the Grand National Assembly
- In office 18 October 2000 – 3 November 2002
- Prime Minister: Süleyman Demirel; Ahmet Necdet Sezer
- Preceded by: Yıldırım Akbulut
- Succeeded by: Bülent Arınç

Member of the Grand National Assembly
- In office 18 April 1999 – 3 November 2002
- Constituency: Konya (1999)

Personal details
- Born: 1 January 1940 (age 86) Doğanhisar, Konya, Turkey
- Party: Nationalist Movement Party
- Education: Ankara University, Law School

Ömer İzgi (born 1 January 1940) is a former Turkish politician and lawyer who served as the Speaker of the Grand National Assembly of Turkey from 2000 to 2002. He was a Member of Parliament for the electoral district of Konya between 1999 and 2002 from the Nationalist Movement Party (MHP), but lost his seat in the 2002 general election.

== Early life and career ==
Ömer İzgi was born on 1 January 1940 in Doğanhisar, Konya and graduated from Ankara University Faculty of Law and also obtained a master's degree in Civil Law in the same faculty. He worked as the chief expert at the Prime Ministry of Turkey before becoming a freelance lawyer.

== Political career ==
=== Turkish nationalism ===
In 1983, İzgi became one of the founding members of the Conservative Party (Turkish: Muhafazakâr Parti, MP). On 30 November 1985, the MP renamed itself and became the Nationalist Labour Party (Turkish: Milliyetçi Çalışma Partisi, MÇP). İzgi subsequently became the Deputy Secretary General of the new party. On 24 January 1993, the MÇP renamed itself for a second time and became the Nationalist Movement Party (Turkish: Milliyetçi Hareket Partisi, MHP). İzgi served as the head of the MHP's Ankara Provincial Branch and also served as Deputy Leader of the party.

=== Speaker of Parliament ===
İzgi was elected to Parliament as an MP for Konya in the 1999 general election and subsequently became the MHP's parliamentary group leader. He was the MHP's candidate to succeed former Prime Minister Yıldırım Akbulut as the Speaker of the Grand National Assembly in 2000 and served as Speaker until the 21st Parliament of Turkey came to an end with the November 2002 general election. Along with all other MHP MPs, İzgi lost his seat as his party fell below the 10% election threshold required to win seats in Parliament.

== See also ==
- Devlet Bahçeli
- Turkish nationalism
