= 37th government of Turkey =

1974 coalition government

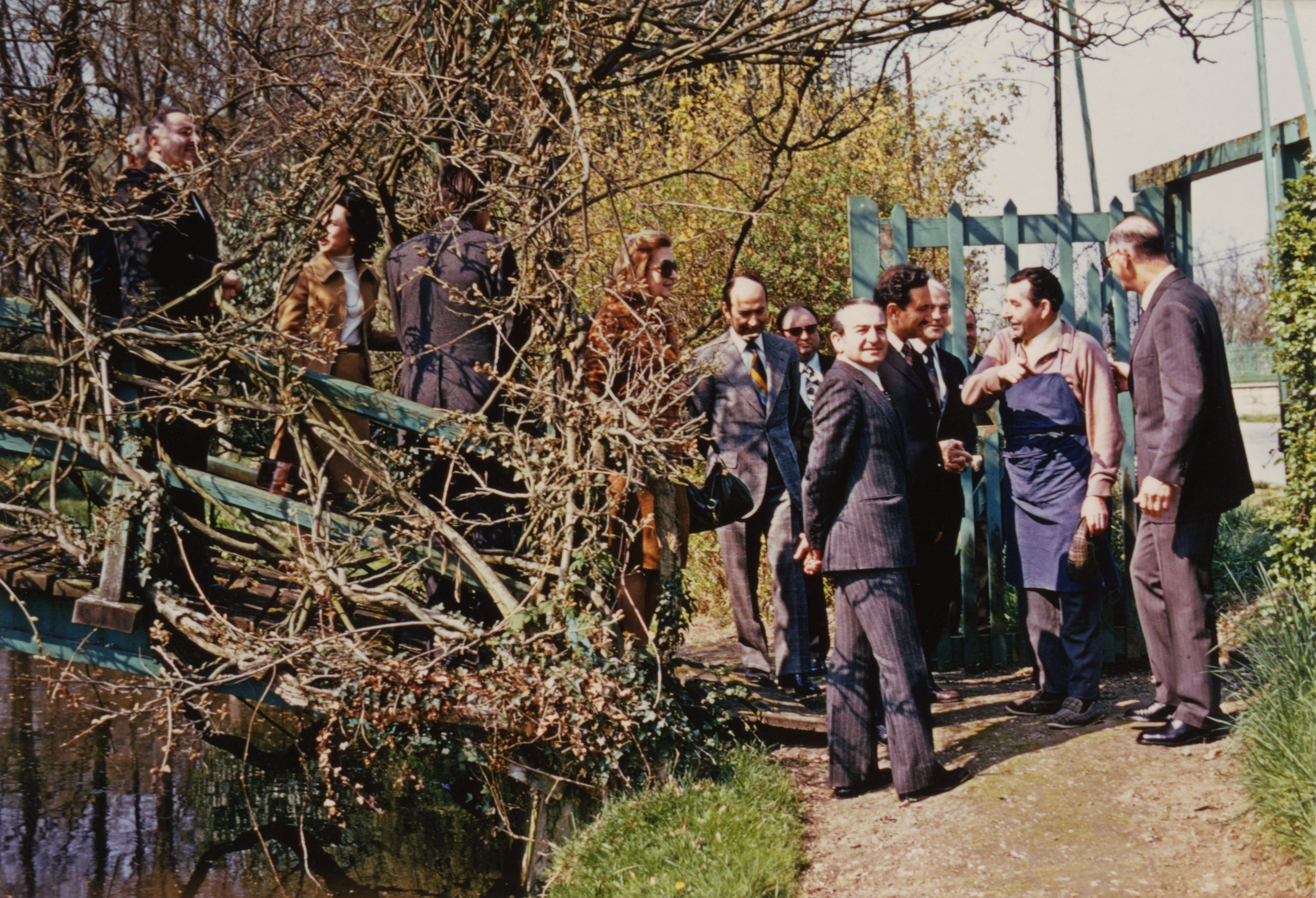
Bülent Ecevit, Necmettin Erbakan and Hasan Esat Işık in Giverny, April 1974

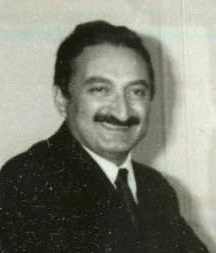
Bülent Ecevit

The 37th government of Turkey (26 January 1974 – 17 November 1974) was a coalition government of the Republican People's Party (CHP) and the National Salvation Party (MSP) in 1974. The prime minister was Bülent Ecevit of the CHP, and the deputy prime minister was Necmettin Erbakan of the MSP.

== The elections ==
In the elections held on 14 October 1973, the CHP gained 185 seats and MSP gained 48 seats out of a total of 450. The CHP was a social-democratic party and the MSP was an Islamist party. But despite the vast difference in ideology, the two parties formed a coalition.

== The government ==
Title	Name	Party
Prime Minister	Bülent Ecevit	CHP
Deputy Prime Minister	Necmettin Erbakan	MSP
Minister of State
Minister of State	Orhan Eyüboğlu	CHP
Minister of State	İsmail Hakkı Birler	CHP
Minister of State	Süleyman Arif Emre	MSP
Ministry of Justice	Şevket Kazan	MSP
Ministry of National Defense	Hasan Esat Işık	CHP
Ministry of the Interior	Oğuzhan Asiltürk	MSP
Ministry of Foreign Affairs	Turan Güneş	CHP
Ministry of Finance	Deniz Baykal	CHP
Ministry of National Education	Mustafa Üstündağ	CHP
Ministry of Public Works	Erol Çevikçe	CHP
Ministry of Commerce	Fehim Adak	MSP
Ministry of Health and Social Security	Selahattin Cizrelioğlu	CHP
Ministry of Customs and Monopolies	Mahmut Türkmenoğlu	CHP
Ministry Agriculture	Korkut Özal	MSP
Ministry of Transport	Ferda Güley	CHP
Ministry of Labour	Önder Sav	CHP
Ministry of Social Security	Hayrettin Uysal	CHP
Ministry of Industry	Abdülkerim Doğru	MSP
Ministry of Culture and Tourism	Orhan Birgit	CHP
Ministry of Construction and Settlement	Ali Topuz	CHP
Ministry of Energy and Natural Resources	Cahit Kayra	CHP
Ministry of Village Affairs and Cooperatives	Mustafa Ok	CHP
Ministry of Forestry	Ahmet Şener	CHP
Ministry of Youth and Sports	Muslihittin Yılmaz Mete	CHP

== Events ==
In March 1974, the coalitions foundation was strained in the Güzel İstanbul Affair. The MSP side wanted to remove a nude sculpture that had been erected in Istanbul in celebration of the 50th anniversary of the republic however such a removal was not in line with the democratic views of the CHP. The CHP ended up going along with the wishes that the sculpture be removed in order to keep the MSP in coalition with them.

In July 1974, Turkish forces invaded Cyprus following the coup orchestrated by the Greek Junta that expelled the President of Cyprus.

== Dissolution ==
On September 3, 1974, Ecevit announced that the political perspectives of CHP and MSP could not be reconciled. On September 18, he resigned.

Preceded by 36th government of Turkey (Naim Talu)	37th Government of Turkey; 26 January 1974-17 November 1974	Succeeded by 38th government of Turkey (Sadi Irmak)
