= Peace Party (Turkey) =

Peace Party Barış Partisi
- Leader: Ali Haydar Veziroğlu
- Founded: December 10, 1996
- Dissolved: May 9, 1999
- Split from: Republican People's Party
- Preceded by: Unity Party
- Headquarters: Turkey
- Ideology: Alevism-Red Shi'ism; Spiritual leftism
- Political position: Center-left
- International affiliation: International League of Religious Socialists; Unrepresented Nations and Peoples Organization

The Peace Party (Barış Partisi, BP) was an Alevi Turkish political party founded in 1996 in Turkey by former Republican People's Party (CHP) MP Ali Haydar Veziroğlu and existed until its closure in 1999 after the Turkish general election of 1999.

It had its roots among the Alevi-Shi'i population in Turkey. It failed to gain any seats in the Turkish Parliament under the party leadership of Ali Haydar Veziroğlu. Its predecessor was the Unity Party (Türkiye Birlik Partisi, TBP) between 1966 and 1981.
