= Cahit Karakaş =

Turkish engineer and politician (1928–2025)

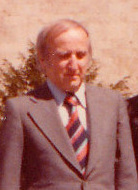
- Karakaş in 1978

Minister of Public Works
- In office 26 March 1971 – 10 November 1971
- Prime Minister: Nihat Erim
- Preceded by: Yaşar Gülez
- Succeeded by: Mukadder Öztekin

Minister of Transportation
- In office 10 November 1971 – 11 December 1971
- Prime Minister: Nihat Erim
- Preceded by: Selahattin Babüroğlu
- Succeeded by: Rıfkı Danışman

Speaker of the National Assembly
- In office 17 November 1977 – 12 September 1980
- President: Fahri Korutürk
- Preceded by: Kemal Güven
- Succeeded by: Sadi Irmak (1981)

Personal details
- Born: 1928 Bartın, Turkey
- Died: 7 September 2025 (aged 97) Ankara, Turkey
- Party: Justice Party (AP); Republican People's Party (CHP); Populist Party (HP); Democratic Left Party (DSP)
- Education: Istanbul Technical University; Technische Universität Berlin

Cahit Karakaş (1928 – 7 September 2025) was a Turkish engineer and politician. He served as government minister and Speaker of the Parliament.

== Background ==
Karakaş was born in Bartın in 1928. In 1952, he graduated from Istanbul Technical University. After his doctorate at Technische Universität Berlin, he returned to Turkey to serve as a civil engineer. Karakaş died on 7 September 2025, at the age of 97 in Ankara.

== Politician career ==
Karakaş joined the Justice Party and in 1965 he was elected MP from Zonguldak Province. He was re-elected in 1969. In 1973, he supported the technocratic government of Nihat Erim and he became the Minister of Public Works in the 33rd government of Turkey serving between 26 March 1971 and 10 November 1971, and then the Minister of Transportation from 10 November to 11 December 1971. He later joined the Republican People's Party (CHP) and re-elected as a CHP member in 1973.

After the 1977 general elections, in which CHP won the plurality, the parliament failed to elect its speaker for about six months. Finally on 17 November that year, Cahit Karakaş was elected the Speaker of the Turkish parliament. He kept this post until the 1980 Turkish coup d'etat staged on 12 September.

During the civilian regime following 1983, he joined the Populist Party (HP). After the foundation of the Democratic Left Party (DSP), he joined DSP. His membership in the parliament ended in the 1987 general elections, due to DSP's failure to pass %10 electoral threshold.

Political offices
Preceded by Turgut Yaşar Gülez	Minister of Public Works; 26 March 1971 – 10 November 1971	Succeeded by Mukadder Öztekiner
Preceded by Selahattin Babüroğlu	Minister of Transportation; 10 November 1971 – 11 December 1971	Succeeded by Rıfkı Danışman
Preceded by Kemal Güven	Speaker of the Parliament of Turkey; 17 November 1977 – 12 September 1980	Succeeded by Sadi Irmak; Consultative Assembly
