= Orhan Birgit =

Turkish lawyer, politician and journalist (1927–2019)

Minister of Tourism
- In office January 1974 – November 1974
- Prime Minister: Bülent Ecevit

Personal details
- Born: 13 July 1927 Kars, Turkey
- Died: 15 October 2019 (aged 92) Istanbul, Turkey
- Resting place: Edirnekapı Sakızağacı cemetery, Istsnabul
- Party: Republican People's Party (1946–12 September 1980)
- Other political affiliations: Democratic Left Party
- Children: 1
- Education: Istanbul University

Orhan Birgit (13 July 1927 – 15 October 2019) was a Turkish lawyer, politician and journalist. He was a member of the Republican People's Party (CHP) and served as the minister of tourism in the first cabinet of Bülent Ecevit in 1974. He was one of the deputies of the party. He contributed to the leading newspapers, including Ulus and Cumhuriyet.

== Early life and education ==
Birgit was born in Kars on 13 July 1927. His father was a civil servant. He received a degree in law from Istanbul University.

== Career and activities ==
Following his graduation Birgit worked as a lawyer and a journalist. His first journalist work was for a local newspaper entitled Akın based in Mersin. In 1946 he joined the CHP. He was one of the contributors of Ulus, Memleket and Yeni Sabah. Birgit was a member of executive board of the Association of Turkish Cyprus (Turkish: Kıbrıs Türktür Cemiyeti (KTC)) which had been established in August 1954 to support the rights of the Turkish minority in Cyprus against the United Nations and other organisations. He was arrested during the Istanbul pogrom on 7 September 1955 due to his KTC membership and was acquitted on all counts. In 1958 he established a weekly news magazine, Kim, with Şahap Balcıoğlu, Ali İhsan Göğüş and Özcan Ergüder.

In the 1965 general election Birgit became a deputy for the CHP. Next year Bülent Ecevit was elected as the CHP secretary general, and Birgit was elected as a member of the central committee of the party in the congress. Güneş was part of the left of center group in the central committee.

In the first cabinet of Prime Minister Bülent Ecevit Birgit was named as the minister of tourism and the speaker of the cabinet serving in the post between January and November 1974. Following the military coup in 1980 Birgit worked as a journalist for Dünya and Hürriyet. In 1991 he was again elected to the Parliament from Istanbul for the Democratic Left Party led by Bülent Ecevit. He also taught at faculty of communications of several universities, including Galatasaray University, Istanbul University and Anadolu University.

Then Birgit joined the Cumhuriyet newspaper. He was author of the following books: Herşey çok güzel olacak (Turkish: Everything will be great), Kalbur saman içinde (Turkish: Griddle in straw) and Evvel zaman içinde (Turkish: Once upon a time). Birgit also directed a documentary entitled Ermenek – Çamlıbel kültür çadırları (Turkish: Ermenek – Çamlıbel culture tents) with Behlül Dal.

== Personal life and death ==
Birgit was married and had a daughter. He died in Istanbul on 15 October 2019. He was buried in Edirnekapı Sakızağacı cemetery in Istanbul on 17 October.
