= Nine Lights Doctrine =

Political ideology

The Nine Lights Doctrine (Turkish: Dokuz Işık Doktrini) refers to an ideology introduced by Alparslan Turkeş, the founder of the Nationalist Movement Party (MHP) of Turkey.

== Precepts ==
Each of the lights is presented as a precept "good-for-everybody". The nine lights are as follows:

- Patriotism: (also known as Nationalism) Everything is for the Turkish nation, together with the Turkish nation and according to the Turkish nation, which can be summed up in words, is loyalty to the Turkish nation, love and loyalty and service to the Turkish state.
- Idealism: To adopt Turkishness, pride and consciousness in line with Islamic morals and virtues.
- Morality: The principles of preserving and developing the high existence of the Turkish nation in accordance with its spirit, customs and traditions are called the principles of morality.
- Social mindedness: It is the view that all kinds of activities should be carried out for the benefit of society. It covers two separate sections as social and economic. It accepts property as an economic view, but indicates an opinion that opposes the abuse of property to the detriment of the nation. It envisages a mixed economy and state control of the main strategic economic activities. It accepts the establishment of social justice order, equal opportunity, social security and social assistance organization as a social view.
- Scientific mentality: It is the principle of examining the events and existence with the thought of science by removing prejudices and afterthoughts and making the scientific leader in all kinds of activities to be undertaken.
- Freedom: Personality is related to the personal development of the individual. Personal development reveals the personality of an individual by blending it with the environment and culture in which the individual is located. Liberty means independence and freedom. Independence and freedom are important for the peaceful existence of countries and people.
- Peasant care: It envisages development by combining villages into agricultural cities. It aims to become cooperative in order to save the peasant from the usurers and to provide the loan and other aid they need. In particular, it aims to bring prosperity to the villagers living in the forest region first and foremost. And it foresees investment in the villagers.
- Populism: People and civilisations always develop by wanting and seeking better, more beautiful, more perfect. It is the consciousness of not being content with what one has and always wanting more and making an effort to achieve it. However, in these efforts and efforts, the aim is to rise and progress without breaking away from the history, national identity and roots of the Turkish nation. We accept being with the people towards the people in every work to be done, as an indispensable principle of progress and promotion.
- Industrialisation: For the development of the Turkish nation, it is necessary to industrialize quickly and prepare for the nuclear and space era.

== History ==
The Nine Lights Doctrine was first published in 1965 as a political pamphlet, but by 1978 it evolved into an ideology presented in a book of 672 pages. The nine light doctrine was included into the party program of the Republican Peasants' Nationalist Party in 1967, which later changed its name and evolved into the Nationalist Movement Party (MHP) in 1969. Fikret Eren further elaborated on the Nine Lights Doctrine and explained that the national societalist ideology was different than both socialism and capitalism which he claimed would exploit the majority of the population. He demanded the creation of ten percent farmer villages in Turkey which then would produce for the local population. The membership in workers unions would have to be mandatory, but not under the control of the state.
