= Mustafa Timisi =

Turkish politician (born 1936)

Member of the Grand National Assembly of Turkey

Assembly Member for Sivas
- In office 1969–1973
- In office 1973–1977

President of the Unity Party
- In office 1969–1980

Personal details
- Born: 1 May 1936 (age 89) Divriği, Sivas
- Party: Unity Party (1966-1980)
- Other political affiliations: Social Democracy Party (SODEP) (1983-1985); Social Democratic People's Party (SDHP) (2002-2010)

Mustafa Timisi (born 1 May 1936) is a Turkish politician, a leader of the Unity Party.

== Early life and political activism ==
Mustafa Timisi’s political career began probably with his opposition towards the inclusion of the Alevis in the so-called Circle of Islam by the Government of Prime Minister Ismet Inönü. Timisi and other students of Alevi origin at the Ankara University organized themselves in 1963. They directed themselves to the press and Timisi read out a statement declaring that the Alevis supported Mustafa Kemal Atatürk and the National Struggle. The statement was viewed as a positive step by the Turkish president Cemal Gürsel, who invited members of the Alevi university students of which several later became active politicians to a meeting with him. But the Republican People's Party (CHP) approach to the Alevis was ambiguous and during the government of Süleyman Demirel, İbrahim Elmalı, the president of the Directorate of Religious Affairs at the time stated, “There is no such thing as Alevis,” which caused a strong opposition from the Alevis towards the Turkish Government.

== Political career ==
In 1966, the Unity Party was established by left-leaning Alevi politicians. During a general assembly held after the elections of 1969, Timisi was appointed as president of the party as the successor of Huseyin Balan. After the military coup of 12 March 1971, Timisi secured a seat in parliament for the Unity Party. During his tenure as a deputy of Turkish Grand National Assembly he was opposed to the hanging of Deniz Gezmiş and his accomplices and also directed a letter to Cevdet Sunay, the president at the time, demanding their amnesty. Timisi and the Unity Party continued to be active in politics until the military coup in 1980 during which the party was banned and he was shortly imprisoned in Istanbul together with Behice Boran. Following the coup, he was involved in several political parties such as the Social Democracy Party (SODEP) or the Social Democratic Populist Party (SHP) which later merged into the new CHP.

== İş Bank ==
In 1995, Timisi resigned from an active political career and began working for İş Bank as a member of the board of directors. He was replaced in 2002.
