= Idealism (Turkey) =

Turkish nationalist and conservative ideology

Idealism or Utopianism (Turkish: Ülkücülük, Ülkücü düşünce), also known as Türkeşism (Turkish: Türkeşçilik, Türkeşçi düşünce) is a Turkish–Islamic nationalist ideology developed by Alparslan Türkeş and the Nationalist Movement Party as a principle of the Nine Lights Doctrine.

The philosophy of Idealism was largely influenced by the ideas of Ziya Gökalp, a Turkish sociologist, writer, and poet. Gökalp believed that the Turkish people needed to create a new national identity that was distinct from their Ottoman past and grounded in their own cultural, historical, and linguistic traditions. He argued that this new identity ("Turkishness") should be based on the principles of Islam and Turkish nationalism, and that it should be promoted through education and cultural institutions.

Idealism has had a significant influence on Turkish political and intellectual thought, and its ideas continue to shape the country's political and cultural landscape today.

== Origin ==
The origins of the name go back to the terms "millî mefkure (ülkü)" used by Ziya Gökalp and "millî ülkü" used by Nihal Atsız and Pan-Turkists. 1950–1953 it was used by Turkish Nationalists Association during its years. Ülkü means "ideal" in terms of the word meaning. Ülkücülük is the equivalent of "idealism".

On 3 May 1944, a large group protested the prosecution of Nihal Atsız in Istanbul as well as in Ankara and his friends marched from the Ankara courthouse to Ulus square. Although the Turkism movement was a national policy in the state levels during the time of Atatürk, it begins with this event that it became a mass idea.

Alparslan Türkeş formed Idealism as an Islamist version of Atsızism. Idealists often insist on Islamism and nationalism being one and equal, although Idealism was designed to pick nationalism whenever nationalism and Islamism contradict. Nihal Atsız hated Idealism and viewed it as a corruption of his own teachings, and criticised Türkeş multiple times for it.

== Idealist political groups ==
- Republican Villagers Nation Party
- Nationalist Task Party
- Nationalist Movement Party
  - Idealist Hearths
- Bright Turkey Party
- Conservative Party
- Great Unity Party

== See also ==
- Conservatism in Turkey
- Politics of Turkey
- Alparslan Türkeş
- Hüseyin Nihal Atsız
- Nine Lights Doctrine
