= 38th government of Turkey =

Government of the Republic of Turkey (1974-1975)

The 38th government of Turkey (November 17, 1974 – March 31, 1975) was a caretaker government of Turkey led by Sadi Irmak, an independent member of the Turkish senate.

== Background ==
After the end of the 37th government, no parties volunteered to form coalitions with other parties. Therefore, the president asked Sadi Irmak to form a technocratic government.

== The government ==
Title	Name
Prime Minister	Sadi Irmak
Deputy Prime Minister	Zeyyat Baykara
Minister of State
Minister of State	Mehmet Özgüneş
Minister of State	Muhlis Fer
Minister of State	Salih Yıldız
Ministry of Justice	Hayri Mumcuoğlu
Ministry of National Defense	İlhami Sancar
Ministry of the Interior	Mukadder Öztekin
Ministry of Foreign Affairs	Melih Esenbel
Ministry of Finance	Bedri Gürsoy
Ministry of National Education	Sefa Reisoğlu
Ministry of Public Works	Vefa Tanır
Ministry of Commerce	Haluk Cillov
Ministry of Health and Social Security	Kemal Demir
Ministry of Customs and Monopolies	Baran Tuncer
Ministry Food, Agriculture and Animal Husbandry	Reşat Aktan
Ministry of Transport	Sabahattin Özbek
Ministry of Labour	Turhan Esener
Ministry of Industry	Mehmet Gölhan
Ministry Tourism	İlhan Eliyaoğlu
Ministry Culture	Nermin Neftçi
Ministry of Construction and Settlement	Selahattin Babüroğlu
Ministry of Energy and Natural Resources	Erhan Işıl
Ministry of Village Affairs and Cooperatives	İsmail Hakı Aydınoğlu
Ministry of Forestry	Fikret Saatçioğlu
Ministry of Youth and Sports	Zeki Baloğlu

== Aftermath ==
The government did not receive the vote of confidence, but it continued until the formation of the next government. Thus, without a vote of confidence, it continued to rule for more than four months until the 39th government.

Preceded by 37th government of Turkey (Bülent Ecevit)	38th Government of Turkey; 17 November 1974 – 31 March 1975	Succeeded by 39th government of Turkey (Süleyman Demirel)
