= Istanbul University Faculty of Economics =

Turkish university department

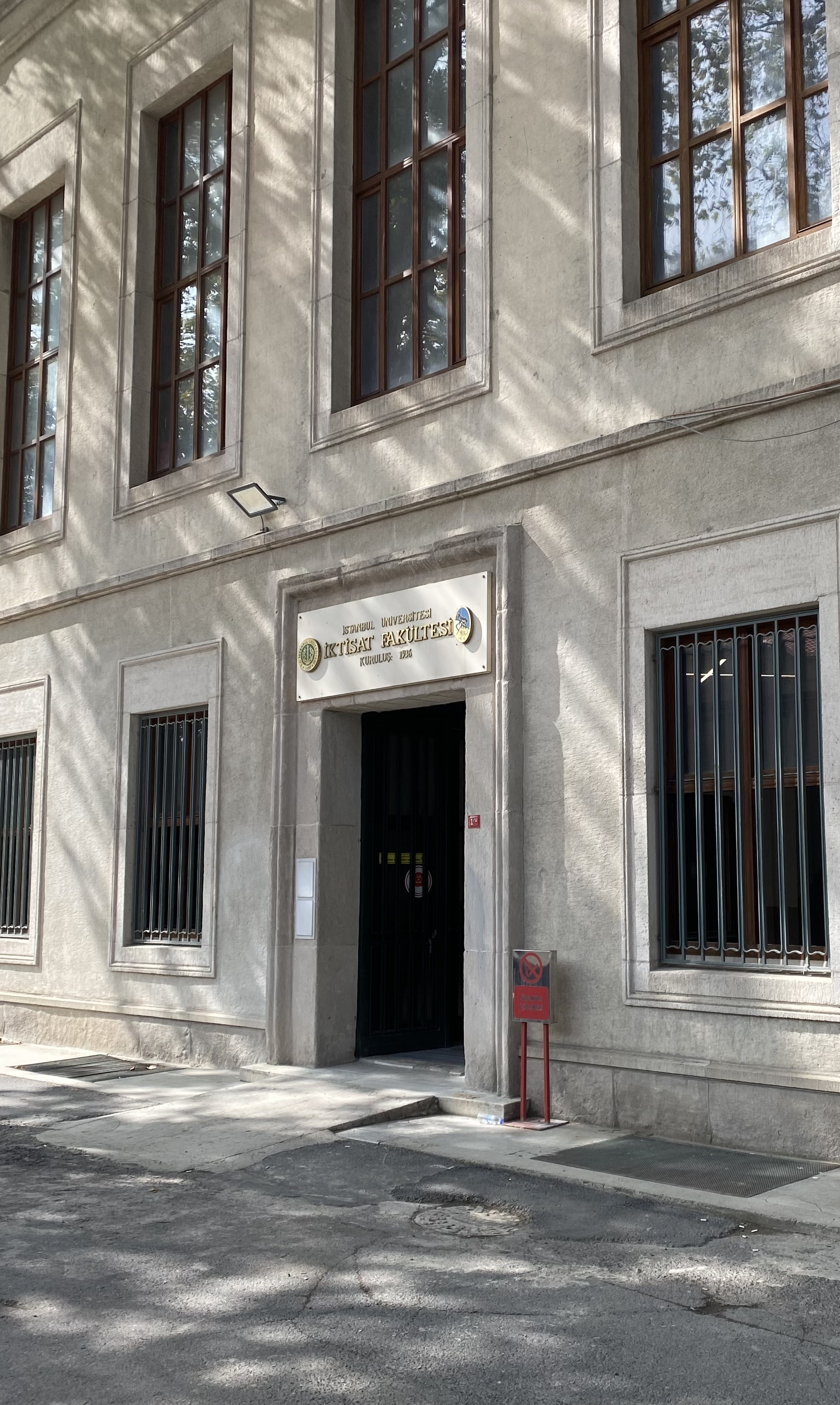
Entrance of the Istanbul University Faculty of Economics

Istanbul University Faculty of Economics is recognized as the first educational institution in Turkey to be designated specifically as a Faculty of Economics. This faculty, part of Istanbul University—the oldest and largest university in the country, established in 1453—was founded on December 14, 1936. It is situated on the Beyazıt Campus of Istanbul University.

== History ==
During the establishment phase of the Faculty of Economics at Istanbul University, the institution became a refuge for notable European scholars escaping Nazi persecution. These scholars included Ord. Prof. Umberto Ricci, Ord. Prof. Joseph Dobretsberger, Ord. Prof. Wilhelm Röpke, Ord. Prof. Fritz Neumark, Ord. Prof. Alexander Rüstow, Ord. Prof. Alfred Isaac and Ord. Prof. Gerhard Kessler. Their contributions were instrumental in shaping the academic and intellectual landscape of the faculty.

The Faculty of Economics at Istanbul University commenced its educational programs on March 4, 1937, with an initial enrollment of 118 students. The first cohort of graduates completed their studies at the end of the 1939-1940 academic year. Among these graduates, Adnan Altay Özbek was distinguished as the first male graduate, receiving diploma number 1, and Fatma Zehra Bereket was the first female graduate, receiving diploma number 2. Three years after celebrating its initial graduates, the Faculty of Economics Alumni Association was established on March 1, 1943, to foster connections among its alumni. Later, the Istanbul University Faculty of Economics Alumni and Members Foundation, commonly known as the Economics Foundation, was established on November 13, 1986. Notably, Abdullah Gül, the 11th president of Turkey, is an alumnus of the IU Faculty of Economics.

== Organisation ==
- Department of Economics in English
- Department of Economics
- Department of Labor Economics and Industrial Relations
- Department of Finance
- Department of Econometrics
- Department of Political Science and International Relations
- Department of Business Administration
- Department of Tourism Management
- Management information systems
