= Ferruh Bozbeyli =

10th Speaker of the Parliament of the Republic of Turkey from 1965 to 1970

Ferruh Bozbeyli MP

Speaker of the National Assembly
- In office 22 October 1965 – 19 October 1970
- Preceded by: Fuat Sirmen
- Succeeded by: Sabit Osman Avcı

Chairman of Democratic Party
- In office 18 December 1970 – 18 December 1978

Personal details
- Born: 21 January 1927 Pazarcık, Turkey
- Died: 28 July 2019 (aged 92) Ankara, Turkey

Ahmet Ferruh Bozbeyli (21 January 1927 – 28 July 2019) was a Turkish politician who served as the speaker of Turkish parliament and the chairman of the Democratic party.

== Early life ==
Born in Pazarcık of Kahramanmaraş Province on 21 January 1927. His father's name was Sıddık. His mother died during his birth. After his elementary education in his home town and secondary education in Antakya in 1947, he travelled to Istanbul for university. He finished the law school of Istanbul University in 1957 and he began serving as an attorney. During the Yassıada trials he was one of the attorneys who defended the former Democrat Party politicians.

== Parliament speaker ==
In 1961, he became a member of the newly founded Justice Party (AP) and in the elections held on 15 December 1961 he was elected as an MP from Istanbul Province. During his second term between 1965 and 1969 he was elected as the speaker of the Turkish parliament. He kept this position in his third term after 1969.

== Democratic Party ==
In AP Bozbeyli was a part of a group known as the supporters of the pre-1960 Democrat Party politicians. They accused AP leadership of being uninterested in the political rights of the former politicians. In 1970 October Ferruh Bozbeyli resigned from his post in the parliament administration. One month later he also resigned with 40 other MPs (so-called 41s) from his party to form a new party. They founded Democratic Party (DP) on 18 December 1970 and Ferruh Bozbeyli became the chairman of the new party.

== 1973 and 1977 ==
In the presidential elections of 1973 held in the parliament, he was the candidate of his party. But he couldn't get any support other than that of his own party and consequently he lost the election. In the general elections held on 14 October 1973 in which he was reelected as an MP from Istanbul Province, DP received 11.9% of votes and sent 45 representatives to the lower house of the parliament. (It was the third party in terms of the vote percentage and fourth party in terms of the number of representatives.) But after 1973 the party began losing support and in the elections held on 5 June 1977 DP was severely defeated. Even Bozbeyli was unable to be elected. After this defeat Bozbeyli resigned from his post in the party and quit from politics on 18 December 1978.

== Later life ==
In later years he served in the board of directors of Türkiye İş Bankası and between 1990 and 1992 he was the chairman of the board. He wrote the following books:

- Türkiye'de Siyasal Partilerin Ekonomik ve Sosyal Görüşleri (1969, "Social and political programs of the political parties in Turkey")
- Demokratik Sağ (1976, "Democratic Right")
- Politika Sanatı (1980 "Art of Politics")
- Yalnız Demokrat (2009, "Lonely Democrat", memoirs)

== Death ==
Bozbeyli died at a hospital in Ankara on 28 July 2019 where he had been treated for kidney and lung diseases. He was interred at Turkish State Cemetery (Turkish: Devlet Mezarlığı) in Ankara after a state funeral was held one day later.

Picture of his grave:

Political offices
Preceded by Fuat Sirmen	Speaker of the Parliament of Turkey; 22 October 1965 – 1 November 1970	Succeeded by Sabit Osman Avcı
