= Fuat Sirmen =

9th Speaker of the Parliament of the Republic of Turkey from 1961 to 1965

Fuat Sirmen MP
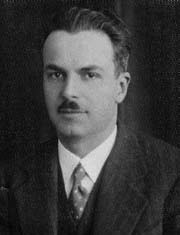

Minister of Economy
- In office 9 March 1943 – 7 August 1946
- President: İsmet İnönü
- Preceded by: Sırrı Day
- Succeeded by: Bekir Balta

Minister of Justice
- In office 10 June 1948 – 22 May 1950
- President: İsmet İnönü
- Preceded by: Şinası Devrin
- Succeeded by: Hilmi Özyörük

Speaker of the National Assembly
- In office 1 November 1961 – 22 October 1965
- Preceded by: Refik Koraltan
- Succeeded by: Ferruh Bozbeyli

Personal details
- Born: 21 November 1899 Istanbul, Ottoman Empire
- Died: 17 May 1981 (aged 81) Istanbul, Turkey

Fuat Sirmen (21 November 1899 – 17 May 1981) was a Turkish politician.

== Early life ==
He was born in Istanbul in 1899. He graduated from the law school in 1924 and two years later he was sent to Rome for further studies by the Ministry of Justice. After his doctorate studies in the Law school of Rome University in 1930, he returned to Turkey and served in the Ministry of Justice.

== Political career ==
In 1935 he began his political career in the Republican People's Party (CHP). He was elected MP from Erzurum Province and later Rize Province. Between 9 March 1943 and 7 August 1946 he served as the Minister of Economy in the 14th government of Turkey. (Second Şükrü Saraçoğlu government) Between 10 June 1948 and 22 May 1950 he served as the Minister of Justice in the 17th and 18th government of Turkey (Second Hasan Saka and Şemsettin Günaltay governments). In 1950 elections he lost his seat and began serving as an attorney.

In 1961 he was elected as an MP from Rize Province. On 1 November the same year he was elected as the Speaker of the Turkish parliament (Lower House). He continued until 22 October 1965. In 1965 elections in which his party was defeated he was elected as MP from Istanbul Province. But his position as the parliament speaker ended. He also finished his political life in 1969.

== Death ==
He died of cancer in 1981 in Istanbul. He was laid to rest in Zincirlikuyu Cemetery.

Political offices
Preceded by Kazım Orbay	Speaker of the Parliament of Turkey; 1 November 1961 – 22 October 1965	Succeeded by Ferruh Bozbeyli
