= Necmettin Karaduman =

14th Speaker of the Parliament of the Republic of Turkey from 1983 to 1987

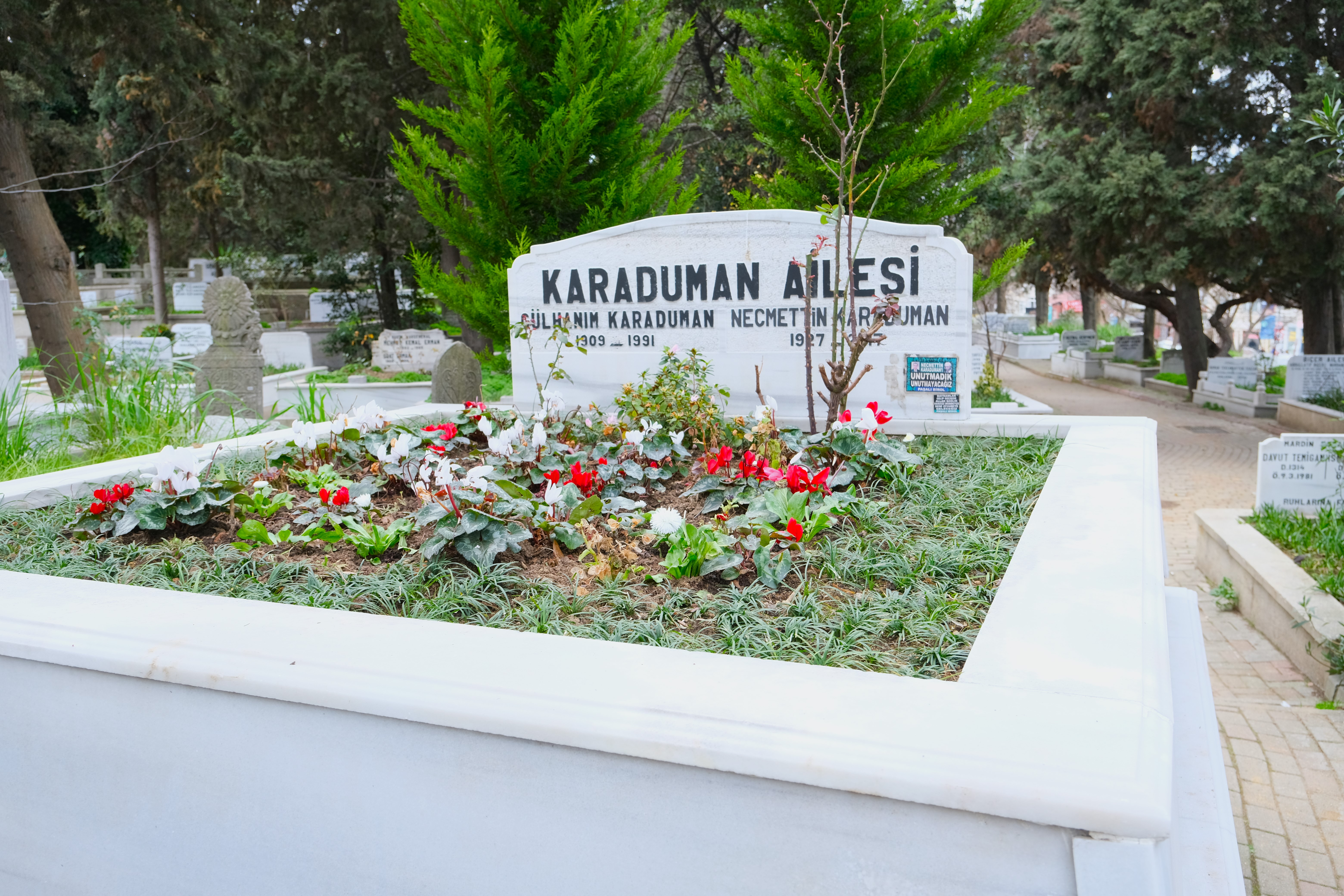
- Grave of Necmettin Karaduman, Karacaahmet Cemetery, Istanbul, Türkiye.

Speaker of the Grand National Assembly
- In office December 4, 1983 – November 29, 1987
- President: Kenan Evren
- Preceded by: Sadi Irmak
- Succeeded by: Yıldırım Akbulut

Personal details
- Born: 1927 Trabzon, Turkey
- Died: June 22, 2017 (aged 90) Istanbul, Turkey
- Party: ANAP
- Spouse: Selma (Kısakürek) Karaduman
- Profession: Politician

Necmettin Karaduman (1927, Trabzon – 22 June 2017, Istanbul) was a Turkish politician, who was the Speaker of the Grand National Assembly of Turkey.

Political offices
Preceded by Sadi Irmak	Speaker of the Parliament of Turkey; Dec 24, 1983 – Nov 29, 1987	Succeeded by Yıldırım Akbulut
