= Sabit Osman Avcı =

11th Speaker of the Parliament of the Republic of Turkey from 1970 to 1973

Minister of Forest
- In office August 11, 1969 – November 3, 1969
- Prime Minister: Süleyman Demirel
- Preceded by: New established
- Succeeded by: Hüseyin Özalp

Minister of Energy and Natural Resources
- In office November 3, 1969 – November 28, 1970
- Prime Minister: Süleyman Demirel
- Preceded by: Refet Sezgin
- Succeeded by: Mehmet Selahattin Kılıç

Speaker of the National Assembly
- In office November 26, 1970 – October 14, 1973
- President: Cevdet Sunay, Tekin Arıburun, Fahri Korutürk
- Preceded by: Ferruh Bozbeyli
- Succeeded by: Kemal Güven

Personal details
- Born: 1921 Artvin, Turkey
- Died: February 8, 2009 (aged 88) Istanbul, Turkey
- Party: AP
- Profession: Politician

Sabit Osman Avcı (1921 – February 8, 2009) was a Turkish politician, who served as government minister and the Speaker of the Grand National Assembly.

Political offices
Preceded by New established	Minister of Forest; Aug 11, 1969 – Nov 3, 1969	Succeeded by Hüseyin Özalp
Preceded by Refet Sezgin	Minister of Energy and Natural Resources; Nov 3, 1969 – Nov 28, 1970	Succeeded by Mehmet Selahattin Kılıç
Preceded by Ferruh Bozbeyli	Speaker of the Parliament of Turkey; Nov 26, 1970 – Oct 14, 1973	Succeeded by Kemal Güven
