= Kemal Güven =

12th Speaker of the Turkish Parliament from 1973 to 1977

Speaker of the National Assembly
- In office 18 December 1973 – 5 June 1977
- President: Fahri Korutürk
- Preceded by: Sabit Osman Avcı
- Succeeded by: Cahit Karakaş

Personal details
- Born: 7 December 1921 Erzincan, Turkey
- Died: 10 July 2013 (aged 91) Ankara, Turkey
- Party: Republican People's Party (CHP)
- Education: Ankara University, Law School

Kemal Güven (7 December 1921 – 10 July 2013) was a former speaker of the Turkish parliament.

== Early life ==
His family is from Erzincan. He was born in Maçka (in Trabzon Province) where his father was serving as a civil servant in 1921. He graduated from the high school in Kars in 1940 and the Law school of Ankara University in 1944. He was one of the earliest graduates of the faculty. He served as the public prosecutor in Posof, Tuzluca and Kağızman.

== Political life ==
He attended the Republican People's Party (CHP). In 1954, 1957 and 1961 he was elected MP from Kars Province. In 1965, he briefly returned to his profession in Ankara as the vice public prosecutor. In 1969, 1973 and 1977 he was reelected MP from Kars Province and served till the Turkish coup d'etat, 1980 on 12 September 1980.

In 1973, during the 15th term of the Turkish parliament he was elected as the speaker of the Turkish Parliament a post he kept till 1977.

== Death ==
He died on 10 July 2013 in Ankara. Following the official ceremony, he was laid to rest in the Turkish State Cemetery.

Political offices
Preceded by Sabit Osman Avcı	Speaker of the Parliament of Turkey; 1973 - 1977	Succeeded by Cahit Karakaş
