= 1973 Turkish general election =

← 1969	14 October 1973	1977 →

450 seats in the Grand National Assembly 226 seats needed for a majority
- Turnout: 66.82% (▲2.47pp)
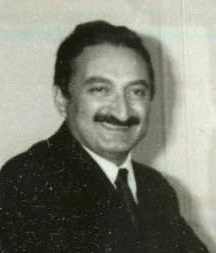

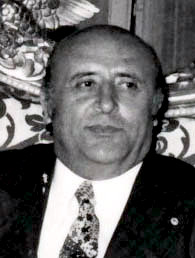

	First party	Second party
Leader	Bülent Ecevit	Süleyman Demirel
Party	CHP	AP
Last election	27.36%, 143 seats	46.53%, 256 seats
Seats won	185	149
Seat change	▲42	▼107
Popular vote	3,570,583	3,197,897
Percentage	33.30%	29.82%
Swing	▲5.94pp	▼16.71pp
	Third party	Fourth party
Leader	Ferruh Bozbeyli	Süleyman Ârif Emre
Party	DP	MSP
Last election	–	–
Seats won	45	48
Seat change	New	New
Popular vote	1,275,502	1,265,771
Percentage	11.89%	11.80%
Swing	New	New
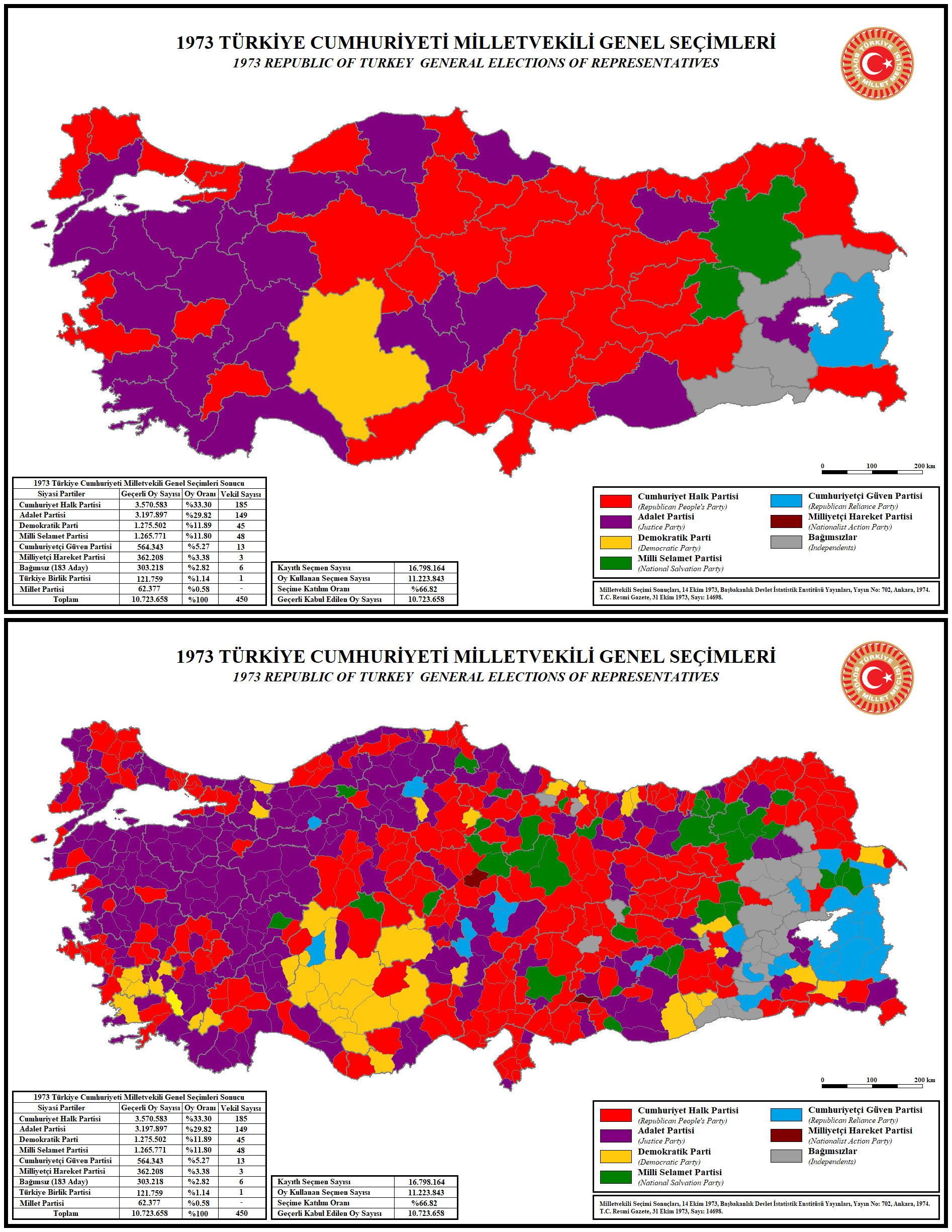
- Largest party by province.
Prime Minister before election
Naim Talu
Elected Prime Minister
Bülent Ecevit
CHP

General elections were held in Turkey on 14 October 1973, on the same day as for the senate. The Republican People's Party (CHP) emerged as the largest party, winning 185 of the 450 seats with 33% of the vote. The Justice Party (AP) led by Süleyman Demirel, which had won a majority in the previous elections in 1969, lost over a third of its seats, winning just 149. This was a result of two new parties, the National Salvation Party and the Democratic Party, splitting the right-wing vote.

The CHP formed a government with the religious-oriented National Salvation Party on 26 January 1974. However, the government lasted only ten months before its fall.

== Party endorsements ==
Within the left-wing prisoners jailed in Mamak following the 1971 Turkish military memorandum, the Revolutionary Youth Federation of Turkey (DEV-GENÇ), People's Liberation Party-Front of Turkey and People's Liberation Army of Turkey members supported voting for Republican People's Party of Bülent Ecevit meanwhile Revolutionary Workers' and Peasants' Party of Turkey boycotted the elections.

== Results ==
Voter turnout was 66.8%.

Party	Votes	%	Seats	+/–
Republican People's Party	3,570,583	33.30	185	+42
Justice Party	3,197,897	29.82	149	–107
Democratic Party	1,275,502	11.89	45	New
National Salvation Party	1,265,771	11.80	48	New
Republican Reliance Party	564,343	5.26	13	–2
Nationalist Movement Party	362,208	3.38	3	+2
Unity Party	121,759	1.14	1	–7
Nation Party	62,377	0.58	0	–6
Independents	303,218	2.83	6	–7
Total	10,723,658	100.00	450	0
Valid votes	10,723,658	95.54		
Invalid/blank votes	500,185	4.46		
Total votes	11,223,843	100.00		
Registered voters/turnout	16,798,164	66.82		
Source: Nohlen et al.
