= Republican Party (Turkey) =

Former political party in Turkey

Republican Party (Turkish: Cumhuriyetçi Parti, CP) was a former political party in Turkey.

The Republican People's Party (CHP) which is usually credited as the founder of the Turkish Republic in 1923 was the oldest party in Turkey. But after the party adopted the policy of so-called left of center in the 1960s, two groups of MPs broke away from the party. The first group in 1967 founded the Reliance Party. The Republican Party was founded by the second group in 1972.

The party was founded on 4 September 1972. The chairman of the party was Kemal Satır, an ex vice prime minister. But it was a short lived party. On 28 February 1973 it was merged to the National Reliance Party (a.k.a. Reliance Party), which was renamed as the Republican Reliance Party.
