= Nationalist Movement Party =

Turkish far-right ultranationalist political party

Nationalist Movement Party Milliyetçi Hareket Partisi
- Abbreviation: MHP
- President: Devlet Bahçeli
- Founder: Alparslan Türkeş
- Founded: 9 February 1969; 57 years ago 24 January 1993; 33 years ago (re-establishment)
- Preceded by: Republican Villagers Nation Party; National Activity and Vigorous Development
- Youth wing: Grey Wolves
- Paramilitary wing: Grey Wolves (1969–1980)
- Membership (2026): ▲501,122
- Ideology: Turkish ultranationalism; Turkish–Islamic synthesis; National conservatism; Right-wing populism; Euroscepticism; Neo-fascism
- Political position: Far-right
- National affiliation: People's Alliance
- Colours: Red and grey (official); Ruby red (customary)
- Slogan: Ülkenin Geleceğine Oy Ver ('Vote for the Country's Future')
- Grand National Assembly: 46 / 600
- Provinces: 8 / 51
- District municipalities: 111 / 973
- Belde Municipalities: 98 / 390
- Provincial councilors: 207 / 1,282
- Municipal Assemblies: 2,715 / 20,953

Party flag

Website
- www.mhp.org.tr

The Nationalist Movement Party, or alternatively translated as Nationalist Action Party (Turkish: Milliyetçi Hareket Partisi, MHP), is a far-right, ultranationalist political party in Turkey. The party is neo-fascist and has been linked to violent paramilitaries and organized crime groups. The party's youth wing is the Grey Wolves (Bozkurtlar) organization, which is also known as the "Nationalist Hearths" (Ülkü Ocakları). The Grey Wolves were heavily involved during the political violence in Turkey in the 1970s.

The party was formed in 1969 by former Turkish Army colonel Alparslan Türkeş, who had become leader of the Republican Villagers Nation Party (CKMP) in 1965. He founded the party after criticizing the Republican People's Party (CHP) for moving too far away from the nationalist principles of their founder Mustafa Kemal Atatürk, claiming that he would not have founded the MHP had the CHP not deviated from Atatürk's ideology. The party mainly followed a Pan-Turkist and Turkish nationalist political agenda throughout the latter half of the 20th century. The MHP won enough seats in the 1973 and 1977 general election to take part in the "Nationalist Front" governments during the 1970s, those being the 39th and 41st governments. The party was banned following the 1980 coup, but re-established with its original name in 1993. After participating in a coalition government in the 2002 general election, the MHP fell below the 10% election threshold and lost all of its parliamentary representation after the newly formed Justice and Development Party (AKP) won a plurality.

After the 2007 general election, in which the MHP won back its parliamentary representation used to be fiercely critical of the governing AKP over government corruption and authoritarianism. Nevertheless, the MHP has often been referred to by critics as the "AKP's lifeline", having covertly helped the AKP in situations such as the 2007 presidential election, repealing the headscarf ban, and the June–July 2015 parliamentary speaker elections. Since 2016, Bahçeli and the MHP has been a key ally of Erdoğan and the AKP. This caused a schism within the party, resulting in Meral Akşener and other prominent members leaving MHP to find the anti-Erdoğanist İYİ Party. MHP currently supports a minority government led by the AKP.

== History ==
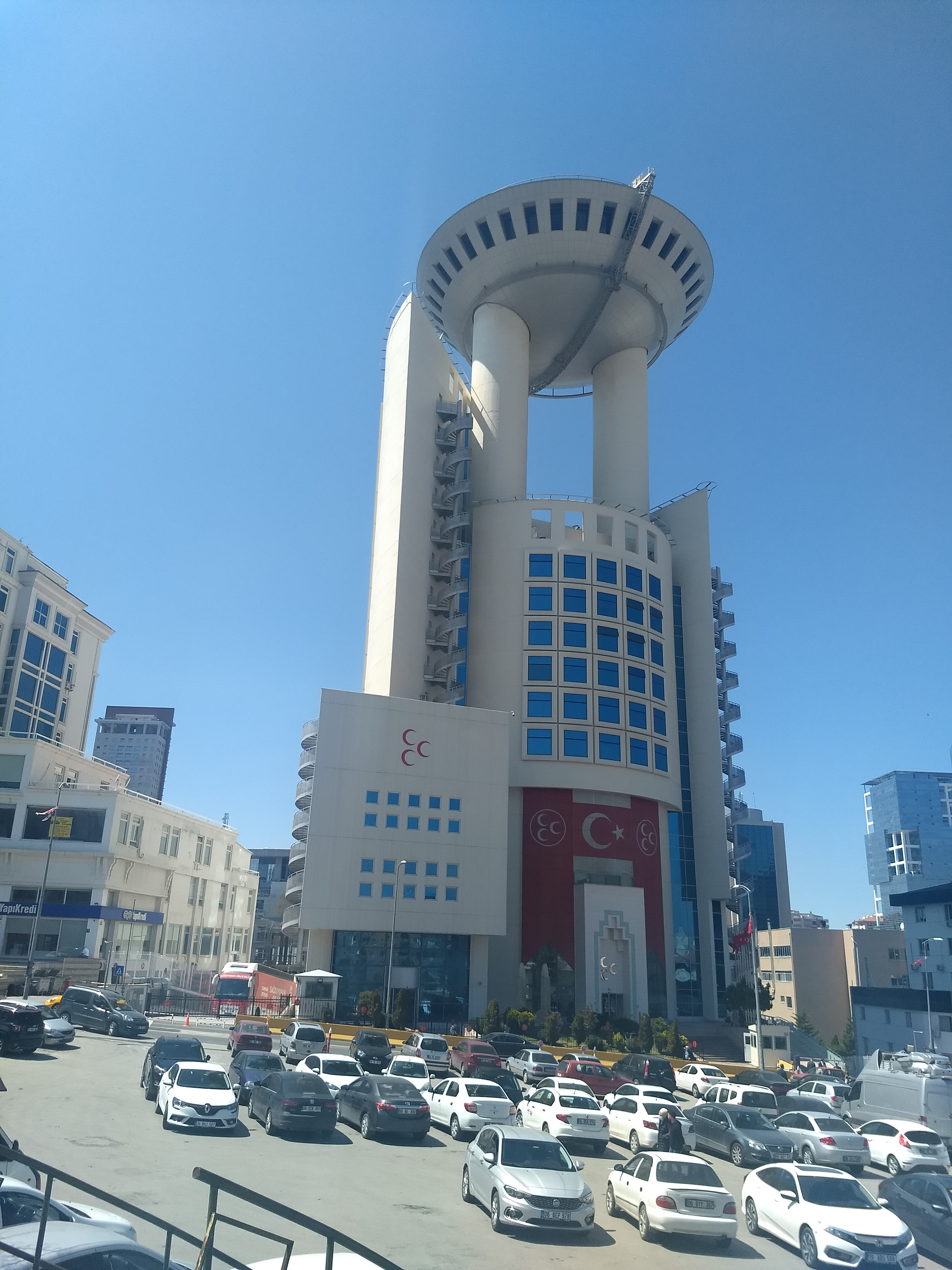
MHP Headquarters in Balgat, Ankara

=== Before 1980 ===
In 1965, nationalist politician and ex-Colonel Alparslan Türkeş, who had trained in the United States for NATO, founded the Turkish Gladio Special Warfare Department, gained control of the conservative rural Republican Villagers Nation Party (Turkish: Cumhuriyetçi Köylü Millet Partisi, CKMP). During an Extraordinary Great Congress held at Adana in Turkey on 1969, Türkeş changed the name of the party to the Nationalist Movement Party (MHP) and with the support of Dündar Taşer, a party logo depicting the three crescent was elected.

The MHP embraced Turkish nationalism, and under the leadership of Türkeş, militias connected to the party were responsible for assassinating numerous left-wing intellectuals and academics, including some Kurds, during the 1970s. The leader of the party's youth wing, known as the Grey Wolves after Turkic mythology, claimed that they had an intelligence organization that was superior to the state's own.

On the other hand, MHP had links to the Aydınlar Ocağı (AO; "Hearth of Intellectuals"), a right-wing think tank launched in 1970 by established university professors, which served as a connecting link between secular-conservative, nationalist and Islamic rightists, promoting the ideology of Turkish-Islamic synthesis. AO's ideas, which have been compared to those of the French Nouvelle Droite, had a determining influence on MHP's programmes and served to lend the far-right party a more legitimate, respectable appearance.

The MHP won enough seats in the 1973 and 1977 general election to take part in the "Nationalist Front" governments during the 1970s. The party infiltrated the bureaucracy during these governments during the height of the political violence between rightists and leftists. Many supporters of MHP were killed during this period in incidents such the Ümraniye massacre, with prominent figures being assassinated by left-wing militants, and local party headquarters being targeted with bomb attacks. On 27 May 1980, the party's deputy leader and former government minister Gün Sazak was assassinated by members of the Marxist–Leninist militant group Revolutionary Left (Turkish: Devrimci Sol or Dev Sol) in front of his home.

When the Turkish army seized power on 12 September 1980, in a violent coup d'état led by General Kenan Evren, the party was banned, along with all other active political parties at the time, and many of its leading members were imprisoned. Many party members joined the liberal conservative Motherland Party or various Islamist parties. Party member, Agah Oktay Güner, noted that the party's ideology (Turkish-Islamic synthesis) was in power while its members were in prison.

=== Re-establishment ===
The party was reformed in 1983 under the name "Conservative Party" (Turkish: Muhafazakar Parti). After 1985, however, the name was changed to the "Nationalist Task Party" (Turkish: Milliyetçi Çalışma Partisi) then back again to its former name in 1992. In 1993, Muhsin Yazıcıoğlu and five other deputies separated and founded the Great Union Party, which is an Islamist party.

=== Devlet Bahçeli ===
After Türkeş's death, Devlet Bahçeli was elected his successor. The party won 18% of the vote and 129 seats in the election that followed, in 1999, its best ever result. Bahçeli subsequently became Deputy Prime Minister after entering a coalition with the Democratic Left Party (DSP) and the Motherland Party (ANAP), though his calls for an early election resulted in the government's collapse in 2002. In the subsequent 2002 general election, the MHP fell below the 10% election threshold and lost all of its parliamentary representation after the newly formed Justice and Development Party (AKP) won a plurality.

After the 2007 general election, in which the MHP won back its parliamentary representation with 14.27% of the vote, the party has strongly opposed the peace negotiations between the government and the Kurdistan Workers Party and used to be fiercely critical of the governing AKP over government corruption and authoritarianism. Nevertheless, the MHP has often been referred to by critics as the "AKP's lifeline", having covertly helped the AKP in situations such as the 2007 presidential election, repealing the headscarf ban, and the June–July 2015 parliamentary speaker elections. Since 2015, Bahçeli has been openly supporting Erdogan and the AKP. This caused a schism within the party, resulting in Meral Akşener leaving MHP to found the center-right İYİ Party. The MHP supported a 'Yes' vote in the 2017 referendum, and formed the People's Alliance electoral pact with the AKP for the 2018 Turkish general election. MHP currently supports a minority government led by the AKP, and has 48 MPs in the Turkish Parliament.

== Ideology ==
The MHP represents the Nine-Light doctrine, based on ultranationalism shaped by Islam. The MHP is widely described as a neo-fascist party. (Note: linked to extremist and violent militias, as well as organized crime groups.) Since the 1990s it has, under the leadership of Devlet Bahçeli, gradually moderated its programme, turning from ethnic to cultural nationalism and conservatism and stressing the unitary nature of the Turkish state. MHP's mainstream overture has strongly increased its appeal to voters and it has grown to the country's third-strongest party, continuously represented in the National Assembly since 2007 with voter shares well above the 10% threshold. The party has also been described as following the ideology of Islamokemalism and espousing Turkish–Islamic nationalism.

=== Opposition to the HDP ===
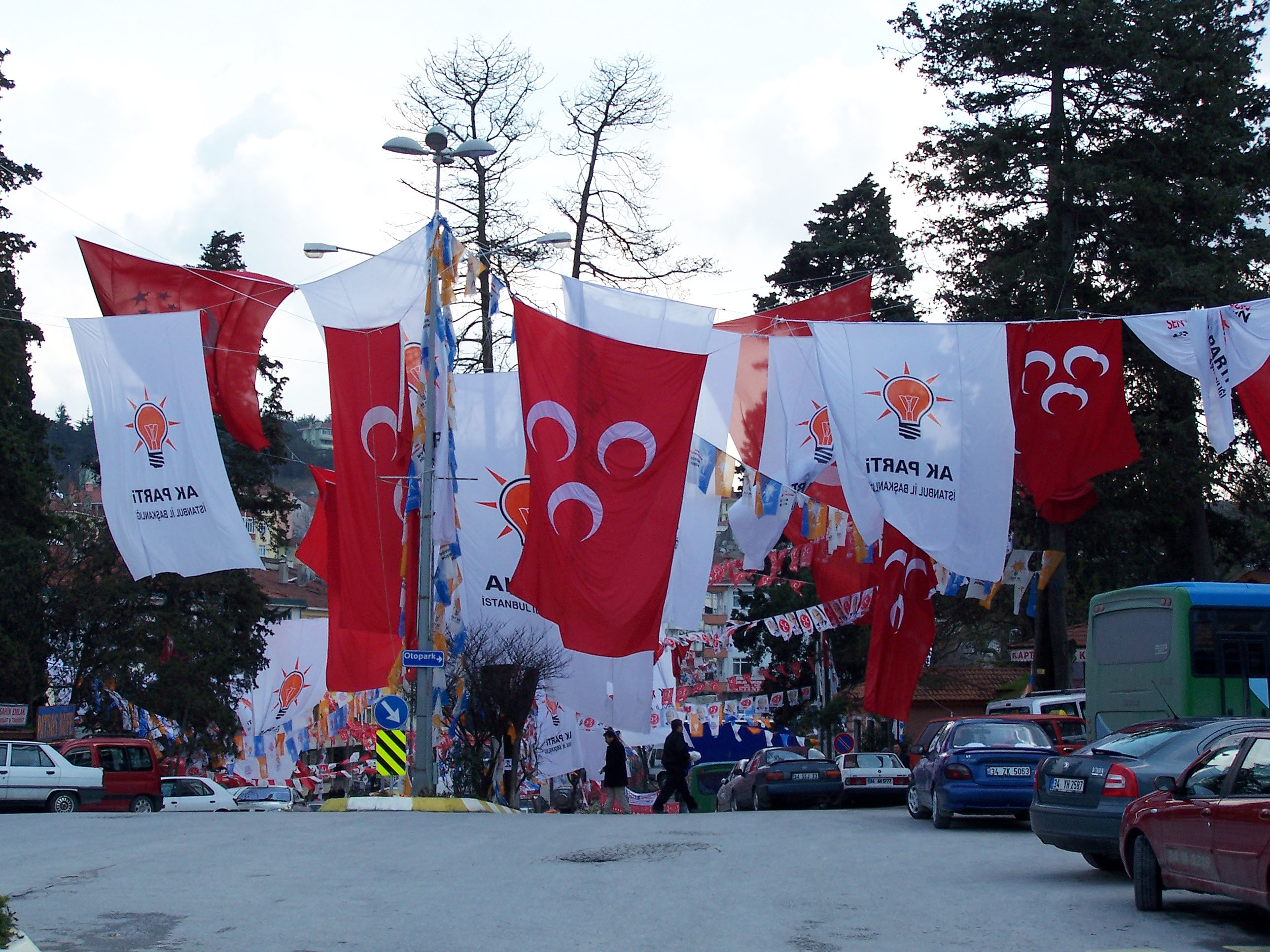
Flags of political parties before the Turkish municipal elections in Şile, Turkey. The most visible ones are MHP and AKP (Justice and Development Party) flags.

Due to their ideological differences, the MHP is strongly opposed to any form of dialogue with the left-wing pro-Kurdish Peoples' Democratic Party (HDP), which Devlet Bahçeli has often opposed by voting against in Parliament. A notable example was in the June–July 2015 parliamentary speaker elections, where the MHP declared that they would not support any candidate and cast blank votes after the HDP announced support for the Republican People's Party (CHP) candidate Deniz Baykal. The MHP also ruled out any prospect of a coalition government that receives support from the HDP after the June 2015 general election resulted in a hung parliament, even rejecting CHP leader Kemal Kılıçdaroğlu's offer of Bahçeli becoming Prime Minister in such a coalition. MHP deputy leader Celal Adan claimed that 'even using our party's name in the same sentence as the HDP will be counted as cruelty by us.'

The party strongly opposed the peace negotiations between the government and the Kurdistan Workers Party.

In early September 2015, the MHP and the HDP both voted against the new interim election government ministers from taking their oaths of office, causing speculation of whether the MHP was dropping their harsh stance against the HDP. However, Semih Yalçın downplayed any notions of an alliance between the two parties, stating that "a broken clock will still show the correct time once a day, the HDP can sometimes take a correct decision in Parliament. Showing this as a 'MHP-HDP coalition' is a deliberate diversion." In 2021 Bahçeli has demanded the closure of the HDP in several speeches, a move that is considered un-democratic and authoritarian.

In early 2025, MHP leader Devlet Bahçeli engaged in unprecedented dialogue with the Kurdish-oriented DEM Party, a successor to the HDP, following a call for peace from imprisoned PKK leader Abdullah Öcalan. This initiative led to a ceasefire declaration by the PKK in March 2025. However, Bahçeli has consistently rejected any association with the HDP. He has reiterated calls for the HDP's closure, viewing the party's activities as incompatible with national unity.

=== Economic policy ===
During the June 2015 Turkish general election, the MHP announced a new economic manifesto. The MHP promised to improve the situation of Turkey's working poor by lifting taxes on diesel and fertiliser, raising the net minimum wage to $518, giving a $37 transportation subsidy to every minimum wage worker, and giving those who cannot afford a house an additional $92 per month in rental aid. The MHP said these policies would allow a minimum wage earner living in a big city to earn as much an extra $646 annually.

The MHP stated that their economic policies would create 700,000 jobs, increase the national income per person to $13.3K, and increase exports to $238 billion while keeping annual growth at 5.2 percent between 2016 and 2019, although this did not occur, as the GDP per capita and standard of living plummeted in Turkey from 12,614 USD in 2014 to 9,126 in 2019.

=== Foreign policy ===
In July 2015, amidst a wave of protests against the Xinjiang conflict, MHP-affiliated Ülkücü attacked South Korean tourists on Istanbul's Sultanahmet Square. In an interview with Turkish columnist Ahmet Hakan, MHP leader Devlet Bahçeli played the attacks down, stating that "These are young kids. They may have been provoked. Plus, how are you going to differentiate between Korean and Chinese? They both have slanted eyes. Does it really matter?" Bahçeli's remarks, including a banner reading "We crave Chinese blood" at the Ülkücü Istanbul headquarters, caused an uproar in both Turkish and international media.

In September 2025, MHP leader Devlet Bahçeli proposed an alliance between Turkey, China and Russia to counter the United States-Israel alliance.

== Party leaders ==
#	Leader (birth–death)	Portrait	Constituency	Took office	Left office
1	Alparslan Türkeş (1917–1997)		Ankara (1965); Adana (1969, 1973, 1977); Yozgat (1991)	8 February 1969	4 April 1997
–	Muhittin Çolak (acting)			5 April 1997	6 July 1997
2	Devlet Bahçeli (1948–)		Osmaniye (1999, 2007, 2011, Jun/Nov 2015, 2018, 2023)	6 July 1997	Incumbent

== Election results ==
=== General elections ===
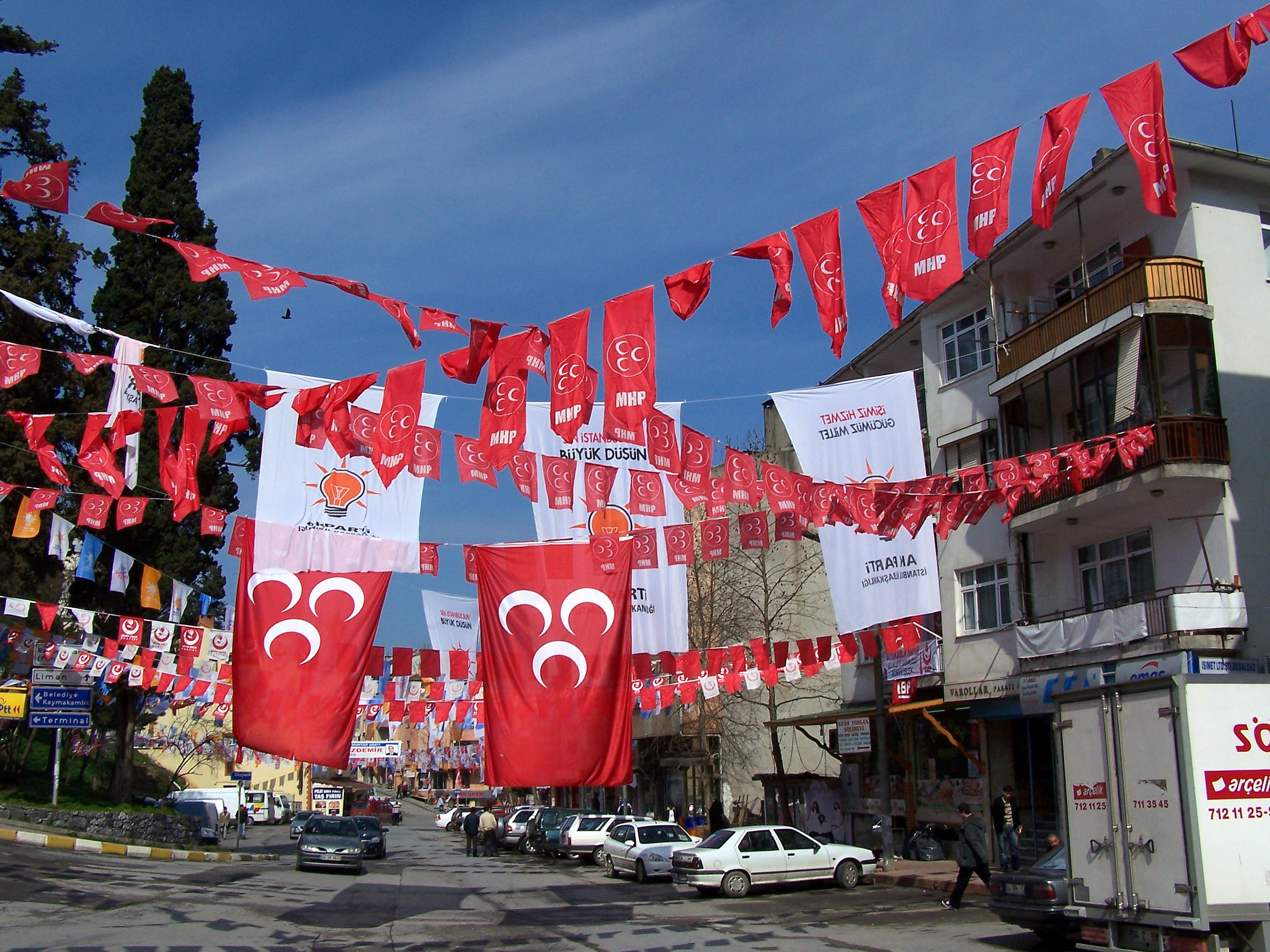
Flags of political parties before the Turkish municipal elections in Şile, Istanbul, March 2009

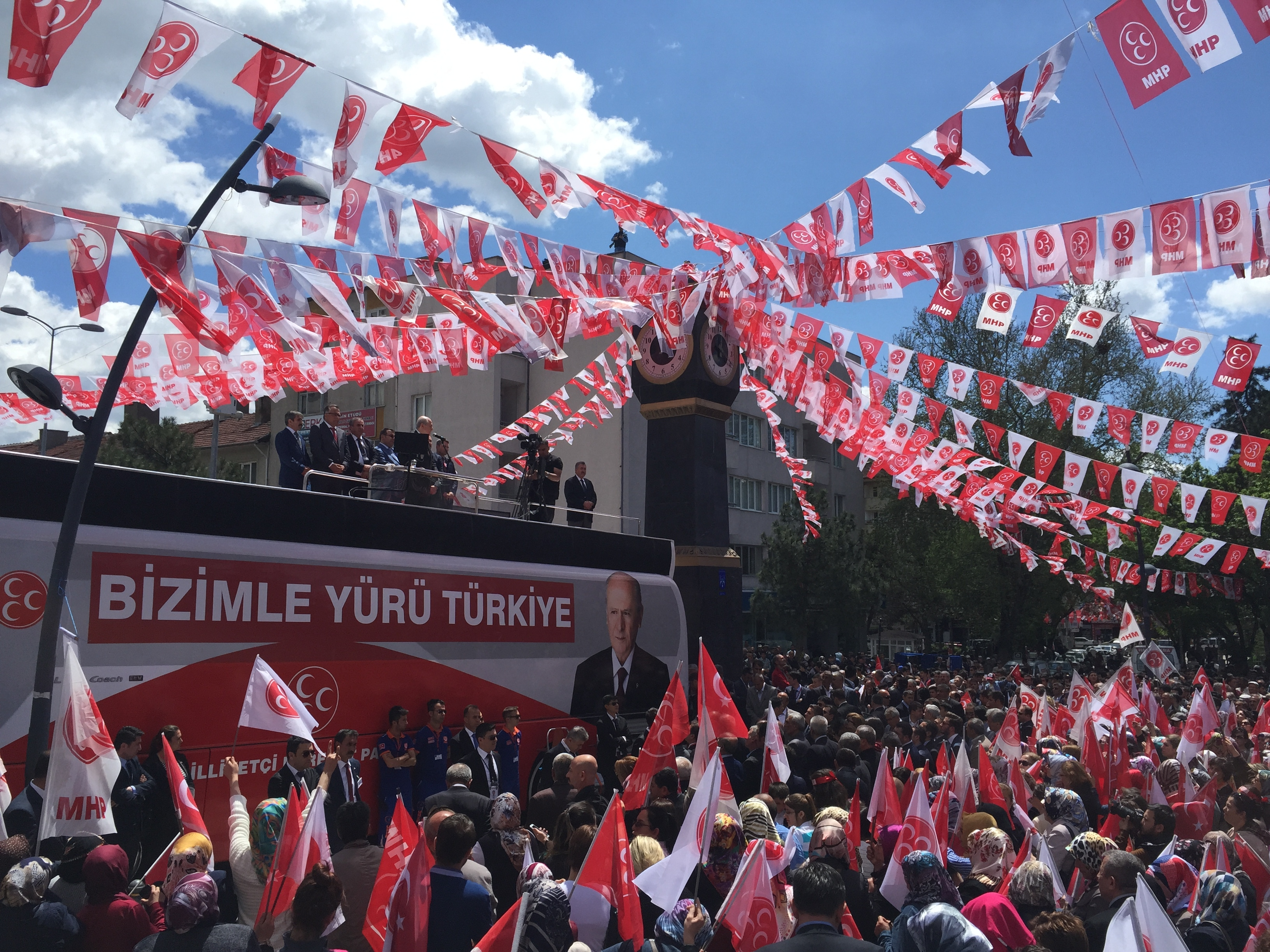
The MHP holding its electoral rally in Ankara, May 2015

Grand National Assembly of Turkey
Election date	Party leader	Number of votes received	Percentage of votes	Number of deputies	Position
1969	Alparslan Türkeş	275,091	3.03%	1 / 450	Opposition
1973	Alparslan Türkeş	362,208	3.38%	3 / 450	Opposition
1977	Alparslan Türkeş	951,544	6.42%	16 / 450	Coalition government
1983	Party closed following the 1980 Turkish coup d'état and succeeded by the Nationalist Task Party (1985–93). MHP was re-established in 1993.				
1987	Party closed following the 1980 Turkish coup d'état and succeeded by the Nationalist Task Party (1985–93). MHP was re-established in 1993.				
1991	Party closed following the 1980 Turkish coup d'état and succeeded by the Nationalist Task Party (1985–93). MHP was re-established in 1993.				
1995	Alparslan Türkeş	2,301,343	8.18%	0 / 550	Extra-parliamentary opposition
1999	Devlet Bahçeli	5,606,584	17.98%	129 / 550	Coalition government
2002	Devlet Bahçeli	2,635,787	8.36%	0 / 550	Extra-parliamentary opposition
2007	Devlet Bahçeli	5,001,869	14.27%	71 / 550	Opposition
2011	Devlet Bahçeli	5,585,513	13.01%	53 / 550	Opposition
June 2015	Devlet Bahçeli	7,520,006	16.29%	80 / 550	Opposition
November 2015	Devlet Bahçeli	5,694,136	11.90%	40 / 550	Opposition
2018	Devlet Bahçeli	5,565,331	11.10%	49 / 600	Providing confidence and supply
2023	Devlet Bahçeli	5,484,820	10.07%	50 / 600	Providing confidence and supply

=== Senate elections ===
Senate of the Republic (1960–1980)
Election date	Party leader	Number of votes received	Percentage of votes	Number of senators
1973	Alparslan Türkeş	114,662	2.7%	0 / 52
1975	Alparslan Türkeş	170,357	3.2%	0 / 54
1977	Alparslan Türkeş	326,967	6.8%	0 / 50
1979	Alparslan Türkeş	312,241	6.6%	1 / 50

=== Local elections ===
Election date	Party leader	Provincial council votes	Percentage of votes	Number of municipalities	Map
1973	Alparslan Türkeş	124,367	1.25%	5 / 1,640	
1977	Alparslan Türkeş	820,212	6.66%	55 / 1,730	
1984	Party closed following the 1980 Turkish coup d'état and succeeded by the Nationalist Task Party (1985–93). MHP was re-established in 1993.				
1989	Party closed following the 1980 Turkish coup d'état and succeeded by the Nationalist Task Party (1985–93). MHP was re-established in 1993.				
1994	Alparslan Türkeş	2,248,013	7.97%	118 / 2,710	
1999	Devlet Bahçeli	5,397,033	17.15%	499 / 3,215	
2004	Devlet Bahçeli	3,372,249	10.45%	247 / 3,193	
2009	Devlet Bahçeli	6,386,279	15.97%	483 / 2,903	
2014	Devlet Bahçeli	7,907,067	17.62%	166 / 1,351	
2019	Devlet Bahçeli	3,756,245	8.12%	233 / 1,355	
2024	Devlet Bahçeli	3,016,739	6.59%	218 / 1,363	

== See also ==
- Idealism (Turkey)
- Nine Lights Doctrine
- Turkish Islamic synthesis
- Conservatism in Turkey
