= Unity Party (Turkey) =

Unity Party Türkiye Birlik Partisi
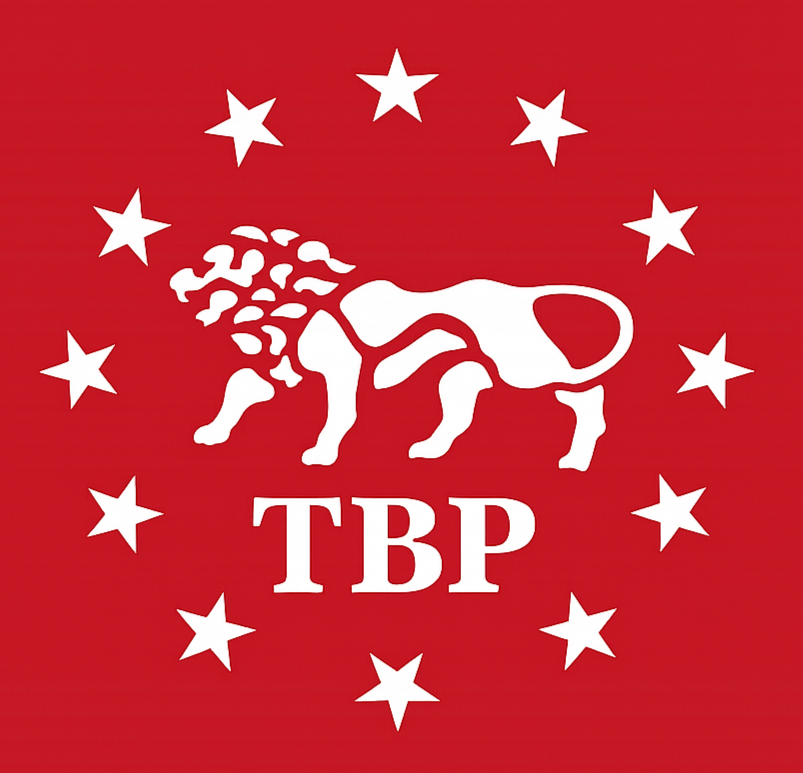
- President: Hüseyin Balan (1917-1984); 1966–1969; Mustafa Timisi (1936-); 1969–1980
- Secretary: Hüseyin Ekici
- Founder: Hasan Tahsin Berkman
- Founded: October 17, 1966
- Banned: September 12, 1980
- Succeeded by: Peace Party
- Ideology: Alevi nationalism (Civic nationalism/Left-wing nationalism/Stateless nationalism); Democratic socialism Ethical socialism Labourism; Laicism; Left-wing populism Liberal socialism Minority rights Progressivism; Secularism; Social democracy Social liberalism
- Political position: Left-wing to Centre-left
- International affiliation: Socialist International; Humanists International
- Colours: Pomegranate, red, and white

The Unity Party (Türkiye Birlik Partisi, TBP, until 1973 Birlik Partisi - BP) was a former Alevi political party that existed from 1966 until its closure in 1981 after the military coup of 1980. It had its roots among the Alevi population in modern-day Turkey. Hüseyin Balan was elected party president in 1966, and was succeeded in 1969 by Mustafa Timisi. Some of the main party leaders were members of an influential Alevi family of the Ulusoy.

It gained seats in the Turkish Parliament between 1966 and 1977. In the general elections of 1969, the party entered parliament with eight deputies of which five also supported the Government of Süleyman Demirel. In the general elections of 1973 the party only stemmed 1.1% of the voter share, gaining a single deputy in parliament, which was Mustafa Timisi. The party advocated for the recognition of the Alevis through the Directorate of Religious Affairs and demanded more religious freedom. It also worked closely together with Alevi organizations. It was more supportive towards Kemalism and did not gain so much support supposedly of the Kurdish Alevi. Its logo depicted a lion encircled by 12 stars representing Ali and the 12 twelve imams. Its successor was the Peace Party (Barış Partisi, BP) existed between 1996 and 1999 - a splinter party from the Republican People's Party (CHP).
