= 1977 Turkish general election =

← 1973	5 June 1977	1983 →

All 450 seats in the Grand National Assembly 226 seats needed for a majority
- Turnout: 72.42% (▲5.60pp)
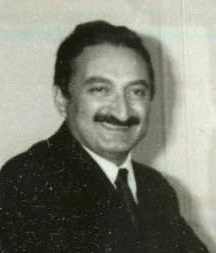

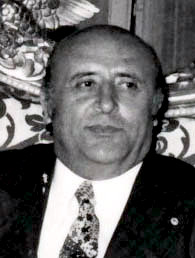

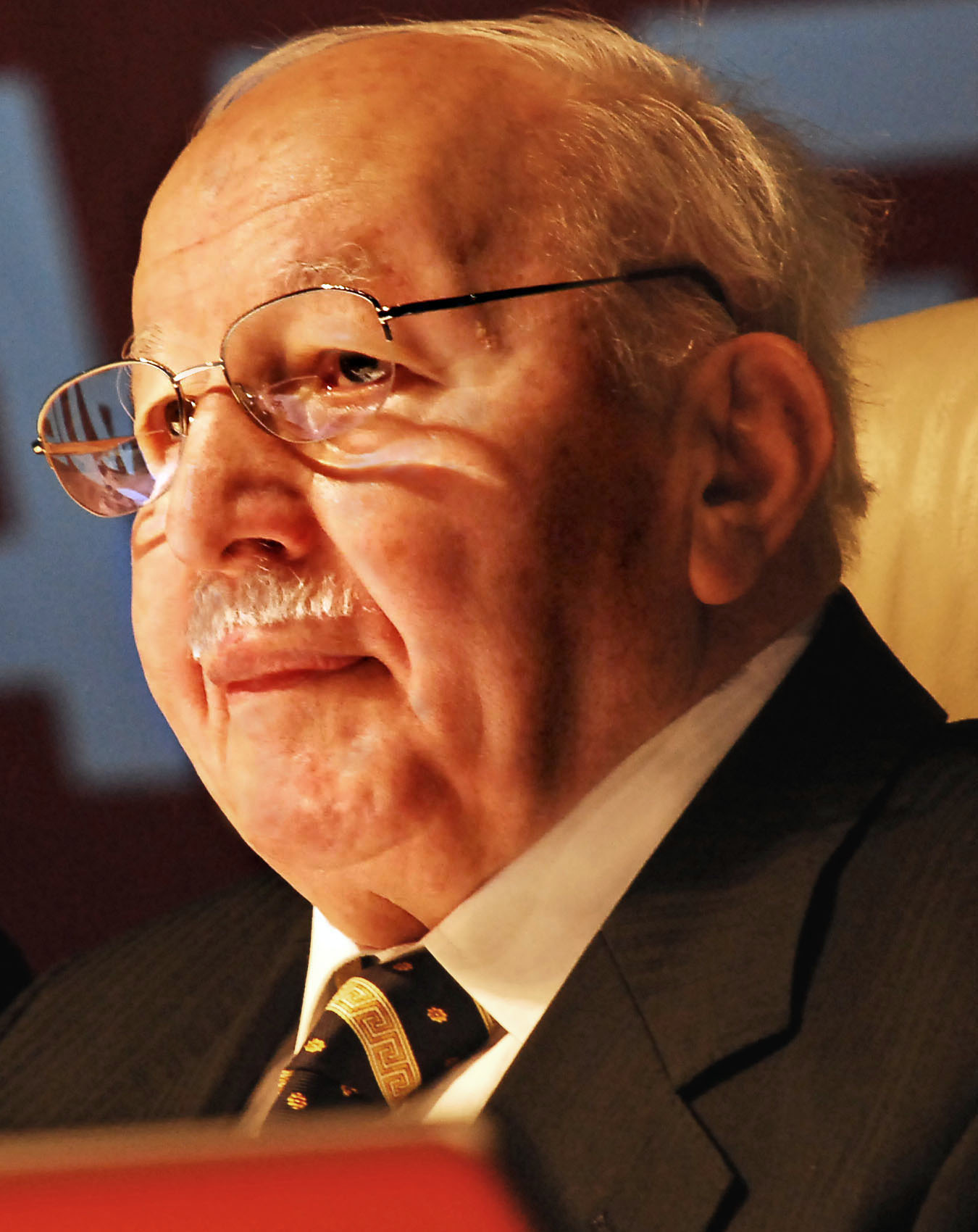
	First party	Second party
Leader	Bülent Ecevit	Süleyman Demirel
Party	CHP	AP
Last election	33.30%, 185 seats	29.82%, 149 seats
Seats won	213	189
Seat change	▲28	▲40
Popular vote	6,136,171	5,468,202
Percentage	41.38%	36.88%
Swing	▲8.08pp	▲7.06pp
	Third party	Fourth party
Leader	Necmettin Erbakan	Alparslan Türkeş
Party	MSP	MHP
Last election	11.80%, 48 seats	3.38%, 3 seats
Seats won	24	16
Seat change	▼24	▲13
Popular vote	1,269,918	951,544
Percentage	8.56%	6,42
Swing	▼3.24pp	▲3.04pp
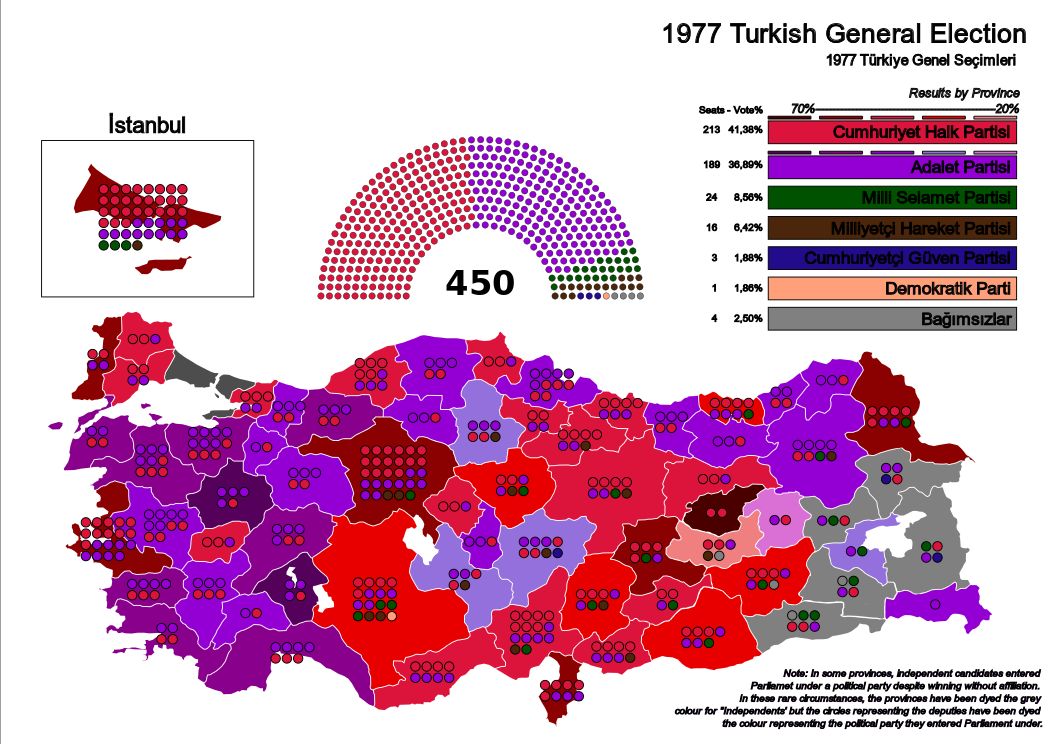
Prime Minister before election
Süleyman Demirel
AP
Elected Prime Minister
Bülent Ecevit
CHP

General elections were held in Turkey on 5 June 1977, on the same day as for the senate. Elections took place in the middle of a political race between the right-wing Justice Party (AP) and the left-wing Republican People's Party (CHP). With the charismatic leadership of Bülent Ecevit, the CHP managed to beat one of the symbolic figures of conservative politics in Turkey, Süleyman Demirel. Voter turnout was 72%.

The CHP's victory was the zenith of left-wing votes in the Turkish political history, but there were still no capable partners for the CHP to join forces to form government with since the remainder of parliament consisted of right-wing parties not eager to form a coalition led by Ecevit. Finally, the CHP could not gain a vote of confidence. They would need to wait until 1978 to gain support from some smaller parties and independents to govern. The CHP was not able to retain power for long and soon government control passed on to the Justice Party even as the rumblings of the 1980 military coup were beginning to be felt.

== Background ==
The 1974 Cyprus War had a significant impact on Turkish politics, including the rise of Bülent Ecevit and his political party, the Republican People's Party (CHP). Since Ecevit was the Prime Minister during the military intervention, his popularity increased significantly following the war which is one of the factors that led to CHP winning a larger percentage of the vote in the 1977 general election than in the previous election in 1973.

== Results ==
Party	Votes	%	Seats	+/–
Republican People's Party	6,136,171	41.38	213	+28
Justice Party	5,468,202	36.88	189	+40
National Salvation Party	1,269,918	8.56	24	–24
Nationalist Movement Party	951,544	6.42	16	+13
Republican Reliance Party	277,713	1.87	3	–10
Democratic Party	274,484	1.85	1	–44
Unity Party	58,540	0.39	0	–1
Workers' Party	20,565	0.14	0	0
Independents	370,035	2.50	4	–2
Total	14,827,172	100.00	450	0
Valid votes	14,827,172	96.54		
Invalid/blank votes	531,038	3.46		
Total votes	15,358,210	100.00		
Registered voters/turnout	21,207,303	72.42		
Source: Nohlen et al.
