= Sadi Irmak =

17th Prime Minister of the Republic of Turkey from 1974 to 1975

17th Prime Minister of Turkey
- In office 17 November 1974 – 31 March 1975
- President: Fahri Korutürk
- Preceded by: Bülent Ecevit
- Succeeded by: Süleyman Demirel

Speaker of the Parliament of Turkey
- In office 27 October 1981 – 4 December 1983
- President: Kenan Evren
- Preceded by: Cahit Karakaş
- Succeeded by: Necmettin Karaduman

Minister of Labor
- In office 9 March 1943 – 9 September 1947
- Prime Minister: Şükrü Saracoğlu; Recep Peker
- Succeeded by: Bekir Balta

Member of the Grand National Assembly
- In office 28 February 1943 – 14 May 1950
- Constituency: Konya (1943, 1946)

Personal details
- Born: 15 May 1904 Seydişehir, Ottoman Empire
- Died: 11 November 1990 (aged 86) Istanbul, Turkey
- Resting place: Aşiyan Asri Cemetery, Istanbul
- Party: Republican People's Party (CHP)
- Spouse: Ayşe Seniha Irmak
- Children: 2
- Education: Istanbul University; University of Berlin
- Occupation: Physician, politician

Mahmut Sadi Irmak (15 May 1904 – 11 November 1990) was a Turkish academic in physiology, politician and former Prime Minister of Turkey.

== Biography ==
He was born in the town Seydişehir of Konya, Ottoman Empire in 1904. He became teacher for biology after finishing the college in Konya. However, he quit his job the same year and attended the Law School at Istanbul University. Mustafa Kemal Atatürk wanted to send 50 of his students abroad for a good education in 1925. A test was held for this throughout Turkey. Sadi was among those who took the exam and was chosen. When Sadi got on the train, he refused to go. Just then, a telegram arrived. Sadi read Atatürk's words: I send you as a spark, you should return as a flame. That words affected Sadi. And he decided to go again. He went to Germany on a state granted scholarship to study biology and medicine. He graduated from the University of Berlin in 1929 with a degree in medicine. After completing his study, Sadi Irmak worked as an assistant physician in hospitals in Hagen and Düsseldorf, Germany. Irmak was fascinated by the Nazis and was a prominent proponent of eugenics.

Returned to Turkey, he worked as a government physician and teacher for biology. In 1932, he became a lecturer at the School of Medicine of Istanbul University, and in 1939, he was promoted to full professor for physiology.

== Political career ==
Sadi Irmak entered politics in 1943 as deputy of Konya. Between 7 June 1945, and 5 August 1946, he served as minister of labor in the cabinet of Şükrü Saracoğlu, becoming the first Turkish politician to assume the post. He returned to the faculty, however, in 1950, to lecture first in Munich, Germany and then in Istanbul again. In 1974, he was admitted to the Senate. The same year, Sadi Irmak was commissioned by President Fahri Korutürk to form the 38th government of Turkey on 17 November 1974. The caretaker government under his prime ministry lasted for 124 days until his resignation on 31 March 1975, when he lost a vote of no confidence in the parliament. After the military coup on 12 September 1980, he was elected to the Consultative Assembly. He acted as its speaker from 27 October 1981 until 4 December 1983.

Sadi Irmak died on 11 November 1990, in Istanbul, and was buried at the Aşiyan Asri Cemetery. He was survived by his wife and two children. His daughter, Prof. Yakut Irmak Özden, is director of the Institute for Atatürk's Ideology and History of His Reforms at Istanbul University.

== Notes ==
Political offices
Preceded by Bülent Ecevit	Prime Minister of Turkey; 17 Nov 1974 – 31 Mar 1975	Succeeded by Süleyman Demirel
Preceded by Cahit Karakaş	Speaker of the Parliament of Turkey; 27 Oct 1981 – 4 Dec 1983	Succeeded by Necmettin Karaduman
