= Republican Reliance Party =

Former political party in Turkey

Republican Reliance Party Cumhuriyetçi Güven Partisi
- Abbreviation: CGP
- Leader: Turhan Feyzioğlu
- Founded: 12 May 1967
- Dissolved: 16 October 1981
- Merger of: CP
- Split from: CHP
- Ideology: Kemalism

Republican Reliance Party (Turkish: Cumhuriyetçi Güven Partisi, CGP) was a former party in Turkey.

== Background ==
The Republican People's Party (CHP) which is usually credited as the founder of the Turkish Republic in 1923 was the oldest party in Turkey. The ideology of the party was Kemalism with strong emphasis on secularism. Bülent Ecevit, the secretary general of CHP after 1966 however, began introducing newer ideas. Although he didn't exclude Kemalism, he tried to transform the party into a social-democratic party avoiding using the word social-democrat. He announced that the party was situated at the left of center in political spectrum (Turkish: Ortanın Solu). But even this announcement caused a rift in the party.

== Political history ==
A group of the CHP MPs under the leadership of Turhan Feyzioğlu broke away from the CHP and founded the Reliance Party on 12 May 1967. Prominent names such as Nermin Neftçi, Coşkun Kırca, Orhan Öztrak, Ali İhsan Göğüş were among the other charter members. In 1969 elections the Reliance Party received 6,6% of votes and became the third party in the parliament. On 29 January 1971, the party was renamed as the National Reliance Party. In the same year the party participated in the Technocracy government and the next year Ferit Melen, a member of the party became the prime minister. On 4 May 1973, the Republican Party, another party also issued from the CHP, merged to the National Reliance Party. After merging, the party was renamed as the Republican Reliance Party.

== Later years ==
In 1973 elections, the Republican Reliance Party received 5,3% and participated in the coalition government of 1975 led by the Justice Party. The party further lost support in 1977 elections and after the coup d’état in 1980, like all other parties in the country, the party was banned by the military rule on 16 October 1981.
