= Democratic Party (Turkey, 1970) =

Former political party in Turkey

Democratic Party Demokratik Parti
- Chairperson: Ferruh Bozbeyli (1970-1978); Faruk Sükan (1978-1980)
- Founder: Ferruh Bozbeyli
- Founded: 18 December 1970
- Dissolved: 4 May 1980
- Split from: Justice Party
- Headquarters: Ankara
- Ideology: Liberal conservatism Conservative liberalism Economic liberalism Anti-corruption
- Political position: Centre-right

Democratic Party (Turkish: Demokratik Parti, DP for short) was a former political party in Turkey founded on 18 December 1970 . It should not be confused with the historical Democrat Party or the current Democrat Party in Turkey. The party advocated economic liberalism and individual rights with heavy emphasis on the rule of law. Although liberal on economic and social issues, the party, especially Ferruh Bozbeyli, strongly emphasized that one must strive to uphold their national and cultural identity.

== Background ==
The historical Democrat Party which was the ruling party between 1950 and 1960 was closed by the military rule. In 1961 and 1965 elections most of ex Democrat Party adherents supported Justice Party, a party founded in 1961. After the 1965 elections, the Justice Party came to power. Following the 1969, however, elections in which Justice Party was again successful, tension between the liberal, conservative and Islamist wings of the party became evident. The liberal wing which had the support of former Democrat Party leaders (such as Celal Bayar, third president of Turkey), broke away from the Justice Party and founded the new Democratic Party, accusing them of condoning the rise of extremist movements. The Islamists had also left the party, founding the National Order Party.

== History ==
DP was founded on 18 December 1970. The former parliament speaker Ferruh Bozbeyli was the chairman. Saadettin Bilgiç as well as the relatives of the former Democrat Party members were among the other important MPs. The main competitors of the party were Justice Party and National Salvation Party (or its predecessor National Order Party). In the 1973 elections, the Democratic Party received 11.9% of votes and sent 45 representatives to the lower house of the parliament. (It was the third party in terms of the vote percentage and fourth party in terms of the number of representatives.) Republican People's Party (CHP) was the winner. But CHP needed coalition partners to form the government. DP refused to form the coalition with CHP. Later in 1975 DP refused to participate in another coalition government led by Justice Party (4th government of Süleyman Demirel) . However, after this last decision, the big names in the party returned to Justice Party on 9 March 1975. In the 1977 election, the Democratic Party received only 1.1% of votes. On 4 May 1980, the party dissolved itself.

== See also ==
- Democrat Party (Turkey, historical)
- Democrat Party (Turkey, current)
