= Ministry of Local Government =

Ministry of Local Government may refer to:

- Ministry of Local Government (Rwanda)
- Ministry of Local Governments (Turkey)
- Ministry of Local Government (Uganda)
- Ministry of Local Government (Zambia)

== See also ==
- Ministry of Local Government and Rural Development (disambiguation)
