= Ministries of Turkey =

The ministries of Turkey are the most influential part of the executive branch of the Turkish government. Each ministry is headed by a minister appointed by the President. Currently there are 17 ministries.

== List of ministries ==
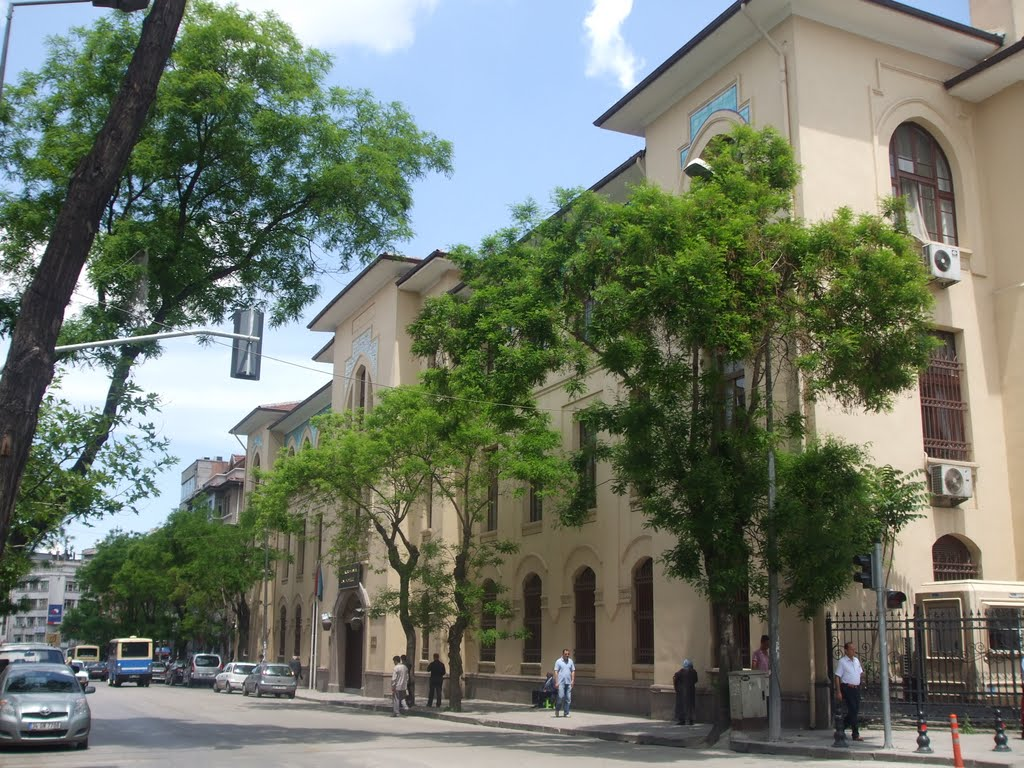
The building of the Ministry of Culture and Tourism in Ankara

Logo	Ministry	Abbreviation	Year	Website
	Ministry of Agriculture and Forestry; Tarım ve Orman Bakanlığı	TOB	1924	Ministry of Agriculture and Forestry
	Ministry of Culture and Tourism; Kültür ve Turizm Bakanlığı	KTB	1957	Ministry of Culture and Tourism
	Ministry of Energy and Natural Resources; Enerji ve Tabii Kaynaklar Bakanlığı	ETKB	1963	Ministry of Energy and Natural Resources
	Ministry of Environment, Urbanisation and Climate Change; Çevre, Şehircilik ve İklim Değişikliği Bakanlığı	ÇŞİDB	1920	Ministry of Environment, Urbanisation and Climate Change
	Ministry of Family and Social Services; Aile ve Sosyal Hizmetler Bakanlığı	ASHB	2011	Ministry of Family and Social Services
	Ministry of Foreign Affairs; Dışişleri Bakanlığı	DB	1920	Ministry of Foreign Affairs
	Ministry of Health; Sağlık Bakanlığı	SB	1920	Ministry of Health
	Ministry of Industry and Technology; Sanayi ve Teknoloji Bakanlığı	STB	1949	Ministry of Industry and Technology
	Ministry of the Interior; İçişleri Bakanlığı	İB	1920	Ministry of the Interior
	Ministry of Justice; Adalet Bakanlığı	ADB	1923	Ministry of Justice
	Ministry of Labour and Social Security; Çalışma ve Sosyal Güvenlik Bakanlığı	ÇSGB	1945	Ministry of Labour and Social Security
	Ministry of National Defense; Millî Savunma Bakanlığı	MSB	1920	Ministry of National Defense
	Ministry of National Education; Millî Eğitim Bakanlığı	MEB	1920	Ministry of National Education
	Ministry of Trade; Ticaret Bakanlığı	TB	1939	Ministry of Trade
	Ministry of Transport and Infrastructure; Ulaştırma ve Altyapı Bakanlığı	UAB	1939	Ministry of Transport and Infrastructure
	Ministry of Treasury and Finance; Hazine ve Maliye Bakanlığı	HMB	1923	Ministry of Treasury and Finance
	Ministry of Youth and Sports; Gençlik ve Spor Bakanlığı	GSB	1969	Ministry of Youth and Sports

== History ==
1920s	1930s	1940s	1950s	1960s	1970s	1980s		1990s	2000s	2010s		2020s
Foreign Affairs (1920–)
Health (1920–)
Interior (1920–)
National Defense (1920–)
Justice (1923–)
National Education (1923–1983)						National Education, Youth and Sports (1983–1989)		National Education (1989–)				
N/A				Youth and Sports (1969–1983)		National Education, Youth and Sports (1983–1989)		Minister of State (Responsible for Youth and Sports) (1989–2011)		Youth and Sports (2011–)		
N/A			Press-Publication and Tourism (1957–1963)	Tourism and Publicity (1963–1981)		Culture and Tourism (1981–1989)		Tourism (1989–2003)	Culture and Tourism (2003–)			
N/A			Press-Publication and Tourism (1957–1963)	Tourism and Publicity (1963–1981)	Culture (1971–1981)	Culture and Tourism (1981–1989)		Culture (1989–2003)	Culture and Tourism (2003–)			
N/A				Energy and Natural Resources (1963–)								
Public Works (1920–1983)						Public Works and Housing (1983–2011)				Environment and Urban Planning (2011–2021)		Environment, Urbanisation and Climate Change (2021–)
N/A			Development and Housing (1958–1983)			Public Works and Housing (1983–2011)				Environment and Urban Planning (2011–2021)		Environment, Urbanisation and Climate Change (2021–)
N/A								Environment (1991–2003)	Environment and Forest (2003–2011)	Forest and Water Management (2011–2018)	Agriculture and Forestry (2018–)	
N/A				Forestry (1960–1980)		Agriculture and Forestry (1980–1983)	Agriculture, Forestry and Rural Affairs (1983–1991)	Forestry (1991–2003)	Environment and Forest (2003–2011)	Forest and Water Management (2011–2018)	Agriculture and Forestry (2018–)	
Agriculture (1923–1974)					Food, Agriculture and Livestock (1974–1980)	Agriculture and Forestry (1980–1983)	Agriculture, Forestry and Rural Affairs (1983–1991)	Agriculture and Rural Affairs (1991–2011)		Food, Agriculture and Livestock (2011–2018)	Agriculture and Forestry (2018–)	
				Rural Affairs (1963–1974)	Rural Affairs and Cooperatives (1974–1983)		Agriculture, Forestry and Rural Affairs (1983–1991)	Agriculture and Rural Affairs (1991–2011)		Food, Agriculture and Livestock (2011–2018)	Agriculture and Forestry (2018–)	
Finance (1923–1983)						Finance and Customs (1983–1993)		Finance (1993–2018)			Treasury and Finance (2018–)	
N/A	Customs and Monopoly (1931–1983)					Finance and Customs (1983–1993)		Minister of State (Responsible for Customs) (1993–2011)		Customs and Trade (2011–2018)	Trade (2018–)	
Trade (1924–1928)	Trade (1939–1949)	Economy and Trade (1949–1960)		Trade (1960–1971)	External Economic Affairs (1971)	Trade (1971–1983)	Industry and Trade (1983–2011)			Economy (2011–2018)	Trade (2018–)	
N/A		Industry (1949–1971)			Industry and Technology (1971–1983)		Industry and Trade (1983–2011)			Science, Industry and Technology (2011–2018)	Industry and Technology (2018–-)	
N/A		Labour (1946–1983)					Labour and Social Security (1983–2018)				Family, Labour and Social Services (2018–2021)	Labour and Social Security (2021–)
N/A					Social Security (1974–1983)		Labour and Social Security (1983–2018)				Family, Labour and Social Services (2018–2021)	Labour and Social Security (2021–)
N/A								Minister of State (Responsible for Women and Family Affairs) (1991–2011)		Family and Social Policy (2011–2018)	Family, Labour and Social Services (2018–2021)	Family and Social Services (2021–)
N/A	Transport (1939–2011)									Transport, Maritime and Communication (2011–2018)	Transport and Infrastructure (2018–)	

== Former ministries ==
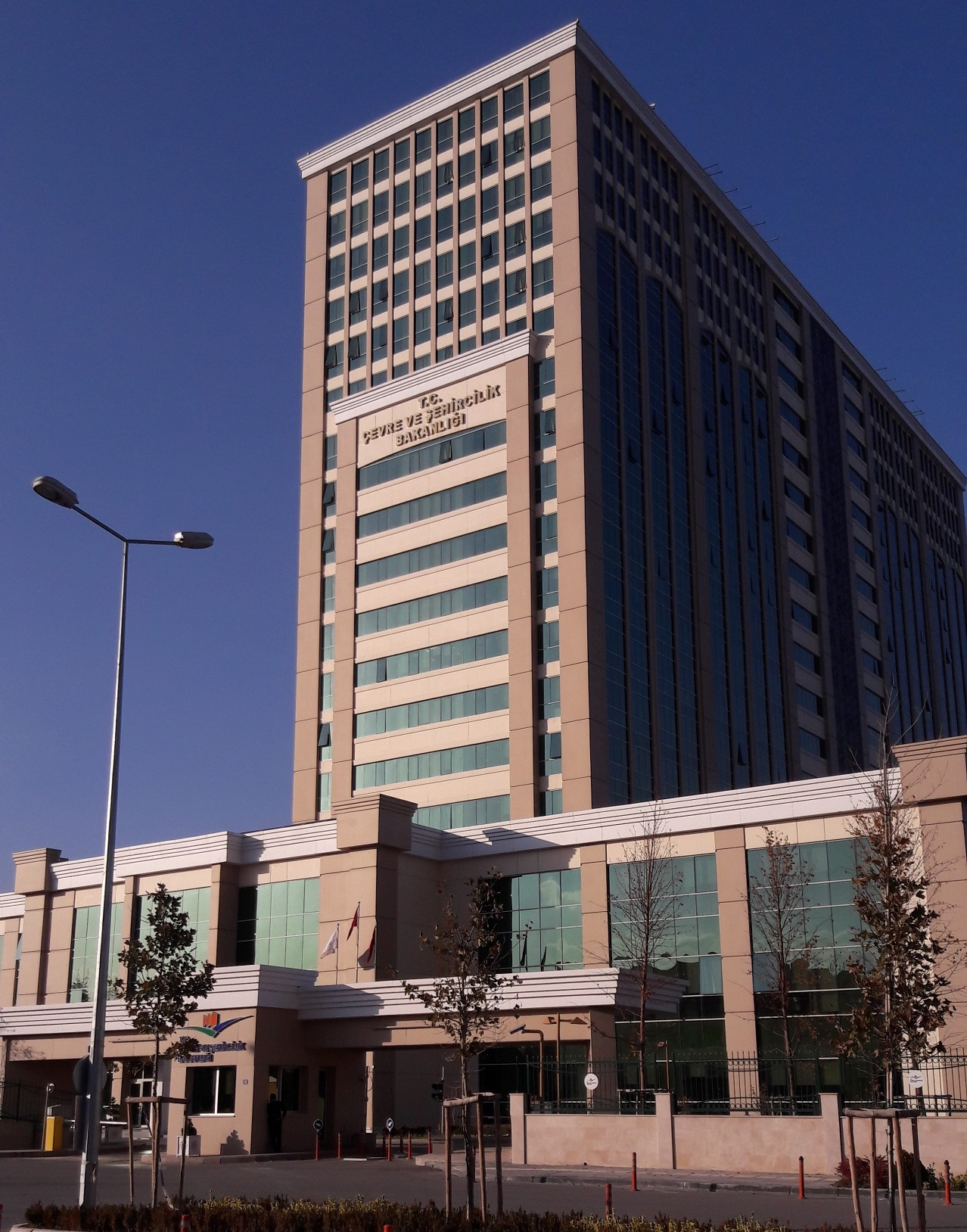
The current building of the Ministry of Environment and Urban Planning in Ankara.

- Ministry of General Staff (1923–24): Became General Staff of the Republic of Turkey
- Ministry of Sharia and the Foundations (1923–1924): Became Presidency of Religious Affairs
- Ministry of Construction and Settlement (1923–1925)
- Ministry of Navy (1924–1927): Merged with Ministry of National Defence
- Ministry of Enterprises (1978–1979)
- Ministry of Coordination (1957–1960)
- Ministry of Local Governments (1978–1979)
- Ministry of European Union Affairs (2011–2018)
- Ministry of Development (2011–2018)
- Ministry of Economy (2011–2018): Merged with Ministry of Trade

== List of ministers ==
- List of ministers of finance of Turkey
- List of ministers of foreign affairs of Turkey
- List of ministers of culture and tourism of Turkey
- List of ministers of national defense of Turkey
- List of ministers of national education of Turkey
- List of ministers of the interior of Turkey
- List of ministers of justice of Turkey
- List of ministers of transport and infrastructure of Turkey

Former:

- List of prime ministers of Turkey
- List of deputy prime ministers of Turkey

== See also ==
- Government of Turkey
- Cabinet of Turkey (list)
- Ministries of the Ottoman Empire
