= Justine Nameere =

Ugandan lawyer, presenter and politician

Minister of State for Local Government
- Incumbent
- Assumed office May 2026
- Appointed by: Yoweri Museveni
- Preceded by: Victoria Rusoke Businge

Woman Member of Parliament, Masaka City
- In office 2026-2031

Personal details
- Born: April 17, 1990 (age 36) Masaka
- Citizenship: Uganda
- Party: National Resistance Movement
- Spouse: Kennedy Nsubuga
- Parents: Vincent Ssempijja (father); Jennifer Birabwa (mother)
- Education: Makerere University (BA.Laws)
- Alma mater: Makerere University, Kampala International University, Makerere University Business School
- Occupation: Television presenter, lawyer, politician

Justine Nameere (born 17 April 1990) is a Ugandan television host, lawyer, and politician who serves as the Minister of State for Local Government in the Uganda Cabinet. She was appointed to that position on 26 May 2026, replacing Victoria Rusoke Businge.She is the elected woman member of parliament for Masaka City under the National Resistance Movement.

== Early life and education ==
Nameere, who hails from Masaka, is the daughter of former minister of Defence and Veteran affairs Vincent Ssempijja, born on 17 April 1990. Her mother Jennifer Birabwa died when Nameere was 12 years old.

She completed her primary education at Namugongo Boarding and continued to King's College Budo, where she was a member of the drama club and school band. She graduated with a first-class honours in a diploma in law from the Law Development Centre. She has a certificate in Business Administration from Makerere University Business School, and a certificate in Counselling and guidance from Kampala International University. She also undertook a bachelor's degree in Law from Makerere University.

== Career ==
Nameere began her media career at NTV Uganda, hosting the show Life Stories, which premiered on March 26, 2012. The programme, featuring interviews with individuals sharing unique and emotional experiences, won Television Programme of the Year at the 2012 Edutainment Africa Awards. She later moved to Urban TV, where she presented the Sunday evening show Life and People. Less than a year later, Nameere transitioned to Bukedde TV, a Luganda-language station, co-hosting the program Minibuzz with Dickson Zzizinga for about three months. She resigned because she was pregnant and her health was not good. In 2018, she joined Salt TV as host of Omunnyo Ku Makya, but was suspended within a month for alleged indiscipline towards her employers.

She started an NGO in 2012, called Voice of the Pearl Foundation, which attended to people with severe health problems. She worked as a court clerk at Lukaya Magistrate Court in Masaka in 2011. She was a radio presenter with Best FM in Masaka, hosting the youth show on positive living in 2009.

She entered politics in 2015, taking part in the National Resistance Movement (NRM) primaries and winning the position of vice chairperson of the NRM Youth League in Kalungu District. She announced her intention to run for Youth Member of Parliament for the Central Region for the 2016–2021 term, but withdrew from the race for undisclosed reasons. Subsequently, she contested the MP seat for Bukoto East constituency but was defeated by Florence Namayanja.

In the 2026 general elections, Nameere was declared the Masaka City Woman MP-elect after a contentious vote recount presided over by Chief Magistrate Abert Asiimwe, which overturned the earlier declaration of Rose Nalubowa of the opposition National Unity Platform as the winner by the electoral commission.

== Arrest and detention ==
In May 2026, shortly after being sworn in as the Woman Member of Parliament for Masaka City, Nameere was arrested by security personnel amid tensions surrounding the anticipated election of the Speaker of the 12th Parliament of Uganda and reported disagreements linked to political support for Anita Among Uganda's former speaker of Parliament.

According to media reports, security operatives also conducted searches at her residence as part of investigations into alleged political mobilization activities related to the parliamentary speakership race. She was later released and subsequently publicly distanced herself from efforts associated with Anita Among’s reported speakership campaign.

== Court case ==
In September 2026, Nameere was dragged to court by her Masaka Woman MP opponent Rose Nalubowa over the January 2026 elections.

== Personal life ==
Nameere is inspired by Rebecca Kadaga and Christiane Amanpour of CNN. She likes documentaries and emotional television shows.

== See also ==
Joan Namutaawe

Balam Barugahara
