= Sazak =

Sazak may refer to:

== People ==
- Sazak (surname), list of people with the surname

== Places ==
- Sazak, Beyağaç
- Sazak, Çal
- Sazak, Çorum
- Sazak, Ilgaz
- Sazak, Kızılcahamam, a village in Kızılcahamam district of Ankara Province, Turkey
- Sazak, Mihalıççık, a village in Mihalıççık district of Eskişehir Province, Turkey
- Sazak, Sarayköy
- Sazak, Yeşilova
- Sazak, Yenice

== Others ==
- Sazak assault, an ambush carried out in 1997 on soldiers, in the Sazak neighbourhood of Reşadiye district of Tokat Province, Turkey
