= Benjamin Kumumanya =

Permanent Secretary of the Ministry of Local Government
- Incumbent
- Assumed office 2016
- President: Yoweri Museveni

Personal details
- Citizenship: Ugandan
- Education: Makerere University
- Occupation: Civil servant
- Profession: Public administrator

Benjamin Kumumanya also known as Ben Kumumanya is a Ugandan civil servant and public administrator who serves as the Permanent Secretary of the Ministry of Local Government.

== Education background ==
Kumumanya holds a Bachelor of Arts degree in Political Science and public administration from Makerere University in Kampala and a Master of Arts degree in Development Studies. He also has a Postgraduate Diploma in Governance, Democratization and Public Policy.

== Career ==
Kumumanya began his career in 1997 while serving as a Senior Assistant Secretary, Local Councils Development Department, Ministry of Local Government. From 1999 to 2008, he served as the Principal Assistant Secretary, District and Urban Administration Department, Ministry of Local Government.

In 2008, he served as the Assistant Commissioner, District Administration, Ministry of Local Government and from 2009 to 2016, he served as the Undersecretary at the Office of the Prime Minister and Ministry of Foreign Affairs before he was appointed as the Permanent Secretary, Ministry of Local Government in 2016.

== See also ==
- Joseph Musanyufu
- Diana Atwine
- Aminah Zawedde
- Benon Mutambi
