= Gün Sazak =

Turkish politician

Ministry of Customs and Monopolies
- In office 21 July 1977 – 5 January 1978
- Prime Minister: Süleyman Demirel
- Preceded by: Mehmet Can
- Succeeded by: Tuncay Mataracı

Personal details
- Born: 26 March 1932 Ankara, Turkey
- Died: 27 May 1980 (aged 48) Ankara, Turkey
- Party: Nationalist Movement Party (MHP)
- Spouse: Nilgün Sazak
- Children: 4, including Süleyman Servet
- Education: California State Polytechnic University College of Agriculture
- Occupation: Politician
- Profession: Agronomist
- Cabinet: 41st government of Turkey

Gün Sazak (26 March 1932 – 27 May 1980) was a Turkish nationalist politician and former government minister of the Nationalist Movement Party (MHP). He was assassinated by the Revolutionary People's Liberation Party/Front after his police guard was removed. After his killing, MHP supporters carried out the Çorum massacre in reprisal.

== Early life and family ==
Gün Sazak was born on 26 March 1932 in Ankara to Emin Sazak and his wife Ayşe. His father was a member of parliament from the Republican People's Party (CHP) and later the Democrat Party (DP). His brother Güven Sazak served as the president of Süper Lig club Fenerbahçe SK, and Yılmaz Sazak, was the president of the Turkish Athletic Federation.

Sazak completed his primary and secondary education in Ankara. His family had extensive agricultural land at Sazak village in the Mihalıççık district of Eskişehir Province. Because of this land Sazak went in 1951 to the United States to study at the California State Polytechnic University College of Agriculture.

After eight years, he returned home, and worked on a construction business and the family farm. Sazak achieved a significant increase in agricultural production by applying modern techniques.

He was married to Nilgün and they had a son named Süleyman Servet Sazak in 1955. He later became a member of parliament from Eskişehir. The Sazaks also had two daughters, Mahmure Gülgün Sazak, and Ayşe Bilgün Sazak. Ayşe Bilgün married textile businessman Cem Boyner.

== Politician career ==
In 1971, Gün Sazak entered politics representing the Nationalist Movement Party (MHP). Sazak was elected to the post deputy chairman of the MHP in 1972 following a traffic accident which killed the previous holder of the post.

At the 1977 general election, Sazak unsuccessfully ran for an Eskişehir Province seat in the parliament, representing the MHP.

During the formation of the 41st government (the so-called Second Nationalist Front coalition cabinet) of Süleyman Demirel, Sazak was appointed Minister of Customs and Monopolies despite not being member of the parliament. He served as government minister 21 July 1977 until 5 January 1978. During his term he successfully fought corruption, smuggling and customs fraud. Sazak reduced arms trafficking conducted by organized crime and terrorism and imported cigarette smuggling. Customs corruption was said to be restored after he left the post. Abdi İpekçi (1929–1979), the later-assassinated editor-in-chief of the daily Milliyet, who opposed Sazak's politically, had praised Sazak in a column on 12 October 1978 for his achievement in re-establishing law and order at the customs. Another political opponent CHP stated during the 1978 budget debates that Sazak is the only person, who had stopped the "robbery" at the customs since the foundation of the Republic.

Gün Sazak was also the chairman of the executive board at the daily Hergün.

== Assassination ==
Gün Sazak's official police guard was removed by an order of the martial law commander in Ankara. This was despite the risk to Sazak during a period of political unrest.

On 27 May 1980, Gün Sazak was assassinated in front of his house by members of the Marxist–Leninist terrorist group Revolutionary Left (Turkish: Devrimci Sol), shortly Dev Sol. The terrorists, who were later identified as Mehmet Edip Eranıl, Ahmet Levent Babacan, Sadık Zafer Özcan and Cengiz Gül arrived at Sazak's house around 19:00 hours and they then waited for Sazak's arrival. Gül shot and severely wounded Gün Sazak in his back as he arrived home around midnight. Sazak had got out of his car and he was trying to take his belongings out of the car's boot. Sazak died on his way to the hospital. It was later said that a passing minibus had hindered Babacan's shooting. The perpetrators left on foot and later caught a taxi.

== Aftermath ==
After the assassination, Gül and Babacan delivered their handguns to 17-year-old Cem Öz, another member of Dev Sol. Instructed by Gül, Özcan phoned the newspapers Milliyet and Tercüman and gave notice of Dev Sol's responsibility for the assassination.

Two days after the assassination, MHP supporters were said to have spread propaganda about Sazak's death. Alevis in Çorum were attacked and there was a call to attack both Alevis and any left wing activists. The military restored order after 48 people were said to have died and numerous people had their faces mutilated.

In July 1980, Dev Sol claimed responsibility for the assassination in its illegal journal Devrimci Sol. The capture of the assailants took time. The fugitives Eranıl, who was the organization's Ankara office chief, Cemal Kemal Altun, a co-planner of the assassination, and Gül fled abroad after the military coup on 12 September 1980. Gül crossed the border to Greece first, and then went to Frankfurt, Germany. Sadık Zafer Özcan was apprehended on 2 March, Ahmet Levent Babacan on 7 March and Cem Öz on 15 March 1981.

Ten months after the assassination, Babacan, Özcan and Öz, were apprehended. On 6 April 1983, the 2nd Military Court of the Martial Law Command in Ankara sentenced Babacan to life imprisonment, Öz to five years aggravated imprisonment, and Özcan to six years aggravated imprisonment. Eranıl, who was considered the mastermind behind the assassination hijacked a plane with three other accomplices. The Turkish Airlines airplane was on a domestic flight from Istanbul to Ankara and it was commanded to go to Burgas in Bulgaria on 24 May 1981. The hijackers asked for the release of nearly 50 prisoners in Turkey and half a million dollars. They were overpowered by their hostages and were arrested by the Bulgarian police. However, it was not revealed whether Eranıl was extradited to Turkey or not.

Eranıl was reported to be running a café in Duisburg, Germany in 2008. Altun was arrested in Germany on 5 July 1982 in connection with the assassination of former Turkish prime minister Nihat Erim. However Altun committed suicide by jumping from the sixth floor of the courthouse in West Berlin, Germany on 30 August 1983 to prevent his extradition to Turkey.

In January 2013, a report of the National Intelligence Organization of Turkey (MİT) revealed that the assassination of Gün Sazak was instructed by Dursun Karataş (1952–2008), the leader of Dev Sol.

== Legacy ==
A boulevard in Karşıyaka district of İzmir and streets in Uşak and in Keçiören, Ankara are named after him. A secondary boarding school in his family's hometown in Mihaliççık, Eskişehir bears his name.
