= Balaam Barugahara =

Ugandan politician (born 1979)

DR Balaam Barugahara Ateenyi
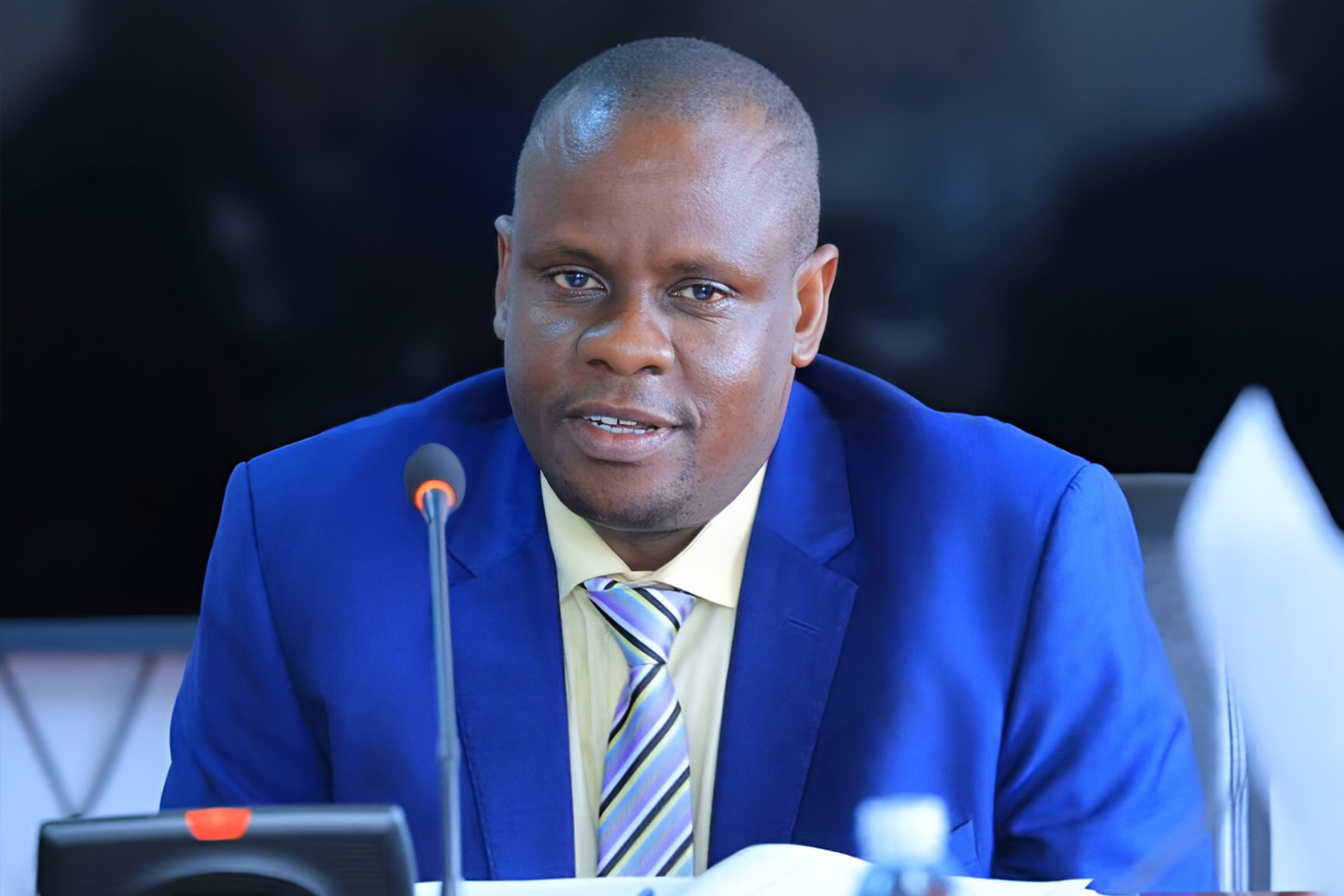

Minister of Local Government
- Incumbent
- Assumed office 26 May 2026
- President: Yoweri Museveni
- Preceded by: Raphael Magyezi

State minister for gender, labour and social development
- In office 21 March 2024 – 25 May 2026
- Preceded by: Sarah Mateke Nyirabashitsi
- Succeeded by: Lakisa Mercy Faith

Personal details
- Born: 28 July 1979 (age 47) Mbarara Hospital, Mbarara, Uganda
- Citizenship: Uganda
- Party: National Resistance Movement
- Other political affiliations: Patriotic League of Uganda
- Children: Benta karuhanga Abwooli; Bevan Brennan Kamukama Akiiki; Biden Kamusiime Amooti
- Education: A-Level Original Progressive SS Bweyogerere; Makerere University, (Bachelor of Commerce); Cavendish University Uganda,Master of Business Administration)
- Occupation: Politician, Investor, Events Organiser Farmer & Rancher
- Known for: Politics; Minister of State for Youths and Children Affairs

Balaam Barugahara Ateenyi commonly known as Balaam (born 28 July 1979) is a Ugandan politician, business man, music and events promoter. He serves as the Minister of Local Government in the cabinet of Uganda .He was appointed by President Yoweri Museveni on 26 May 2026 replacing Raphael Magyezi.

He previously served as the minister of state for gender, labour, and social development in charge of children and youth affairs from March 2024 to May 2026.

Balaam is also the CEO of Balaam group of companies, a conglomerate operating in Uganda and South Sudan and his investments are mainly in the areas of entertainments, broadcasting, real estate, manufacturing, hotels, and resorts.

== Early life and education ==
Balaam Barugahara Ateenyi was born on 28 July 1979 to late Engineer David Balaam Byenkya Akiiki of Kijura, Masindi District and Gladesi Byenkya Abwooli of Kalisizo in Central Buganda. His father, Davidson Balaam Byenkya Akiiki, died in 1991 when he was still a young boy.

=== Education ===
He attended Namasagali School, St. John Bosco Senior Secondary School & Original Progressive Senior Secondary School for A'level. He then enrolled at Makerere University for Bachelor of Commerce where he majored in marketing, after, he did a Master of Business Administration (Marketing Option) at Cavendish University Uganda.

== Business career ==
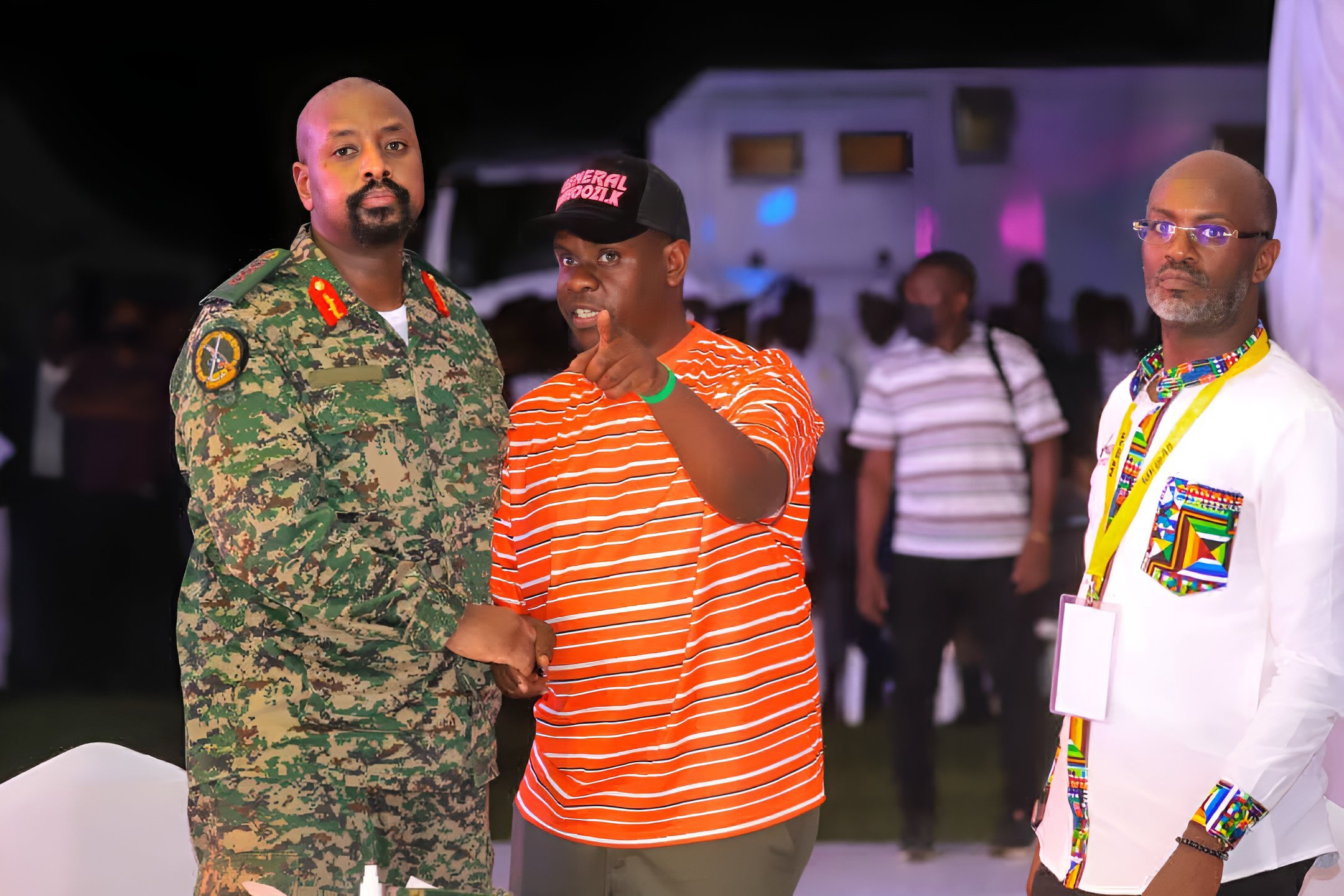
Balaam with his PLU chairman & CDF Gen Muhoozi Kainerugaba

Balaam is the proprietor and owner of: Original Best Water company based in South Sudan, Radio One in South Sudan, the first privately owned media house he started in 2009. He is also the proprietor and Media group owner of Radio4 (Uganda), Radio1 (South Sudan), Radio 7 (Masindi), Radio8 (Masaka) and Radio3 and Radio 9 (Elgon region) and a leading distributor of MTN products in Uganda.

Balaam is a real estate developer with hotels in Kampala and South Sudan, including a 5 star hotel in Masindi, which was commissioned by President Yoweri Museveni in September 2022.

== Political career ==
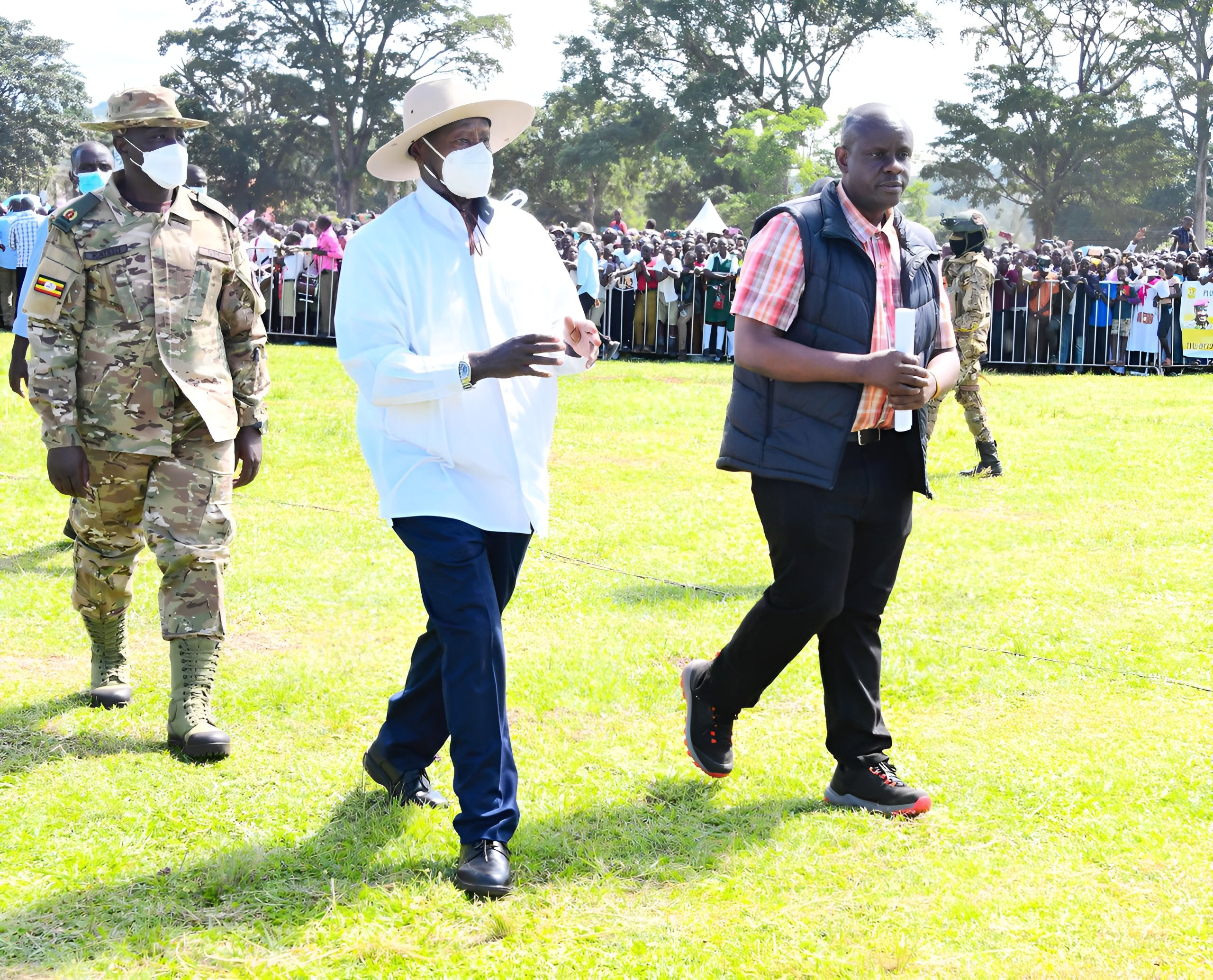
President Museveni Yoweri kaguta visits Balaam's home town for a rally in Masindi

On 21 March 2024, he was appointed by Yoweri Museveni as a state minister for gender, labor and social development in charge of children and youth affairs.

== Personal life ==
He is the fifth child of 14. Balaam is father to three: Benta Karuhanga Abwooli, Bevan Brennan Kamukama Akiiki and Biden Kamusiime Amooti. His first son died of cancer in 2013.

== Awards and honors ==
- In November 2026, Barugahara was named second runner-up for the Best Performing Minister in Africa at the Unstoppable African Awards held in Nairobi, Kenya.
- On 21 February 2023, Balaam was awarded an honorary doctorate in humanity from Zoe Life Theological College, United States for changing and impacting the lives of Ugandans.

== See also ==
- Yoweri Museveni
- Justine Nameere
