= BBC Goal of the Month =

English football award

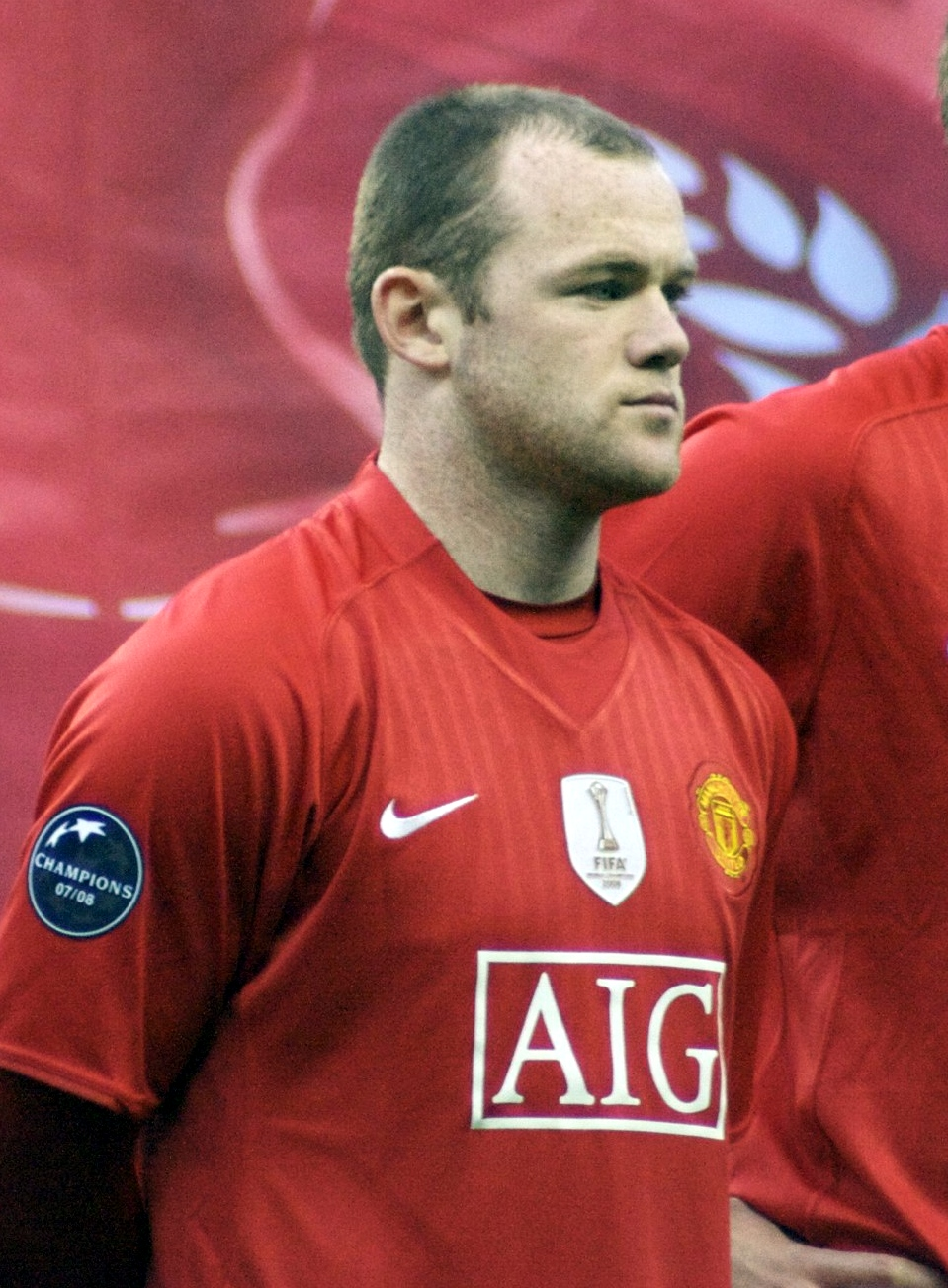
Wayne Rooney won the honour a record eight times.

The Goal of the Month is a monthly segment on BBC's Match of the Day television programme, in honour of the best goal scored each month. The segment has been featured on the programme since the 1970–71 season. Typically, a selection of eight or ten goals from the month are shown before the Goal of the Month is decided. Until the 2006–07 season, viewers were given the chance to win a prize by selecting the correct winner and the winner would be decided by a vote firstly by post then by text and phone votes. For the majority of the 2007–08 season, the BBC did not allow any competitions due to a money-for-competitions-entry scandal, but towards the end of the season and for the goal of the season competition, normal service was resumed. When Match of the Day moved to Match of the Day 2 when Colin Murray presented the winner was decided by the subjective opinion of one of the pundits, such as Alan Hansen, Mark Lawrenson or Alan Shearer. From October 2013, BBC Match of the Day 2 viewers have picked the Goal of the Month in a poll conducted by voting on the BBC Sport website or sending the hashtag of the viewers favourite goal via Twitter.

The award of Goal of the Month was usually given as first-, second- and third-best goal of the month on Match of the Day up until the BBC lost the right to show Premier League highlights from 2000 to 2001. When highlights returned to the BBC for 2004–05, the format was reduced to only the best goal of the month being announced. Contending goals used to feature from other competitions which the BBC had the broadcasting rights for, most usually from the FA Cup, this was up to 2007–08 when its rights were transferred to ITV. Once the FA Cup returned to the BBC from 2014 to 2015, Goal of the Month remained exclusively a Premier League affair. The winners usually go forth to contest the Goal of the Season.

From the 2016–17 season, the Premier League has run its own Goal of the Month award, whose winners can conflict with the Match of the Day accolade, as had happened six times in its maiden season.

== Records ==
- During the period in which a top three was announced each month, Dennis Bergkamp was the only player to have achieved the deemed first, second, and third best goals of the month in one calendar month, August 1997. Only two goals came from his hat-trick against Leicester City — not all three as is widely cited. The third was from a previous game against Southampton.
- The record for the number of players having more than one nomination for GOTS in a season is three. This has happened twice, the first time in 1992–93 when Ryan Giggs (September and May), Dalian Atkinson (October and December) and Dwight Yorke (February and March) each won two Goal of The Month awards. The second was in 1995–96 with Tony Yeboah (August and September); Ian Wright (October and January) and Alan Shearer (December and April) each having two goals in contention.
- There have been numerous occasions where two players have been nominated twice, but as of 2019–20, no player has yet had three goals selected in a Premier League season.
- Kevin De Bruyne is the last player to have had two goals selected, in the 2019–20 season.
- Consecutive GOTM wins has occurred only three times. The players to have achieved this are: Yorke in 1992–93 (February and March); Yeboah in 1995–96 (August and September) and Gareth Bale in 2012–13 (January and February).
- May 1995 is the only instance, where Goal of the Month was awarded to foreign team's player, namely Nayim of Real Zaragoza for his goal against Arsenal in UEFA Cup Winners' Cup final.
- Since the advent of the Premier League in 1992–93, Jack Wilshere is the only player to have won GOTS in consecutive seasons (2013–14 and 2014–15), although his latter win was controversial.
- Wayne Rooney is the player with the most GOTS wins in the Premier League era, having won the award three times: 2004–05, 2006–07 and 2010–11.

== Winners ==
=== 1992–93 ===
Key: Goal of the Season

Month	Scorer	For	Against	Stadium	Competition	Date
September	(Wales) Ryan Giggs	Manchester United	Tottenham Hotspur	White Hart Lane	Premiership	19 September 1992
October	(England) Dalian Atkinson	Aston Villa	Wimbledon	Selhurst Park	Premiership	3 October 1992
November	(England) Clive Freeman	Altrincham	Chester City	Moss Lane	FA Cup	25 November 1992
December	(England) Dalian Atkinson	Aston Villa	Sheffield Wednesday	Hillsborough	Premiership	5 December 1992
January	(England) Julian Joachim	Leicester City	Barnsley	Oakwell	FA Cup	20 January 1993
February	(Trinidad and Tobago) Dwight Yorke	Aston Villa	Ipswich Town	Villa Park	Premiership	6 February 1993
March	(Trinidad and Tobago) Dwight Yorke	Aston Villa	Sheffield Wednesday	Villa Park	Premiership	17 March 1993
April	(Wales) Ian Rush	Liverpool	Oldham Athletic	Anfield	Premiership	10 April 1993
May	(Wales) Ryan Giggs	Manchester United	Blackburn Rovers	Old Trafford	Premiership	3 May 1993

=== 1993–94 ===
Key: Goal of the Season

Month	Scorer	For	Against	Stadium	Competition	Date
August	(Wales) Jeremy Goss	Norwich City	Leeds United	Elland Road	Premiership	21 August 1993
September	(Nigeria) Efan Ekoku	Norwich City	Everton	Goodison Park	Premiership	25 September 1993
October	(England) Matt Le Tissier	Southampton	Newcastle United	The Dell	Premiership	24 October 1993
November	(England) Darren Anderton	Tottenham Hotspur	Queens Park Rangers	Loftus Road	Premiership	27 November 1993
December	(England) Ian Wright	Arsenal	Swindon Town	County Ground	Premiership	27 December 1993
January	(Wales) Mark Hughes	Manchester United	Sheffield United	Bramall Lane	FA Cup	9 January 1994
February	(France) Eric Cantona	Manchester United	Wimbledon	Selhurst Park	FA Cup	20 February 1994
March	(England) Ian Wright	Arsenal	Southampton	The Dell	Premiership	19 March 1994
April	(England) Rod Wallace	Leeds United	Tottenham Hotspur	Elland Road	Premiership	17 April 1994
May	(Wales) Barry Horne	Everton	Wimbledon	Goodison Park	Premiership	7 May 1994

=== 1994–95 ===
Key: Goal of the Season

Month	Scorer	For	Against	Stadium	Competition	Date
August	(England) Matt Le Tissier	Southampton	Aston Villa	Villa Park	Premiership	24 August 1994
September	(England) Andy Cole	Newcastle United	Chelsea	St James' Park	Premiership	10 September 1994
October	(England) John Barnes	Liverpool	Blackburn Rovers	Ewood Park	Premiership	15 October 1994
November	(England) Alan Shearer	Blackburn Rovers	Queens Park Rangers	Ewood Park	Premiership	26 November 1994
December	(England) Matt Le Tissier	Southampton	Blackburn Rovers	Ewood Park	Premiership	10 December 1994
January	(Zimbabwe) Peter Ndlovu	Coventry City	West Bromwich Albion	The Hawthorns	FA Cup	18 January 1995
February	(England) Andy Clarke	Wimbledon	Liverpool	Anfield	FA Cup	19 February 1995
March	(England) Teddy Sheringham	Tottenham Hotspur	Liverpool	Anfield	FA Cup	11 March 1995
April	(England) Stan Collymore	Nottingham Forest	Crystal Palace	Selhurst Park	Premiership	29 April 1995
May	(Spain) Nayim	Real Zaragoza	Arsenal	Parc des Princes	UEFA Cup Winners' Cup	10 May 1995

=== 1995–96 ===
Key: Goal of the Season

Month	Scorer	For	Against	Stadium	Competition	Date
August	(Ghana) Tony Yeboah	Leeds United	Liverpool	Elland Road	Premiership	21 August 1995
September	(Ghana) Tony Yeboah	Leeds United	Wimbledon	Selhurst Park	Premiership	23 September 1995
October	(England) Ian Wright	Arsenal	Leeds United	Elland Road	Premiership	14 October 1995
November	(England) Teddy Sheringham	Tottenham Hotspur	Coventry City	Highfield Road	Premiership	4 November 1995
December	(England) Alan Shearer	Blackburn Rovers	Tottenham Hotspur	Ewood Park	Premiership	30 December 1995
January	(England) Ian Wright	Arsenal	Everton	Highbury	Premiership	20 January 1996
February	(England) Ian Woan	Nottingham Forest	Tottenham Hotspur	City Ground	Premiership	28 February 1996
March	(Georgia (country)) Georgi Kinkladze	Manchester City	Southampton	Maine Road	Premiership	16 March 1996
April	(England) Alan Shearer	Blackburn Rovers	Wimbledon	Ewood Park	Premiership	17 April 1996
May	(England) Peter Beardsley	Newcastle United	Nottingham Forest	City Ground	Premiership	2 May 1996

=== 1996–97 ===
Key: Goal of the Season

Month	Scorer	For	Against	Stadium	Competition	Date
August	(England) David Beckham	Manchester United	Wimbledon	Selhurst Park	Premiership	17 August 1996
September	(Czech Republic) Karel Poborský	Manchester United	Leeds United	Elland Road	Premiership	7 September 1996
October	(France) David Ginola	Newcastle United	Ferencváros	St James' Park	UEFA Cup	15 October 1996
November	(Netherlands) Dennis Bergkamp	Arsenal	Tottenham Hotspur	Highbury	Premiership	24 November 1996
December	(France) Eric Cantona	Manchester United	Sunderland	Old Trafford	Premiership	21 December 1996
January	(England) Trevor Sinclair	Queens Park Rangers	Barnsley	Loftus Road	FA Cup	25 January 1997
February	(Italy) Gianfranco Zola	Chelsea	Manchester United	Stamford Bridge	Premiership	22 February 1997
March	(Brazil) Juninho	Middlesbrough	Chelsea	Riverside Stadium	Premiership	22 March 1997
April	(Italy) Gianfranco Zola	Chelsea	Wimbledon	Highbury	FA Cup	13 April 1997
May	(Brazil) Juninho	Middlesbrough	Manchester United	Old Trafford	Premiership	5 May 1997

=== 1997–98 ===
Key: Goal of the Season

Month	Scorer	For	Against	Stadium	Competition	Date
August	(Netherlands) Dennis Bergkamp	Arsenal	Leicester City	Filbert Street	Premiership	27 August 1997
September	(England) Steve McManaman	Liverpool	Celtic	Celtic Park	UEFA Cup	16 September 1997
October	(England) Paul Scholes	Manchester United	Barnsley	Old Trafford	Premiership	25 October 1997
November	(England) Kevin Davies	Southampton	Everton	Goodison Park	Premiership	2 November 1997
December	(England) Darren Huckerby	Coventry City	Manchester United	Highfield Road	Premiership	28 December 1997
January	(Georgia (country)) Georgi Kinkladze	Manchester City	West Ham United	Maine Road	FA Cup	25 January 1998
February	(Wales) Ryan Giggs	Manchester United	Derby County	Old Trafford	Premiership	21 February 1998
March	(England) Alan Thompson	Bolton Wanderers	Liverpool	Anfield	Premiership	7 March 1998
April	(France) Patrick Vieira	Arsenal	Newcastle United	Highbury	Premiership	11 April 1998
May	(England) Dean Gordon	Crystal Palace	Bolton Wanderers	Reebok Stadium	Premiership	2 May 1998

=== 1998–99 ===
Key: Goal of the Season

Month	Scorer	For	Against	Stadium	Competition	Date
August	(England) Michael Owen	Liverpool	Newcastle United	St James' Park	Premiership	30 August 1998
September	(England) Emile Heskey	Leicester City	Arsenal	Filbert Street	Premiership	12 September 1998
October	(Turkey) Muzzy Izzet	Leicester City	Tottenham Hotspur	Filbert Street	Premiership	19 October 1998
November	(England) Steve Froggatt	Coventry City	Everton	Highfield Road	Premiership	16 November 1998
December	(Netherlands) Dennis Bergkamp	Arsenal	Aston Villa	Villa Park	Premiership	13 December 1998
January	(England) Darren Huckerby	Coventry City	Nottingham Forest	Highfield Road	Premiership	9 January 1999
February	(England) Darren Anderton	Tottenham Hotspur	Leeds United	White Hart Lane	FA Cup	24 February 1999
March	(France) David Ginola	Tottenham Hotspur	Barnsley	Oakwell	FA Cup	16 March 1999
April	(Wales) Ryan Giggs	Manchester United	Arsenal	Villa Park	FA Cup	14 April 1999
May	(France) Emmanuel Petit	Arsenal	Tottenham Hotspur	White Hart Lane	Premiership	5 May 1999

=== 1999–2000 ===
Key: Goal of the Season

Month	Scorer	For	Against	Stadium	Competition	Date
August	(Uruguay) Gus Poyet	Chelsea	Sunderland	Stamford Bridge	Premiership	7 August 1999
September	(Latvia) Marians Pahars	Southampton	Manchester United	Old Trafford	Premiership	25 September 1999
October	(Republic of Ireland) Stephen Carr	Tottenham Hotspur	Manchester United	White Hart Lane	Premiership	23 October 1999
November	(England) Andy Cole	Manchester United	Leicester City	Old Trafford	Premiership	6 November 1999
December	(France) David Ginola	Tottenham Hotspur	Watford	White Hart Lane	Premiership	26 December 1999
January	(Italy) Benito Carbone	Aston Villa	Leeds United	Villa Park	FA Cup	30 January 2000
February	(England) Andy Cole	Manchester United	Coventry City	Old Trafford	Premiership	5 February 2000
March	(Italy) Paolo Di Canio	West Ham United	Wimbledon	Upton Park	Premiership	26 March 2000
April	(England) Paul Scholes	Manchester United	Middlesbrough	Riverside Stadium	Premiership	10 April 2000
May	(Brazil) Sylvinho	Arsenal	Sheffield Wednesday	Highbury	Premiership	9 May 2000

=== 2000–01 ===
Key: Goal of the Season

Month	Scorer	For	Against	Stadium	Competition	Date
August	(Croatia) Mario Stanić	Chelsea	West Ham United	Stamford Bridge	Premiership	19 August 2000
September	(Brazil) Sylvinho	Arsenal	Chelsea	Stamford Bridge	Premiership	6 September 2000
October	(France) Thierry Henry	Arsenal	Manchester United	Highbury	Premiership	1 October 2000
November	(England) Andy Cole	Manchester United	Coventry City	Highfield Road	Premiership	4 November 2000
December	(England) Trevor Sinclair	West Ham United	Derby County	Upton Park	Premiership	26 December 2000
January	(Colombia) Hámilton Ricard	Middlesbrough	Bradford City	Valley Parade	FA Cup	8 January 2001
February	(Netherlands) Jimmy Floyd Hasselbaink	Chelsea	Arsenal	Highbury	FA Cup	18 February 2001
March	(England) Steven Gerrard	Liverpool	Manchester United	Anfield	Premiership	31 March 2001
April	(South Africa) Shaun Bartlett	Charlton Athletic	Leicester City	The Valley	Premiership	1 April 2001
May	(England) Paul Merson	Aston Villa	Coventry City	Villa Park	Premiership	2 May 2001

=== 2001–02 ===
Awarded by ITV Sport's The Premiership.

Key: Goal of the Season

Month	Scorer	For	Against	Stadium	Competition	Date	Ref
March	(Netherlands) Dennis Bergkamp	Arsenal	Newcastle United	St James' Park	Premiership	2 March 2002	

=== 2002–03 ===
Awarded by ITV Sport's The Premiership.

Key: Goal of the Season

Month	Scorer	For	Against	Stadium	Competition	Date
August	(France) Sylvain Wiltord	Arsenal	Birmingham City	Highbury	Premiership	18 August 2002
September	(Italy) Paolo Di Canio	West Ham United	Chelsea	Stamford Bridge	Premiership	28 September 2002
October	(England) Wayne Rooney	Everton	Arsenal	Goodison Park	Premiership	19 October 2002
November	(France) Thierry Henry	Arsenal	Tottenham Hotspur	Highbury	Premiership	16 November 2002
December	(England) Alan Shearer	Newcastle United	Everton	St James' Park	Premiership	1 December 2002
January	(Iceland) Eiður Guðjohnsen	Chelsea	Leeds United	Stamford Bridge	Premiership	28 January 2003
February	(Cameroon) Geremi	Middlesbrough	Liverpool	Anfield	Premiership	8 February 2003
March	(Netherlands) Ruud van Nistelrooy	Manchester United	Fulham	Old Trafford	Premiership	22 March 2003
April	(Nigeria) Jay-Jay Okocha	Bolton Wanderers	West Ham United	Reebok Stadium	Premiership	19 April 2003

=== 2003–04 ===
Awarded by ITV Sport's The Premiership.

Key: Goal of the Season

Month	Scorer	For	Against	Stadium	Competition	Date
September	(Scotland) Alex Rae	Wolverhampton Wanderers	Bolton Wanderers	Reebook Stadium	Premiership	27 September 2003
March	(Germany) Dietmar Hamann	Liverpool	Portsmouth	Anfield	Premiership	17 March 2004

=== 2004–05 ===
Key: Goal of the Season

Month	Scorer	For	Against	Stadium	Competition	Date	Ref.
August	(Czech Republic) Patrick Berger	Portsmouth	Charlton Athletic	The Valley	Premiership	21 August 2004	
September	(England) Lee Hendrie	Aston Villa	Crystal Palace	Villa Park	Premiership	25 September 2004	
October	(France) Thierry Henry	Arsenal	Charlton Athletic	Highbury	Premiership	2 October 2004	
November	(Spain) Xabi Alonso	Liverpool	Arsenal	Anfield	Premiership	28 November 2004	
December	(Netherlands) Arjen Robben	Chelsea	Norwich City	Stamford Bridge	Premiership	18 December 2004	
January	(England) Wayne Rooney	Manchester United	Middlesbrough	Old Trafford	FA Cup	29 January 2005	
February	(France) Thierry Henry	Arsenal	Crystal Palace	Highbury	Premiership	14 February 2005	
March	(Greece) Stelios Giannakopoulos	Bolton Wanderers	Norwich City	Reebok Stadium	Premiership	19 March 2005	
April	(England) Wayne Rooney	Manchester United	Newcastle United	Old Trafford	Premiership	24 April 2005	
May	(France) Patrick Vieira	Arsenal	Everton	Highbury	Premiership	11 May 2005	

=== 2005–06 ===
Key: Goal of the Season

Month	Scorer	For	Against	Stadium	Competition	Date	Ref.
August	(Norway) Morten Gamst Pedersen	Blackburn Rovers	Fulham	Ewood Park	Premiership	20 August 2005	
September	(England) Kevin Nolan	Bolton Wanderers	Portsmouth	Reebok Stadium	Premiership	24 September 2005	
October	(England) Matthew Taylor	Portsmouth	Sunderland	Stadium of Light	Premiership	29 October 2005	
November	(Netherlands) Collins John	Fulham	Middlesbrough	Riverside Stadium	Premiership	20 November 2005	
December	(Republic of Ireland) Steven Reid	Blackburn Rovers	Wigan Athletic	JJB Stadium	Premiership	31 December 2005	
January	(Republic of Ireland) Liam Lawrence	Sunderland	Fulham	Craven Cottage	Premiership	2 January 2006	
February	(Peru) Nolberto Solano	Newcastle United	Everton	St James' Park	Premiership	25 February 2006	
March	(Senegal) Henri Camara	Wigan Athletic	Sunderland	Stadium of Light	Premiership	11 March 2006	
April	(Wales) Craig Bellamy	Blackburn Rovers	Portsmouth	Fratton Park	Premiership	8 April 2006	
May	(England) Steven Gerrard	Liverpool	West Ham United	Millennium Stadium	FA Cup	13 May 2006	

=== 2006–07 ===
Key: Goal of the Season

Month	Scorer	For	Against	Stadium	Competition	Date
August	(Denmark) Daniel Agger	Liverpool	West Ham United	Anfield	Premiership	26 August 2006
September	(Netherlands) Robin van Persie	Arsenal	Charlton Athletic	The Valley	Premiership	29 September 2006
October	(England) Gareth Barry	Aston Villa	Tottenham Hotspur	Villa Park	Premiership	14 October 2006
November	(France) Nicolas Anelka	Bolton Wanderers	Arsenal	Reebok Stadium	Premiership	25 November 2006
December	(England) Paul Scholes	Manchester United	Aston Villa	Villa Park	Premiership	23 December 2006
January	(England) Wayne Rooney	Manchester United	Portsmouth	Old Trafford	FA Cup	27 January 2007
February	(Netherlands) Denny Landzaat	Wigan Athletic	Arsenal	Emirates Stadium	Premiership	11 February 2007
March	(England) Wayne Rooney	Manchester United	Bolton Wanderers	Old Trafford	Premiership	17 March 2007
April	(Scotland) James McFadden	Everton	Charlton Athletic	Goodison Park	Premiership	15 April 2007
May	(England) Craig Gardner	Aston Villa	Bolton Wanderers	Reebok Stadium	Premiership	13 May 2007

=== 2007–08 ===
Key: Goal of the Season

Month	Scorer	For	Against	Stadium	Competition	Date
August	(France) Charles N'Zogbia	Newcastle United	Middlesbrough	Riverside Stadium	Premier League	26 August 2007
September	(Togo) Emmanuel Adebayor	Arsenal	Tottenham Hotspur	White Hart Lane	Premier League	15 September 2007
October	(Argentina) Carlos Tevez	Manchester United	Middlesbrough	Old Trafford	Premier League	27 October 2007
November	(England) Luke Young	Middlesbrough	Tottenham Hotspur	Riverside Stadium	Premier League	3 November 2007
December	(Turkey) Tuncay	Middlesbrough	Derby County	Pride Park	Premier League	15 December 2007
January	(Portugal) Cristiano Ronaldo	Manchester United	Portsmouth	Old Trafford	Premier League	30 January 2008
February	(Republic of Ireland) Daryl Murphy	Sunderland	Wigan Athletic	Stadium of Light	Premier League	9 February 2008
March	(Portugal) Cristiano Ronaldo	Manchester United	Aston Villa	Old Trafford	Premier League	29 March 2008
April	(Bulgaria) Stiliyan Petrov	Aston Villa	Derby County	Pride Park	Premier League	12 April 2008
May	(Brazil) Fábio Rochemback	Middlesbrough	Manchester City	Riverside Stadium	Premier League	11 May 2008

=== 2008–09 ===
Key: Goal of the Season

Month	Scorer	For	Against	Stadium	Competition	Date
August	(Jamaica) Ricardo Fuller	Stoke City	Aston Villa	Britannia Stadium	Premier League	23 August 2008
September	(Brazil) Geovanni	Hull City	Arsenal	Emirates Stadium	Premier League	27 September 2008
October	(England) David Bentley	Tottenham Hotspur	Arsenal	Emirates Stadium	Premier League	29 October 2008
November	(England) Glen Johnson	Portsmouth	Hull City	Fratton Park	Premier League	22 November 2008
December	(Netherlands) Robin van Persie	Arsenal	Liverpool	Emirates Stadium	Premier League	21 December 2008
January	(England) Paul Konchesky	Fulham	West Ham United	Upton Park	Premier League	18 January 2009
February	(Wales) Ryan Giggs	Manchester United	West Ham United	Upton Park	Premier League	8 February 2009
March	(England) Carlton Cole	West Ham United	Wigan Athletic	JJB Stadium	Premier League	4 March 2009
April	(Spain) Fernando Torres	Liverpool	Blackburn Rovers	Anfield	Premier League	11 April 2009
May	(Turkey) Tuncay	Middlesbrough	Aston Villa	Riverside Stadium	Premier League	16 May 2009

=== 2009–10 ===
Key: Goal of the Season

Month	Scorer	For	Against	Stadium	Competition	Date
August	(England) Carlton Cole	West Ham United	Tottenham Hotspur	Upton Park	Premier League	23 August 2009
September	(Wales) Craig Bellamy	Manchester City	Manchester United	Old Trafford	Premier League	20 September 2009
October	(Ivory Coast) Didier Drogba	Chelsea	Bolton Wanderers	Reebok Stadium	Premier League	31 October 2009
November	(England) Cameron Jerome	Birmingham City	Liverpool	Anfield	Premier League	9 November 2009
December	(Honduras) Maynor Figueroa	Wigan Athletic	Stoke City	Britannia Stadium	Premier League	12 December 2009
January	(England) Ashley Cole	Chelsea	Sunderland	Stamford Bridge	Premier League	16 January 2010
February	(Republic of Ireland) Damien Duff	Fulham	Birmingham City	Craven Cottage	Premier League	21 February 2010
March	(Spain) Fernando Torres	Liverpool	Sunderland	Anfield	Premier League	28 March 2010
April	(England) Danny Rose	Tottenham Hotspur	Arsenal	White Hart Lane	Premier League	14 April 2010
May	(England) Tom Huddlestone	Tottenham Hotspur	Bolton Wanderers	White Hart Lane	Premier League	1 May 2010

=== 2010–11 ===
Key: Goal of the Season

Month	Scorer	For	Against	Stadium	Competition	Date
August	(Wales) Gareth Bale	Tottenham Hotspur	Stoke City	Britannia Stadium	Premier League	21 August 2010
September	(Bulgaria) Dimitar Berbatov	Manchester United	Liverpool	Old Trafford	Premier League	19 September 2010
October	(Brazil) Alex	Chelsea	Arsenal	Stamford Bridge	Premier League	3 October 2010
November	(Bulgaria) Dimitar Berbatov	Manchester United	Blackburn Rovers	Old Trafford	Premier League	27 November 2010
December	(Netherlands) Rafael van der Vaart	Tottenham Hotspur	Aston Villa	Villa Park	Premier League	26 December 2010
January	(Portugal) Raul Meireles	Liverpool	Wolverhampton Wanderers	Molineux Stadium	Premier League	22 January 2011
February	(England) Wayne Rooney	Manchester United	Manchester City	Old Trafford	Premier League	12 February 2011
March	(Scotland) Charlie Adam	Blackpool	Blackburn Rovers	Ewood Park	Premier League	19 March 2011
April	(Republic of Ireland) Simon Cox	West Bromwich Albion	Tottenham Hotspur	White Hart Lane	Premier League	23 April 2011
May	(Argentina) Carlos Tevez	Manchester City	Stoke City	City of Manchester Stadium	Premier League	17 May 2011

=== 2011–12 ===
Key: Goal of the Season

Month	Scorer	For	Against	Stadium	Competition	Date
August	(Bosnia and Herzegovina) Edin Džeko	Manchester City	Tottenham Hotspur	White Hart Lane	Premier League	28 August 2011
September	(Bulgaria) Stiliyan Petrov	Aston Villa	Everton	Goodison Park	Premier League	10 September 2011
October	(Costa Rica) Bryan Ruiz	Fulham	Everton	Craven Cottage	Premier League	23 October 2011
November	(England) Ryan Taylor	Newcastle United	Everton	St James' Park	Premier League	5 November 2011
December	(Netherlands) Robin van Persie	Arsenal	Everton	Emirates Stadium	Premier League	10 December 2011
January	(Benin) Stéphane Sessègnon	Sunderland	Swansea City	Stadium of Light	Premier League	21 January 2012
February	(England) Fraizer Campbell	Sunderland	Norwich City	Stadium of Light	Premier League	1 February 2012
March	(England) Peter Crouch	Stoke City	Manchester City	Britannia Stadium	Premier League	24 March 2012
April	(France) Hatem Ben Arfa	Newcastle United	Bolton Wanderers	St James' Park	Premier League	9 April 2012
May	(Senegal) Papiss Cissé	Newcastle United	Chelsea	Stamford Bridge	Premier League	2 May 2012

=== 2012–13 ===
Key: Goal of the Season

Month	Scorer	For	Against	Stadium	Competition	Date
August	(Netherlands) Robin van Persie	Manchester United	Fulham	Old Trafford	Premier League	25 August 2012
September	(France) Hatem Ben Arfa	Newcastle United	Aston Villa	St James' Park	Premier League	2 September 2012
October	(Morocco) Adel Taarabt	Queens Park Rangers	West Ham United	Loftus Road	Premier League	1 October 2012
November	(England) Jermain Defoe	Tottenham Hotspur	West Ham United	White Hart Lane	Premier League	22 November 2012
December	(England) Theo Walcott	Arsenal	Newcastle United	Emirates Stadium	Premier League	29 December 2012
January	(Wales) Gareth Bale	Tottenham Hotspur	Norwich City	Carrow Road	Premier League	30 January 2013
February	(Wales) Gareth Bale	Tottenham Hotspur	West Ham United	Upton Park	Premier League	25 February 2013
March	(England) Andy Carroll	West Ham United	West Bromwich Albion	Upton Park	Premier League	30 March 2013
April	(Netherlands) Robin van Persie	Manchester United	Aston Villa	Old Trafford	Premier League	22 April 2013
May	(Belgium) Kevin Mirallas	Everton	West Ham United	Goodison Park	Premier League	12 May 2013

=== 2013–14 ===
Key: Goal of the Season

Month	Scorer	For	Against	Stadium	Competition	Date
August	(Netherlands) Robin van Persie	Manchester United	Swansea City	Liberty Stadium	Premier League	17 August 2013
September	(England) Jordon Mutch	Cardiff City	Fulham	Craven Cottage	Premier League	28 September 2013
October	(England) Jack Wilshere	Arsenal	Norwich City	Emirates Stadium	Premier League	19 October 2013
November	(Wales) Aaron Ramsey	Arsenal	Liverpool	Emirates Stadium	Premier League	2 November 2013
December	(Uruguay) Luis Suárez	Liverpool	Norwich City	Anfield	Premier League	4 December 2013
January	(England) Daniel Sturridge	Liverpool	Everton	Anfield	Premier League	28 January 2014
February	(Czech Republic) Tomáš Rosický	Arsenal	Sunderland	Emirates Stadium	Premier League	22 February 2014
March	(England) Wayne Rooney	Manchester United	West Ham United	Upton Park	Premier League	22 March 2014
April	(England) Jonjo Shelvey	Swansea City	Aston Villa	Liberty Stadium	Premier League	26 April 2014
May	(England) Ross Barkley	Everton	Manchester City	Goodison Park	Premier League	3 May 2014

=== 2014–15 ===
Key: Goal of the Season

Month	Scorer	For	Against	Stadium	Competition	Date
August	(Germany) André Schürrle	Chelsea	Burnley	Turf Moor	Premier League	18 August 2014
September	(Argentina) Ángel Di María	Manchester United	Leicester City	King Power Stadium	Premier League	21 September 2014
October	(Spain) David Silva	Manchester City	West Ham United	Upton Park	Premier League	25 October 2014
November	(Spain) Ayoze Pérez	Newcastle United	West Bromwich Albion	The Hawthorns	Premier League	9 November 2014
December	(England) Ross Barkley	Everton	Queens Park Rangers	Goodison Park	Premier League	15 December 2014
January	(England) Harry Kane	Tottenham Hotspur	Chelsea	White Hart Lane	Premier League	1 January 2015
February	(Brazil) Philippe Coutinho	Liverpool	Southampton	St Mary's Stadium	Premier League	22 February 2015
March	(Spain) Juan Mata	Manchester United	Liverpool	Anfield	Premier League	22 March 2015
April	(Scotland) Charlie Adam	Stoke City	Chelsea	Stamford Bridge	Premier League	4 April 2015
May	(England) Jack Wilshere	Arsenal	West Bromwich Albion	Emirates Stadium	Premier League	24 May 2015

=== 2015–16 ===
Key: Goal of the Season

Month	Scorer	For	Against	Stadium	Competition	Date
August	(Brazil) Philippe Coutinho	Liverpool	Stoke City	Britannia Stadium	Premier League	9 August 2015
September	(Belgium) Christian Benteke	Liverpool	Manchester United	Old Trafford	Premier League	12 September 2015
October	(Chile) Alexis Sánchez	Arsenal	Manchester United	Emirates Stadium	Premier League	4 October 2015
November	(England) Adam Smith	Bournemouth	Everton	Vitality Stadium	Premier League	28 November 2015
December	(Curaçao) Cuco Martina	Southampton	Arsenal	St. Mary's Stadium	Premier League	26 December 2015
January	(England) Dele Alli	Tottenham Hotspur	Crystal Palace	Selhurst Park	Premier League	23 January 2016
February	(England) Jamie Vardy	Leicester City	Liverpool	King Power Stadium	Premier League	2 February 2016
March	(England) Harry Kane	Tottenham Hotspur	Arsenal	White Hart Lane	Premier League	5 March 2016
April	(France) Dimitri Payet	West Ham United	Crystal Palace	Upton Park	Premier League	2 April 2016
May	(Belgium) Eden Hazard	Chelsea	Tottenham Hotspur	Stamford Bridge	Premier League	2 May 2016

=== 2016–17 ===
Key: Goal of the Season

Month	Scorer	For	Against	Stadium	Competition	Date
August	(Senegal) Sadio Mané	Liverpool	Arsenal	Emirates Stadium	Premier League	14 August 2016
September	(England) Jordan Henderson	Liverpool	Chelsea	Stamford Bridge	Premier League	16 September 2016
October	(Uruguay) Gastón Ramírez	Middlesbrough	Bournemouth	Riverside Stadium	Premier League	29 October 2016
November	(France) Paul Pogba	Manchester United	Swansea City	Liberty Stadium	Premier League	6 November 2016
December (Note: Mkhitaryan's goal won the public vote, but Bradley Lowery, a then 5-year-old Sunderland fan with neuroblastoma, was given a special honour for scoring a penalty against Chelsea's Asmir Begović, during the warm-ups prior to the match with Sunderland on 14 December 2016.)	(Armenia) Henrikh Mkhitaryan	Manchester United	Sunderland	Old Trafford	Premier League	26 December 2016
January	(France) Olivier Giroud	Arsenal	Crystal Palace	Emirates Stadium	Premier League	1 January 2017
February	(Belgium) Eden Hazard	Chelsea	Arsenal	Stamford Bridge	Premier League	7 February 2017
March	(Netherlands) Georginio Wijnaldum	Liverpool	Arsenal	Anfield	Premier League	4 March 2017
April	(Brazil) Roberto Firmino	Liverpool	Stoke City	Bet365 Stadium	Premier League	8 April 2017
May	(Germany) Emre Can	Liverpool	Watford	Vicarage Road	Premier League	1 May 2017

=== 2017–18 ===
Key: Goal of the Season

Month	Scorer	For	Against	Stadium	Competition	Date
August	(England) Charlie Daniels	Bournemouth	Manchester City	Vitality Stadium	Premier League	26 August 2017
September	(Ecuador) Antonio Valencia	Manchester United	Everton	Old Trafford	Premier League	17 September 2017
October	(Morocco) Sofiane Boufal	Southampton	West Bromwich Albion	St Mary's Stadium	Premier League	21 October 2017
November	(England) Wayne Rooney	Everton	West Ham United	Goodison Park	Premier League	29 November 2017
December	(Egypt) Mohamed Salah	Liverpool	Everton	Anfield	Premier League	10 December 2017
January	(Equatorial Guinea) Pedro Obiang	West Ham United	Tottenham Hotspur	Wembley Stadium	Premier League	4 January 2018
February	(Egypt) Mohamed Salah	Liverpool	Tottenham Hotspur	Anfield	Premier League	4 February 2018
March	(England) Jamie Vardy	Leicester City	West Bromwich Albion	The Hawthorns	Premier League	10 March 2018
April	(Belgium) Kevin De Bruyne	Manchester City	Swansea City	City of Manchester Stadium	Premier League	22 April 2018

=== 2018–19 ===
Key: Goal of the Season

Month	Scorer	For	Against	Stadium	Competition	Date
August	(Ivory Coast) Jean Michaël Seri	Fulham	Burnley	Craven Cottage	Premier League	25 August 2018
September	(England) Daniel Sturridge	Liverpool	Chelsea	Stamford Bridge	Premier League	29 September 2018
October	(Wales) Aaron Ramsey	Arsenal	Fulham	Craven Cottage	Premier League	7 October 2018
November	(Canada) Junior Hoilett	Cardiff City	Wolverhampton Wanderers	Cardiff City Stadium	Premier League	30 November 2018
December	(England) Andros Townsend	Crystal Palace	Manchester City	City of Manchester Stadium	Premier League	22 December 2018
January	(Germany) André Schürrle	Fulham	Burnley	Turf Moor	Premier League	12 January 2019
February	(Switzerland) Fabian Schär	Newcastle United	Burnley	St James' Park	Premier League	26 February 2019
March	(Brazil) Andreas Pereira	Manchester United	Southampton	Old Trafford	Premier League	2 March 2019
April	(Egypt) Mohamed Salah	Liverpool	Chelsea	Anfield	Premier League	14 April 2019
May	(Belgium) Vincent Kompany	Manchester City	Leicester City	City of Manchester Stadium	Premier League	6 May 2019

=== 2019–20 ===
Key: Goal of the Season

Month	Scorer	For	Against	Stadium	Competition	Date	Ref.
August	(Wales) Harry Wilson	Bournemouth	Manchester City	Vitality Stadium	Premier League	25 August 2019	
September	(Egypt) Mohamed Salah	Liverpool	Newcastle United	Anfield	Premier League	14 September 2019	
October	(England) Matty Longstaff	Newcastle United	Manchester United	St James' Park	Premier League	6 October 2019	
November	(Belgium) Kevin De Bruyne	Manchester City	Newcastle United	St James' Park	Premier League	30 November 2019	
December	(South Korea) Son Heung-min	Tottenham Hotspur	Burnley	Tottenham Hotspur Stadium	Premier League	7 December 2019	
January	(Iran) Alireza Jahanbakhsh	Brighton & Hove Albion	Chelsea	Falmer Stadium	Premier League	1 January 2020	
February	(France) Anthony Martial	Manchester United	Watford	Old Trafford	Premier League	23 February 2020	
March/June (Note: Due to the stoppage of play caused by the COVID-19 pandemic, the months of March and June 2020 were combined into a single Goal of the Month award.)	(Brazil) Fabinho	Liverpool	Crystal Palace	Anfield	Premier League	24 June 2020	
July	(Mexico) Raúl Jiménez	Wolverhampton Wanderers	Burnley	Turf Moor	Premier League	15 July 2020	
July	(Belgium) Kevin De Bruyne	Manchester City	Norwich City	City of Manchester Stadium	Premier League	26 July 2020	

=== 2020–21 ===
Key: Goal of the Season

Month	Scorer	For	Against	Stadium	Competition	Date	Ref.
September	(England) James Maddison	Leicester City	Manchester City	City of Manchester Stadium	Premier League	27 September 2020	
October	(Argentina) Manuel Lanzini	West Ham United	Tottenham Hotspur	Tottenham Hotspur Stadium	Premier League	18 October 2020	
November	(England) Danny Ings	Southampton	Aston Villa	Villa Park	Premier League	1 November 2020	
December	(Ivory Coast) Sébastien Haller	West Ham United	Crystal Palace	London Stadium	Premier League	16 December 2020	
January	(Egypt) Mohamed Salah	Liverpool	West Ham United	London Stadium	Premier League	31 January 2021	
February	(Portugal) Bruno Fernandes	Manchester United	Everton	Old Trafford	Premier League	6 February 2021	
March	(Argentina) Erik Lamela	Tottenham Hotspur	Arsenal	Emirates Stadium	Premier League	14 March 2021	
April	(England) Jesse Lingard	West Ham United	Wolverhampton Wanderers	London Stadium	Premier League	5 April 2021	
May	(Spain) Ferran Torres	Manchester City	Newcastle United	St James' Park	Premier League	14 May 2021	
May	(Uruguay) Edinson Cavani	Manchester United	Fulham	Old Trafford	Premier League	18 May 2021	

=== 2021–22 ===
Key: Goal of the Season

Month	Scorer	For	Against	Stadium	Competition	Date	Ref.
August	(England) Danny Ings	Aston Villa	Newcastle United	Villa Park	Premier League	21 August 2021	
September	(England) Andros Townsend	Everton	Burnley	Goodison Park	Premier League	13 September 2021	
October	(Egypt) Mohamed Salah	Liverpool	Manchester City	Anfield	Premier League	3 October 2021	
November	(Spain) Rodri	Manchester City	Everton	City of Manchester Stadium	Premier League	21 November 2021	
December	(England) Trent Alexander-Arnold	Liverpool	Newcastle United	Anfield	Premier League	16 December 2021	
January	(Croatia) Mateo Kovačić	Chelsea	Liverpool	Stamford Bridge	Premier League	2 January 2022	
February	(Senegal) Sadio Mané	Liverpool	Norwich City	Anfield	Premier League	19 February 2022	
March	(Portugal) Rúben Neves	Wolverhampton Wanderers	Watford	Molineux Stadium	Premier League	10 March 2022	
April	(Switzerland) Granit Xhaka	Arsenal	Manchester United	Emirates Stadium	Premier League	23 April 2022	
May	(Ukraine) Vitaliy Mykolenko	Everton	Leicester City	King Power Stadium	Premier League	8 May 2022	

=== 2022–23 ===
Key: Goal of the Season

Month	Scorer	For	Against	Stadium	Competition	Date	Ref.
August	(France) Allan Saint-Maximin	Newcastle United	Wolverhampton Wanderers	Molineux Stadium	Premier League	28 August 2022	
September	(South Korea) Son Heung-min	Tottenham Hotspur	Leicester City	Tottenham Hotspur Stadium	Premier League	17 September 2022	
October	(Paraguay) Miguel Almirón	Newcastle United	Fulham	Craven Cottage	Premier League	1 October 2022	
November/ December (Note: Due to the stoppage of play caused by the 2022 FIFA World Cup, the months of November and December 2022 were combined into a single Goal of the Month award.)	(England) Demarai Gray	Everton	Manchester City	City of Manchester Stadium	Premier League	31 December 2022	
January	(England) Marcus Rashford	Manchester United	Arsenal	Emirates Stadium	Premier League	22 January 2023	
February	(Republic of Ireland) Séamus Coleman	Everton	Leeds United	Goodison Park	Premier League	18 February 2023	
March	(England) Reiss Nelson	Arsenal	Bournemouth	Emirates Stadium	Premier League	4 March 2023	
April	(England) Jacob Murphy	Newcastle United	Everton	Goodison Park	Premier League	27 April 2023	
May	(Paraguay) Julio Enciso	Brighton & Hove Albion	Manchester City	Falmer Stadium	Premier League	24 May 2023	

=== 2023–24 ===
Key: Goal of the Season

Month	Scorer	For	Against	Stadium	Competition	Date	Ref.
August	(Japan) Kaoru Mitoma	Brighton & Hove Albion	Wolverhampton Wanderers	Molineux Stadium	Premier League	19 August 2023	
September	(Portugal) Bruno Fernandes	Manchester United	Burnley	Turf Moor	Premier League	23 September 2023	
October	(England) Eddie Nketiah	Arsenal	Sheffield United	Emirates Stadium	Premier League	28 October 2023	
November	(Argentina) Alejandro Garnacho	Manchester United	Everton	Goodison Park	Premier League	26 November 2023	
December	(Argentina) Alexis Mac Allister	Liverpool	Fulham	Anfield	Premier League	3 December 2023	
January	(England) Eberechi Eze	Crystal Palace	Sheffield United	Selhurst Park	Premier League	30 January 2024	
February	(Uruguay) Darwin Núñez	Liverpool	Brentford	Gtech Community Stadium	Premier League	17 February 2024	
March	(England) Marcus Rashford	Manchester United	Manchester City	City of Manchester Stadium	Premier League	3 March 2024	
April	(Argentina) Alexis Mac Allister	Liverpool	Sheffield United	Anfield	Premier League	4 April 2024	

=== 2024–25 ===
Key: Goal of the Season

Month	Scorer	For	Against	Stadium	Competition	Date	Ref.
August	(Colombia) Luis Díaz	Liverpool	Brentford	Anfield	Premier League	25 August 2024	
September	(Colombia) Jhon Durán	Aston Villa	Everton	Villa Park	Premier League	14 September 2024	
October	(Senegal) Nicolas Jackson	Chelsea	Newcastle United	Stamford Bridge	Premier League	27 October 2024	
November	(Egypt) Mohamed Salah	Liverpool	Brighton & Hove Albion	Anfield	Premier League	2 November 2024	
December	(Ivory Coast) Amad Diallo	Manchester United	Manchester City	City of Manchester Stadium	Premier League	15 December 2024	
January	(Netherlands) Cody Gakpo	Liverpool	Manchester United	Anfield	Premier League	5 January 2025	
February	(Japan) Kaoru Mitoma	Brighton & Hove Albion	Chelsea	Falmer Stadium	Premier League	14 February 2025	
March	(Sweden) Jens Cajuste	Ipswich Town	Nottingham Forest	Portman Road	Premier League	15 March 2025	
April	(Argentina) Alexis Mac Allister	Liverpool	Tottenham Hotspur	Anfield	Premier League	27 April 2025	

=== 2025–26 ===
Key: Goal of the Season

Month	Scorer	For	Against	Stadium	Competition	Date	Ref.
August	(Hungary) Dominik Szoboszlai	Liverpool	Arsenal	Anfield	Premier League	31 August 2025	
September	(Brazil) Gabriel Martinelli	Arsenal	Manchester City	Emirates Stadium	Premier League	21 September 2025	
October	(Argentina) Emiliano Buendía	Aston Villa	Tottenham Hotspur	Tottenham Hotspur Stadium	Premier League	19 October 2025	
November	(United States) Tyler Adams	Bournemouth	Sunderland	Stadium of Light	Premier League	29 November 2025	
December	(England) Dominic Calvert-Lewin	Leeds United	Sunderland	Stadium of Light	Premier League	28 December 2025	
December	(Wales) Harry Wilson	Fulham	Crystal Palace	Craven Cottage	Premier League	7 December 2025	(Note: Calvert-Lewin's goal was replaced with Wilson's for unclear reasons. Wilson was named as the retroactive winner, despite finishing in third place behind Calvin-Lewin and Aston Villa's Morgan Rogers with 23.92% of the vote.)
January	(England) Harrison Reed	Fulham	Liverpool	Craven Cottage	Premier League	4 January 2026	
February	(Hungary) Dominik Szoboszlai	Liverpool	Manchester City	Anfield	Premier League	8 February 2026	
February	(England) Dominic Solanke	Tottenham Hotspur	Manchester City	Tottenham Hotspur Stadium	Premier League	1 February 2026	(Note: Szoboszlai's goal was replaced with Solanke's for unclear reasons. Solanke was named as the retroactive winner, despite Leeds United's Anton Stach and Manchester United's Benjamin Šeško finishing ahead of him.)
March	(Denmark) William Osula	Newcastle United	Manchester United	St James' Park	Premier League	4 March 2026	
April	(Japan) Kaoru Mitoma	Brighton & Hove Albion	Tottenham Hotspur	Tottenham Hotspur Stadium	Premier League	18 April 2026	

=== 2026–27 ===
Key: Goal of the Season

Month	Scorer	For	Against	Stadium	Competition	Date	Ref.
August	(England) Joe Willock	Newcastle United	Liverpool	St James' Park	Premier League	23 August 2026	
September	(England) Lewis Dunk	Brighton & Hove Albion	Coventry City	Coventry Building Society Arena	Premier League	13 September 2026	
October	(Paraguay) Diego Gómez	Brighton & Hove Albion	Crystal Palace	Falmer Stadium	Premier League	18 October 2026	

== Multiple awards ==
The following table lists the number of awards won by players who have won at least two BBC Goal of the Month awards.

Players in bold are still active in the Premier League.

As of September 2026 award

Rank	Player	Awards
1	(England) Wayne Rooney	8
2	(Egypt) Mohamed Salah	7
3	(Netherlands) Robin van Persie	6
4	(Wales) Ryan Giggs	5
5	(Netherlands) Dennis Bergkamp	4
5	(England) Andy Cole	4
5	(France) Thierry Henry	4
5	(England) Alan Shearer	4
5	(England) Ian Wright	4
10	(Wales) Gareth Bale	3
10	(Belgium) Kevin De Bruyne	3
10	(France) David Ginola	3
10	(England) Matt Le Tissier	3
10	(Argentina) **Alexis Mac Allister**	3
10	(Japan) **Kaoru Mitoma**	3
10	(England) Paul Scholes	3
17	(Scotland) Charlie Adam	2
17	(England) Darren Anderton	2
17	(England) Dalian Atkinson	2
17	(England) **Ross Barkley**	2
17	(Wales) Craig Bellamy	2
17	(France) Hatem Ben Arfa	2
17	(Bulgaria) Dimitar Berbatov	2
17	(France) Eric Cantona	2
17	(England) Carlton Cole	2
17	(Brazil) Philippe Coutinho	2
17	(Italy) Paolo Di Canio	2
17	(Portugal) **Bruno Fernandes**	2
17	(England) Steven Gerrard	2
17	(Belgium) Eden Hazard	2
17	(England) Darren Huckerby	2
17	(England) Danny Ings	2
17	(Brazil) Juninho	2
17	(England) Harry Kane	2
17	(Georgia (country)) Georgi Kinkladze	2
17	(Senegal) Sadio Mané	2
17	(Bulgaria) Stiliyan Petrov	2
17	(England) Marcus Rashford	2
17	(Wales) Aaron Ramsey	2
17	(Portugal) Cristiano Ronaldo	2
17	(Germany) André Schürrle	2
17	(England) Teddy Sheringham	2
17	(England) Trevor Sinclair	2
17	(South Korea) Son Heung-min	2
17	(England) Daniel Sturridge	2
17	(Brazil) Sylvinho	2
17	(Hungary) **Dominik Szoboszlai**	2
17	(Argentina) Carlos Tevez	2
17	(Spain) Fernando Torres	2
17	(England) Andros Townsend	2
17	(Turkey) Tuncay	2
17	(England) Jamie Vardy	2
17	(France) Patrick Vieira	2
17	(England) Jack Wilshere	2
17	(Wales) **Harry Wilson**	2
17	(Ghana) Tony Yeboah	2
17	(Trinidad and Tobago) Dwight Yorke	2
17	(Italy) Gianfranco Zola	2

== Awards won by club ==
As of September 2026 award

Club	Players	Total
Manchester United	25	45
Liverpool	27	41
Arsenal	19	34
Newcastle United	17	18
Tottenham Hotspur	15	22
Chelsea	13	15
Aston Villa	11	14
Manchester City	9	12
Everton	9	11
West Ham United	9	11
Middlesbrough	7	9
Southampton	6	8
Fulham	8	8
Brighton & Hove Albion	6	7
Blackburn Rovers	4	6
Leicester City	5	6
Bolton Wanderers	5	5
Coventry City	3	4
Bournemouth	4	4
Sunderland	4	4
Leeds United	3	4
Crystal Palace	3	3
Portsmouth	3	3
Stoke City	3	3
Wigan Athletic	3	3
Wolverhampton Wanderers	3	3
Cardiff City	2	2
Norwich City	2	2
Nottingham Forest	2	2
Queens Park Rangers	2	2
Altrincham	1	1
Blackpool	1	1
Birmingham City	1	1
Charlton Athletic	1	1
Hull City	1	1
Ipswich Town	1	1
Real Zaragoza	1	1
Swansea City	1	1
West Bromwich Albion	1	1
Wimbledon	1	1

== Awards won by nationality ==
As of September 2026 award

Country	Players	Total
England	77	112
France	14	22
Netherlands	10	18
Wales	9	18
Brazil	10	13
Argentina	7	10
Spain	8	9
Belgium	5	8
Egypt	1	7
Ireland	7	7
Portugal	4	6
Italy	3	5
Senegal	4	5
Uruguay	5	5
Bulgaria	2	4
Germany	3	4
Scotland	3	4
Ivory Coast	4	4
Japan	1	3
Turkey	2	3
Colombia	3	3
Czech Republic	3	3
Paraguay	3	3
Georgia	1	2
Ghana	1	2
Hungary	1	2
South Korea	1	2
Trinidad and Tobago	1	2
Croatia	2	2
Denmark	2	2
Morocco	2	2
Nigeria	2	2
Switzerland	2	2
Armenia	1	1
Benin	1	1
Bosnia and Herzegovina	1	1
Cameroon	1	1
Canada	1	1
Chile	1	1
Costa Rica	1	1
Curaçao	1	1
Ecuador	1	1
Equatorial Guinea	1	1
Greece	1	1
Honduras	1	1
Iceland	1	1
Iran	1	1
Jamaica	1	1
Latvia	1	1
Mexico	1	1
Norway	1	1
Peru	1	1
South Africa	1	1
Sweden	1	1
Togo	1	1
Ukraine	1	1
United States	1	1
Zimbabwe	1	1

== See also ==
- BBC Goal of the Season
- Premier League Goal of the Month
