= Hüseyin Avni Lifij =

Turkish painter(1886–1924)

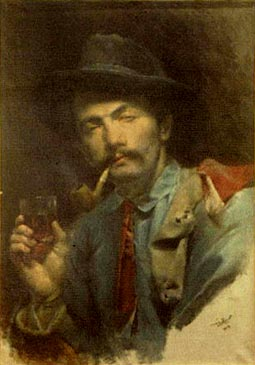
Self-portrait with Pipe (1906)

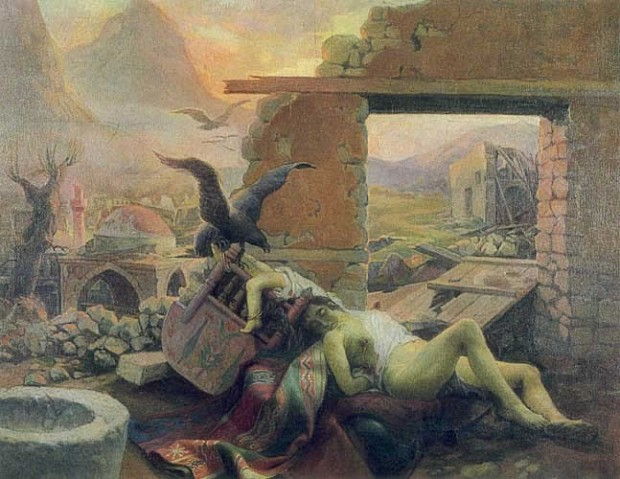
Black Day (1924) A scene from the Turkish War of Independence

Hüseyin Avni Lifij (Adyghe: Лaфыщ Хъусен; 1886, Ladik – 2 June 1927, Istanbul) was a Turkish impressionist painter of Circassian origin. He is known for landscapes with architectural features.

== Biography ==
Lifij's family was deported from Sochi to Ladik during the Circassian genocide. He began his education in 1896, in Istanbul, showing special interest in the art and music classes. In 1898, he continued his studies at the Numune-i Terakki Mektebi, a private school where he learned French. Three years later, he obtained a position in the Railways Department of the Ottoman Ministry of Public Works. While there, he continued taking lessons to improve his French. He also audited classes at a medical school and a pharmacists' school to learn anatomy and chemistry.

In 1906, Lifij met the French architect Henri Prost, who liked his work and recommended that he show some of his paintings to Osman Hamdi Bey, who was impressed with Lifij's Self-Portrait with Pipe and, after seeing more of his work, placed him on a list of candidates for a state scholarship to study in Paris. In late 1908, he was selected and, a few months later, enrolled at the École des Beaux-Arts, where he studied with Fernand Cormon.

Upon returning home in 1912, Lifij obtained a position teaching at Istanbul High School. In 1915, he began teaching French at the Kandilli Anatolian High School for Girls. The following year, he participated in the first Galatasaray Exhibition, which would later become a major venue for new artists.

In 1918, he presented eighteen canvases at an exhibition in Vienna devoted to war paintings.

In 1922, Lifij and his wife went to a teacher's conference in Bursa, where they met President Atatürk. They were invited to spend four months with the president in Ankara, where Lifij produced several portraits, including one of Marshall Fevzi Çakmak, and began one of his best-known paintings, Karagün (Black Day).

In 1924, he was appointed a professor at the Sanayi-i Nefise Mektebi (School of Fine Arts, now part of the Mimar Sinan Fine Arts University), a position he retained until his sudden death at the age of forty-one, apparently from a heart attack.
