= Sazak (surname) =

Sazak is a surname of Turkish origin. It refers to wind in the Turkish dialects spoken in Anatolia. Notable people with the surname include:

- Derya Sazak (born 1956), Turkish journalist
- Gün Sazak (1932–1980), assassinated Turkish politician
- Güven Sazak (1935–2011), former president of Fenerbahçe SK
