= 42nd government of Turkey =

Government of the Republic of Turkey (1978-1979)

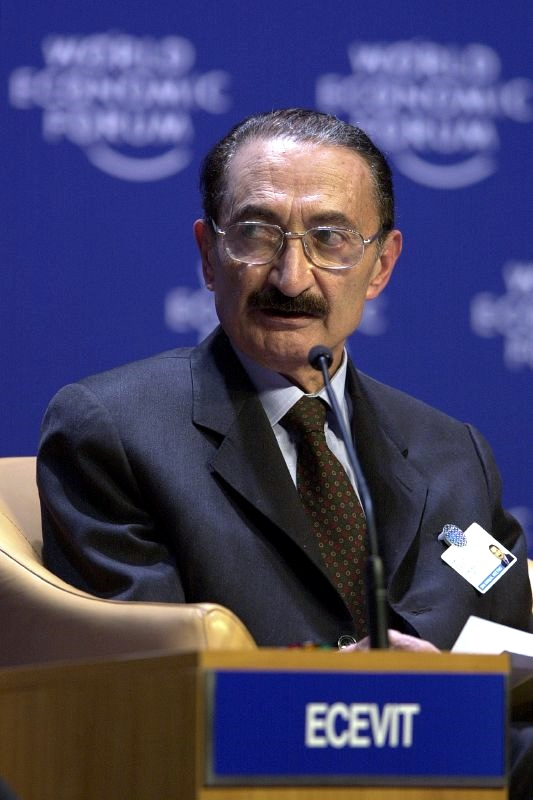
Bülent Ecevit

The 42nd government of Turkey (5 January 1978 – 12 November 1979) was a coalition government of Republican People's Party (CHP) and some independents.

== The elections ==
On the last day of 1977, the 41st government of Turkey came to an end because of vote of no confidence in the interpellation voting. The president asked Bülent Ecevit, the leader of CHP, to form a government. In addition to independents, two one-MP parties, namely Republican Reliance Party (CGP) and Democratic Party (DP), also supported him, and all supporters were given a seat in the government.

== The government ==
In the list below, the serving period of cabinet members who served only a part of the cabinet's lifespan are shown in the column "Notes".

Title	Name	Party	Notes
Prime Minister	Bülent Ecevit	CHP	
Deputy Prime Minister	Orhan Eyüboğlu	CHP	
Deputy Prime Minister	Turhan Feyzioğlu	CGP	5 January 1978 – 18 September 1978
Deputy Prime Minister	Hikmet Çetin	CHP	3 October 1978 – 12 November 1979
Deputy Prime Minister	Faruk Sükan	DP	5 January 1978 – 20 September 1979
Minister of State	Hikmet Çetin	CHP	5 January 1978 – 3 October 1978
Minister of State	Enver Akova	Indep	5 January 1978 – 31 May 1979
Minister of State	Hasan Korkut	Indep	2 June 1979 – 12 November 1979
Minister of State	Lütfi Doğan	CHP	
Minister of State	Salih YILDIZ	CGP	5 January 1978 – 21 June 1979
Minister of State	Ali Rıza SEPTİOĞLU	Indep	5 January 1978 – 18 June 1979
Minister of State	Mustafa KILIÇ	Indep	
Minister of State	Ahmet Şener	CHP	5 January 1978 – 23 October 1979; 8 November 1979 -12.11.1979
Ministry of Justice	Mehmet Can	CHP	
Ministry of National Defense	Hasan Esat Işık; Neşet Akmandor	CHP	5 January 1978 – 16 January 1979; 16 January 1979 – 12 November 1979
Ministry of the Interior	İrfan Özaydınlı; Hasan Fehmi Güneş; Vecdi İlhan	CHP	5 January 1978 – 2 January 1979; 16 January 1979 – 5 October 1979; 8 October 1979 – 12 November 1979
Ministry of Foreign Affairs	Gündüz Ökçün	CHP	
Ministry of Finance	Ziya Müezzinoğlu	CHP	
Ministry of National Education	Necdet Uğur	CHP	
Ministry of Public Works	Şerafettin Elçi	CHP	
Minister of Treasury	Teoman Köprülüler	CHP	
Ministry of Health and Social Security	Mete Tan	Indep	
Ministry of Customs and Monopolies	Tuncay Mataracı	Indep	
Ministry of Food Agriculture and Husbandry	Mehmet Yüceler	CHP	5 January 1978 – 15 October 1979; 30 October 1979 – 12 November 1979
Ministry of Transport	Güneş Öngüt	CHP	
Ministry of Labour	Bahir Ersoy	CHP	
Ministry of Social Security	Hilmi İşgüzar; Salih Yıldız	Indep; CGP	5 January 1978 – 7 June 1979; 21 June 1979 – 12 November 1979
Ministry of Industry	Orhan Alp	Indep	
Ministry of Enterprises	Kenan Bulutoğlu	CHP	
Ministry of Culture	Ahmet Taner Kışlalı	CHP	
Ministry Local Governments	Mahmut Özdemir	CHP	
Ministry of Construction and Settlement	Ahmet Karaslan; Mehmet Yüzele	Indep; CHP	5 January 1978 – 2 October 1979; 15 October 1979 – 30 October 1979
Ministry of Village Affairs and Cooperatives	Ali Topuz	CHP	
Ministry of Forestry	Vecdi İlhan; Ahmet Şener	CHP	5 January 1978 – 8 October 1979; 23 October 1979 – 8 November 1979
Ministry of Youth and Sports	Yüksel Çakmur	CHP	
Ministry of Tourism	Alev Coşkun	CHP	
Ministry of Energy and Natural Resources	Deniz Baykal	CHP	

== Aftermath ==
Senate elections and by-elections held on 14 October 1979 showed that CHP had lost ground to the opposition. Although the government still had the vote of confidence in the parliament, Ecevit resigned, but the government continued until the formation of the 43rd government.

Preceded by 41st government of Turkey (Süleyman Demirel)	42nd Government of Turkey; 5 January 1978 – 12 November 1979	Succeeded by 43rd government of Turkey (Süleyman Demirel)
