= Clive Freeman =

English footballer (1962–2024)

Personal information
- Full name: Clive Richard Freeman
- Date of birth: 12 September 1962
- Place of birth: Leeds, England
- Date of death: 3 September 2024 (aged 61)
- Positions: Left-back; midfielder

Youth career
- 1990: Bridlington Town

Senior career*
Years	Team	Apps	(Gls)
1990–1992	Swansea City	14	(0)
1991–1992	→ Carlisle United (loan)	4	(0)
1992–1993	Altrincham	32	(9)
1993–1994	Doncaster Rovers	25	(2)
- * Club domestic league appearances and goals

Clive Freeman (12 September 1962 – 3 September 2024) was an English footballer who played as a left-sided attacking full-back or midfielder for Swansea City, Carlisle United, Altrincham, and Doncaster Rovers. He later served as a coach and assistant manager at Guiseley A.F.C., Buxton, Ossett Town and Goole A.F.C.

He famously scored the November 1992 BBC Goal of the Month for Altrincham against Chester City F.C. in the second round of the FA Cup, and was noted for his ball striking ability from range and at set pieces.

== Career ==
Freeman started his career in the lower leagues, appearing for Collingham, Farsley Celtic and Doncaster Rovers, before joining Bridlington where he was an FA Vase finalist. He was signed for Swansea by Terry Yorath but was unable to force his way into the team, and so went to Carlisle on loan. After being released by Swansea in the summer of 1992, he attended successful trials at Altrincham where he signed permanently. He was a first team regular in an unfamiliar position of left-back, but made significant contributions to the club with important goals. Despite finishing top scorer he was released, and joined Doncaster Rovers where he stayed for one season. He subsequently returned to non-league football with A.F.C. Emley, Bradford Park Avenue and Guiseley where he was later player-coach, and assistant manager.

== Death ==
Freeman died on 3 September 2024, at the age of 61.

== Sources ==
- Clive Freeman at Post War English & Scottish Football League A–Z Player's Transfer Database
