= Joan Namutaawe =

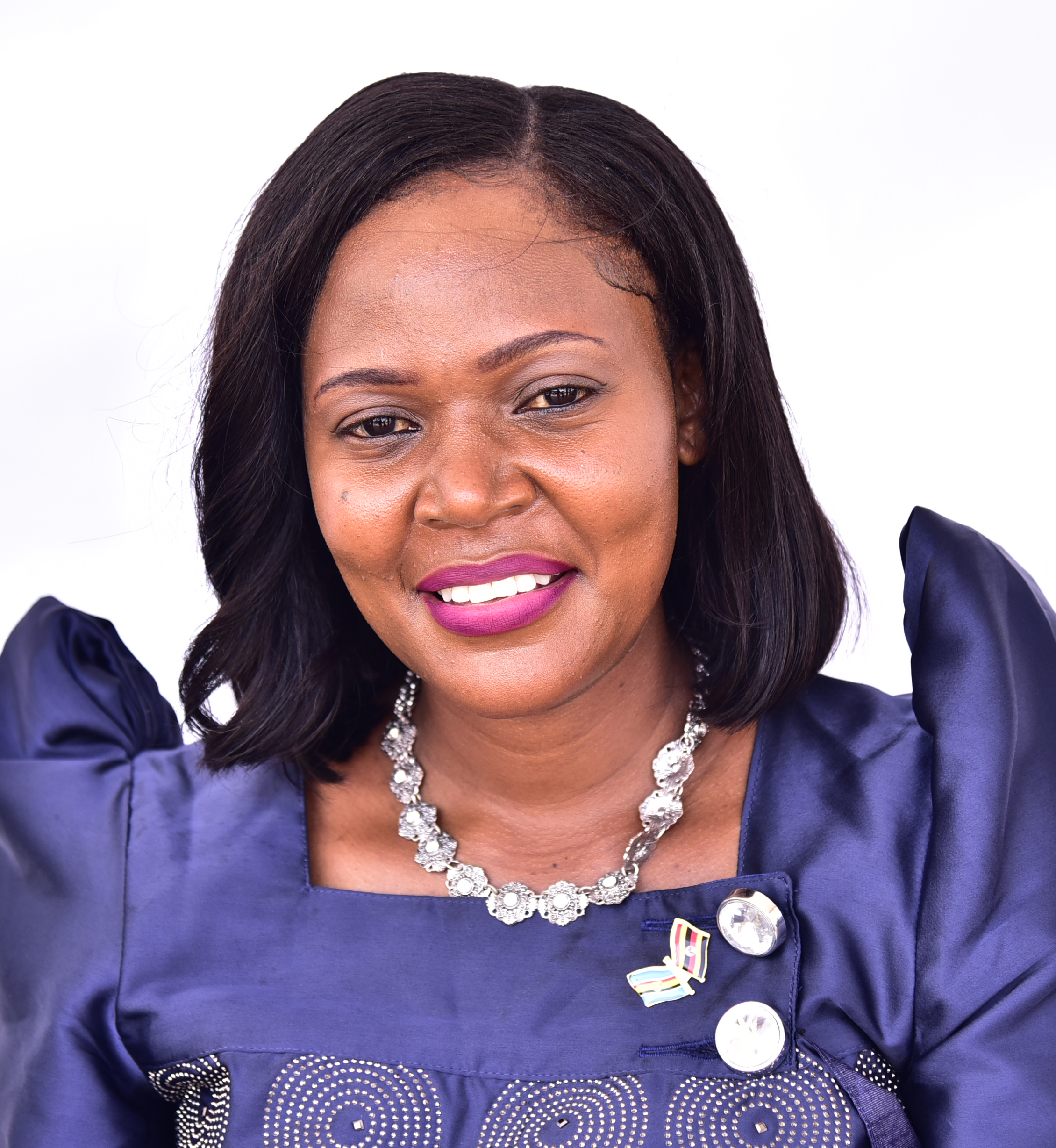
Namutaawe Joan

Joan Namutaawe is a Ugandan politician. She serves as the woman representative for Masaka district in the twelvefth parliament of the Republic of Uganda. she serves on the Committee on Public Service and Local Government. She is a National Unity Platform (NUP) Member of Parliament.

== Political career ==
On 27 April 2023, Namutaawe with 10 female MPs outside the parliament building gate, was arrested and taken to Kampala Central Police station as they marched to the Ministry of Internal Affairs protesting against the arrest of female MPs across the country who had gone to their respective constituents to consult voters on various issues. She has also intervened in land matters in her constituency and brought it to the attention of Parliament to save the affected people evicted in her constituency.

== See also ==
- List of members of the eleventh Parliament of Uganda
- Justine Nameere
- Mathias Mpuga
- Anita Among
- Nobert Mao
- Joel Senyonyi
