= Sazak, Mihalıççık =

Sazak
- Neighbourhood
- Location in Turkey Sazak (Turkey Central Anatolia)
- Coordinates: 39.79040°N 31.61025°E
- Country: Turkey
- Province: Eskişehir
- District: Mihalıççık
- Population (2022): 144
- Time zone: UTC+3 (TRT)
- Postal code: 26940
- Area code: 0222

Sazak is a neighbourhood of the municipality and district of Mihalıççık, Eskişehir Province, Turkey. Its population is 144 (2022).

The village is at 123 km (76 mi) distance to the Province center Eskişehir and is 27 km (17 mi) far from the town Mihalıççık. It is located on the foothills of Sündüken Mountain and on the banks of Porsuk River. Situated on the Eskişehir–Ankara railway, it has Sazak railway station. The village has a primary school.

== Population ==
Historical population
Year	Pop.	±% p.a.
1985	759	—
1990	696	−1.72%
1997	358	−9.06%
2007	180	−6.64%
2012	161	−2.21%
2017	146	−1.94%
2022	144	−0.28%
Source: 1985 census, 1990 census, 1997 census and TÜIK (2007-2022)

== Notable natives ==
- Emin Sazak (1882–1960), landowner and former politician, deputy of Eskişehir Province from Republican People's Party (CHP) and later from Democrat Party (DP). Father of ten children.
- Gün Sazak (1932–1980), son of Emin Sazak, was a nationalist politician and former Minister of Customs and Monopolies, who was assassinated by leftist militans.
- Güven Sazak (1932–2011), son of Emin Sazak, former President of Fenerbahçe SK.
- Yılmaz Sazak (died 2000), son of Emin Sazak, former President of Turkey Athletic Federation.
