= Mountains of the Moon University =

Public university in Uganda

Mountains of the Moon University (MMU)
- Type: Public
- Established: 2005; 21 years ago
- Chancellor: Edward Rugumayo
- Vice-Chancellor: Pius Coxwell Achanga
- Total staff: 170 (2022) 95 vacant (2022)
- Students: 2,450 (2022)
- Location: PO Box 837, Fort Portal, Western Region, Uganda, Fort Portal, Uganda; 00°39′33″N 30°16′31″E
- Campus: Urban
- Website: www.mmu.ac.ug
- Location within Uganda

The Mountains of the Moon University (MMU) is a public university in Uganda. Founded as a private, non-profit institution, it became a public institution following an executive directive in January 2018. It is named after the Rwenzori Mountains, also known as the Mountains of the Moon.

== Location ==
The university is located approximately 1 kilometre (0.62 mi), northeast of the central business district of the city of Fort Portal, Kabarole District, in Western Uganda, approximately 294 kilometres (183 mi), by road, west of Kampala, Uganda's capital city. This location lies in the Kibundaire neighborhood, to the north of the Fort Portal-Mubende Road. The coordinates of the university campus are: 0°39'33.0"N, 30°16'31.0"E (Latitude:0.659167; Longitude:30.275278).

A new campus is under construction at Lake Saaka, approximately 8 kilometres (5.0 mi), northwest of Fort Portal, along Saaka Road. The coordinates of the new campus are:0°41'15.0"N, 30°14'51.0"E (Latitude:0.6875; Longitude:30.2475).

== History ==
After a long planning phase, the Mountains of the Moon University received the official license to become active as a University on March 29, 2005. The license was granted by the Uganda National Council for Higher Education. MMU is a community trust university and a nonprofit organization. The trustees include the local district councils, the three main religious bodies and interested and supportive individuals. It has no specific affiliations.

In January 2018, the president of Uganda directed that both Busoga University and MMU be included on the list of public universities effective in the 2018/2019 academic year. On 1 June 2018, the university was granted a university charter by the Uganda National Council for Higher Education (UNCHE). Consequently, a transition task force (TTF) was set up by the Uganda Ministry of Education and Sports. The TTF consists of experts including Professor John Massa Kasenene, Professor Pius Coxwell Achanga, Dr. Edmond Kagambe and Grace Nyakahuma. These were assigned to coordinate programs and activities to facilitate smooth transition of the university to a public institution.

== Overview ==
MMU was established as a service for the rural communities of Uganda. Courses are structured to develop analytical and applied skills. All students undertake assessed field work during the 'recess term' which is presented using computer based technology at the start of the next semester. All students complete three hours of hands-on computer studies every week. The majority of courses can be taken as either a weekend or an evening option. This is designed to allow students to work and help to pay their way through their courses. The Austrian Service Abroad has been active at the MMU since 2007.

The university has established a Centre for African Developmental Studies, to study, research and create African knowledge and understanding, and suggest how this can be applied to inform development in an African context. MMU's ‘special approach’ will permit new ideas that effectively bridge between local cultures and broader developmental opportunities to be tried and tested, new development models to be synthesized and development competences to be identified and understood in a holistic framework. As well as integrating these ideas with current courses, the centre has established a master's programme, undertaking research and establishing a Cultural and Historical Archive. All these areas of activity have strong potential for partnership between MMU and universities overseas.

== Schools and directorates ==
There are multiple study programmes offered which generally include certificate, diploma and degree options. The academic courses on offer are organised under the following schools:

- School of Health Sciences
- School of Informatics and Computing
- School of Business and Management Studies
- School of Agricultural and Environmental Sciences
- School of Education
- Directorate of Post Graduate Studies and Research

== Public university ==
In September 2021, Parliament approved the takeover of the Mountains of the Moon University by the government. The university commenced full operations as a public university on 1 July 2022. At the time of becoming a public university, MMU has 265 approved staff positions (academic, administrative and support). Of these 170 positions (64 percent) were filled and 95 positions (36 percent) were unfilled, primarily due to lack of suitable applicants. At that time, a total of 2,450 students were registered, 150 of them on government scholarships.

== Notable alumni ==
- Sylvia Rwabogo (b.12 May 1976), Kabarole District Women Representative in the 10th Parliament (2016–2021)

== See also ==
- List of universities in Uganda
- List of business schools in Uganda
