= Victoria Rusoke Businge =

Ugandan politician

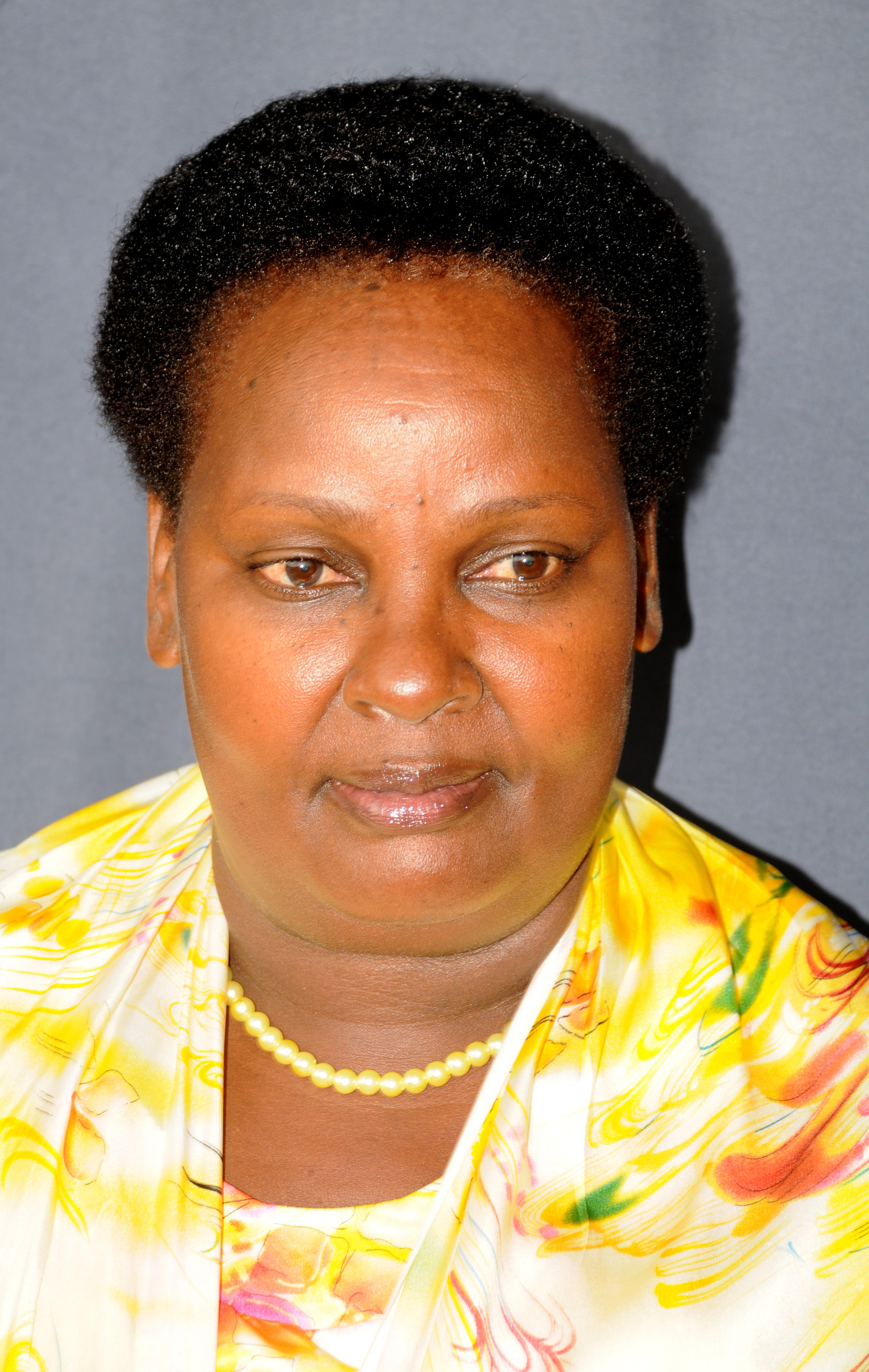
- Born: Rusoke Victoria Businge; 3 January 1956 (age 70)
- Citizenship: Ugandan
- Education: Makerere University; Institute of Teacher Education, Kyambogo
- Occupations: Politician and Teacher
- Employer(s): Kabarole District; Kalinaabiri Primary School; Old Kampala Primary School; City Primary School; Nakasero Primary School; Kibuli TTC; Shimoni Demonstration School; Institute of Teacher Education Kyambogo (ITEK); Kyambogo University; Parliament of Uganda; Uganda Human Rights Commission
- Known for: Politics
- Successor: Sylvia Rwabwo
- Political party: National Resistance Movement (NRM)

Victoria Rusoke Businge also known as Rusoke Victoria Businge (born on 3 January 1956) is a Ugandan politician and teacher. Victoria served as the district Women's Representative of Kabarole District in the ninth Parliament of Uganda. She was re-elected as the member of the eleventh parliament of Uganda in the 2021 January elections. She is affiliated to the National Resistance Movement. In 2018, she was appointed and sworn in as the new member of the Uganda Human Rights Commission (UHRC) by the Chief Justice, Hon. Justice Bart M. Katureebe at the Judiciary headquarters in Kampala.

== Education and background ==
She holds a Master of Education from Makerere University (2001) and attained a Bachelor of Education from Makerere University in 1991. She holds a Diploma in teacher education from Institute of Teacher Education, Kyambogo (1986), Grade II teacher certificate, Makerere University (1980), and in 1977, she was awarded an East African certificate of education.

Victoria's mother could not afford to educate her beyond O-level and hence she was unable to attain her dream of becoming a lawyer and instead became a teacher.

== Career ==
She served as the District Education Officer, Kabarole from 2003 to 2010. From February to July 2003, she worked as the head teacher at Kalinaabiri Primary School and also served as the head teacher of Old Kampala Primary School from 1997 to 2002. She was the head teacher of City Primary School from 1994 to 1995. She was employed as the deputy head teacher of Nakasero Primary School from 1991 to 1993 and as a tutor at Kibuli TTC from 1986 to 1990. She served as a teacher at Shimoni Demonstration School from 1980 to 1985. In 1978, she joined and served at the Institute of Teacher Education Kyambogo (ITEK) which is now Kyambogo University.

She served on the Parliament's committee on Tourism, Trade and Industry and on the Appointments Committee.

== Controversy ==
In 2016, she lost to the incumbent Sylvia Rwabwo in the National Resistance Movement (NRM) primaries. She went ahead and contested as an Independent political candidate but she lost. When she lost to Sylvia Rwabwo, she remained unemployed until she was appointed as the Commissioner at the Uganda Human Rights Commission. In 2021, she contested again for Kabarole District Woman Member of Parliament and won although she has been alleged for using government resources such as government vehicle and other resources doing door to door campaigns as the Commissioner at the Uganda Human Rights Commission to further her political ambitions. It has been said her involvement in politics as a Commissioner is against Clause 54 of the Constitution of the Republic of Uganda which requires a Commissioner to be Independent, and not involved in partisan politics.

== See also ==
- List of members of the eleventh Parliament of Uganda
- List of members of the ninth Parliament of Uganda
- Parliament of Uganda
- Kabarole District
- Sylvia Rwabogo
- Uganda Human Rights Commission
