= Hilmi İşgüzar =

Turkish politician (1929–2019)

Minister of Social Security
- In office January 5, 1978 – June 7, 1979
- Prime Minister: Bülent Ecevit
- Succeeded by: Mehmet Salih Yıldız

Personal details
- Born: 1929 Yozgat, Turkey
- Died: 2 June 2019 (aged 89–90)
- Party: Justice Party (AP)
- Children: 2
- Education: Ankara University; Nancy-Université

Hilmi İşgüzar (1929 – 2 June 2019) was a Turkish politician and government minister.

== Early life ==
Hilmi İşgüzar was born to Mehmet İşgüzar and his wife Havva in 1929. He was educated in Forestry and Law at Ankara University. He earned a master's degree from the School of Forestry and Water at Nancy-Université in France.

İşgüzar worked as a lawyer before he entered politics.

== Politics career ==
Hilmi İşgüzar joined Nation Party (MP) led by Osman Bölükbaşı and elected in the 1965 general election into the parliament representing Sinop Province. In the 1977 general election , he entered the parliament as deputy of Sinop Province from Justice Party (AP).

In December 1977, he left Justice Party along with eleven party members to enter the coalition cabinet of Bülent Ecevit as Minister of Social Security on January 5, 1978. Following allegations of corruption and a motion of no confidence against him accepted in the parliament, he resigned on June 7, 1979.

After the 1980 Turkish coup d'état, he was accused of damaging the state social security corporations Sosyal Sigortalar Kurumu and Bağkur through corruption in office by nepotism, fraud, bestowing privilege, influence peddling, misfeasance and affording advantage. On February 2, 1981, the military junta sent him and 54 co-workers before the Constitutional Court of Turkey (Turkish: Yüce Divan) for trial. The trial lasted from March 26, 1981 to April 12, 1982. The supreme court convicted Hilmi İşgüzar on April 13, 1982, to nine years and eight months in prison, of which five years in penal servitude, fined to 5,251,600 Turkish lira and banned from employment by state. He served his sentence in Burdur Prison until his release in 1985. Later, his ban of employment in state service was lifted, and the properties belonging to his children were released, which were hypothecated as security for his fine.

== Personal life and death ==
İşgüzar was married. His wife became paralyzed when the supreme court sentenced him. The couple had a son and a daughter. His son, Hasan İşgüzar, is an academic at Ankara University Law Faculty.

Hilmi İşgüzar died on 2 June 2019.

Political offices
Preceded by	Minister of Social Security; January 5, 1978 - June 7, 1979	Succeeded by Mehmet Salih Yıldız
