= Tuncay =

Tuncay (pronounced [ˈtundʒaj]; toonj-eye) is a Turkish given name for males and a surname. People named Tuncay include:

== Given name ==
- Tuncay Güney (born 1972), Turkish spy
- Tuncay Karakaya (born 1989), Turkish Paralympian goalball player
- Tuncay Mataracı (1935–2020), convicted former government minister of Turkey
- Tuncay Özilhan (born 1947), Turkish businessman
- Tuncay Özkan (born 1966), Turkish journalist, writer and politician
- Tuncay Şanlı (born 1982), Turkish footballer

== Surname ==
- Ekin Tunçay Turan, Turkish stage actress and translator
- Fevzi Tuncay (born 1977), Turkish footballer
