= Ministries of the Ottoman Empire =

This is a list of ministries of the Ottoman Empire. Each ministry was headed by a minister, appointed by the head of cabinet, the Grand Vizier. The Grand Vizier would gradually gain equivalent Prime ministerial powers during the Tanzimat, First Constitutional, and Second Constitutional Eras. He was appointed by the Sultan, who had presidential powers.

- Grand Vizier (Prime Minister)
- Ministry of the Cadastre
- Ministry of Documents
- Ministry of Education
- Ministry of Evkaf
- Ministry of Finance
- Ministry of Foreign Affairs
- Ministry of the Gendarmerie
- Ministry of the Interior
- Ministry of Justice
- Ministry of Navy
- Ministry of the Private Treasury
- Ministry of Post and Telegraph
- Ministry of Public Works
- Ministry of Trade and Agriculture
- Ministry of War
- Ministry of Sharia and the Foundations

== See also ==
- Ministries of Turkey
