= Pius Coxwell Achanga =

Ugandan academic administrator

- Born: Pius Coxwell Achanga
- Citizenship: Ugandan
- Education: University of Hull; Cranfield University; Canterbury Christ Church University
- Known for: Management of Mountains of the Moon University
- Title: Vice chancellor of Mountains of the Moon University since 2022.
- Scientific career
- Fields: Manufacturing processes Business information technology Higher education management
- Institutions: University of Cambridge; Uganda National Council for Higher Education; Mountains of the Moon University

Pius Coxwell Achanga is a management professional, industrial scientist and academic administrator in Uganda. Since 4 October 2022, he has been the substantive vice chancellor of the Mountains of the Moon University (MMU), the tenth public university in the country at that time.

== Background and education ==
Achanga is a Ugandan national. His first degree, a Bachelor of Business Information Technology (BBIT), was awarded by the University of Hull in the United Kingdom (UK). His degree of Master of Science (MSc), in Manufacturing Management and Information Systems, was obtained from the Cranfield University, also in the UK. He went on to obtain a Doctor of Philosophy (PhD) degree in Manufacturing Systems, awarded by Cranfield University as well.

== Career ==
Achanga worked as a research associate at the Institute for Manufacturing (IfM), in the School of Engineering at the University of Cambridge in the UK. He was then hired by the Uganda National Council for Higher Education (UNCHE), rising to the position of head of Institutional and Programme Accreditation (IPA). From 25 January 2019 until 4 October 2022, he served as the chairman of the four-person Task Force Committee, established by the Cabinet Minister of Education and Sports to oversee the transition of MMU from a private university to a public institution. On 3 October 2022, he was appointed as the substantive vice chancellor of MMU, becoming the first vice chancellor of the university since it became a public institution.

== Research ==
Achanga has participated in academic research. He has authored and co-authored journal articles including "Managing and Leading African Universities", "Development of an impact assessment framework for lean manufacturing within SMEs", and "Higher Education Systems and Institutions: Uganda".

== See also ==
- List of university leaders in Uganda
