= Cadastre Bureau (Ottoman Empire) =

Imperial ministry of the Ottoman Empire

The Cadastre Bureau (Ottoman Turkish: Defter-Khané, Turkish: Tahrir-i Emlak Nezareti,) was an Ottoman Empire agency. The bureau served as a land registry (or cadastre of real estate), but did not classify any land themselves. George Young, author of Corps de droit ottoman, wrote that the common French translation was "Bureau de Cadastre", but he labeled it as the Ministry of the Cadastre (French: Ministère de Cadastre). The agency appeared upon the end of the Crimean War.
