= Mihalıççık =

- District and municipality
- Map showing Mihalıççık District in Eskişehir Province

- Location in Turkey Mihalıççık (Turkey Central Anatolia)
- Coordinates: 39°51′51″N 31°29′43″E
- Country: Turkey
- Province: Eskişehir

Government
  - Mayor: Haydar Çorum (DSP)
- Area: 1,809 km^{2} (698 sq mi)
- Elevation: 1,305 m (4,281 ft)
- Population (2022): 7,659
  - Density: 4.234/km^{2} (10.97/sq mi)
- Time zone: UTC+3 (TRT)
- Postal code: 26940
- Area code: 0222
- Website: www.mihaliccik.bel.tr

Mihalıççık, also Mihalıçcık (English: Micalizo, sometimes Mihaliccik), is a municipality and district of Eskişehir Province, Turkey. Its area is 1,809 km^{2}, and its population is 7,659 (2022). The elevation is 1,305 m (4,281 ft).

== Composition ==
There are 53 neighbourhoods in Mihalıççık District:

- Adahisar
- Ahur
- Ahurözü
- Akçaören
- Aydınlar
- Bahtiyar
- Belen
- Beyköy
- Çalçı
- Çalkaya
- Camikebir
- Çardak
- Çukurören
- Dağcı
- Diközü
- Dinek
- Dümrek
- Gözeler
- Güce
- Güreş
- Gürleyik
- Hamidiye
- İğdecik
- İkizafer
- Ilıcalar
- Karaçam
- Karageyikli
- Kavak
- Kayı
- Kızılbörüklü
- Korucu
- Koyunağılı
- Kozlu
- Lütfiye
- Mahmuthisar
- Medrese
- Narlı
- Obruk
- Ömer
- Otluk
- Saray
- Sazak
- Seki
- Sekiören
- Sorkun
- Süleler
- Tatarcık
- Üçbaşlı
- Uşakbükü
- Yalımkaya
- Yayla
- Yeşilyurt
- Yunusemre

== See also ==
- Gökçekaya Dam
