= Raphael Magyezi =

Ugandan MP and minister

Member of Parliament of the Uganda
- Incumbent
- Assumed office 2011
- Constituency: Igara County West, Bushenyi District

Minister for Local Government
- Incumbent
- Assumed office 2020

Personal details
- Born: 27 July 1960 (age 65) Bushenyi District, Uganda
- Party: NRM
- Profession: Economist

Raphael Magyezi (born July 27, 1960) is an Ugandan politician who has served as the Member of Parliament for Igara West since 2011. In 2019, he was appointed Minister for Local Government in the Cabinet of Uganda by President Yoweri Museveni.

== Early life and education ==
Magyezi was born on 27 July 1960. He attended Diploma Katigondo Seminary for Religious Studies in 1983. He earned a BSc in Philosophy from the Urban University of Rome in 1984 and National College of Business Studies, Nakawa for Business studies in 1990. He attended Makerere University in 1992 for BSc in Statistics, earning a Certificate in Human Resource Management in 1996. He completed his M.A in Economic and Management from the Makerere University in 1998. In 2004 he went for a diploma course at Diploma Kristiansand College Norway in Local Government Management studies.

== Career ==
He worked as a statistician planner in Mukono District Local Government from 1991 to 1996. He was Senior Economist Ministry of Local Government from 1997 to 1998 and Secretary General of the Uganda Local Governments Association from 1998 to 2010. He joined the Parliament in 2010 and was appointed Minister of Local Government in 2020.

=== 2017 private members bill ===
He is best known for the introduction of a Private Member Bill for amendments to the Uganda constitution to lift the Presidential age limit after sponsoring the Private Members Bill in 2017.

The bill was tabled by Raphael. The bill amended article 102(b) of the Constitution setting a Presidential age limit of 75 years. After the Legal Committee for consideration approved the bill, the Constitutional Court upheld the amendment, enacted by Amendment No. 2 Act of 2017. The constitutional amendment led the President to appoint him as the Local Government minister in 2019 in appreciation.

A poll found 85% opposed to the change. The poll sampled more than 50,000 citizens in 100 constituencies, numbering 27,503 males and 22,926 females. The Eastern region opposition was about 95% and the North 86%, and 76% came from the Western region. In the Central unit about 66% expressed opposition.

=== 2021 elections ===
Magyezi declared not to contest for 2021 elections, telling the Uganda Radio Network that after 10 years as a member of Parliament, he announced to take a rest from politics but could return in the future. Magyezi did not give a definite reason for taking a break.
