= Tuncay Mataracı =

Turkish politician (1935–2020)

Minister of Customs and Monopolies
- In office 5 January 1978 – 12 November 1979
- Prime Minister: Bülent Ecevit
- Preceded by: Gün Sazak
- Succeeded by: Ahmet Çakmak

Personal details
- Born: 2 February 1935 Rize, Turkey
- Died: 17 December 2020 (aged 85) Istanbul
- Cause of death: COVID-19
- Resting place: Zincirlikuyu Cemetery
- Party: Justice Party
- Occupation: Politician
- Profession: Civil engineer
- Cabinet: 42nd government of Turkey

Tuncay Mataracı (2 February 1935 – 17 December 2020) was a Turkish politician and government minister.

== Early life and education ==
Tuncay Mataracı was born on 2 February 1935 in Rize, Turkey. His father is Mehmet Tevfik Mataracı. He finished his primary and secondary education in his hometown. After graduating from high school in Trabzon, Mataracı started to study law at the university. However, he dropped out and discontinued his education after a while. He then studied at a civil engineering college, and obtained a certificate as a construction technician.

Mataracı served as manager of Village Public Works Services in Rize Province before he became an executive of the Tea Planters' Cooperation and later head of Province Physical Education Directorate.

== Politician career ==
Tuncay Mataracı entered politics and was elected deputy of Rize Province from Justice Party at the 1977 general election. With the forming of a coalition cabinet by Bülent Ecevit, he was appointed Minister of Customs and Monopolies in the 42nd government on January 5, 1978.

Responsible also for state monopoly of tea trade in Turkey and proficient in tea processing from his former employment, Mataracı changed the tea leaf picking policy which was rigorously enforced. The picking of tea leaves was allowed to be done only by hand in Turkey in order to achieve a good quality tea product. However, hand picking did not allow reasonable profit for the tea planters in Rize due to the high labor costs. Mataracı lifted the ban on tea leaf picking by tool, and this was much welcomed in his hometown.

On 12 November 1979, the cabinet dissolved and Mataracı's term as a minister ended.

== Conviction ==
On 27 April 1981, the National Security Council (Turkish: Milli Güvenlik Kurulu, MGK), the military junta, which had staged the 1980 military coup on 12 September put Tuncay Mataracı on trial at the Supreme Court (Turkish: Yüce Divan). The trial began on 15 June 1981. Mataracı was accused of bribery and abuse of power during his office term as government minister along with 21 co-defendants, among them former Minister of Public Works, Şerafettin Elçi, and a mobster, Abuzer Uğurlu. On 16 March 1982, the Supreme Court sentenced Mataracı to 36 years of aggravated imprisonment, a fine of ₺787,386,166 Turkish lira, life banishment from government office and driver's license revocation for six-years. Of the co-defendants, only Şerafettin Elçi was acquitted while all others were convicted to various terms of imprisonment between ten months and six years. Mataracı's punishment was the most severe of any government minister in Turkey.

Mataracı was incarcerated in Kayseri Prison. Upon the Law #4616 on Parole enacted in 1991, he was released from the prison. The high amount of fine, which he did not pay in the beginning vanished into thin air. When he paid the fine in 1993, it had lost value due to high inflation rate.

In an interview made with a local daily in Rize in March 2013, he stated that he is the only banned politician left, and the ban would terminate at the end of 2013.

== Death ==
Mataracı died from COVID-19 in Istanbul, on 17 December 2020, during the COVID-19 pandemic in Turkey. He was interred at Zincirlikuyu Cemetery the next day.
