= Ministry of Local Government and Rural Development =

Ministry of Local Government and Rural Development may refer to:

- Ministry of Local Government, Rural Development and Co-operatives (Bangladesh)
- Ministry of Local Government and Rural Development (Botswana)
- Ministry of Local Government and Rural Development (Ghana)
- Ministry of Local Government and Rural Development (Sierra Leone)
- Ministry of Local Government and Rural Development (Zambia)
