= Rose Nalubowa =

- Citizenship: Uganda
- Occupations: Educator, politician
- Political party: National Unity Platform

Rose Nalubowa is a Ugandan educator and politician who contested for the Woman MP of Masaka City in the 2026 general elections under the National Unity Platform. She is a former deputy of Buddu county chief (Pookino).

== Early life and education ==
Nalubowa holds a bachelor's degree in Education, Democracy and Development Studies, and a postgraduate diploma in Human Resource Management.

== Career ==
Nalubowa was the secretary for education in Rakai district education service commission and a member of St. Bernard board of governors. She was the chairperson of Kyotera District Service Commission between 2018 and 2024, and the coordinator of the Education and Social Services at the Masaka Diocesan Laity Commission. The Inspectorate General of Government advised the Public Service Commission to reject her reappointment for a second term which caused her to seek justice from the High Court, which ruled in her favor and ordered the IGG to compensate her with 150 million shillings.

She was the National Unity Platform's candidate for the Masaka City Woman Member of Parliament race in the 2026 general elections. She was declared a winner, a decision which was overturned by Masaka Chief Magistrate Abert Asiimwe, who announced her rival, Justine Nameere, after a controversial vote recount. She filed a petition to the High Court through her lawyers, seeking the nullification of Asiimwe's order for a vote recount, which led to the nullification of her victory.
