= Sylvia Rwabogo =

Ugandan politician

Sylvia Rwabwogo
- Born: 12 May 1976 (age 50); Fort Portal, Uganda
- Citizenship: Uganda
- Education: Mountains of the Moon University (BA in Social and Community Development); Uganda Management Institute (Diploma in Journalism and Media Management) (Certificate in Project Planning and Management); Makerere University (Certificate in Computer Science)
- Occupations: Journalist & Politician
- Years active: 1997 – present
- Known for: Politics
- Title: Member of Parliament; Parliament of Uganda
- Spouse: N/A

Sylvia Rwabwogo (born 12 May 1976) is a Ugandan journalist and politician, who served as the District Woman Representative for Kabarole District, in the 10th Parliament (2016–2021), in the Parliament of Uganda.

== Background and education ==
She was born in Kabarole District on 12 May 1976. She attended Ugandan schools until she graduated Senior 4 in 1994. She went on to obtain a certificate in Project Planning and Management from Makerere University, in 1998. She followed that with a certificate in computer science, obtained in 2000, also from Makerere University. In 2002, she graduated with a Diploma in Journalism and Media Management, from the Uganda Management Institute, in Kampala, the capital and largest city in Uganda. She also has a Bachelor of Arts degree, awarded by the Mountains of the Moon University, in Fort Portal, in the Western Region of Uganda. She is a member of the Anglican Church of Uganda.

== Career before politics ==
Rwabogo started her career in 1997, working as a community programme officer for women and child development. She then worked as a community trainer for a non-profit organisation called Africa Media Alliance, serving in that capacity until 2000. For one year, she worked as an intern news-reporter for the New Vision newspaper.

For the next thirteen years, until 2015, she worked in various capacities with several radio stations, including (a) Voice of Toro (b) Better FM and (c) Hits FM.

== Political career ==
Beginning in 2006, for the next ten years, Sylvia Rwabogo worked as a member of the Kabarole District Administration, including as the Secretary General of Kabarole District Council for seven years, as a District Councillor for five years, as the District Deputy Speaker for another five years; with some roles overlapping in time.

In 2016, she won the Kabarole Women Representative constituency on the National Resistance Movement political party ticket.

During the 2017 parliamentary debate about removing the age-limit restrictions from the Ugandan Constitution, Rwabogo was a vocal opponent of the age amendment.

== Controversy ==
Beginning in November 2017, Sylvia Rwabogo began receiving unsolicited telephone calls and SMS messages from someone, whom the MP first mistook for a constituent. Later, the phone calls became romantic, and when she blocked her tormentor's phone number, her tormentor turned to text messages.

When the unwanted messages persisted, Ms. Rwabogo, who is single, reported the matter to the police, who laid a trap for the arrest of the harasser. The culprit turned out to be a 25-year-old male college student, who admitted to sending the offensive communication. He was promptly found guilty, and sentenced to two years behind bars.

== Other responsibilities ==
Sylvia Rwabogo is a member of the parliamentary committee on HIV/AIDS and related diseases. She also concurrently serves on the parliamentary committee on agriculture.

== See also ==
- Parliament of Uganda
- Kabarole District
