= Çorum massacre =

Massacre of Alevi Turks in Turkey in 1980

- Location: Çorum, Turkey
- Date: May–July 1980
- Target: Alevis
- Deaths: 57
- Injuries: 100+

The Çorum pogrom or Çorum massacres occurred in the province of Çorum in north-central Turkey between May and July 1980. Turkist ultranationalists targeted the Alevi minority which led to as many as 57 deaths and over 200 injuries in the ensuing violence. Another target was the social-democratic Republican People's Party (CHP). Many victims were young people and women.

In 2012 "former rightist agitator" Adnan Baran stated that uncertainty remains about the exact nature of the events and urged that a dialogue between the rightists and leftists take place in order to better understand the events, which he speculated might have been part of a larger military plan to set up a pretext for the Sept. 12, 1980 coup d'état.

== See also ==
- Sivas massacre
- Maraş Massacre
- 1995 Gazi Quarter riots
- Istanbul pogroms
- List of massacres in Turkey
