= Ministry of Enterprises (Turkey) =

Turkish institution

Ministry of Enterprises was a former Turkish government ministry.

Ministry of Enterprises was the former name of the Ministry of Science, Industry and Technology between 10 June 1948 to 2 September 1957.

However, in the 42nd government of Turkey, a separate ministry was established by the name of Ministry of Enterprises along with the Ministry of Industry on 5 January 1978. While the Ministry of Industry was responsible in the industry and technology in Turkey, the Ministry of Enterprises would be responsible in state-owned complexes. However, during the formation of the next government, the Ministry of Enterprises was merged to the Ministry of Industry on 12 November 1979.

== The minister of enterprises (1978-1979) ==
Name of the minister	Party	Duration
Kenan Bulutoğlu	Republican People's Party	5 January 1978 – 12 November 1979
