= Ministry of Local Governments (Turkey) =

Ministry of Local Governments (Turkish: Yerel Yönetimler Bakanlığı) was a former government ministry of Turkey.

The municipalities and the other local offices such as province governorships of Turkey are in the responsibility of the Minister of Interior. During the formation of the 42nd government of Turkey on 5 January 1978, the Ministry of the Local Governments was established for the coordination of the local governments. But it was a short-lived ministry and during the formation of the 43rd government of Turkey on the 12 November 1979, it was abolished and the responsibility of the local governments was retransferred to the Ministry of Interior.

== Minister ==
Name of the minister	Party	Duration
Mahmut Özdemir	Republican People's Party	5 January 1978-12 November 1979
