= Güven Sazak =

Turkis businessman (1935-2011)

- Born: 1935
- Died: 2011 (aged 75–76)
- Occupation: Businessman

Güven Sazak (1935 in Ankara, Turkey – 25 April 2011) was the 40th President of Türkiye Süper Ligi club Fenerbahçe SK between 1993 and 1994. He has been a member of the club since 1958.

He was also a member of the Fenerbahçe SK Board in 1974–75, 1978–80 and 1982–83 Boards.

Güven Sazak is the brother of Gün Sazak (1932–1980), a nationalist politician and former Minister of Customs and Monopolies, who was assassinated by leftist militants. His other brother, Yılmaz Sazak, served as the President of the Turkey Athletic Federation.
