= Ministry of Local Government (Uganda) =

Government ministry of Uganda

Coordinates: 00°18′49″N 32°34′57″E

- Coat of Arms of Uganda

Ministry overview
- Type: Ministry
- Jurisdiction: Government of Uganda
- Headquarters: Workers House; Pilkington Road; Kampala, Uganda
- Minister responsible: Balaam Barugahara
- Deputy Minister responsible: Justine Nameere
- Website: Homepage

The Ministry of Local Government (MOLG) is a cabinet-level government ministry of Uganda. It is responsible for the "creation, supervision and guidance of sustainable, efficient and effective service delivery in the decentralized system of governance. The ministry is responsible for the harmonization and support of all local government functions, to cause positive socio-economic transformation of Uganda". The ministry is headed by a cabinet minister, currently Balaam Barugahara.

== Location ==
The headquarters of the ministry are located on the 4th Floor of Workers House, on Pilkington Avenue, in the Central Division of Kampala, Uganda's capital and largest city. The coordinates of the ministry headquarters are 0°18'49.0"N, 32°34'57.0"E (Latitude:0.313611; Longitude:32.582500).

== Subministries ==
The minister is assisted by a Minister of State, currently JustineNameere.

== Organisational structure ==
Administratively, the ministry is divided into the following directorates and departments.

1. Directorate of Local Government Inspection

- Department of District Inspection
- Department of Urban Inspection

2. Directorate of Local Government Administration

- Department of District Administration
- Department of Local Councils Development
- Department of Urban Administration
- Department of Finance and Administration

== List of ministers ==
- Balaam Barugahara (26 May 2026 - Present)
- Raphael Magyezi (14 December 2019 - present)
- Tom Butime (6 June 2016 - 14 December 2019)
- Adolf Mwesige (16 February 2009 - 6 June 2016)
- Tarsis Kabwegyere ( - 16 February 2009)

== See also ==
- Politics of Uganda
- Cabinet of Uganda
- Parliament of Uganda
