= List of ministers of national education of Turkey =

Following is a list of ministers of national education of Turkey.

#	Name	Took office	Left office
1	Rıza Nur	4 May 1920	13 December 1920
2	Hamdullah Suphi Tanrıöver	14 December 1920	20 November 1921
3	Mehmet Vehbi Bolak	20 November 1921	5 November 1922
4	İsmail Safa Özler	5 November 1922	6 March 1924
5	Hüseyin Vasıf Çınar	6 March 1924	22 November 1924
6	Şükrü Saraçoğlu	22 November 1924	3 March 1925
7	Hamdullah Suphi Tanrıöver	3 March 1925	19 December 1925
8	Mustafa Necati Uğural	20 December 1925	1 January 1929
9	İsmet İnönü (placeholder)	1 January 1929	8 January 1929
10	İsmet İnönü	9 January 1929	27 February 1929
11	Hüseyin Vasıf Çınar	28 February 1929	7 April 1929
12	Recep Peker (placeholder)	7 April 1929	10 April 1929
13	Cemal Hüsnü Taray	10 April 1929	15 September 1930
14	Refik Saydam (placeholder)	17 September 1930	27 September 1930
15	Esat Sagay	27 September 1930	18 September 1932
16	Reşit Galip	19 September 1932	13 August 1933
17	Refik Saydam (placeholder)	13 August 1933	26 October 1933
18	Yusuf Hikmet Bayur	27 October 1933	8 July 1934
19	Zeynel Abidin Özmen	9 July 1934	9 June 1935
20	Saffet Arıkan	10 June 1935	9 June 1935
21	Hasan Âli Yücel	28 December 1938	5 August 1946
22	Reşat Şemsettin Sirer	5 August 1946	9 June 1948
23	Hasan Tahsin Banguoğlu	10 June 1948	22 May 1950
24	Hüseyin Avni Başman	22 May 1950	2 August 1950
25	Nuri Özsan (placeholder)	3 August 1950	10 August 1950
26	Ahmet Tevfik İleri	11 August 1950	5 April 1953
27	Rıfkı Salim Burçak	9 April 1953	17 May 1954
28	Celal Yardımcı	17 May 1954	9 December 1955
29	Ahmet Özel	9 December 1955	13 April 1957
30	Ahmet Tevfik İleri	13 April 1957	25 November 1957
31	Celal Yardımcı	26 November 1957	22 May 1959
32	Ahmet Tevfik İleri (placeholder)	22 May 1959	8 December 1959
33	Mehmet Atıf Benderlioğlu	9 December 1959	27 May 1960
34	Fehmi Yavuz	30 May 1960	27 August 1960
35	Fehmi Yavuz (placeholder)	27 August 1960	8 September 1960
36	Bedrettin Tuncel	8 September 1960	5 January 1961
37	Turhan Feyzioğlu	5 January 1961	7 February 1961
38	Ahmet Tahtakılıç (placeholder)	7 February 1961	2 March 1961
39	Ahmet Tahtakılıç	3 March 1961	25 October 1961
40	Ahmet Tahtakılıç (placeholder)	25 October 1961	20 November 1961
41	Mehmet Hilmi İncesulu	20 November 1961	25 June 1962
42	Şevket Raşit Hatipoğlu	25 June 1962	8 June 1963
43	İbrahim Öktem	11 June 1963	20 February 1965
44	Cihat Bilgehan	20 February 1965	27 October 1965
45	Orhan Dengiz	27 October 1965	1 April 1967
46	Mehmet İlhami Ertem	1 April 1967	3 November 1969
47	Orhan Oğuz	3 November 1969	26 March 1971
48	Şinasi Orel	26 March 1971	13 December 1971
49	İsmail Hakkı Arar	13 December 1971	22 May 1972
50	Sabahattin Özbek	22 May 1972	15 April 1973
51	Orhan Dengiz	15 April 1973	26 January 1974
52	Mustafa Üstündağ	26 January 1974	17 November 1974
53	Safa Reisoğlu	17 November 1974	31 March 1975
54	Ali Naili Erdem	31 March 1975	21 June 1977
55	Mustafa Üstündağ	21 June 1977	21 July 1977
56	Nahit Menteşe	21 July 1977	5 January 1978
57	Mustafa Necdet Uğur	5 January 1978	12 November 1979
58	Orhan Cemal Fersoy	12 November 1979	12 September 1980
59	Hasan Sağlam	21 September 1980	13 December 1983
60	Vehbi Dinçerler	13 December 1983	13 September 1985
61	Metin Emiroğlu	13 September 1985	21 December 1987
62	Hasan Celal Güzel	21 December 1987	30 March 1989
63	Avni Akyol	30 March 1989	20 November 1991
64	Köksal Toptan	20 November 1991	25 June 1993
65	Nahit Menteşe	25 June 1993	24 October 1993
66	Nevzat Ayaz	24 October 1993	5 October 1995
67	Turhan Tayan	5 October 1995	28 June 1996
68	Mehmet Sağlam	28 June 1996	30 June 1997
69	Hikmet Uluğbay	30 June 1997	11 January 1999
70	Metin Bostancıoğlu	11 January 1999	10 July 2002
71	Necdet Tekin	10 July 2002	18 November 2002
72	Erkan Mumcu	18 November 2002	14 March 2003
73	Hüseyin Çelik	14 March 2003	1 May 2009
74	Nimet Çubukçu	1 May 2009	6 July 2011
75	Ömer Dinçer	6 July 2011	24 January 2013
76	Nabi Avcı	24 January 2013	24 May 2016
77	İsmet Yılmaz	24 May 2016	10 July 2018
78	Ziya Selçuk	10 July 2018	6 August 2021
79	Mahmut Özer	6 August 2021	4 June 2023
80	Yusuf Tekin	4 June 2023	Incumbent
