= Ali Topuz =

Turkish politician and architect (1932–2019)

Personal details
- Born: 1932 Çayeli, Rize, Turkey
- Died: 14 October 2019 (aged 86–87) Istanbul, Turkey
- Resting place: Istanbul, Turkey
- Party: Republican People's Party (until 12 September 1980)
- Other political affiliations: Social Democratic Populist Party
- Children: 2
- Education: Istanbul Technical University

Ali Topuz (1932–2019) was a Turkish architect and social democratic politician who held several cabinet posts in the late 1970s. He was member of the Republican People's Party (CHP) and served at the Parliament.

== Early life and education ==
Topuz was born in Çayeli, Rize, in 1932. He received a degree in architecture from Istanbul Technical University.

== Career and activities ==
Following his graduation Topuz worked at various institutions as an architect, including Istanbul Municipality, and also as a freelance architect. He was a member of the central executive committee and vice president of the Chamber of Architects between 1969 and 1971.

Topuz became a member of the CHP and headed a faction consisted of those party members from the Black Sea region. The group included Aytekin Kotil, Necdet Uğur, Orhan Eyüpoğlu, Tarhan Erdem and other leading figures who were the earliest supporter of Bülent Ecevit against İsmet İnönü in the election of the CHP chairmanship in 1972. Topuz and Kotil were ardent followers of Bülent Ecevit's left of center movement. Topuz served as the head of CHP's Istanbul branch until 1973 when he was elected as a deputy. He was re-elected as a deputy from Istanbul in the 1977 general election.

Topuz was appointed minister of village affairs and cooperatives to the cabinet led by Prime Minister Bülent Ecevit on 21 June 1977. However, his tenure was very brief and ended on 27 July. Because the cabinet could not get a vote of confidence at the Parliament on 3 July. Topuz was again named as the minister of village affairs and cooperatives on 5 January 1978 serving in the next cabinet of Ecevit until 1979.

His political activity temporarily ended due to the military coup in 1980. Topuz was elected to the Parliament in the general election in 1987 from the Social Democratic Populist Party. Topuz and Aytekin Kotil supported the leadership of Deniz Baykal against Erdal İnönü in the party. Topuz joined the CHP in 1992 when it was reestablished. He was reelected as the head of CHP's Istanbul branch in 2000.

Topuz was a member of the Parliament for the CHP until 2007. During his last term at the Parliament he reported that the United States had been employing the PKK, a Kurdish terrorist group, against Turkey.

== Personal life and death ==
Topuz was married and had two children. He suffered a cerebral haemorrhage in Kyrenia, Northern Cyprus, on 8 February 2019. He was transferred to a hospital in Istanbul and died there on 14 October 2019. He was buried in Istanbul.
