= Lütfi Doğan =

Lütfi Doğan may refer to:

- Lütfi Doğan (politician, born 1930) (1930–2023), Turkish theologian and politician
- Lütfi Doğan (politician, born 1927) (1927–2018), Turkish academic, theologian and politician
