= Perihan Arıburun =

Turkish politician (1913–2001)

Member of the Grand National Assembly
- In office 1 November 1957 – 25 May 1960
- Constituency: İzmir (1957)

Personal details
- Born: 23 January 1913 Istanbul, Ottoman Empire
- Died: 18 January 2001 (aged 87)
- Party: Democrat Party
- Spouse: Tekin Arıburun (m. 1940; died 1993)
- Children: 2
- Parent: Abdüllatif Naci Pasha (father)
- Education: Ankara University, Law School

Nimet Perihan Arıburun (23 January 1913 – 18 January 2001) was a Turkish politician.

== Family ==
She was the maternal granddaughter of Grand Vizier Kâmil Pasha, the daughter of General Abdüllatif Naci Pasha, who was a teacher of Atatürk at the War Academy, and the wife of Tekin Arıburun, Commander of the Turkish Air Force and President of the Republic of Turkey's Senate of the Republic. She was a cousin of Minister of National Education Yusuf Hikmet Bayur. She had two children.

== Life ==
After graduating from Ankara Girls' High School, she graduated from the Ankara University Faculty of Law in 1931. She served as a judge in the 3rd Criminal Chamber of the Court of Cassation, as an assistant judge in Cide, and as a private attorney. She was involved in activities at the Turkish Aeronautical Association, the Ankara School for the Blind, and the Foundation for Light for the Blind, of which she was a founding member and served as president; for 15 years, she read books once a week at Ankara Middle School for the Blind and helped establish its Foreign Language Laboratory. Following her volunteer work at the Washington Red Cross Blood Bank from 1946 to 1948, she played an active role in the establishment of the Turkish Red Crescent Blood Bank and, between 1956 and 1960, in the training of female officers in the Turkish Air Force. She was an İzmir deputy in the 11th term of the Grand National Assembly of Turkey (TBMM). She served on the Education Committee.

== Publications ==
- Eldeniz (Arıburun), Perihan (1951). "Amerika Çocuk Mahkemeleri Üzerinde İntibalar". Journal of Justice (Adalet Dergisi). No. 6.
- Grabinska, W. Wall İrene (1939). Çocuk Mahkemeleri ve Çocuk Müesseseleri. Translated by Eldeniz (Arıburun), Perihan. Ankara: Yeni Cezaevi Matbaası.
