= KONDA Research and Consultancy =

Anonymous company in the Republic of Turkey

KONDA Research and Consultancy KONDA Araştırma ve Danışmanlık A.Ş.
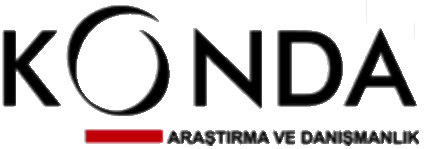
- Company type: Anonymous company
- Industry: Opinion polling Consultancy
- Founded: 1986
- Founders: Tarhan Erdem
- Headquarters: Yıldız, Beşiktaş, Istanbul
- Area served: Turkey
- Key people: Aydın Erdem (General Manager)
- Website: konda.com

KONDA Research and Consultancy (Turkish: KONDA Araştırma ve Danışmanlık) is an anonymous company in Turkey that specialises in public opinion polling and consultancy. It was founded in 1986 by Tarhan Erdem, a former Minister of Industry and Technology in the centre-left minority government of Bülent Ecevit in 1977.

Since March 2010, KONDA has compiled monthly 'barometers' that consist of public opinion polls conducted within a sample between 1,800 and 3,600. Their opinion polls measure the public outlook on contemporary issues in Turkey such as nationalism, the headscarf, outlook on companies and finance, political allegiances as well as law and justice. The company also publishes two indexes to measure political polarisation and public satisfaction.

== Opinion polling ==
KONDA has been one of the political opinion polling companies active during the November 2015 general election, June 2015 general election, the 2014 presidential election and the 2014 local elections. The company's opinion polls have been with varying degrees of success. Their last opinion poll before the June 2015 general election came close to capturing the eventual result. However, a rouge poll released by KONDA just before the 2014 presidential election resulted in the company issuing a public apology after the actual results significantly differed from their polling results.

=== Political allegiances ===
KONDA president Tarhan Erdem was a former politician and government minister from the Republican People's Party (CHP), having served briefly as the Minister of Industry and Technology in the centre-left minority government of Bülent Ecevit between June and July 1977. He later resigned from the CHP and was perceived to have close relations with the governing Justice and Development Party (AKP), which took power in 2002. Erdem has often openly discussed the political prospects of different parties with the media.

== See also ==
- Opinion polls in Turkey
