= Fehmi Yavuz =

Turkish civil servant, academic and writer

Ministry of National Education
- In office 30 May 1960 – 27 August 1960
- Prime Minister: Cemal Gürsel
- Preceded by: Atıf Benderlioğlu
- Succeeded by: Bedrettin Tuncel

Minister of Construction and Settlement
- In office 27 August 1960 – 6 February 1961
- Prime Minister: Cemal Gürsel
- Preceded by: Orhan Kubat
- Succeeded by: Rüştü Özal

Personal details
- Born: 1912 Isparta, Ottoman Empire
- Died: 11 July 1991 (aged 78–79)
- Education: Ankara University, Faculty of Political Sciences
- Occupation: Academic, politician, writer

Fehmi Yavuz (1912 – 11 July 1991) was a Turkish civil servant, academic, writer and government minister.

== Early life ==
He was born in Isparta in 1912. After his primary and secondary education in Isparta, he completed Pertevniyal High School in Istanbul. He graduated from the Faculty of Political Sciences of Ankara University 1937. In 1942, he returned to his faculty as the assistant of Professor Ernest Reuter. In 1951, he earned the title professor in the same faculty. Between 1953 and 1955, he studied urban development in United Kingdom. In 1958 he was elected as the dean of the faculty.

== Political life ==
In 1960 after the 1960 Turkish coup, he was appointed as the Minister of National Educationin the 24th government of Turkey between 30 May 1960 and 27 August 1960. Following a reshuffle in the government he was appointed as the Minister of Construction and Settlement. After the formation of the Constituent Assembly of Turkey in which he was a member, he continued in the same seat in the 25th government between 5 January 1961 and 6 February 1961.

== Later years ==
After the constituent assembly term he returned to academic life and taught in the Middle East Technical University and Zonguldak Karaelmas University. He died on 11 July 1991.

== Books ==
He was also a writer. The following are his books

- 1946: Köy İdarelerimizin Maliyesi (English: "Finance of the Village Administration")
- 1952:Ankara'nın İmarı ve Şehirciliğimiz (English:"Reconstruction of Ankara and our Urbanism")
- 1953:Şehircilik Ders Kitabı (English: "Textbook of Urban Development")
- 1956: Şehirciliğimiz Hakkında Mukayeseli Raporlar (English: "Comparative Reports on the City Planning")
- 1960: Şehircide Aranan Vasıflar hakkında İngiliz Kraliyet Komisyonu Raporu (English: "British Royal Committee Report on the Qualifications of the City Planner")
- 1962: Şehirlerimizin Mali İdaresi Konusunda Anket Raporu (English: "A Survey on the Financial Administration of Turkish Municipalities")
- 1962:Şehircilik (English: "Urban Development")
- 1964: Memleketimizde Toplum Kalkınması (English: "Public development in our Country")
- 1964: Mahalli İdarelerimizin Problemleri (English: "Problems of Turkish Local Administration")
- 1966: Türk Mahalli İdarelerinin Yeniden Düzenlenmesi Üzerine bir Araştırme (English: "A Survey on the Reform of Turkish Local Administration")
- 1983:Ölüm Duyuruları (English: "Death Announcements")

Among his notable publications, "A Survey on the Financial Administration of Turkish Municipalities" and "Problems of Turkish Local Administration" were also made available in English.
