= Bedrettin Tuncel =

Turkish politician and academic

Minister of National Education
- In office 10 September 1960 – 5 January 1961
- Prime Minister: Cemal Gürsel
- Preceded by: Fehmi Yavuz
- Succeeded by: Turhan Feyzioğlu

Personal details
- Born: 1910 Tirebolu, Giresun Province, Turkey
- Died: 19 March 1980 (aged 69–70) Ankara, Turkey
- Occupation: Academic, politician

Bedrettin Tuncel (1910 – 19 March 1980) was a former academic and a politician in Turkey. He served in the Ankara University for 35 years. He also lectured on the history of Art in the conservatory of Ankara for 10 years. After 27 July 1963 he served as the speaker of Turkish National Committee of UNESCO

== Early life ==
Born in 1910 in Tirebolu of Giresun Province, he graduated from Galatasaray High School in 1932. For higher education he went to France to study French literature. He graduated from the Lumière University Lyon 2 in 1936.

== Political life ==
After the 1960 Turkish coup d'etat in addition to his academic works, he was also appointed as the representative of universities in the Constituent Assembly of Turkey. In the 24th government of Turkey he served as the Minister of National Education. But during the democratic regime after 1961, he returned to his academic life.

== Books ==
Tuncel is the author of the following books. He also translated books from French.

- Seçme Yazılar ("Selected Essays"), İstanbul:Yapı Kredi Yayınları ISBN 975-363-334-3
- Tiyatro Tarihi (History of theatre), 1938
- Mahatma Gandi, 1869-1948 (1969)
- Fransızca'da Yunus Emre (Yunus Emre in French language),1971
- Atatürk ve 30 Ağustos Zaferi'nin İlk Kutlanışı (Atatürk and the First celebration of the 30th of August Victory),1972
- Büyük Zafer ve Afyonkarahisar (Great Victory and Afyonkarahisar),1972
- Nikola Kopernik, 1473-1973 (1973),
- Dimitrie Cantemir 1673-1724 (1975),
- Romanya'nın Sesi (Voice of Romania), 1979

He also translated books from French.

Preceded by Fehmi Yavuz	Minister of National Education; 10 September 1960 – 5 January 1961	Succeeded by Turhan Feyzioğlu
