= 24th government of Turkey =

Government of the Republic of Turkey (1960-1961)

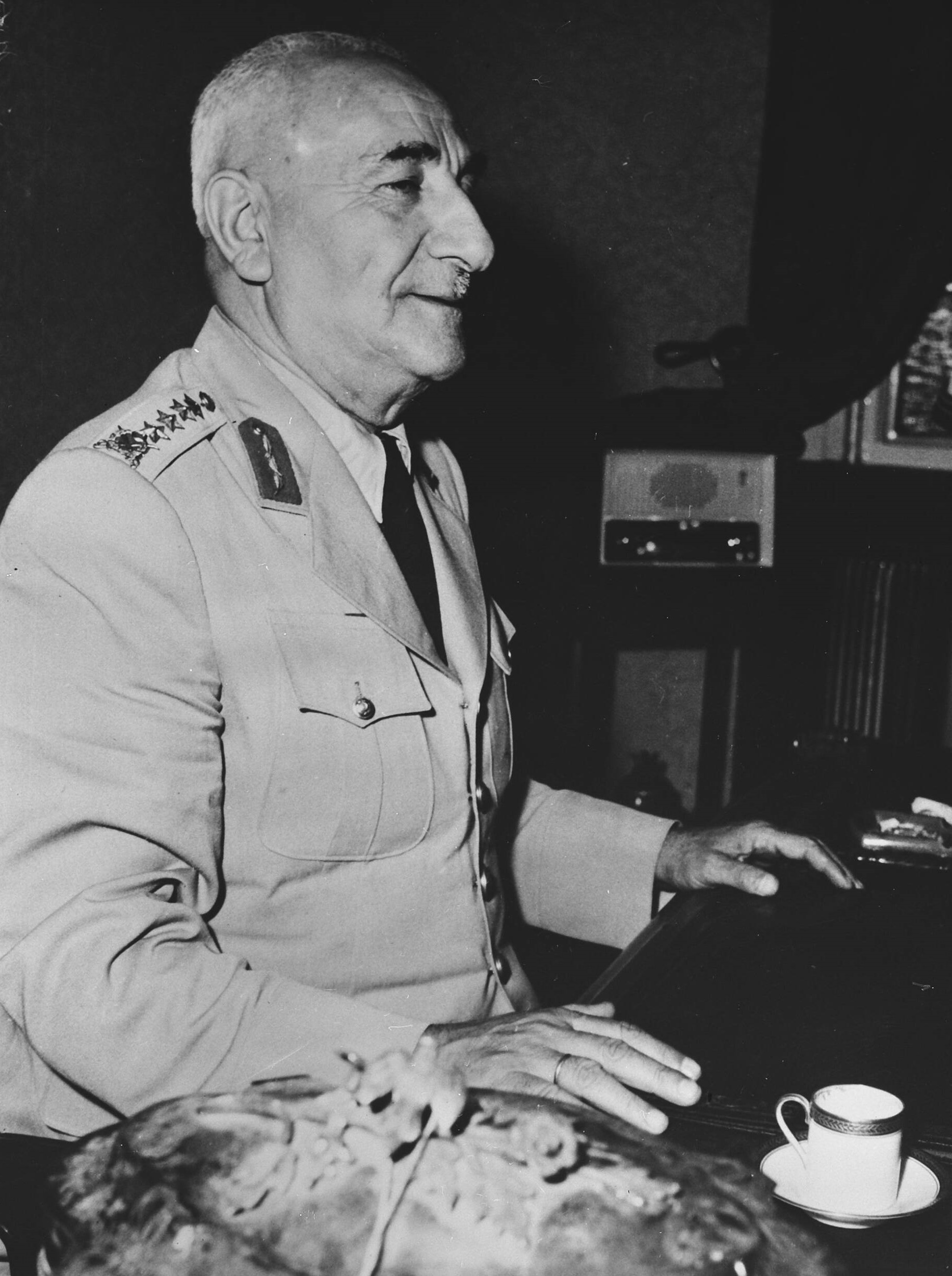
Cemal Gürsel

The 24th government of Turkey (30 May 1960 – 5 January 1961) was a government in the history of Turkey. It is also called the first Gürsel government.

== Background ==
After the 1960 Turkish coup d'état, the coup leader Cemal Gürsel formed a technocratic government.

== The government ==
In the list below, the cabinet members who served only a part of the cabinet's lifespan are shown in the column "Notes".

Title	Name	Notes
Prime Minister	Cemal Gürsel	
Deputy Prime Minister	Fahri Özdilek	22 December 1960 – 5 January 1961
Minister of State
Minister of State	Amil Artus; Nasır Zeytinoğlu	30 May 1960 – 27 August 1960; 6 September 1960 – 5 January 1961
Minister of State	Şefik İnan; Hayri Mumcuoğlu	30 May 1960 – 27 August 1960; 6 September 1960 – 5 January 1961
Ministry of Justice	Abdullah Gözübüyük; Amil Artus	30 May 1960 – 27 August 1960; 27 August 1960 – 5 January 1961
Ministry of National Defense	Fahri Özdilek; Hüseyin Ataman	9 June 1960 – 22 October 1960; 22 October 1960 – 5 January 1961
Ministry of the Interior	Muharrem İhsan Kızıloğlu	
Ministry of Foreign Affairs	Selim Sarper	30 May 1960 – 26 December 1960
Ministry of Finance	Ekrem Alican; Kemal Kurdaş	30 May 1960 – 26 December 1960; 26 December 1960 – 5 January 1961
Ministry of National Education	Fehmi Yavuz; Bedrettin Tuncel	30 May 1960 – 27 August 1960; 10 September 1960 – 5 January 1961
Ministry of Construction and Settlement	Orhan Kubat; Fehmi Yavuz	30 May 1960 – 27 August 1960; 27 Aug 1960 – 5 January 1961
Ministry of Public Works	Daniş Koper; Mukbil Gökdoğan	30 May 1960 – 27 August 1960; 12 September 1960 – 5 January 1961
Ministry of Health and Social Security	Nusret Karasu; Ragıp Üner	30 May 1960 – 27 August 1960; 6 September 1960 – 5 January 1961
Ministry of Customs and Monopolies	Fethi Aşkın	
Ministry of Transport	Sıtkı Ulay	
Ministry of Industry	Muhtar Usluer; Şahap Kocatopçu	30 May 1960 – 27 August 1960; 6 September 1960 – 5 January 1961
Ministry of Commerce	Cihat İren; Mehmet Baydur	30 May 1960 – 27 August 1960; 6 September 1960 – 5 January 1961
Ministry of Agriculture	Feridun Üstün; Osman Tosun	30 May 1960 – 27 August 1960; 29 Aug 1960 – 5 January 1961
Ministry of Labour	Cahit Talas; Raşit Beşerler	30 May 1960 – 27 August 1960; 6 September 1960 – 5 January 1961
Ministry Tourism and Press	Zühtü Tarhan	30 May 1960 – 27 August 1960

== Aftermath ==
By the beginning of 1961, the constituent assembly was formed. Cemal Gürsel resigned to form a new cabinet that would cooperate with the constituent assembly.

Preceded by 23rd government of Turkey (Adnan Menderes)	24th Government of Turkey; 30 May 1960 - 5 January 1961	Succeeded by 25th government of Turkey (Cemal Gürsel)
