= Ferda Güley =

Turkish politician

Hasan Ferda Güley

Minister of Transport
- In office 26 January 1974 – 17 November 1974
- Preceded by: Sabahattin Özbek
- Succeeded by: Sabahattin Özbek
- Prime Minister: Bülent Ecevit

Personal details
- Born: 1916 Aybastı, Ordu Province, Ottoman Empire
- Died: 17 November 2008 (aged 91–92) Istanbul, Turkey
- Education: Turkish Military Academy; Istanbul University
- Occupation: Politician
- Profession: Military officer

Hasan Ferda Güley (1916 – 17 November 2008) was a Turkish military officer, politician, and former government minister.

== Biography ==
Hasan Ferda was born in the Aybastı ilçe (district) of Ordu Province, Ottoman Empire in 1916. He graduated from the Turkish Military Academy and the Faculty of Letters of Istanbul University.

After serving in the Turkish Military Academy as a teacher, he joined the Republican People's Party (CHP) and was elected into the 11th parliament as a deputy of Ordu Province. He kept his seat in the 12th, 13th, 14th and the 15th Parliament of Turkey as well as the Constituent Assembly of Turkey. In his last term in the parliament, he was appointed Minister of Transport during the 37th government of Turkey serving between 26 January 1974 and 17 November 1974.

Hasan Ferda Güley died in Istanbul on 17 November 2008. He was buried in Cebeci Asri Cemetery in Ankara.

Güley was married and a father of four.
