= Şahap Kocatopçu =

Turkish engineer and politician (1916–2012)

Personal details
- Born: Şahabettin Şefkati Kocatopçu; 17 February 1916 Istanbul, Ottoman Empire
- Died: 25 April 2012 (aged 96) Istanbul, Turkey
- Party: Independent
- Children: 2
- Education: Massachusetts Institute of Technology

Şahap Kocatopçu (1916–2012) was a Turkish engineer, politician and businesspeople. He was the minister of industry for two times in the cabinets established after the military coups. He headed several state and private companies.

== Early life and education ==
He was born in Istanbul on 17 February 1916. He was educated in Galatasaray High School until 1936. He graduated from Massachusetts Institute of Technology in 1954 receiving a degree in metallurgical and materials engineering. He also obtained a Ph.D. in the same field.

== Career ==
Kocatopçu started his career at Sümerbank in 1945. Then he joined the General Directorate of Cement Industry as a planning manager. On 11 May 1954 he was named as the director general of the state-owned Turkey Bottle and Glass Factories and held this post until 22 September 1980. Following the military coup in 1960 he was elected to the Constituent Assembly. Between 1960 and 1961 he served as the minister of industry and technology in the cabinet formed by Cemal Gürsel. He resigned from the post on 14 July 1961.

Kocatopçu became the first chairman of the Turkish Employer Unions Confederation in 1962 of which he was one of the founders. He held the post until 1967. In 1963 he became the chair of the council at Istanbul Chamber of Industry. He was appointed minister of industry in 1980 after the military coup and remained in office until 13 December 1981 when he resigned from office. He was the chairman of the Turkish Industry and Business Association between 1985 and 1986.

=== Membership and activities ===
Kocatopçu was confounder of various foundations and served in their boards. He was a member of the Galatasaray S.K.

== Personal life and death ==
Kocatopçu was married and had two children. He died in Istanbul on 25 April 2012 at age 96. Kocatopçu was interred in Zincirlikuyu Cemetery in Istanbul.

=== Awards ===
Kocatopçu was the recipient of Ordre national du Mérite (1984).
