= Besim Üstünel =

- Born: 1927; Gaziantep, Turkey
- Died: June 2, 2015 (aged 88); Istanbul, Turkey
- Resting place: Ulus Cemetery, Istanbul
- Education: Economics
- Alma mater: Istanbul University; London School of Economics
- Spouse: Gülen Üstünel

Besim Üstünel (1927 – June 2, 2015) was an academic in economics, politician and former Minister of Finance of Turkey.

== Family life and early years ==
Besim Üstünel was born to Emin Üstünel and his wife Zekiye in Gaziantep, Southeastern Turkey in 1927. He had four sisters Nermin, Saadet, Sema, Aysen and six brothers Ahmet, Cevat, Rasim Daşar, Mesut, Gündüz, Erol.

After his primary and secondary education in his home city, Üstünel graduated from the School of Economics at Istanbul University in 1946. After doctorate studies in the same university, he completed his post graduate studies in London School of Economics.

He was married to Gülen Üstünel, born Cin.

== Career ==
Besim Üstünel pursued a teaching career, and taught in the Faculty of Political Science, Ankara University. During this period, he served as a visiting professor in the universities of Stockholm and Minnesota. Üstünel served also in the State planning Organization of Turkey.

In 1965, he was appointed deputy secretary general of the Republican People's Party (CHP) upon request of the party leader İsmet İnönü. However, he did not enter the parliament for active politics. In the 1975 Turkish senate elections, he became a CHP senator serving until the 1980 Turkish coup d'état. Between June 21 and July 21, 1977, he served as the Minister of Finance in the 40th government of Turkey (2nd Bülent Ecevit government), which failed to receive the vote of confidence.

After the 1980 military coup, he returned to academic studies, and taught in the Istanbul Technical University and later at Marmara University and Galatasaray University. In 1986 he served in Seijo University in Tokyo as a visiting professor. He also served as the speaker of Turkish delegation in Council of Europe between 1980-1981.

== Death ==
Üstünel died in Istanbul Florence Nightingale Hospital on June 2, 2015. Following the religious ceremony at Teşvikiye Mosque, he was interred in Ulus Cemetery on June 4, 2015.

== Works ==
- Üstüne, Besim. Ekonominin Temelleri. Istanbul. p. 383. ISBN 978-975-304-0648.
- Üstüne, Besim. Makro Ekonomi. Istanbul: Alfa Yayınları. p. 311.

Political offices
Preceded by Yılmaz Ergenekon	Minister of Finance of Turkey; June 21, 1977–July 21, 1977	Succeeded by Nevzat Cihat Bilgehan
