= İbrahim Şevki Atasagun =

Turkish politician

President of Turkey
- Acting
- In office 2 February 1966 – 28 March 1966
- Preceded by: Cemal Gürsel
- Succeeded by: Cevdet Sunay

President of the Senate of Turkey
- In office 16 December 1965 – 14 July 1970
- Preceded by: Mehmet Enver Aka
- Succeeded by: Tekin Arıburun

Undersecretary of Ministry of Health of Turkey
- In office 16 January 1958 – 14 July 1960

Personal details
- Born: 1899 Istanbul, Ottoman Empire
- Died: 28 May 1984 (aged 84–85) Ankara, Turkey
- Education: Istanbul University

İbrahim Şevki Atasagun (1899, Istanbul, Ottoman Empire – 28 May 1984, Ankara, Turkey) was a Turkish soldier and statesman. In 1966, he served as acting president for 54 days when President Cemal Gürsel underwent medical treatments in the United States.

== Career ==
He graduated from Istanbul Darulfünûn Medical School, where he entered as a military student. He participated in the Turkish War of Independence on the Western front with the rank of medical lieutenant and won the Medal of Independence (İstiklâl Madalyası) by rising to first lieutenant. He was appointed to the Military Medical School (Gülhane Academy) as a negotiator physician. He completed his internal medicine specialist training in 1926. When he passed the Medical Faculty Hygiene Associate Professorship exam, which he entered on leave from the General Staff, he was considered on leave for five years, without prejudice to his connection with the army. He was appointed to Erzurum Military Hospital (Marshal Çakmak Military Hospital) on 3 October 1933. He became a major in 1934. After the Tekirdağ Military Hospital, he was assigned to the Siirt Military Hospital. He served in the Eastern service after his appointment as a lieutenant colonel in 1941. He was transferred to Ankara Military School Chief Physician. He was appointed as the 2nd Medical Doctor of the Military Position Hospital. He worked in the General Staff Health Department (Turkish: Genelkurmay Sağlık Daire Başkanlığı). He was appointed as a hygiene professor at Gülhane Military Medical Academy. Brigadier general in 1953, and promoted to major general in 1956. He was appointed as the Head of the Land Forces Department of Health. He retired on 21 September 1957. Between 1958 and 1960 he served as the Undersecretary of the Ministry of Health.

In the election held on 15 October 1961 he was elected as a member of the Republican Senate Nevşehir as the candidate of the Republican Villagers Nation Party. He was re-elected in the one-third renewal election on 2 June 1968, and he continued this post until the renewal elections on 5 June 1977. He served as the Head of the National Defense Commission in 1963 and 1964. He left his party between 4 June 1962 and 7 February 1963 and remained independent. After a while he returned to his party, but left again on 25 February 1964 and joined the Justice Party on 9 April 1964. He became the Vice President in the first election of the Presidential Board of the Senate of the Republic held on 28 October 1961. He held this post until the election on 2 November 1962. He was elected as the President of the Senate of the Republic on 2 December 1965 and he continued this duty until 9 November 1970.

He acted as President of the Republic between 2 February and 28 March 1966, when President Cemal Gürsel was in treatment in the United States. He chaired the Senate Delegations, which officially visited Berlin, Poland, Czechoslovakia, Iran, Pakistan and Hungary at the invitation of the Parliament Presidents.

Political offices
Preceded by Mehmet Enver Aka	Chairmen of the Senate of Turkey; 16 December 1965– 14 July 1970	Succeeded by Tekin Arıburun
Preceded by Cemal Gürsel	Acting President of Turkey; 2 February 1966– 28 March 1966	Succeeded by Cevdet Sunay
Preceded by Ekrem Tok	Undersecretary of Ministry of Health of Turkey; 16 January 1958– 4 July 1960	Succeeded by Nusret Fişek
