= Acting President of Turkey =

Acting head of state post in Turkey's constitution

- Executive branch in Turkish Politics
- Status: Acting Head of State; Acting Head of Government
- Member of: Government; National Security Council
- Term length: Situational
- Constituting instrument: Constitution of Turkey

The acting president of Turkey (Turkish: Türkiye cumhurbaşkanı vekili) is a temporary post provided by the Constitution of Turkey. The acting president is a person who fulfills the duties and powers of the president of Turkey when cases of incapacity and vacancy occur.

In cases where the President of Turkey temporarily leaves his office due to illness or going abroad, the oldest Vice President of Turkey shall act for the President and exercise the powers of the President. If the office of the President becomes vacant, the Presidential election is held within 45 days. Until a new one is elected, the Vice President acts as the President and exercises the powers of the President.

== History ==
Prior to the 2017 Turkish constitutional referendum, the role of acting president was given to the Speaker of the Grand National Assembly of Turkey. Following the outcome of the referendum, the relevant article in the constitution was changed from the Speaker to the Vice President of Turkey.

== Constitutional provisions on acting Presidency ==
Article 106, Chapter 2:

If the presidential office becomes vacant for any reason, the presidential election shall be held within forty-five days. The Deputy President of the Republic of Turkey shall act as and exercise the powers of the President of the Republic until the next President of the Republic is elected. If one year or less remains for the general election, the election for the Grand National Assembly of Turkey shall be renewed together with the presidential election. If more than one year remains for the general election, the President of the Republic of Turkey shall continue to serve until the election date of the Grand National Assembly of Turkey.

In cases where the President of the Republic is temporarily absent from his/her duties on account of illness or travelling abroad, the deputy president acts as the President of the Republic and exercises his/her powers.

== List ==
The following politicians served as acting presidents.

No	Portrait	Acting president	Term of office		Time in office	Post	President	Reason
–		Abdülhalik Renda (1881–1957)	10 November 1938	11 November 1938	1 day	Speaker of the Grand National Assembly	Mustafa Kemal Atatürk	President Atatürk's death while in office
–		Tekin Arıburun (1903–1993)	28 March 1973	6 April 1973	9 days	Chairmen of the Senate	Cevdet Sunay	The end of Sunay's presidency and the prolongation of the 6th presidential election
–		İhsan Sabri Çağlayangil (1908–1993)	6 April 1980	12 September 1980	159 days	Chairmen of the Senate	Fahri Korutürk	The end Korutürk's presidency and the prolongation of the 7th presidential election
–		Hüsamettin Cindoruk (1933–2026)	17 April 1993	16 May 1993	29 days	Speaker of the Grand National Assembly	Turgut Özal	President Özal's death while in office
