= Mustafa Üstündağ =

Mustafa Üstündağ may refer to:

- Mustafa Üstündağ (politician)
- Mustafa Üstündağ (actor)
