= Lütfi Doğan (politician, born 1930) =

Turkish theologian and politician (1930–2023)

President of the Directorate of Religious Affairs
- In office 15 January 1968 – 25 August 1972
- Preceded by: Ali Rıza Hakses
- Succeeded by: Lütfi Doğan

Member of the Senate for Erzurum
- In office 14 October 1973 – 12 September 1980

Member of the Grand National Assembly
- In office 6 November 1991 – 14 November 2002
- Constituency: Gümüşhane (1991, 1995, 1999)

Personal details
- Born: 1930 Köse, Gümüşhane, Turkey
- Died: 4 December 2023 (aged 93) Çankaya, Ankara, Turkey
- Party: MSP; RP; SAADET
- Education: Ankara University
- Occupation: Theologian

Lütfi Doğan (1930 – 4 December 2023) was a Turkish theologian and politician. A member of the National Salvation Party, the Welfare Party, and the Felicity Party, he served as president of the Directorate of Religious Affairs from 1968 to 1972, the Senate from 1973 to 1980, and the Grand National Assembly from 1991 to 1999.

Doğan died in Çankaya District on 4 December 2023, at the age of 93.
