= Orhan Mersinli =

Turkish politician

Mehmet Orhan Mersinli

Minister of Transport
- In office 5 January 1961 – 20 November 1961
- Prime Minister: Cemal Gürsel
- Preceded by: Sıtkı Ulay
- Succeeded by: Mustafa Cahit Akyar

Personal details
- Born: 1912 Constantinople, Ottoman Empire
- Died: 17 February 1975 (aged 61–62)
- Children: 2
- Education: Civil engineering
- Alma mater: Boğaziçi University
- Occupation: Civil servant, politician
- Profession: Civil engineering

Mehmet Orhan Mersinli (1912 – 17 February 1975) was a Turkish civil engineer, civil servant and government minister.

== Biography ==
Orhan Mersinli was born in Constantinople in 1912. His father was Cemal Mersinli, an Ottoman pasha who was a member of the Ottoman government. He completed Robert College in Istanbul and the University of Illinois. He was appointed as the vice director of the General Directorate of Highways (KGM) serving between 1949–1955. He was the general director of KGM between 1956–1958 .

Following the 1960 Turkish coup, on 5 January 1961 he was appointed to the Constituent Assembly of Turkey by the president. During this parliamentary period between 5 January 1961 and 20 November 1961 he was appointed as the Minister of Transport in the 25th government of Turkey. The first Turkish made automobile Devrim was manufactured during his term.

He did not run for the 1961 general elections and after the elections he became an advisor in a private industrial company.

He was married and father of two. He died on 17 February 1975.
