= Sabahattin Özbek =

Turkish minister (1915–2001)

Minister of National Education
- In office 22 May 1972 – 15 April 1973
- President: Ferit Melen
- Preceded by: İsmail Hakkı Arar
- Succeeded by: Orhan Dengiz

Minister of Transport
- In office 15 April 1973 – 26 January 1974
- President: Naim Talu
- Preceded by: Rıfkı Danışman
- Succeeded by: Hasan Ferda Güley
- In office 17 November 1974 – 31 March 1975
- President: Sadi Irmak
- Preceded by: Hasan Ferda Güley
- Succeeded by: Nahit Menteşe

Minister of Interior
- In office 10 April 1977 – 21 June 1977
- President: Süleyman Demirel
- Preceded by: Oğuzhan Asiltürk
- Succeeded by: Necdet Uğur

Minister of Agriculture and Forestry
- In office 21 September 1980 – 13 December 1983
- President: Bülend Ulusu
- Preceded by: Hasan Ekinci; Cemal Külahlı
- Succeeded by: Hüsnü Doğan

Member of the Grand National Assembly
- Constituency: Bursa (1983)

Personal details
- Born: 1915 Erzurum, Ottoman Empire
- Died: 29 August 2001 (aged 85–86) Ankara, Turkey
- Education: Ankara University
- Occupation: Politician

Ahmet Sabahattin Özbek (1915 – 29 August 2001) was a Turkish politician and academic who served five times as a minister in the 35th, 36th, 38th, 39th and 44th governments of Turkey. He entered the Grand National Assembly in 1983 and retired from politics in 1987. Prior to his political career, Özbek graduated from the Ankara University, became the first rector of the Atatürk University and a dean at the Ankara University.

== Early and personal life ==
Born in 1915 in Erzurum, Özbek graduated from the Ankara University Faculty of Agriculture in 1937. He was married and had three children. In addition to Turkish and English, he spoke German and French.

== Career ==
He became a professor in 1953, and became a dean at the Ankara University from 1955 to 1957. He became the first rector of the Atatürk University on 1 February 1959 and kept that position until 26 September 1960. He returned to being a dean at the Ankara University from 1965 to 1968, where he also was a lecturer.

His political career started when he was appointed as a member of the Senate of the Republic in 1973. Özbek remained a senator until 1978. He was the Minister of National Education from 1972 to 1973, the Minister of Transport on two separate occasions from 1973 to 1975, the Minister of Interior in 1977 and the Minister of Agriculture and Forestry from 1980 to 1983. Özbek later entered the Grand National Assembly as an independent member of the Bursa district from 1983 to 1987 and spoke six times in the parliament. He retired from politics after 1987. On 29 August 2001, Özbek died in Ankara.
