= Nahit Menteşe =

Turkish politician (1932–2024)

Turkish Deputy Prime Minister
- In office 6 March 1996 – 28 June 1996
- President: Süleyman Demirel
- Preceded by: Deniz Baykal
- Succeeded by: Tansu Çiller

Minister of Internal Affairs of Turkey
- In office 25 October 1993 – 1 November 1995
- President: Süleyman Demirel
- Preceded by: Metin Gazioğlu
- Succeeded by: Teoman Ünüsan

Minister of National Education of Turkey
- In office 25 June 1993 – 25 October 1993
- President: Süleyman Demirel
- Preceded by: Köksal Toptan
- Succeeded by: Nevzat Ayaz
- In office 21 July 1977 – 5 January 1978
- President: Fahri Korutürk
- Preceded by: Mustafa Üstündağ
- Succeeded by: Mustafa Necdet Uğur

Minister of Tourism and Promotion of Turkey
- In office 11 April 1977 – 21 Haziran 1977
- President: Fahri Korutürk
- Preceded by: Lütfi Tokoğlu
- Succeeded by: Altan Öymen

Turkish Minister of Transport
- In office 31 March 1975 – 11 April 1977
- President: Fahri Korutürk
- Preceded by: Sabahattin Özbek
- Succeeded by: İbrahim Aysoy
- In office 3 November 1969 – 6 March 1970
- President: Cevdet Sunay
- Preceded by: Mehmet İzmen
- Succeeded by: Mehmet Orhan Tuğrul

Minister of Energy and Natural Resources of Turkey
- In office 14 December 1970 – 26 March 1971
- President: Cevdet Sunay
- Preceded by: Sabit Osman Avcı
- Succeeded by: İhsan Topaloğlu

Turkish Minister of Customs and Monopoly
- In office 10 December 1968 – 3 November 1969
- President: Cevdet Sunay
- Preceded by: İbrahim Tekin
- Succeeded by: Ahmet İhsan Birincioğlu

Personal details
- Born: 1 April 1932 Milas, Muğla, Turkey
- Died: 31 December 2024 (aged 92) Ankara, Turkey

Nahit Menteşe (1 April 1932 – 31 December 2024) was a Turkish politician who served in various ministerial posts in the 1960s and 1970s, and again in the 1990s, including Minister of Interior 1993 to 1996. He was briefly Deputy Prime Minister of Turkey in 1996 under Mesut Yılmaz in the 53rd government of Turkey.

== Life and career ==
Menteşe was elected to parliament in 1965, serving as Minister of Customs and Excise in 1968–1969. Re-elected in 1969, he served as Minister of Transport (1969–1970) and Energy (1970–1971). He was again Minister of Transport in 1975–1977. He was re-elected to parliament in 1977, and was Minister of National Education 1977–1978. He became Secretary-General of the Justice Party prior to the 1980 Turkish coup d'état.

After some years absence from parliament he was re-elected in 1991 and 1995, becoming Minister of Interior (1993–1996) and briefly Deputy Prime Minister of Turkey in 1996.

Menteşe died on 31 December 2024, at the age of 92.
