= Ziya Selçuk =

Turkish educator and politician

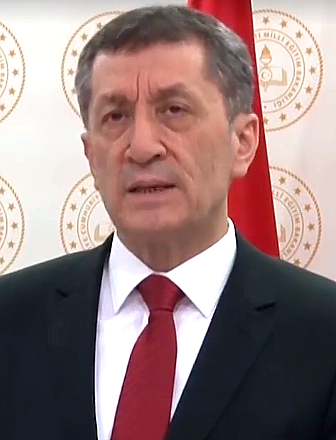
- Selçuk in 2019

Former Minister of National Education
- In office 10 July 2018 – 6 August 2021
- President: Recep Tayyip Erdoğan
- Preceded by: İsmet Yılmaz
- Succeeded by: Mahmut Özer

Personal details
- Born: 1 May 1961 (age 65) Emirler, Gölbaşı, Turkey
- Party: Independent
- Education: Ankara University; Hacettepe University
- Occupation: Politician, educator

Ziya Selçuk (born 1 May 1961) is a Turkish politician and educator. He is the former Minister of National Education. He was formerly a professor of education at Gazi University.

== Early life and education ==
Selçuk was born on 1 May 1961 in Emirler village in Gölbaşı, Ankara. He graduated from Ankara University Faculty of Educational Sciences, subsequently completing his master's degree in developmental psychology. In 1989, he completed his doctoral studies at Hacettepe University, on guidance and psychological counseling. He was promoted to associate professorship and professorship at Gazi University Faculty of Education.

== Education career ==
Selçuk acted as a faculty member for multiple Turkish universities, including TED University. He has acted as the chairman of the Head Council of Education and Morality between 21 March 2003 and 8 May 2008, overseeing the curriculum reform during this time. As a part of the negotiations for the accession of Turkey to the European Union, he has represented the country on the topics of science and education.

== Political career ==
On 10 July 2018, Selçuk became the Minister of National Education. On 5 August 2021, he announced that he would resign from the position. His resignation was approved on the following day through a decree published in T.C. Resmî Gazete, and he was replaced by Mahmut Özer.

Political offices
Preceded by İsmet Yılmaz	Minister of National Education; 10 July 2018 – 6 August 2021	Succeeded by Mahmut Özer
