= Mahmut Özer =

Turkish politician (born 1970)

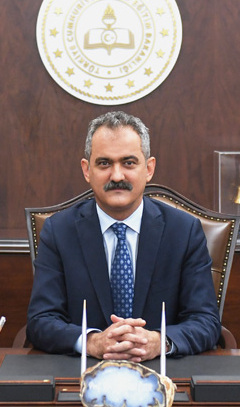

Minister of National Education
- In office 6 August 2021 – 4 June 2023
- President: Recep Tayyip Erdoğan
- Preceded by: Ziya Selçuk
- Succeeded by: Yusuf Tekin

President of Measuring, Selection and Placement Center
- In office 4 October 2017 – 8 August 2018
- Succeeded by: Halis Aygün

Rector of Zonguldak Bülent Ecevit University
- In office 28 November 2010 – 4 October 2017

Personal details
- Born: 5 May 1970 (age 55) Tokat, Turkey
- Political party: Justice and Development Party
- Education: Istanbul Technical University; Karadeniz Technical University

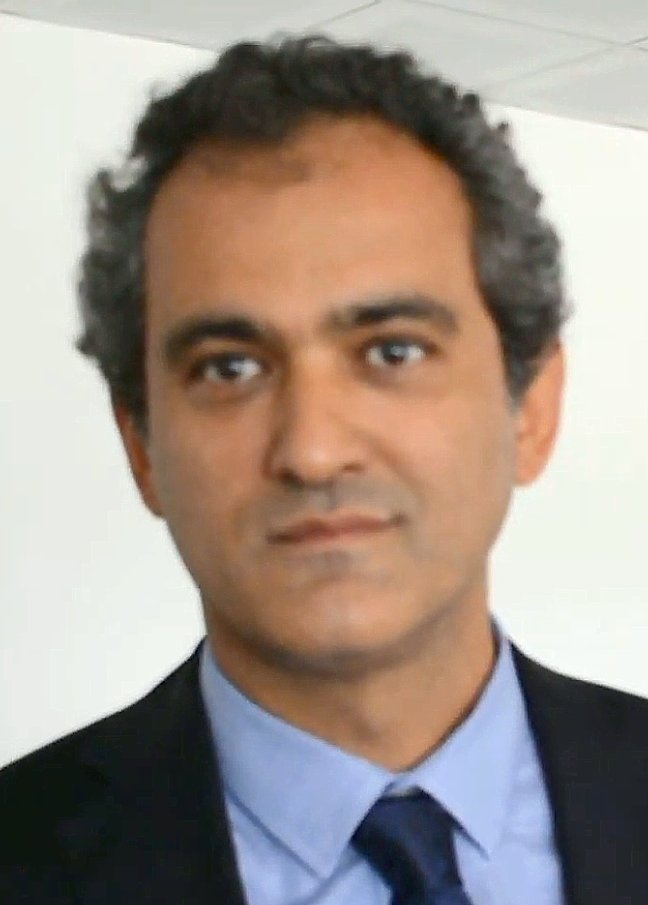
Mahmut Özer in 2016

Mahmut Özer (born 5 May 1970) is a Turkish politician, academic, former Bulent Ecevit University rector, former Measuring, Selection and Placement Center president and former Minister of National Education.

== Life ==
Born in Tokat in 1970, Özer graduated from Tokat Imam Hatip High School in 1988. He graduated from Istanbul Technical University Electronics and Communication Engineering Department in 1992. After working as an Electronics Engineer at Dalaman Airport, General Directorate of State Airports Authority between 1992 and 1994, he worked as a lecturer at Gaziosmanpaşa University Tokat Vocational School between 1994 and 2002.

Having completed his doctorate at Karadeniz Technical University, Institute of Science, Department of Electrical and Electronics Engineering in 2001, Özer started to work as an assistant professor at Zonguldak Karaelmas University (Bülent Ecevit University) Department of Electrical and Electronics Engineering in 2002. He received the title of associate professor in 2005 and professor in 2010 at the same university. While he has been working as the vice rector since 2009, he was appointed as the rector of Zonguldak Karaelmas University after he came first in the rectorate elections held in 2010. Özer, who also won the rectorate elections in 2014, was re-elected. He was appointed as the rector of Bulent Ecevit University.

Between 1 August 2015 and 1 August 2016 he served as the President of the Interuniversity Board. He continued his duty as the chief editor of the Turkish Journal of Electrical Engineering & Computer Sciences, which was published by Scientific and Technological Research Council of Turkey and scanned within the scope of Science Citation Index (SCI) since October 2014, and as the Deputy Chairman of the Vocational Qualifications Institution as the Council of Higher Education representative from 15 October 2015. He was appointed as the Deputy Minister of National Education on 8 August 2018.

He was appointed as the Minister of National Education, replacing Ziya Selçuk, with the appointment decision published in the Official Gazette of the Republic of Turkey on 6 August 2021.

In the 2023 Turkish parliamentary election, he was elected to the Grand National Assembly of Turkey in Ordu for the Justice and Development Party.

Political offices
Preceded by Ziya Selçuk	Minister of National Education; 6 August 2021 – 4 June 2023	Succeeded by Yusuf Tekin
