= Necdet Uğur =

Turkish politician (1923–2004)

Ministry of Interior
- In office 21 June 1977 – 21 July 1977
- Prime Minister: Bülent Ecevit
- Preceded by: Sabahattin Özbek
- Succeeded by: Korkut Özal

Minister of National Education
- In office 5 January 1978 – 12 November 1979
- Prime Minister: Bülent Ecevit
- Preceded by: Nahit Menteşe
- Succeeded by: Orhan Cemal Fersoy

Personal details
- Born: 1 January 1923 Mecitözü, Turkey
- Died: 27 September 2004 (aged 81) Istanbul, Turkey
- Party: Republican People's Party (CHP)
- Education: Ankara University
- Occupation: Politician

Necdet Uğur (full name Mustafa Necdet Uğur; 1 January 1923 – 27 September 2004) was a Turkish politician in Turkey.

== Early life and education ==
He was born in 1923 in Mecitözü in Çorum Province. In 1944 he graduated from the Faculty of Political Science, of Ankara University. He served as chief security director of several Turkish Provinces including Istanbul and İzmir. Before the 1963 Turkish local elections he was appointed as the Istanbul mayor to serve up to the election date. However he did not run for the office in the elections.

== Political life ==
After 1968 he attended politics in Republican People's Party (CHP) and became the speaker of the Istanbul branch of his party. On 11 October 1969 by the 1969 Turkish general election, he was elected to the lower house. He was also elected in 1973 and 1977 elections. In the short-lived 40th government of Turkey he was the Minister of Interior (1977). In the 42nd government of Turkey he was the Minister of National Education (1978-1979). After 1980 Turkish coup d'état like all senior politicians he abandoned politics . But in 1987 he became a member of Social Democrat Populist Party (SHP).

== Books ==
He wrote two books; İsmet İnönü and Alla Turca'nın Sonu. First book is on İsmet İnönü the former speaker of CHP and one of the friends of Atatürk, the founder of Turkish Republic. The second book is on criticism of the inadequacy of Turkish policy in the information age

== Death ==
He died on 27 September 2004 in Istanbul.

Preceded by Sabahattin Özbek	Minister of Interior; 21 June 1977 – 21 July 1977	Succeeded by Korkut Özal
Preceded by Nahit Menteşe	Minister of National Education; 5 January 1978 – 12 November 1979	Succeeded by Orhan Cemal Fersoy
