= Ahmet Tahtakılıç =

Turkish lawyer and politician (born 1927)

Minister of Labour
- In office 5 January 1961 – 3 March 1961
- President: Cemal Gürsel

Minister of National Education
- In office 2 March 1961 – 20 November 1961
- President: Cemal Gürsel

Personal details
- Born: 1900 Bozkış village, Uşak, Ottoman Empire
- Died: 13 December 2007 (aged 97–98)
- Party: Democrat Party; Nation Party; Republican Nation Party; Republican Villagers Nation Party; Republican People's Party
- Children: 4
- Education: Darülfünun
- Occupation: Lawyer

Ahmet Tahtakılıç (1909–2000) was a Turkish lawyer and politician. He served as a member of the Parliament, senator and held various cabinet posts in the early 1960s. He started his political career in the Democrat Party (DP) in 1946. After being part of right-wing political parties he became a member of the Republican People's Party (CHP) in 1973. He was among the founders of Human Rights Association which was established in 1986.

== Early life and education ==
He was born in Bozkış village of Uşak in 1909. His father, İbrahim Bey, was a representative of the Kuva-yi Milliye forces in Alaşehir and Uşak during the Turkish War of Independence and served at the Parliament following the establishment of Turkey.

Ahmet was a graduate of Darülfünun, precursor of Istanbul University, where he received a degree in law in 1930.

== Career and activities ==
Following his graduation Tahtakılıç joined the Ministry of Interior and worked in various capacities, including district governor. He also worked as a lawyer before he was elected as deputy from Kütahya for the DP in 1946. He became a member of the DP's General Administrative Board in 1947. He was among those who were fired from the DP in March 1948 due to their opposition. The others included Yusuf Kemal Tengirşenk, Enis Akaygen, Emin Sazak, Ahmet Oğuz, and Hasan Dinçer. Tahtakılıç became a member of the Nation Party shortly after his dismissal and served as the general secretary of the party. When the Nation Party was closed, he cofounded the Republican Nation Party in February 1954 and was elected as its chairman.

Tahtakılıç was the minister of labour in the cabinet formed following the military coup in May 1960. The cabinet was led by Cemal Gürsel who headed the military intervention, and Tahtakılıç held the post from 5 January 1961 to 3 March 1961. In the same cabinet he also served as minister of education between 2 March 1961 and 20 November 1961.

Tahtakılıç was a member of the Constituent Assembly of Turkey which lasted between 6 January 1961 and 24 October 1961 and was the representative of the Republican Villagers Nation Party. He was elected as a deputy from Uşak in the 1961 general elections. He left the Republican Nation Party in 1966. He joined the CHP in 1973. The same year he was elected as senator from Uşak and served at the Senate until 1980.

Following the military coup on 12 September 1980 Tahtakılıç retired from politics and worked as a lawyer. He was a cofounder of the Human Rights Association which was established in 1986. He published his memoirs with the title Dönüşü Olmayan Yol (Turkish: A Road of No Return) in 1989.

== Personal life and death ==
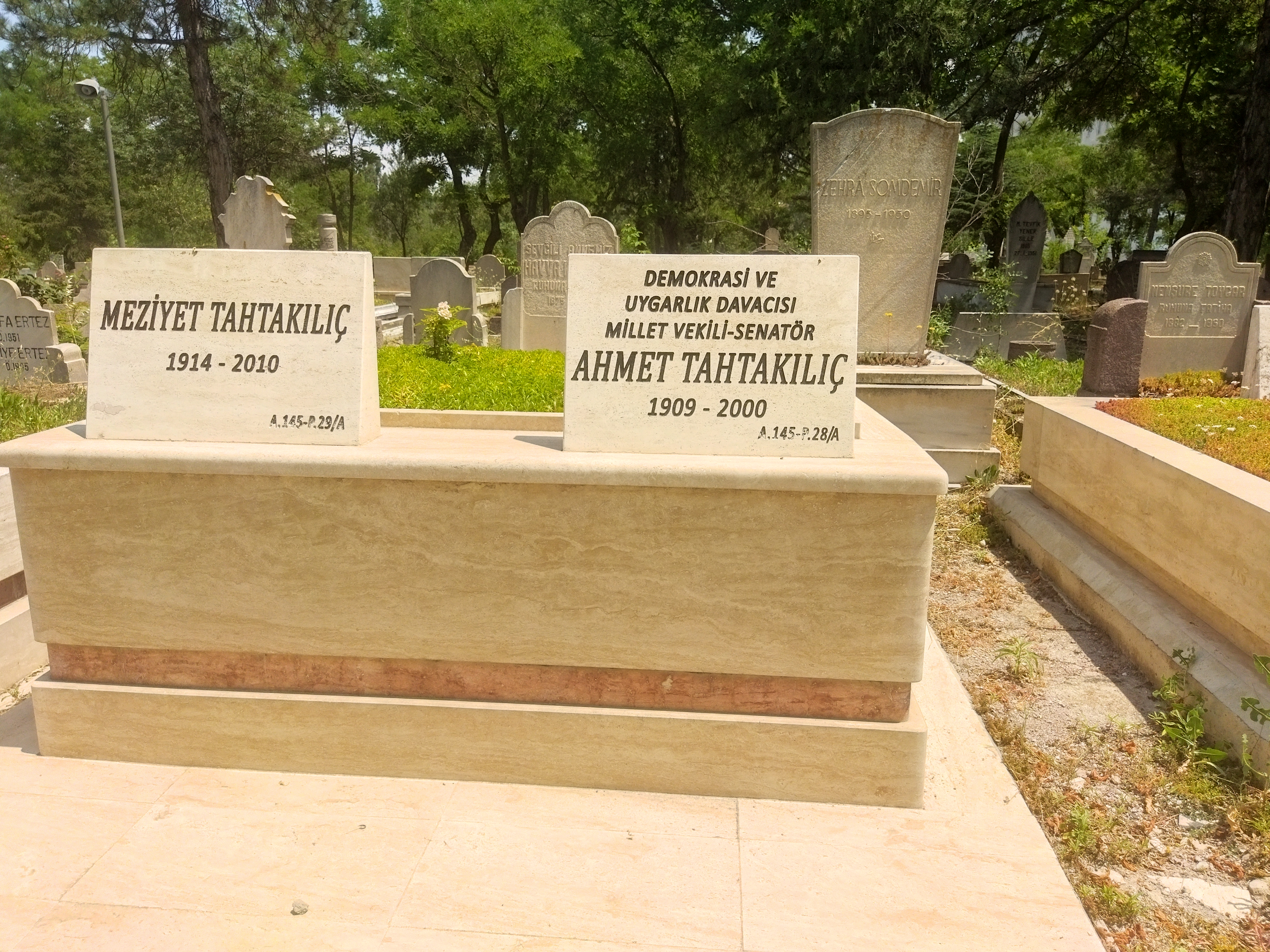
Grave of Ahmet Tahtakılıç in Cebeci Asri Cemetery, Ankara

Tahtakılıç was married and had four children.

Tahtakılıç died on 13 December 2000.
