= Naci Eldeniz =

Turkish officer and politician (1875–1948)

Naci Eldeniz 1309-P. 17
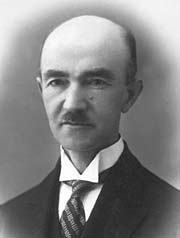
- Born: 1875; Bitola, Manastir Vilayet, Ottoman Empire (modern North Macedonia)
- Died: March 20, 1948 (aged 72–73); Ankara, Turkey
- Burial place: Ankara Asrî Mezarlığı; State Cemetery
- Children: Perihan Arıburun
- Military career
- Allegiance: Ottoman Empire; Turkey
- Service years: Ottoman Empire: 1893–1920; Turkey: 1921–1928
- Rank: Lieutenant general
- Commands: Chief aide-de-camp of Mehmed VI, Inspector of the military schools 7th Division, Inspector of the military schools, Inspector of the infantry machinguns, V Corps, member of the military court for generals
- Conflicts: Balkan Wars; First World War; Turkish War of Independence
- Other work: Member of the GNAT (Cebel-i Bereket); Member of the GNAT (Seyhan)

Abdüllâtif Naci Eldeniz (1875 – March 20, 1948) was an officer of the Ottoman Army, a general of the Turkish Army, and a politician of the Republic of Turkey.

== Works ==
- Tapsıra
- Transval
- Rus-Japon Harbi
- Mukden Muharebesi (translation)
- Sevk ve Muharebe Talimnamesi (translation)
- Rumeli Mersiyesi (poem)

== Medals and decorations ==
- Order of the Medjidie 2nd class
- Silver Medal of Imtiyaz
- Austria-Hungary Military Merit Medal (Austria-Hungary)
- Prussia Order of the Red Eagle 2nd class
- Prussia Order of the Crown (Prussia) 2nd class
- Medal of Independence with Red Ribbon & Citation

== See also ==
- List of high-ranking commanders of the Turkish War of Independence
