= List of chairmen of the Senate of Turkey =

Chairman of the Senate of the Republic
- Cumhuriyet Senatosu Başkanı
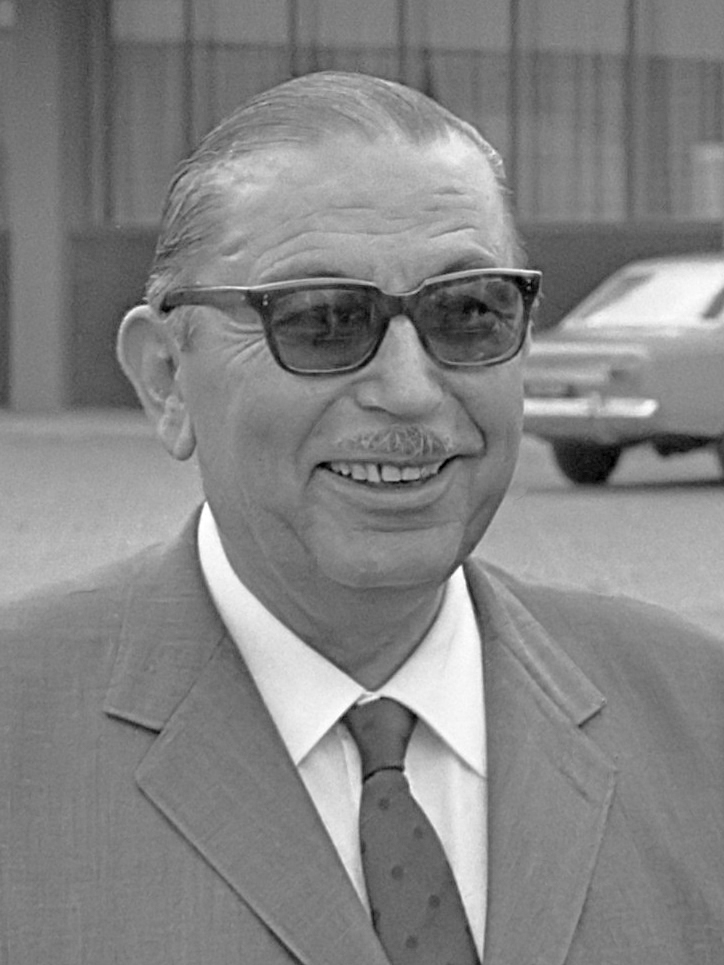
- İhsan Sabri Çağlayangil, last President of the Senate of the Republic
- Appointer: Senate of the Republic
- Formation: 26 October 1961
- First holder: Suat Hayri Ürgüplü
- Final holder: İhsan Sabri Çağlayangil
- Abolished: 12 September 1980

This article lists the chairmen of the Senate of Turkey, which existed as an upper house of the Turkish parliament between 1961 and 1980.

== List of chairmen ==
No.	Portrait	Name (Birth–Death)	Term of office			Political party
No.	Portrait	Name (Birth–Death)	Took office	Left office	Time in office	Political party
1		Suat Hayri Ürgüplü (1903–1981)	26 October 1961	6 November 1963	2 years, 11 days	Justice Party
2		Enver Aka (1901–1988)	6 November 1963	2 December 1965	2 years, 26 days	Justice Party
3		İbrahim Şevki Atasagun (1899–1984)	2 December 1965	19 November 1970	4 years, 352 days	Justice Party
4		Tekin Arıburun (1905–1993)	19 November 1970	14 June 1977	6 years, 207 days	Justice Party
5		Sırrı Atalay (1919–1985)	16 June 1977	6 November 1979	2 years, 143 days	Republican People's Party
6		İhsan Sabri Çağlayangil (1905–1993)	6 November 1979	12 September 1980	311 days	Justice Party

== See also ==
- Grand National Assembly of Turkey

- Speaker of the Grand National Assembly

- Senate of the Republic
