= Hüsamettin Cindoruk =

Turkish politician (1933–2026)

Acting President of Turkey
- In office 17 April 1993 – 16 May 1993
- Prime Minister: Süleyman Demirel
- Preceded by: Turgut Özal
- Succeeded by: Süleyman Demirel

Speaker of the Grand National Assembly
- In office 16 November 1991 – 1 October 1995
- Preceded by: İsmet Kaya Erdem
- Succeeded by: İsmet Sezgin

Member of the Grand National Assembly
- In office 14 November 1991 – 24 December 1995
- Constituency: Eskişehir (1991)
- In office 24 November 1983 – 16 October 1987
- Constituency: Samsun (1986)

Personal details
- Born: 8 June 1933 İzmir, Turkey
- Died: 11 April 2026 (aged 92) Istanbul, Turkey
- Resting place: Zincirlikuyu Cemetery
- Spouse: Dilek Cindoruk
- Children: 3
- Education: Ankara Atatürk High School; TED Ankara College, Ankara University, Law School

Ahmet Hüsamettin Cindoruk (8 June 1933 – 11 April 2026) was a Turkish politician and the 17th speaker of the Parliament of Turkey between 1991 and 1995. He was also the acting president of Turkey in 1993 and the leader of two political parties, notably of the True Path Party.

== Early life and education ==
Cindoruk was born in İzmir on 8 June 1933, to Turkish Cretan parents. He did all his studies in Ankara, graduated from the prestigious TED Ankara College and attended the University of Ankara, earning a degree in 1955 from the Law School. Following his graduation, he started practicing law.

== Professional career ==
Cindoruk rose to national attention at a relatively young age when, after the 1960 Turkish coup d'état, he became part of the defence team for the imprisoned, and later executed ex-Prime Minister Adnan Menderes and other Democratic Party notables. Despite the final verdict in the case, the one-year-long desperate efforts by the defence team gained widespread respect across Turkey.

== Political career ==
After the restoration of the civilian rule, he joined the Justice Party and two military coups later, after the 1980 military coup in Turkey, he became in 1985 the Secretary General of the True Path Party, a continuation of the Justice Party in the forced absence from politics of its leader Süleyman Demirel.

Cindoruk handed over the party leadership to Demirel after his return to politics. With the Democratic Party's election victory in 1991, he became the 17th speaker of the Parliament between 1991 and 1995. As such he had a strong impact when the Parliament voted to lift the immunity of the several pro-Kurdish parliamentarians of the People's Labor Party (HEP). He defended the MPs freedom of speech and was offended by the wording of the prosecutor who argued militants of the out-lawed Kurdistan Workers' Party had taken refuge in the parliaments building. Cindoruk therefore refused to send the petition to lift the immunity to the parliaments Justice and Constitutional Commission, and only his deputy Yılmaz Hocaoğlu sent it on in May 1992. In 1994, the immunity of seven MPs instead of the twenty-two the prosecutor demanded, were lifted. After Süleyman Demirel's election to the Presidency of the Republic vacated by Turgut Özal's death in 1993, he could have become the Prime Minister if he had not opted for a time to remain in his seat, thus opening the way for Tansu Çiller. When he eventually pushed his candidacy forward, Tansu Çiller had gained sufficient momentum within the party. He resigned from the speaker's position in early 1995 and launched his own political movement around Party for a Democratic Turkey (DTP), (Note: Not to be confused with the Democratic Society Party bearing the same initials.) but it did not register successful results in the general elections of 1996. Nevertheless, Cindoruk and his party took part in the government formed by Mesut Yılmaz during that electoral term and after bad results also in the elections of 1999, he quit the chairmanship of the party and left active politics. After years at 2009 he became the leader of Democrat Party and after several months he united Democratic Party and Motherland Party.

== Personal life and death ==
Cindoruk was married and had three children.

He died on 11 April 2026, at the age of 92. On 13 April 2026, he was interred at Zincirlikuyu Cemetery.

== Bibliography ==
- Biyografi.net – Biography of Hüsamettin Cindoruk (in Turkish)

Party political offices
Preceded by Yıldırım Avcı	Leader of the True Path Party; 1985–1987	Succeeded by Süleyman Demirel
New political party	Leader of the Democratic Turkey Party; 1997–1999	Succeeded by İsmet Sezgin
Preceded by Süleyman Soylu	Leader of the Democrat Party; 2009–2011	Succeeded by Namık Kemal Zeybek
Political offices
Preceded by Kaya Erdem	Speaker of the Grand National Assembly; 1991–1995	Succeeded by İsmet Sezgin
Preceded by Turgut Özal	President of Turkey; Acting; 1993	Succeeded by Süleyman Demirel
