= 1979 Turkish Senate election =

Senate elections were held in Turkey on 14 October 1979, with one-third of the 150 seats elected. They were the last elections to the Senate, which was abolished in 1982.

== Results ==
Party	Votes	%	Seats
Justice Party	2,215,053	46.82	33
Republican People's Party	1,378,224	29.13	12
National Salvation Party	459,040	9.70	4
Nationalist Movement Party	312,241	6.60	1
Republican Reliance Party	117,749	2.49	0
Socialist Workers' Party	62,105	1.31	0
Unity Party	55,774	1.18	0
Workers' Party	33,720	0.71	0
Socialist Revolution Party	33,548	0.71	0
Independents	63,093	1.33	0
Total	4,730,547	100.00	50
Total votes	4,847,156	–	
Registered voters/turnout	6,868,533	70.57	
Source: Nohlen et al.
