= Orhan Eyüpoğlu =

Turkish politician

Deputy Prime Minister
- In office 5 January 1978 – 12 November 1979
- Preceded by: Necmettin Erbakan
- In office 21 June 1977 – 21 July 1977
- Prime Minister: Bülent Ecevit
- Preceded by: Necmettin Erbakan
- Succeeded by: Necmettin Erbakan

Secretary General of the Republican People's Party
- In office 2 August 1973 – 21 January 1978
- Preceded by: Kamil Kırıkoğlu
- Succeeded by: Mustafa Üstündağ

Personal details
- Born: 1918 Istanbul, Ottoman Empire
- Died: 30 November 1980 (aged 62)

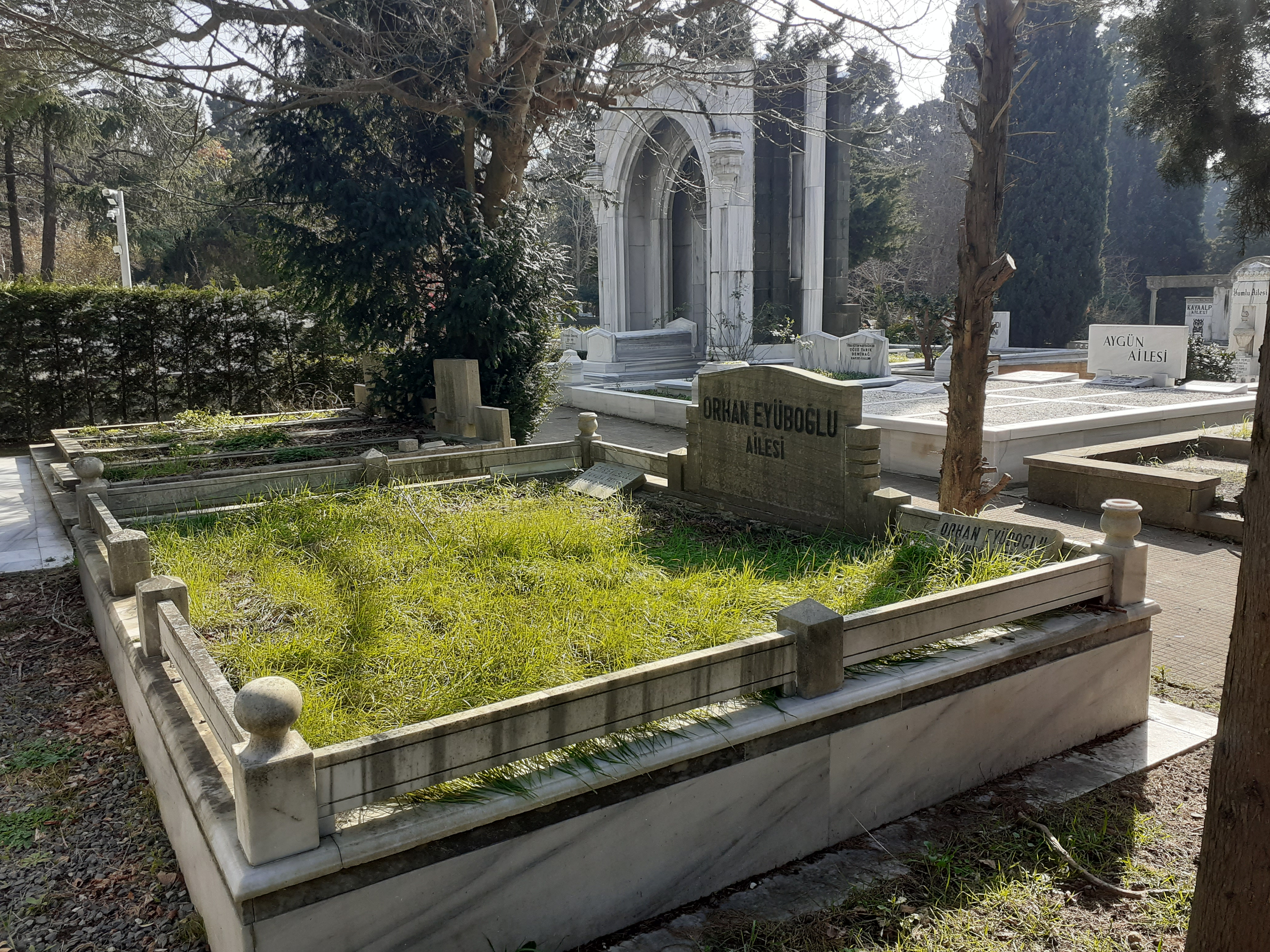
Grave of Orhan Eyüboğlu

Orhan Eyüpoğlu (1918 – 30 November 1980) was a Turkish politician. A graduate of Istanbul University's Faculty of Law, he was deputy director of the Istanbul Police force. In 1973 he was elected as the secretary general of the Republican People's Party defeating Turan Güneş and Deniz Baykal. He later served as the deputy prime minister in the 40th and 42nd governments. During his term in the 40th government he was a deputy from Istanbul.

Eyüpoğlu died of a heart attack on 30 November 1980.
