= Tekin Arıburun =

Turkish Senator and Army general

President of Turkey
- Acting
- In office 28 March 1973 – 6 April 1973
- Preceded by: Cevdet Sunay
- Succeeded by: Fahri Korutürk

President of the Senate of Turkey
- In office 19 November 1970 – 14 June 1977
- Preceded by: İbrahim Şevki Atasagun
- Succeeded by: Sırrı Atalay

Personal details
- Born: 3 October 1903 Ishtib, Ottoman Empire (modern day Štip, North Macedonia)
- Died: 13 August 1993 (aged 89) Istanbul, Turkey
- Resting place: Cebeci Military Martyr's Cemetery
- Spouse: Perihan Arıburun (m. 1940)
- Children: 2
- Education: Turkish Military Academy; Turkish Army War Institute
- Awards: U.S. Legion of Merit

Military service
- Allegiance: Turkey
- Branch/service: Turkish Air Force
- Years of service: 1925–1960
- Rank: General

Mehmet Tekin Arıburun (3 October 1903 – 13 August 1993) was a Turkish military officer and statesman. He was born in Ishtib, Kosovo Vilayet, Ottoman Empire (today Štip, part of North Macedonia). He was the last acting president to be born outside the territory of present-day Turkey.

His father was Hüseyin Avni.

He graduated from the Turkish Military College in 1925. He was sent to United Kingdom in 1929 to attend flying courses. In 1935, he graduated from Turkish Military Academy. He served as Commandant of the NATO Defense College from 1958 to 1959. He became an army general in 1959. He held the office of chief commander of Turkish Air Force. After 1960 Turkish coup d'état, he was forced into early retirement by the junta. He started his political life and elected as senator in 1961. He became the President of the Turkish Senate between 19 November 1970 and 14 June 1977.

He was the acting president of Turkey between 28 March 1973, and 6 April 1973, after Cevdet Sunay completed his seven-year term, until the election of Fahri Korutürk.

General Arıburun was a polyglot; he spoke English, German, French and Italian.

Military offices
Preceded by Hamdullah Suphi Göker	Commander of the Turkish Air Force; 1 May 1959–27 May 1960	Succeeded by İhsan Orgun
Political offices
Preceded by Cevdet Sunay	Acting President of Turkey; 29 March 1973 –6 April 1973	Succeeded by Fahri Korutürk
