= 40th government of Turkey =

Government of the Republic of Turkey (1977)

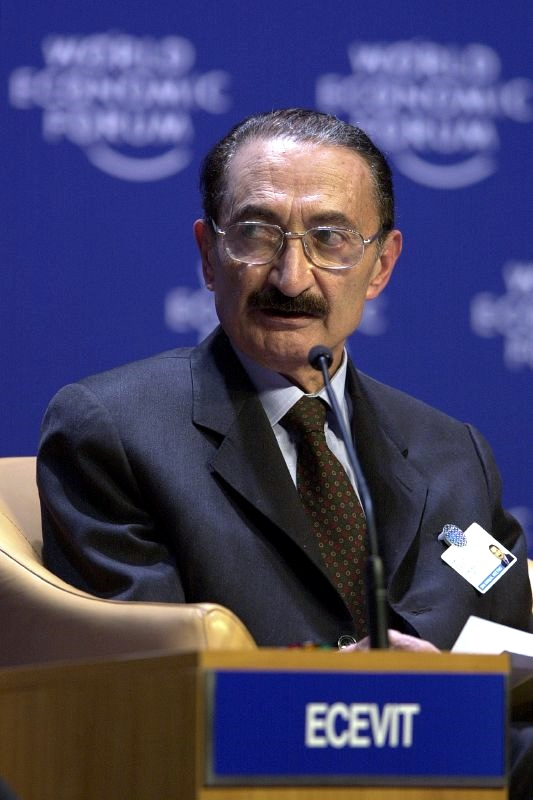
Bülent Ecevit

The 40th government of Turkey (21 June 1977 – 21 July 1977) was a short term (one month) government that governed Turkey in 1977. It was a minority government of Republican People's Party (CHP) led by Bülent Ecevit.

== The elections ==
In the elections held on 5 June 1977, CHP received 41% (highest percentage CHP ever reached after 1950) of the vote and became the first party. However, in the parliament, CHP gained only 213 seats out of 450. Other parties were reluctant to form a coalition with CHP. However, Ecevit, confident of his prestige, tried a minority government.

== The government ==
The members of the government are as follows:

| Title | Name | Party |
|---|---|---|
| Prime Minister | Bülent Ecevit | CHP |
| Deputy Prime Minister | Orhan Eyüboğlu | CHP |
Minister of State
| Minister of State | Turan Güneş | CHP |
| Minister of State | Lütfi Doğan | CHP |
| Minister of State | Kenan Bulutoğlu | CHP |
| Ministry of Justice | Selçuk Erverdi | CHP |
| Ministry of National Defense | Hasan Esat Işık | CHP |
| Ministry of the Interior | Necdet Uğur | CHP |
| Ministry of Foreign Affairs | Gündüz Ökçün | CHP |
| Ministry of Finance | Besim Üstünel | CHP |
| Ministry of National Education | Mustafa Üstündağ | CHP |
| Ministry of Public Works | Abdülkerim Zilan | CHP |
| Ministry of Commerce | Ziya Müezzinoğlu | CHP |
| Ministry of Health and Social Security | Celal Ertuğ | CHP |
| Ministry of Customs and Monopolies | Mehmet Can | CHP |
| Ministry of Food Agriculture and Husbandry | Fikret Gündoğan | CHP |
| Ministry of Transport | Erol Çevikçe | CHP |
| Ministry of Labour | Bahir Ersoy | CHP |
| Ministry of Social Security | Hayrettin Uysal | CHP |
| Ministry of Industry | Tarhan Erdem | CHP |
| Ministry of Culture and Tourism | Altan Öymen | CHP |
| Ministry of Construction and Settlement | Erol Tuncer | CHP |
| Ministry of Energy and Natural Resources | Neşet Akmandor | CHP |
| Ministry of Village Affairs and Cooperatives | Ali Topuz | CHP |
| Ministry of Forestry | Vecdi İlhan | CHP |
| Ministry of Youth and Sports | Yüksel Çakmur | CHP |

== Aftermath ==
In the voting at the Parliament on 3 July, the government lost a vote of confidence (217 vs 229).

| Preceded by 39th government of Turkey (Süleyman Demirel) | 40th Government of Turkey; 21 June 1977 – 21 July 1977 | Succeeded by 41st government of Turkey (Süleyman Demirel) |
