= Yusuf Tekin =

Turkish bureaucrat and politician (born 1970)

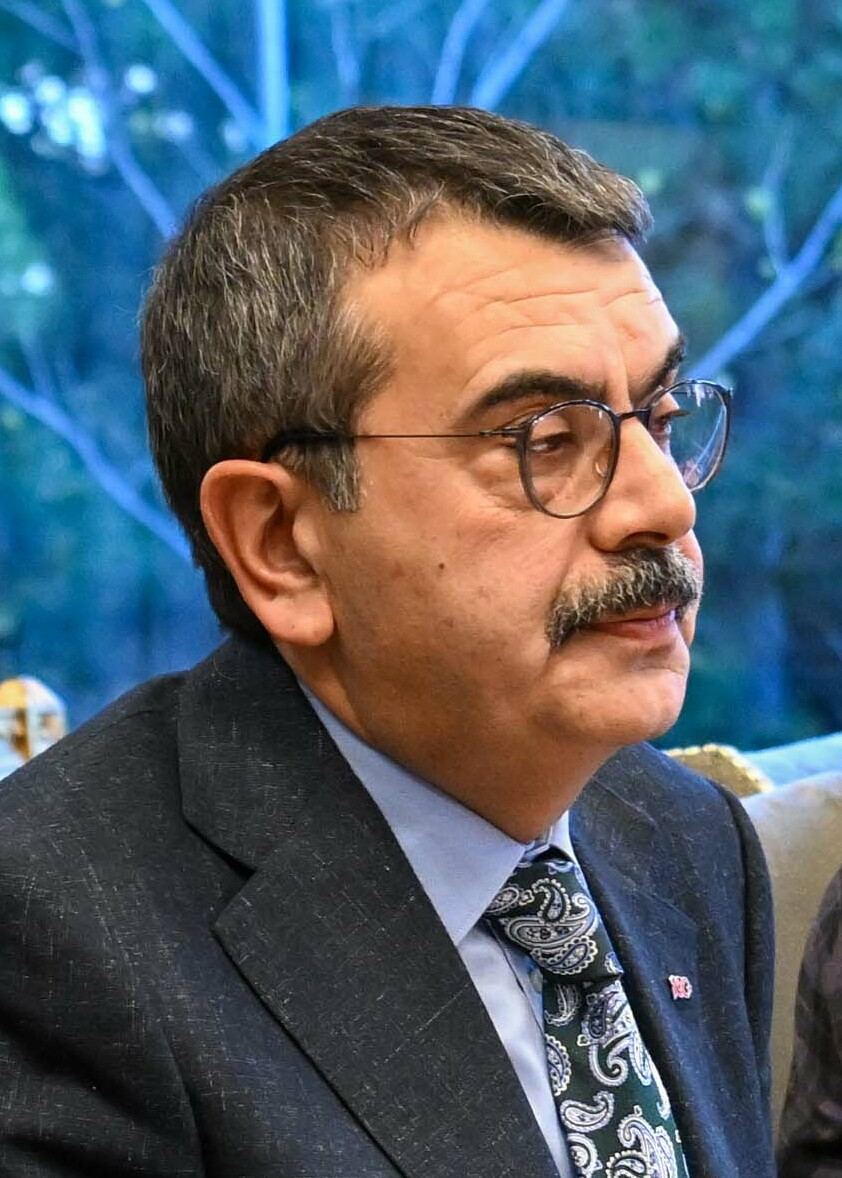
- Tekin in 2023

Minister of National Education
- Incumbent
- Assumed office 4 June 2023
- President: Recep Tayyip Erdoğan
- Preceded by: Mahmut Özer

Ankara Hacı Bayram Veli University Rector
- In office 8 September 2018 – 4 June 2023
- Preceded by: İbrahim Uslan
- Succeeded by: İlhan Üzülmez

Undersecretary to the Minister of National Education
- In office 28 May 2013 – 10 July 2018
- Minister: Nabi Avcı; İsmet Yılmaz
- Preceded by: Mehmet Emin Zararsız
- Succeeded by: Office abolished

Vice Minister of Youth and Sports
- In office 19 August 2011 – 28 May 2013
- Preceded by: Office founded
- Succeeded by: Metin Yılmaz

Personal details
- Born: 3 August 1970 (age 56) Erzurum, Turkey
- Party: Justice and Development Party
- Spouse: Ayşe Tekin
- Children: 3
- Education: Political Science
- Alma mater: Ankara University

Yusuf Tekin (born 3 August 1970) is a Turkish bureaucrat and politician. He is the Minister of National Education of the 67th government of Turkey. In 2014 he stated that mixed-sex education "isn't required." Tekin is married to Ayşe Tekin and has 3 children. He also adequately speaks English.
