= Mustafa Üstündağ (politician) =

Turkish politician

Minister of National Education
- In office 26 January 1974 – 17 November 1974
- Prime Minister: Bülent Ecevit
- Preceded by: Orhan Dengiz
- Succeeded by: Sefa Reisoğlu

Minister of National Education
- In office 21 June 1977 – 21 July 1977
- Prime Minister: Bülent Ecevit
- Preceded by: Ali Naili Erdem
- Succeeded by: Nahit Menteşe

Personal details
- Born: 1933 Seydişehir, Konya Province, Turkey
- Died: June 30, 1983 (aged 50) Konya Province, Turkey
- Party: Republican People's Party (CHP)
- Education: Gazi Institute for Education; University of Wisconsin
- Occupation: Teacher, Politician

Mustafa Üstündağ (1933–1983) was a Turkish school teacher, politician and former government minister.

== Early life ==
Mustafa Üstündağ was born in Ortakaraören village of Seydişehir ilçe (district) in Konya Province. After graduating from İvriz Village Institute in 1951, he served in various schools as a teacher. In 1960, he graduated from Gazi Institute for Education in Ankara. He obtained a Master's degree from the University of Wisconsin. He joined the academic staff of Hacettepe University.

== Political life ==
Mustafa Üstündağ joined the Republican People's Party (CHP) and in 1969 Turkish general elections he was elected a deputy from Konya Province. In the 1973 and 1977, he was reelected. Beginning 1970, he represented CHP in the European Council. In 1971 he was elected as the general secretary of CHP. Both in the 37th and the 40th government of Turkey, he served as the Minister of National Education. During his term as minister, he launched the system of Distance education. He tried to establish the equality in education.

== Later years ==
His political life ended on 12 September 1980 by the 1980 Turkish coup d'état. On 30 June 1983 he died in a car accident. He was laid to rest in Konya.

Preceded by Orhan Dengiz	Minister of National Education; 26 January 1974 – 17 November 1974	Succeeded by Sefa Reisoğlu
Preceded by Ali Naili Erdem	Minister of National Education; 21 June 1977 – 21 July 1977	Succeeded by Nahit Menteşe
