= Tarhan Erdem =

Turkish politician (1933–2022)

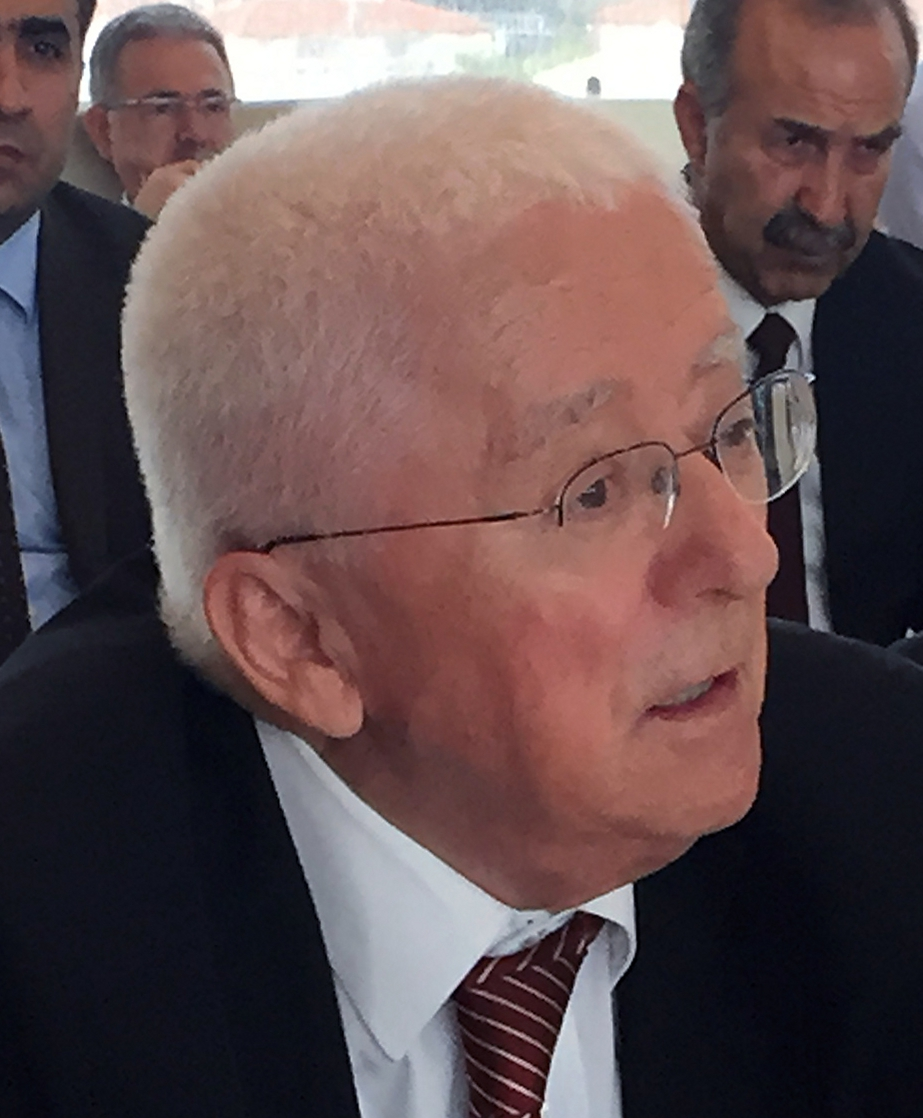

General Secretary of the Republican People's Party
- In office 6 July 1999 – 13 September 2000
- Leader: Altan Öymen
- Preceded by: Adnan Keskin
- Succeeded by: Oya Araslı

Minister of Industry and Technology
- In office 21 June 1977 – 21 July 1977
- Prime Minister: Bülent Ecevit
- Preceded by: Abdülkerim Doğru
- Succeeded by: Oğuzhan Asiltürk

Member of the Grand National Assembly
- In office 5 June 1977 – 12 September 1980
- Constituency: Istanbul (1977)

Personal details
- Born: 1933 Kurucaşile, Turkey
- Died: 8 June 2022 (aged 89) Bodrum, Muğla
- Resting place: Aşiyan Asri Cemetery, Istanbul
- Party: Republican People's Party (CHP) (former)
- Education: Istanbul University
- Profession: Politician, researcher

Tarhan Erdem (1933 – 8 June 2022) was a Turkish politician who was the President of KONDA Research and Consultancy, an opinion polling company. He was a member of the Republican People's Party (CHP) and briefly served as the Minister of Industry and Technology during the short-lived 40th government of Turkey headed by CHP leader Bülent Ecevit between 21 June and 21 July 1977.

== Early life and career ==
Erdem was born in Kurucaşile, Bartın, in 1933. He graduated from Istanbul University Faculty of Civil Engineering in 1959. He joined the Republican People's Party (CHP) in 1953 at the age of 20. Between 1959 and 1995, he served in various positions such as director and general co-ordinator in numerous companies including the Milliyet newspaper.

== Political career ==
Erdem was elected as a Member of Parliament for the electoral district of Istanbul in the general election of 1977. The CHP won 41% of the vote, their highest vote share since 1950, but failed to win a parliamentary majority. The party's leader Bülent Ecevit attempted to form a minority government.

Erdem was appointed the Minister of Industry and Technology in Ecevit's government, taking office on 21 June 1977. The government, however, failed to achieve a vote of confidence in Parliament, resulting in its dissolution on 21 July 1977 after just one month in office. The government was succeeded by a nationalist coalition formed by Justice Party (AP) leader Süleyman Demirel, which is often referred to as the Second Nationalist Front. Erdem's membership of the Grand National Assembly came to an end after Parliament was dissolved on 12 September 1980 by General Kenan Evren, who led a coup d'état against the government.

== KONDA ==
After leaving the CHP, Erdem became a staunch critic of the party's new leader Deniz Baykal. His opinion polling company, KONDA, is known to be close to the Justice and Development Party (AKP) government. KONDA's predictions for the 2007 and 2010 constitutional referendum were praised for being almost exactly accurate, however the company's predictions for the 2009 local election was widely seen as inaccurate. After the company's predictions for the 2014 presidential election emerged to have grossly overestimated Recep Tayyip Erdoğan's vote, KONDA issued a public letter of apology.

== Death ==
Erdem died on 8 June 2022 in Bodrum, Muğla following a heart disease. Three days later, he was buried at Aşiyan Asri Cemetery.

== See also ==
- Bülent Ecevit
- Opinion polls in Turkey
