= 25th government of Turkey =

Government of the Republic of Turkey (1961)

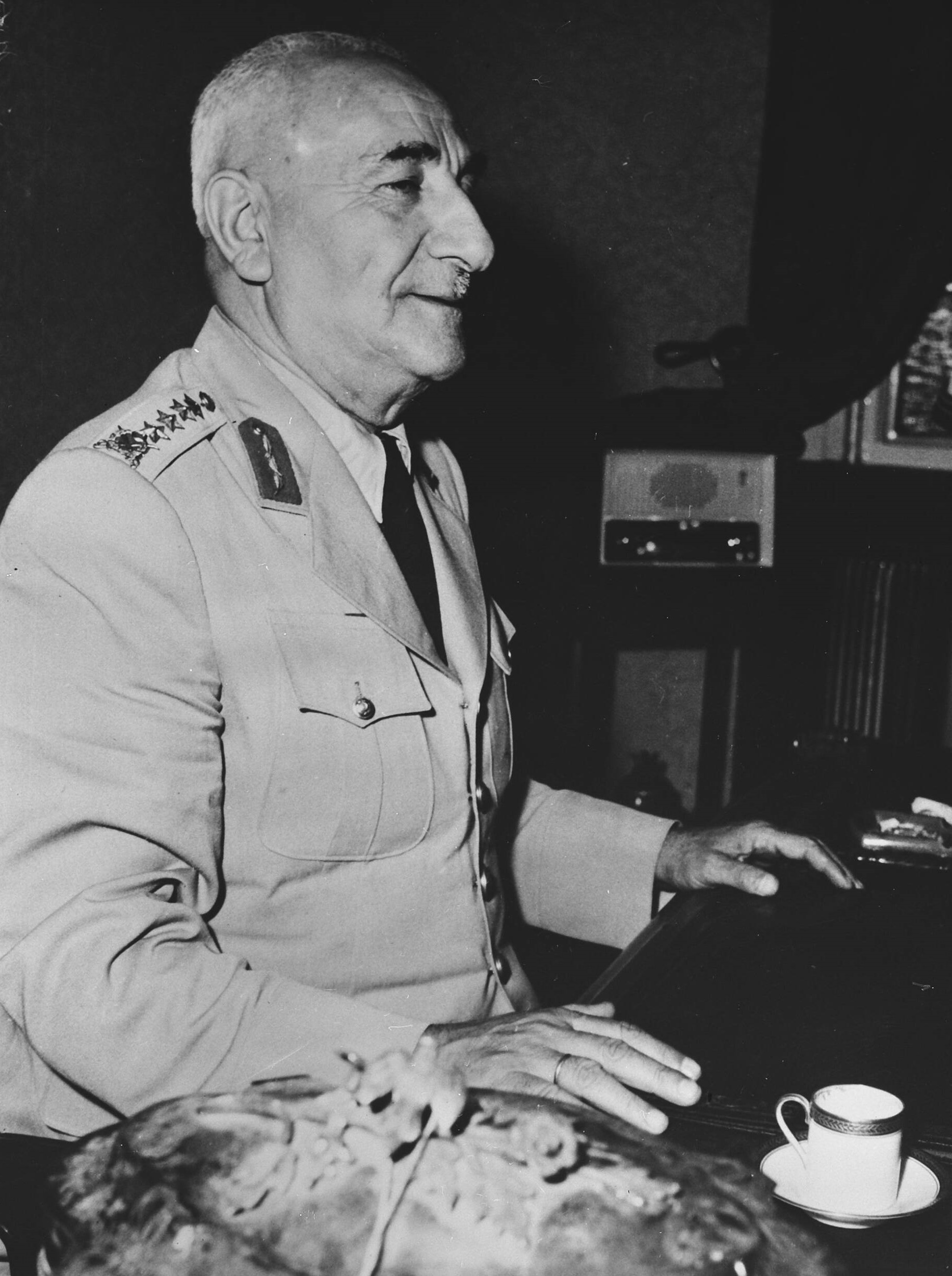
Cemal Gürsel

The 25th government of Turkey (5 January 1961 – 20 November 1961) was a government in the history of Turkey. It is also called the Second Gürsel government.

== Background ==
In 1961 the constituent assembly of Turkey was formed. Cemal Gürsel the prime minister of the previous government resigned to form a new government to serve together with the constituent assembly.

== The government ==
In the list below, the cabinet members who served only a part of the cabinet's lifespan are shown in the column "Notes".

Title	Name	Notes
Prime Minister	Cemal Gürsel	
Deputy Prime Minister	Muharrem Kızıloğlu; Fahri Özdilek	4 February 1961 – 2 March 1961; 2 March 1961 – 20 November 1961
Minister of State
Minister of State	Hayri Mumcuoğlu; Adnan Erzi	5 January 1961 – 26 August 1961
Minister of State	Nasır Zeytinoğlu; Sıtkı Ulay	5 January 1961 – 4 February 1961; 3 March 1961 – 20 November 1961
Ministry of Justice	Ekrem Tüzemen; Kemal Türkoğlu	5 January 1961 – 17 August 1961; 17 August 1961 – 20 November 1961
Ministry of National Defense	Muzaffer Alankuş	5 Jan 1961 – 3 July 1961
Ministry of the Interior	İhsan Kızıloğlu; Nasır Zeytinoğlu	5 January 1961 – 4 February 1961; 4 February 1961; 4 February 1961 – 20 November 1961
Ministry of Foreign Affairs	Selim Sarper	
Ministry of Finance	Kemal Kurdaş	
Ministry of National Education	Turhan Feyzioğlu; Ahmet Tahtakılıç	5 January 1961 – 7 February 1961; 2 March 1961 – 20 November 1961
Ministry of Construction and Settlement	Fehmi Yavuz; Rüştü Özal	5 January 1961 – 6 February 1961; 6 February 1961 – 20 November 1961
Ministry of Public Works	Mukbil Gökdoğan	
Ministry of Health and Social Security	Nusret Karasu; Ragıp Üner	30 May 1960 – 27 August 1960; 6 September 1960 – 5 January 1961
Ministry of Customs and Monopolies	Fethi Aşkın	
Ministry of Transport	Orhan Mersinli	
Ministry of Industry	Şahap Kocatopçu; İhsan Soyak	5 January 1961 – 14 April 1961; 29 April 1961 – 20 November 1961
Ministry of Commerce	Mehmet Baydur	
Ministry of Agriculture	Osman Tosun	
Ministry of Labour	Ahmet Tahtakılıç; Cahit Talas	5 January 1961 – 2 March 1961; 2 March 1961 – 20 November 1961
Ministry Tourism and Press	Cihat Baban; Sahir Kurutluoğlu	5 January 1961 – 29 August 1961; 2 September 1961 – 20 November 1961

== Aftermath ==
The general elections were held on 15 October 1961, and Cemal Gürsel was elected as the new president of Turkey on 26 October 1961. According to the constitution, he resigned as prime minister. After a brief period in which Fahri Özdilek became the acting prime minister, a new civilian government led by İsmet İnönü was formed.

Preceded by 24th government of Turkey (Cemal Gürsel)	25 Government of Turkey; 5 January 1961 – 20 November 1961	Succeeded by 26th government of Turkey (İsmet İnönü)
