= Enis Akaygen =

Turkish politician (1881–1956)

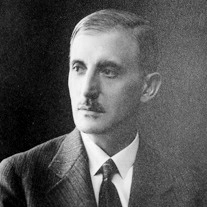

Personal details
- Born: 1881 Plovdiv, Ottoman Empire
- Died: 1956 (aged 74–75) Yakacık, İstanbul, Turkey

Enis Akaygen (1881–1956) was a Turkish diplomat, politician and a self-taught economist.

== Biography ==
He was born in Plovdiv in 1881. He was named as the ambassador of Turkey to the Soviet Union in 1925. He served as the ambassador of Turkey to Iran between 1934 and 1939. He was the Turkish ambassador to Greece from October 1939 to July 1945.

Akaygen became a member of the Democrat Party in 1946 and was elected as a deputy from Istanbul. He was among those who were fired from the DP in March 1948 due to their opposition. The others included Yusuf Kemal Tengirşenk, Ahmet Tahtakılıç, Emin Sazak, Ahmet Oğuz, and Hasan Dinçer.

Akaygen died in Yakacık, İstanbul, in 1956.
