= Cahit Talas =

Turkish academic (1917–1006)

- Born: 1917; Trabzon, Ottoman Empire
- Died: 14 October 2006 (aged 88–89); Ankara, Turkey
- Resting place: Karşıyaka Cemetery, Ankara
- Education: Ankara University; University of Geneva
- Scientific career
- Fields: Social politics; Economy
- Workplaces: Ankara University
- Thesis: La Legislation du Travail Industriel en Turquie (1947)

Cahit Talas (1917 – 14 October 2006) was a Turkish academic who was the dean of Ankara University's Faculty of Political Science for two terms. He served as the minister of labor between 1960 and 1961. He is known for being the pioneer of social politics in Turkey.

== Early life and education ==
Talas was born in Trabzon, Ottoman Empire, in 1917. After his secondary education he started his university education at the Faculty of Political Science at Ankara University in 1935 and graduated in 1938. Following his graduation he was sent by the Ministry of Finance to France to pursue his doctorate studies in 1938, but he could not complete his education due to the outbreak of World War II and had to return to Turkey in 1940.

Talas restarted his doctorate studies in 1943 and received his Ph.D. from the University of Geneva in 1947. The title of his thesis was La Legislation du Travail Industriel en Turquie (French: Industrial Labor Legislation in Türkiye). Talas reported later that Anthony Babel and Edgard Milhaud, his professors at the University of Geneva, affected his selection of this topic.

== Career and activities ==
Talas worked at the Ministry of Finance and then at the Ministry of Labor where he worked as research council rapporteur until 1953 when he joined the Faculty of Political Science at Ankara University. The same year he was promoted to associated professor and to full professor in 1958. He first taught social economics course at the Faculty.

Talas was named as the minister of labor to the first cabinet of President Cemal Gürsel announced on 28 May 1960. The cabinet was formed immediately after the military coup of 27 May 1960 which ended the rule of Democrat Party. Talas was reappointed to the same post in 1961 to the second cabinet of Cemal Gürsel. Talas held the post for one year and returned to his teaching post at Ankara University. During his ministerial post Talas signed the European Social Charter on behalf of Turkey. He also played a significant role in the inclusion of the right to strike in the new Constitution of Turkey.

Talas served as the dean of the Faculty of Political Science for two terms: from 1960 to 1961 and from 1970 to 1971. Following the 1971 memorandum he was arrested and imprisoned for a while along with other leading academics from Ankara University, including Mümtaz Soysal and Bahri Savcı. Talas retired from university in 1983.

Talas was a member of the Republican People's Party. He was also involved in the formation of the Social Democracy Party in 1983 after his retirement. He was member of various associations and foundations, including Turkish Human Rights Association, Turkish Cooperative Association, Turkish Economic Association, Atatürkist Thought Association and History Foundation.

=== Work and views ===
Talas published many books and articles in Turkish and in French. He was among the contributors of the Forum magazine.

For Talas the goal of the 1960 coup was to reestablish social justice in order to transform the Turkish society. He was one of the supporters of the right to strike in Turkey and published many articles on this issue in various newspapers. He argued that increasing worker wages has positive effects on industrial development. He also regarded the collaboration between employers and employees as one of the prerequisites of the economic development.

== Death ==
Talas died of heart failure at his home in Ankara on 14 October 2006. After the ceremony at the Faculty of Political Sciences and funeral prayers in the Kocatepe Mosque he was buried in the Karşıyaka Cemetery on 17 October.

== Legacy ==
An annual prize in social politics was inaugurated by the Faculty of Political Science at Ankara University in 2012 in memory of Cahit Talas.
