= Emirler, Gölbaşı =

Emirler
- Neighbourhood
- Location in Turkey Emirler (Turkey Central Anatolia)
- Coordinates: 39°25′N 32°55′E
- Country: Turkey
- Province: Ankara
- District: Gölbaşı
- Elevation: 1,190 m (3,900 ft)
- Population (2022): 726
- Time zone: UTC+3 (TRT)
- Postal code: 06830
- Area code: 0312

Emirler is a neighbourhood in the municipality and district of Gölbaşı of Ankara Province, Turkey. Its population is 726 (2022). Its distance to Ankara is 65 kilometres (40 mi). The village is situated at the west of the Turkish state highway D.750. There is a short wave radio transmitter of Voice of Turkey in 5 km West of the village. The residents are of Turkmen origin.
