= Metallurgical and Materials Engineering =

- Discipline: Metallurgy, Materials science
- Language: English
- Edited by: Marija Korać, Milan Jovanović, Vaso Manojlović

Publication details
- History: 1995-present
- Publisher: Association of Metallurgical Engineers of Serbia (Serbia)
- Frequency: quarterly
- Open access: Yes
- License: CC-BY

Standard abbreviations
- ISO 4: Metall. Mater. Eng.

Indexing
- ISSN: 2217-8961

Links
- Journal homepage; Journal page at publisher's website

Metallurgical and Materials Engineering is a peer-reviewed Open Access scientific journal, published by the Association of Metallurgical Engineers of Serbia. The first name of the journal was Metalurgija, published in 1995. The new name was adopted in 2012. The journal publishes contributions on fundamental and engineering aspects in the area of metallurgy and materials.

The journal publishes full length research papers, preliminary communications, reviews, and technical papers.
