= Nevzat Ayaz =

Turkish politician (1930–2020)

Nevzat Ayaz (5 October 1930 – 3 December 2020) was a Turkish civil servant and True Path Party politician. He was governor of Istanbul Province from 1979 to 1988. He was elected to the Grand National Assembly of Turkey in 1991, and was Minister of National Defense (1991–1993) and Minister of Education (1993–1995).

Ayaz featured in Mehmet Eymür's controversial 1987 MİT Report that wrote about high-ranking civil servants and politicians such as Ayaz, Ünal Erkan and Mehmet Ağar, alleging connections with the Turkish mafia.

Ayaz died on 3 December 2020, at the age of 90.
