= Ali Naili Erdem =

Turkish lawyer and politician (born 1927)

Personal details
- Born: 17 February 1927 (age 99) Kemalpaşa, İzmir, Turkey
- Party: Democrat Party; Justice Party
- Education: Ankara University
- Occupation: Lawyer

Ali Naili Erdem (born 17 February 1927) is a Turkish lawyer, writer, poet and politician who held various cabinet posts in the 1960s and 1970s. He was a member of the Parliament for the Justice Party from 1961 to 1980.

== Early life and education ==
He was born in Kemalpaşa, İzmir, on 17 February 1927. After completing his primary and secondary education in İzmir he received a degree in law from Ankara University in 1951.

== Career and activities ==
Following his graduation Erdem worked as a lawyer in his hometown until 1961. He also served in the İzmir branch of the ruling Democrat Party during this period. He joined the Justice Party and was elected a deputy from Izmir. Erdem won his seat in the following elections. His term at the Parliament ended on 12 September 1980 when a military coup took place. He was the deputy chairman of the Justice Party's parliamentary group between 1962 and 1964.

Erdem was appointed minister of industry in 1964. He was named as the minister of labour on 27 November 1965, succeeding İhsan Sabri Çağlayangil in the post. Erdem's tenure ended on 8 December 1968 when Turgut Toker was named as the minister of labour. Erdem was again appointed minister of labour on 15 April 1973 to the cabinet led by Prime Minister Naim Talu. Erdem's successor in the post was A. Rıza Uzuner. Erdem served in the post until 26 January 1974 when Önder Sav was named as the minister of labour.

Erdem was appointed the minister of education on 31 March 1975 and remained in office until 1977. The cabinet was headed by the leader of Justice Party Süleyman Demirel.

Erdem was part of the inner circle of Süleyman Demirel. Erdem was also close to Alparslan Türkeş, the leader of the Nationalist Movement Party. During his tenure as minister of national education Türkeş's supporters were employed at the Ministry.

Erdem was one of the politicians who were arrested after the 1980 military coup. He was in Paris, France, on the day of military coup and returned to Turkey on 18 September. He was arrested at Çiğli Airport and was sent to Ankara later. He was detained in Zincirbozan, Çanakkale. He retired from politics following this incident.

Erdem published his articles and poems in different media outlets from 1952. He was a contributor to Tercüman between 1967 and 1989. He is the author of two poetry books. He also published his memoirs entitled Siyasetin Yollarında in 2004.
