= Opinion polls in Turkey =

Public research surveys in Turkey

Opinion polls in Turkey (Turkish: anketler) are conducted by several companies which vary in terms of political affiliations and sampling techniques. They usually conduct polls in relation to voting intentions of the electorate during elections. Results of such polls tend to vary widely, usually due to political bias and alleged manipulation. In some cases, such as during the 2014 presidential election held on 10 August, they have been criticised for their inaccuracy. The leader of the KONDA polling company issued an apology for their inaccuracy on 15 August 2014. On a notable occasion on 17 March 2014, just before the local elections, a poll conducted by the ruling Justice and Development Party (AKP) put the opposition Republican People's Party (CHP) in the lead. This poll, like several others conducted before the local elections, did not reflect the outcome of the vote, which again put the verifiability of Turkish opinion polls in doubt.

== List of polling companies ==
A list of major polling companies in Turkey is as follows.

Company	Formation	Owners
A&G	1997	Tarhan Erdem (owner); Adil Gür (Manager)
ANAR	1998	Beşir Atalay
Andy-AR	1999	Faruk Acar
Denge	-	Hasan Basri Yıldız
Estima	2010	Hasan Tanla
GENAR	1997	see notes
Gezici	2003	Murat Gezici; Uğur Dündar
KAMAR	1987	Murat Doğan
Konda	1986	Tarhan Εrdem; Bekir Ağırdır
Konsensus	2001	Murat Sarı
MetroPOLL	2009	Özer Sencar
Optimar	-	Hilmi Daşdemir
ORC	-	Mehmet Sefa Posteki
POLLMARK	2003	see notes
SONAR	-	Hakan Bayrakçı
Verso	1987	Erhan Göksel
