= Sırrı Atalay =

Former Turkish politician

Sırrı Atalay (1919–1985) was a Turkish civil servant and politician.

Born in Pasinler, Erzurum vilayet (Now Erzurum Province), in 1919, he graduated from Ankara University, Law School. He served as a judge and a lawyer in various cities.

He joined Republican People's Party (CHP) and was elected as MP from Kars Province in the 9th Parliament of Turkey. He kept his seat in the next four parliamentary terms. In 1961 he was elected as senator from Kars Province up to 1980.

During the 28th government of Turkey he was appointed as the Minister of Justice between 16 December 1964 – 29 February 1965. Between 16 June 1977 – 6 November 1979 he was elected as the President of the Turkish Senate. On 1 June 1983 he was one of the former politicians who were temporarily taken under custody in a camp named Zincirbozan for their political activities during the military rule.

He died in 1985. He was married and father of one.
