= Zonguldak Bülent Ecevit University =

Public university in Zonguldak, Turkey

Coordinates: 41°27′04″N 31°45′46″E

- Other names: ZBEU
- Type: Public
- Established: 11 July 1992
- President: İsmail Hakkı Özölçer
- Students: 37,200
- Location: Zonguldak, Turkey
- Colors: Red, blue, green, white
- Website: w3.beun.edu.tr

Zonguldak Bülent Ecevit University (Turkish: Zonguldak Bülent Ecevit Üniversitesi, formerly Zonguldak Karaelmas University) is a state university located in Zonguldak, Turkey. The university was founded in 1992 with a primary focus on education in Mining and Engineering.

== History ==
The university was established in Zonguldak in accordance with the Law no. 3837 issued on July 11, 1992, and was incorporated as “Zonguldak Karaelmas University” on January 1, 1993. In order to exploit the coal mines in the Black Sea basin by a technically educated staff, a School of Mine Engineering was established in 1924 in Zonguldak, however, it was later closed and was replaced by a Vocational School of Mining and Mine Foremen which then became the Technical School of Mining in 1949. This institution was moved to Istanbul in 1961. With the Law no. 165 “Law for Opening a New Technical School in Zonguldak” issued in 1962, this technical school was converted into "The State Academy of Engineering and Architecture" with Law no. 1184, while buildings were under construction.

The academy, which consisted of Mining, Mechanics, Electricity and Construction departments in accordance with the Law no. 1184, became The Faculty of Engineering which consisted of Mine Engineering and Mechanical Engineering departments in accordance with the Statutory Decree no. 41 issued in 1981, and then merged with Hacettepe University under the name of Zonguldak Faculty of Engineering on 20 June 1982. With the foundation of Zonguldak Karaelmas University in accordance with Law no. 3837, this Faculty which forms the basis of the university, Zonguldak Vocational School, Alaplı Vocational School and Hacettepe University Zonguldak Faculty of Economics and Administrative Sciences under the name of “Çaycuma Faculty of Economics and Administrative Sciences” merged with the university. Then the name Çaycuma Faculty of Economics and Administrative Sciences was altered to the Faculty of Economics and Administrative Sciences on December 13, 2005.

In addition, the Zonguldak School of Health Services, the Bartın School of Health Services and the Karabük School of Health Services have been established in accordance with the protocol between the Turkish Ministry of Health and the Council of Higher Education in the university; however, instruction is given only in Zonguldak Vocational School of Health Services.

The Bartın Faculty of Forestry, the Devrek Faculty of Arts and Sciences, the Karabük Faculty of Technical Education and the Faculty of Medicine are within the Foundation Law. The Devrek Faculty of Arts and Sciences was altered to the Faculty of Arts and Sciences on 13 December 2005. The Ereğli Faculty of Education established on 18 January 1995, the Zonguldak School of Health Services established on 2 November 1996 and the Fethi Toker Faculty of Fine Arts and Design, the School of Maritime Business and Management, was established on 12 October 2005 and the Karabük Faculty of Arts and Sciences and the Karabük Faculty of Engineering were established on 18 December 2005.

The State Conservatory was established in accordance with the decision taken in the Council of Higher Education's meeting on 5 March 2004 and the Gökçebey Mithat-Mehmet Çanakçı Vocational School was established in accordance with the decision given in the meeting on 5 May 2005.

Since the establishment of the Faculty of Dentistry on 13 February 2008 and the Faculty of Fine Arts on 26 August 2008, there have been 14 Faculties, 4 Schools, 9 Vocational Schools and a State Conservatory in Zonguldak Karaelmas University.

The university was named after Turkish Prime Minister Bülent Ecevit in 2012.

== Academic units ==
=== Faculties & schools ===
==== Faculties ====
- Faculty of Medicine
- Faculty of Dentistry
- Faculty of Pharmacy
- Faculty of Engineering
  - Department of Biomedical Engineering
  - Department of Computer Engineering
  - Department of Computer Engineering (Evening)
  - Department of Environmental Engineering
  - Department of Environmental Engineering (Evening)
  - Department of Electrical and Electronics Engineering
  - Department of Electrical and Electronics Engineering (Evening)
  - Department of Geomatics (Geodesy and Photogrammetry Engineering)
  - Department of Food Engineering
  - Department of Civil Engineering
  - Department of Civil Engineering (Evening)
  - Department of Geological Engineering
  - Department of Mining Engineering
  - Department of Mechanical Engineering
  - Department of Mechanical Engineering (Evening)
  - Department of Metallurgical Engineering
- Ereğli Faculty of Education
  - Department of Science Education
  - Department of Elementary School Religious Culture and Moral Knowledge Education
  - Department of Elementary School Religious Culture and Moral Knowledge Education (Evening)
  - Department of Elementary School Mathematics Education
  - Department of Preschool Education
  - Department of Preschool Education (Evening)
  - Department of Guidance and Psychological Counseling
  - Department of Guidance and Psychological Counseling (Evening)
  - Department of Primary School Education
  - Department of Primary School Education (Evening)
  - Department of Social Sciences Education
  - Department of Turkish Language Education
  - Department of Turkish Language Education (Evening)
  - Department of Mentally Handicapped Education
  - Department of Mentally Handicapped Education (Evening)
- Faculty of Arts and Sciences
  - Department of Archeology
  - Department of Biology
  - Department of Biology (Evening)
  - Department of Physics
  - Department of English Language and Literature
  - Department of Chemistry
  - Department of Chemistry (Evening)
  - Department of Mathematics
  - Department of Mathematics (Evening)
  - Department of Molecular Biology and Genetics
  - Department of Sociology
  - Department of History
  - Department of Turkish Language and Literature
  - Department of Turkish Language and Literature (Evening)
- Faculty of Fine Arts
  - Department of Painting
- Faculty of Economics and Administrative Sciences
  - Department of Labor Economics and Industrial Relations
  - Department of Economics
  - Department of Economics (Evening)
  - Department of Business Administration
  - Department of Business Administration (Evening)
  - Department of Public Finance
  - Department of Public Finance (Evening)
  - Department of Political Science and Public Administration
  - Department of Political Science and Public Administration (Evening)
  - Department of International Commerce and Business Administration
- Faculty of Theology
  - Department of Elementary School Religious Culture and Moral Knowledge Education
  - Department of Elementary School Religious Culture and Moral Knowledge Education (Evening)
  - Department of Theology
  - Department of Theology (Evening)
- Faculty of Communication
  - Department of Journalism
  - Department of Public Relations and Publicity
  - Department of Radio, Cinema and Television

== Affiliations ==
The university is a member of the Caucasus University Association.
