= Lütfi Doğan (politician, born 1927) =

Turkish academic and politician (1927–2018)

Minister of State
- In office 21 June 1977 – 27 July 1977
- Prime Minister: Bülent Ecevit

Personal details
- Born: 1927 Ermenek, Karaman, Turkey
- Died: 23 January 2018 (aged 90–91) Ankara, Turkey
- Resting place: Cebeci cemetery
- Party: Republican People's Party
- Education: Ankara University

Lütfi Doğan (1927–2018) was a Turkish academic, theologian and politician. He served as the director of the Directorate of Religious Affairs from 1972 to 1976. Then he joined the Republican People's Party (CHP) and became minister of state in the cabinet led by Bülent Ecevit in 1977.

== Early life and education ==
He was born in Ermenek, Karaman, in 1927. He was a graduate of the School of Language and History – Geography, Ankara University, where he obtained a degree in Arabic and Persian languages. Then he studied Arabic language and Islamic sciences at Damascus University, Syria. He received his Ph.D. from the School of Divinity at Ankara University.

== Career and activities ==
Following his graduation Doğan joined the School of Divinity at Ankara University as a research assistant.

After serving as a regional preacher and provincial mufti in Ankara, Doğan served as a member of the Advisory and Religious Works Examination Board and a member of the Supreme Council of Religious Affairs. He was named as the director of Religious Affairs on 26 August 1972. During his term he contributed to the establishment of the Türkiye Diyanet Foundation in 1975. His term as the director of Religious Affairs ended on 26 July 1976.

Doğan served as an advisor to the Prime Minister of Turkey in 1976 and joined the CHP. He was elected as a deputy for the party from Malatya in the 1977 general election. He was appointed minister of state on 21 June 1977 to the cabinet formed by Bülent Ecevit after the elections. His ministerial portfolio included the affairs related to the Directorate of Religious Affairs. Doğan's tenure was very brief and ended on 27 July 1977.

Doğan published several books and contributed to various newspapers and journals.

== Personal life and death ==
Doğan died at a hospital in Ankara on 23 January 2018 at the age of 91 and was buried in the Cebeci cemetery.
