= 1975 Turkish Senate election =

Senate elections were held in Turkey on 12 October 1975. In this election 54 members of the Senate were elected; 50 members for one-third of the Senate and four vacant seats. The election system was the majority system and Justice Party gained more seats than Republican People's Party which was the leading party in terms of votes.

== Results ==
Party	Votes	%	Seats
Republican People's Party	2,281,470	43.37	25
Justice Party	2,147,026	40.81	27
National Salvation Party	465,731	8.85	2
Nationalist Movement Party	170,357	3.24	0
Democratic Party	165,170	3.14	0
Unity Party	28,283	0.54	0
Independents	2,851	0.05	0
Total	5,260,888	100.00	54
Valid votes	5,260,888	96.88	
Invalid/blank votes	169,296	3.12	
Total votes	5,430,184	100.00	
Registered voters/turnout	9,295,019	58.42	
Source: Nohlen et al.
