= Senate of the Republic (Turkey) =

Upper house of the Turkish Parliament (1961-1980)

Senate of the Republic Cumhuriyet Senatosu
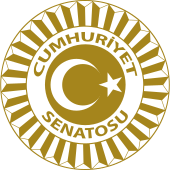
- Seal of the Senate of the Republic

Type
- Type: Upper house of the Turkish Parliament

History
- Founded: July 20, 1961
- Disbanded: September 12, 1980

Leadership
- 1st Chairman: Suat Hayri Ürgüplü; 1961-1963
- 2nd Chairman: Mehmet Enver Aka; 1963-1965
- 3rd Chairman: İbrahim Şevki Atasagun; 1965-1970
- 4th Chairman: Tekin Arıburun; 1970-1977
- 5th Chairman: Sırrı Atalay; 1977-1979
- 6th Chairman: İhsan Sabri Çağlayangil; 1979-1980

Senate of the Republic (Turkish: Cumhuriyet Senatosu) was the upper house of Turkish Parliament between 1961 and 1980. It was established with the Turkish constitution of 1961 and abolished with the 1982 constitution, although it did not exist after 12 September 1980 as a result of the 1980 coup d'état.

== History ==
Although the Turkish Parliament was established in 1920 to replace the older Ottoman Parliament, which had an upper Senate and lower Chamber of Deputies, the new parliament was composed of a single chamber. The Turkish constitution of 1961 introduced an upper house called the Senate of the Republic, or Senate for short. The name Grand National Assembly of Turkey (Turkish: Türkiye Büyük Millet Meclisi) referred to the entire parliament including both houses. However, the activities of both houses of the parliament were suspended after the 1980 Turkish coup d'état. Under the 1982 constitution, the Senate was abolished.

== Composition of the Senate ==
The Senate was composed of 150 elected members and 15 members appointed by the president. There were also senators known as "natural members", who were the former presidents (including the president of Hatay Republic) and the 22 members of the 1960 coup d'état committee members (Turkish: Milli Birlik Komitesi). In the first year, the Senate was composed of 188 members.

== Elections ==
In the Senate elections of 1961, the election system of the Senate differed from that of the lower house. While the D'Hondt method was used for the lower house (Turkish: Millet meclisi), majority system (winner takes all) was applied for the Senate. The outcome for the first senatorial election (with the exclusion of independents) was as follows:

Name of the party	Percentage of votes	No of seats gained	Percentage of seats
CHP	37.2 %	36	24 %
AP	35.4 %	71	47 %
YTP	13.9 %	27	18 %
CKMP	13.4 %	16	11 %

After 1961, the obvious discrepancy between the percentage of the votes and the number of seats was severely criticized and before the next elections, the election system for the Senate was changed to the D'Hondt system as well on 17 April 1964.

Another difference was in the electoral period. The total legislation term was six years, where 1/3 of the seats were up for election every two years (Turkish: Üçtebir yenileme seçimi). The first election (for all 150 members) was held on 15 October 1961. The seats up for election were decided by casting lots for the second and third elections.

The provinces were divided over three groups, the senators of the provinces in group A were renewed in 1968 and 1977, those in group B were renewed in 1966 and 1975 and those in group C were renewed in 1964, 1973 and 1979.

The last election was held on 14 October 1979.

== See also ==
- List of Chairmen of the Senate of Turkey
- Senate
- Senate of the Ottoman Empire
