= Constituent Assembly of Turkey =

Historical Turkish legislature

The Constituent Assembly of Turkey (Turkish: TBMM 1961 Kurucu Meclisi), also called the Chamber of Deputies or the House of Representatives (Temsilciler Meclisi), existed from 6 January 1961 to 24 October 1961. It was established by the military rule of 1960 Turkish coup d'état. About half of the members were appointed by the military rule and the rest were the elected members. Among the elected members there were Republican People's Party (CHP) and Republican Nation Party members as well as various NGO members. But the former Democrat Party (DP) members were not allowed in the parliament.

== Main parliamentary milestones ==
Some of the important events in the history of the parliament are the following:

=== Background:Between the 11th term and the constituent assembly ===
- 27 May 1960- Following the coup, Cemal Gürsel formed the 24th government of Turkey
- 12 June 1960 – The former parliament was legally abolished and a group of 36 coup members (MBK) temporarily undertook legislation.
- 29 September 1960- DP was closed by the military rule
- 15 November 1960 – 14 members of the MGK were expelled from MGK and sent to various embassies abroad.
- 22 November 1960 – Law 132 : Turkish standards institute (TSE) was established
- 5 January 1961- Cemal Gürsel formed the 25th government of Turkey

=== During the Constituent Assembly ===
- 6 January 1961 – The parliament was opened after a pause of seven months, Kazım Orbay was elected as the speaker
- 11 January 1961 – Justice Party (AP) and some other parties were founded
- 12 January 1961 – New Turkey Party (YTP) was founded
- 23 April 1961 – Parliament museum (later War of Independence Museum) was established on the 41st anniversary of the Turkish parliament
- 9 July 1961 –Referendum for the new constitution (accepted)
- 15 October 1961 -General elections

Preceded by 11th Parliament of Turkey	Constituent Assembly of Turkey; Kazım Orbay; 6 January 1961-24 October 1961	Succeeded by 12th Parliament of Turkey
