= Ministry of National Education (Turkey) =

Government ministry of Turkey

- Millî Eğitim Bakanlığı

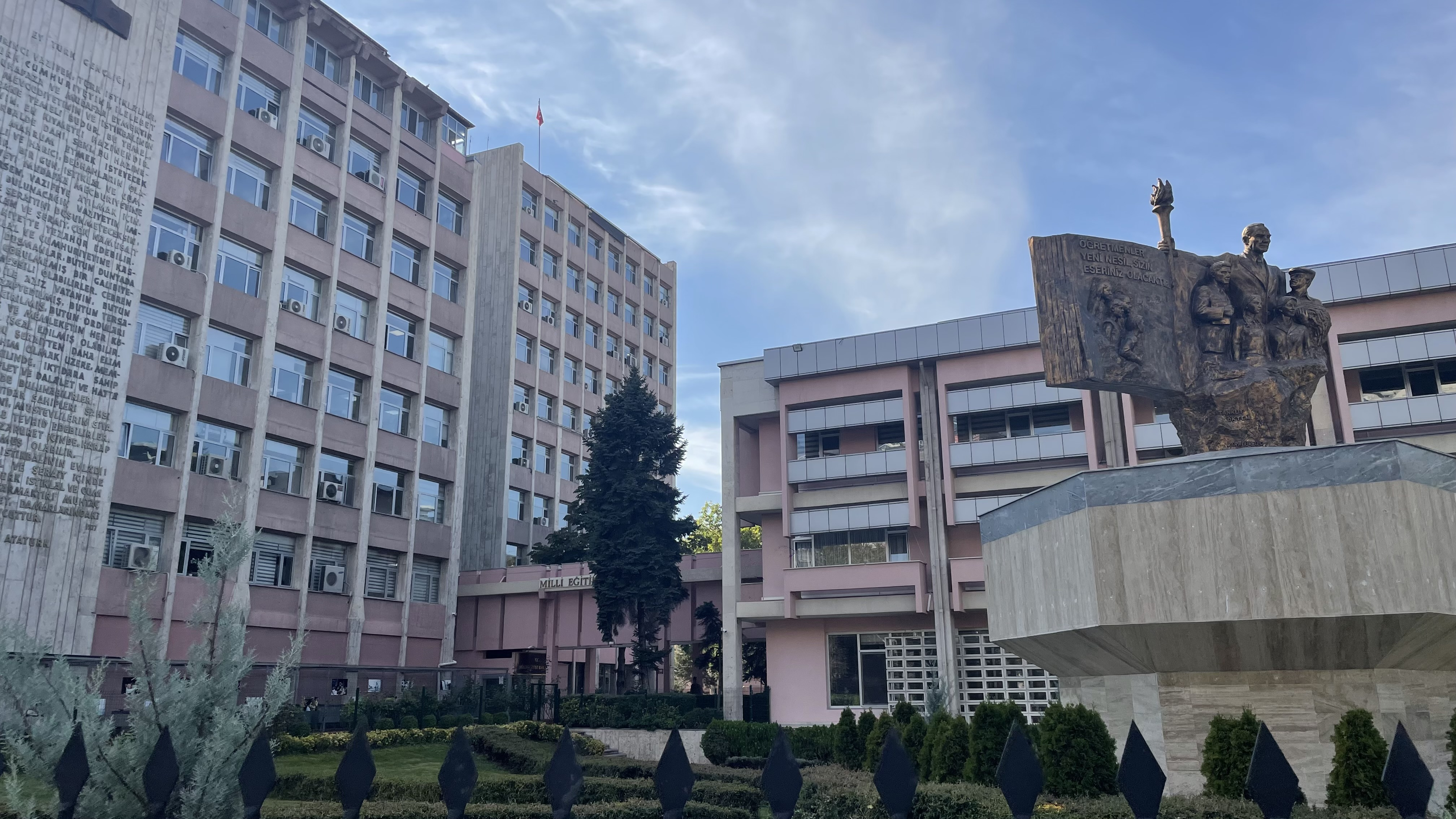

Agency overview
- Formed: 1920; 106 years ago
- Headquarters: Ankara
- Minister responsible: Yusuf Tekin
- Deputy Ministers responsible: Celile Eren Ökten; Kemal Şamlıoğlu; Nazif Yılmaz; Ömer Faruk Yelkenci
- Website: www.meb.gov.tr

The Ministry of National Education (Turkish: Millî Eğitim Bakanlığı) is a government ministry of the Republic of Turkey, responsible for the supervision of public and private educational system, agreements and authorizations under a national curriculum. The ministry is headed by Yusuf Tekin.

== History ==
After 1910, a Higher Education Office and a Libraries Inspection Office were established. During the War of National Liberation, there were two ministries of education. The Ministry of Education of the Turkish Grand National Assembly was in Angora (became known as Ankara after 1923, and in English as such after 1930), the Ministry of Education of the Ottoman Government in Constantinople (became known as Istanbul in English after 1930). After the Turkish Grand National Assembly was opened on 23 April 1920 a "Ministry of Education" was established by Law no. 3 of 2 May 1920 as one of the eleven ministries working under the Council of Ministers. In 1920 the Ministry of Education consisted of the following five units:

1. The Program Committee
2. Department of Primary Education
3. Department of Secondary Education
4. Office of Turkish Antiquities
5. Registry and Statistics Office

In 1923, the Ministry of Education in Istanbul was closed and the Ministry of Education in Ankara was expanded and reorganized to include eleven units. In the Republican period, organization of the Ministry of Education gradually developed and was reorganized with the Law no 2287 issued in 1933.

The Ministry of National Education; has been organized under the following names:

- "The Ministry of Education" from 1923 to December 27, 1935,
- "The Ministry of Culture" from December 28, 1935, to September 21, 1941,
- "The Ministry of Education" from September 22, 1941, to October 9, 1946,
- "The Ministry of National Education" after October 10, 1946,
- "The Ministry of Education" after 1950,
- "The Ministry of National Education" after May 27, 1960,
- "The Ministry of National Education, Youth and Sports" after 1983,
- "The Ministry of National Education" after 1989.

== Structure ==
According to Law no. 3797 on the organization and duties of the Ministry of National Education, the Ministry today consists of three divisions called: central, provincial and overseas organization. The Ministry of National Education has provincial organizations in 81 cities and 850 towns, 58 of them being the central towns of metropolitan cities. The Ministry of National Education has representation offices in 22 countries with 21 education undersecretaries and 17 education attaches.

The office of the Ministry consists of the Training Council, main service units, counselling and inspection units and auxiliary units. Chairmanship of the Occupational and Technical Training Research and Development Center and Chairmanship of the Project Coordination Board Center are also included in the central organization.

== See also ==
- Education in Turkey
- List of ministers of national education of Turkey
