= Adıyaman (electoral district) =

Electoral district for the Grand National Assembly of Turkey

Coordinates: 37°50′N 34°45′E

- electoral district for the Grand National Assembly of Turkey
- Adıyaman shown within Turkey
- Province: Adıyaman
- Electorate: 336,384 (2018)

Current electoral district
- Created: 1957
- Seats: 5 Historical: 6 (1999)
- Turnout at last election: 86.43 (2018)
- Representation
- AK Party: 4 / 5
- CHP: 1 / 5

Adıyaman is an electoral district of the Grand National Assembly of Turkey. It elects five members of parliament (deputies) to represent the province of the same name for a four-year term by the D'Hondt method, a party-list proportional representation system.

== Members ==
Population reviews of each electoral district are conducted before each general election, which can lead to certain districts being granted a smaller or greater number of parliamentary seats. Adıyaman's seats fell from six to five in the 2002 general election.

MPs for Adıyaman, 2002 onwards							
Election	2002 (22nd parliament)	2007 (23rd parliament)	2011 (24th parliament)	June 2015 (25th parliament)	November 2015 (26th parliament)	2018 (27th parliament)	2023 (28th parliament)
MP	Mahmut Göksu; AK Party	Ahmet Aydın; AK Party					Resul Kurt; AK Party
MP	Fehmi Hüsrev Kutlu; AK Party		Mehmet Metiner; AK Party	Adnan Boynukara; AK Party		Mehmet Metiner; AK Party	İshak Şan; AK Party
MP	Ahmet Faruk Ünsal; AK Party	Mehmet Erdoğan; AK Party		İbrahim Halil Fırat; AK Party			Mustafa Alkayış; AK Party
MP	Mehmet Özyol; AK Party	Şevket Gürsoy; AK Party	Muhammed Murtaza Yetiş; AK Party	Salih Fırat; AK Party		Yakup Taş; AK Party	Hüseyin Özhan; AK Party
MP	Şevket Gürsoy; CHP	Şevket Köse; CHP	Salih Fırat; CHP / AK Party	Behçet Yıldırım; HDP		Abdurrahman Tutdere; CHP	
MP	Hasari Güler; MHP	No seat					

== General elections ==
=== 1957 ===
Abbr.	Party	Votes	%	±%
DP	Democratic Party	37,868	49.8%	▲49.8%
CHP	Republican People's Party	28,684	37.7%	▲37.7%
HP	Liberty Party	9,236	12.1%	▲12.1%
CMP	Republican Nation Party	253	0.3%	▲0.3%
source: Haberler.com

=== 1961 ===
Abbr.	Party	Votes	%	±%
YTP	New Turkey Party	40,423	48.9%	▲48.9%
CHP	Republican People's Party	31,034	37.5%	▼0.2%
CKMP	Republican Villagers Nation Party	8,881	10.7%	▲10.7%
AP	Justice Party	2,372	2.9%	▲2.9%
source: Haberler.com

=== 1965 ===
Abbr.	Party	Votes	%	±%
AP	Justice Party	29,309	41.8%	▲38.9%
CHP	Republican People's Party	18,711	26.7%	▼10.8%
Independent	Süleyman Arif Emre	8,881	16.7%	▲16.7%
YTP	New Turkey Party	8,437	12%	▼36.9%
TİP	Workers' Party	1,943	2.8%	▲2.8%
source: Haberler.com

=== 1969 ===
Abbr.	Party	Votes	%	±%
CHP	Republican People's Party	26,668	31.2%	▲4.5%
AP	Justice Party	24,009	28.1%	▼13.7%
Independent	Ali Avni Turanlı	18,473	21.6%	▲21.6%
TİP	Workers' Party	7,331	8.6%	▲5.8%
YTP	New Turkey Party	4,386	5.1%	▼6.9%
CGP	Republican Reliance Party	1,761	2.1%	▲2.1%
TBP	Unity Party	1,502	1.8%	▲1.8%
MHP	Nationalist Movement Party	1,018	1.2%	▲1.2%
MP	Nation Party	342	0.4%	▲0.4%
source: Haberler.com

=== 1973 ===
Abbr.	Party	Votes	%	±%
CHP	Republican People's Party	28,856	32.7%	▲1.5%
AP	Justice Party	25,293	28.7%	▲0.6%
MSP	National Salvation Party	19,504	22.1%	▲22.1%
CGP	Republican Reliance Party	9,062	10.3%	▲8.2%
DP	Democratic Party	3,448	3.9%	▲3.9%
MHP	Nationalist Movement Party	1,444	1.6%	▲0.4%
TBP	Unity Party	1,502	0.7%	▲0.3%
source: Haberler.com

=== 1977 ===
Abbr.	Party	Votes	%	±%
CHP	Republican People's Party	49,243	41.9%	▲9.2%
AP	Justice Party	33,807	28.7%	Steady
MSP	National Salvation Party	22,625	19.2%	▼2.9%
MHP	Nationalist Movement Party	6,028	5.1%	▲3.5%
DP	Democratic Party	4,450	3.8%	▼0.1%
CGP	Republican Reliance Party	806	0.7%	▼9.6%
Independent		688	0.6%	▲0.6%
source: Haberler.com

=== 1983 ===
Abbr.	Party	Votes	%	±%
ANAP	Motherland Party	49,243	47.1%	▲47.1%
MDP	Nationalist Democracy Party	32,680	31.2%	▲31.2%
HP	Populist Party	32,575	31.1%	▲31.1%
source: Haberler.com

=== 1987 ===
Abbr.	Party	Votes	%	±%
ANAP	Motherland Party	51,771	32.9%	▼14.2%
SHP	Social Democratic Populist Party	38,317	24.3%	▲24.3%
DYP	True Path Party	36,362	23.1%	▲23.1%
RP	Welfare Party	17,965	11.4%	▲11.4%
DSP	Democratic Left Party	7,202	4.6%	▲4.6%
MÇP	Nationalist Workers Party	3,510	2.2%	▲2.2%
IDP	Reformist Democracy Party	1,904	1.2%	▲1.2%
Independent		392	0.2%	▲0.2%
source: Haberler.com

=== 1991 ===
Abbr.	Party	Votes	%	±%
SHP	Social Democratic Populist Party	46,632	27.2%	▲0.6%
DYP	True Path Party	42,776	24.9%	▲1.8%
RP	Welfare Party	42,770	24.9%	▲13.5%
ANAP	Motherland Party	34,876	20.3%	▼12.6%
DSP	Democratic Left Party	3,852	2.2%	▼2.4%
SOS	Workers' Party	632	0.4%	▲0.4%
source: Haberler.com

=== 1995 ===
Abbr.	Party	Votes	%	±%
RP	Welfare Party	64,205	32.6%	▲7.7%
DYP	True Path Party	36,641	18.6%	▼6.3%
ANAP	Motherland Party	29,104	14.8%	▼5.5%
CHP	Republican People's Party	21,454	10.9%	▲10.9%
HADEP	People's Democracy Party	18,672	9.5%	▲9.5%
MHP	Nationalist Movement Party	13,324	6.8%	▲6.8%
DSP	Democratic Left Party	5,687	2.9%	▲0.7%
Other		8,155	4.1%	▲4.1%
source: Haberler.com

=== 1999 ===
Abbr.	Party	Votes	%	±%
FP	Virtue Party	62,496	27.8%	▲27.8%
DYP	True Path Party	38,489	17.1%	▼1.5%
CHP	Republican People's Party	27,402	12.2%	▲1.3%
MHP	Nationalist Movement Party	24,072	10.7%	▲3.9%
ANAP	Motherland Party	23,786	10.6%	▼4.2%
HADEP	People's Democracy Party	17,055	7.6%	▼1.9%
DSP	Democratic Left Party	14,356	6.4%	▲3.5%
Other		17,455	7.8%	▲3.7%
source: Haberler.com

=== 2002 ===
Abbr.	Party	Votes	%	±%
AKP	Justice and Development Party	88,831	41.4%	▲41.4%
CHP	Republican People's Party	28,710	13.4%	▲1.2%
DEHAP	Democratic People's Party	25,666	12%	▲12.0%
DYP	True Path Party	20,935	9.8%	▼7.3%
SP	Felicity Party	11,766	5.5%	▲5.5%
ANAP	Motherland Party	11,494	5.4%	▼5.2%
MHP	Nationalist Movement Party	10,238	4.8%	▼5.9%
Other		16,833	7.8%	Steady
source: Haberler.com

=== 2007 ===
Abbr.	Party	Votes	%	±%
AKP	Justice and Development Party	159,735	65.3%	▲23.9%
CHP	Republican People's Party	34,108	13.9%	▲0.5%
DTP	Democratic Society Party	19,673	8%	▲8.0%
MHP	Nationalist Movement Party	12,807	5.2%	▼0.4%
Other		18,248	8.5%	▲0.7%
source: Haberler.com

=== 2011 ===
Abbr.	Party	Votes	%	±%
AKP	Justice and Development Party	205,209	67.3%	▲2.0%
CHP	Republican People's Party	50,615	16.6%	▲2.7%
	Labour, Democracy and Freedom Bloc	19,917	6.5%	▲6.5%
MHP	Nationalist Movement Party	14,075	4.6%	▼0.6%
Other		15,281	5%	▼3.5%
source: YSK

=== June 2015 ===
Abbr.	Party	Votes	%	±%
AKP	Justice and Development Party	178,387	58.2%	▼9.1%
HDP	Peoples' Democratic Party	69,543	22.7%	▲22.7%
CHP	Republican People's Party	34,814	11.4%	▼5.2%
MHP	Nationalist Movement Party	12,946	4.2%	▼0.4%
SP	Felicity Party	6,008	2%	▲1.3%
	Other	4,864	1.6%	▼3.4%
Total		306,562		
Turnout		82.32		
source: YSK

=== November 2015 ===
Abbr.	Party	Votes	%	±%
AKP	Justice and Development Party	222,189	69.5%	▲11.3%
HDP	Peoples' Democratic Party	45,431	14.2%	▼8.5%
CHP	Republican People's Party	35,985	11.2%	▼0.2%
MHP	Nationalist Movement Party	9,477	3%	▼1.2%
SP	Felicity Party	2,063	0.6%	▼1.4%
	Other	4,750	1.5%	▼0.1%
Total		319,895		
Turnout		85.21		
source: YSK

=== 2018 ===
Abbr.	Party	Votes	%	±%
AKP	Justice and Development Party	183,722	54.6%	▼14.9%
HDP	Peoples' Democratic Party	51,641	15.4%	▲1.2%
CHP	Republican People's Party	39,720	11.8%	▲0.6%
MHP	Nationalist Movement Party	30,521	9.1%	▲6.1%
IYI	Good Party	17,753	5.3%	▲5.3%
SP	Felicity Party	5,514	1.6%	▲1.0%
	Other	7,463	2.2%	▲0.7%
Total		336,384		
Turnout		86.43		
source: YSK

=== 2023 ===
Member	Political party
Resul Kurt	Justice and Development Party
İshak Şan	Justice and Development Party
Mustafa Alkayış	Justice and Development Party
Hüseyin Özhan	Justice and Development Party
Abdurrahman Tutdere	Republican People's Party

== Presidential elections ==
=== 2014 ===
2014 presidential election: Adıyaman
Party	Candidate	Votes	%
AK Party	Recep Tayyip Erdoğan	198,325	69.30
Independent	Ekmeleddin İhsanoğlu	44,137	15.42
HDP	Selahattin Demirtaş	43,713	15.27
Total votes		286,175	100.00
Rejected ballots		4,401	1.51
Turnout		290,576	77.49
Recep Tayyip Erdoğan win			

=== 2018 ===
Abbr.	Party	Votes	%	±%
AKP	Recep Tayyip Erdoğan	226,926	67.41%	▼1.89%
CHP	Muharrem Ince	68,852	20.45%	▲5.03
Peoples' Democratic Party	Selahattin Demirtaş	24,949	7.41%	▼7.86
Good Party	Meral Akşener	11,492	3.41%	▲3.41
SP	Temel Karamollaoğlu	3,906	1.16%	▲1.16
	Other	529	0.2%	-
Total		336,654		
Turnout		86.49		
source: YSK
