= Turkish local elections after 1980 =

The outcome (in %) of the Turkish local elections after 1980 is shown below. (In 1981 all parties were closed by the military rule. For local elections before 1980 see Turkish local elections before 1980.). In the local elections in addition to mayors and muhtars, members of local parliaments (Turkish: il genel meclisi) are elected. The voter base of the local parliaments and the national parliament is assumed to be identical. In the table, only those parties which received more than 1% are shown.

Date of Election	ANAP	SODEP	DYP	HP	MDP	RP-FP	SHP	DSP	MHP	CHP	BBP	HADEP-DTP	AKP	SP	GP
25.03.1984	41,52	23,35	13,25	8,76	7,09	4,40	…	…	…	…	…	…	…	…	…
26.03.1989	21,80	…	25,13	…	…	9,80	28,69	9,03	4,14	…	…	…	…	…	
27.03.1994	21,09	...	21,41	…	…	19,14	13,53	8,75	7,95	4,61	1,26	…	…	…	…
18.04.1999	15,03	…	13,21	…	…	16,48	…	18,70	17,17	11,08	1,72	3,48	…	…	…
28.03.2004	2,5	...	9,97	…	…	...	…	2,12	10,45	18,23	1,16	5,15	41,67	4,02	2,60
29.03.2009	…	…	3,84	…	…	...	…	2,85	15,97	23,08	2,36	5,70	38,39	5,2	...

== Legend of abbreviations ==
- ANAP: Motherland Party (later on merged into True Path Party)
- SODEP:Social Democracy Party (later on merged with People’s Party)
- DYP:True Path Party (later on renamed Democratic Party)
- HP:People’s Party (later on merged with SODEP)
- MDP:Nationalist Democracy Party
- RP:Welfare Party

FP:Virtue Party

- SHP:Social Democrat People’s Party (result of SODEP-HP, later itself merged with CHP)
- CHP:Issued from SHP (later on merged with SHP)
- DSP:Democratic Left Party
- MHP:Nationalist Movement Party (actually in 1989 National Task Party)
- BBP:Great Union Party
- HADEP:People’s Democracy Party(In 2004 as a coalition with SHP (not to be confused with SHP above))

DTP:Democratic Society Party

- AKP:Justice and Development Party
- SP:Felicity Party
- GP:Young Party

== See also ==
- Turkish general elections after 1980
