= Turkish general elections after 1980 =

The outcome of the Turkish general elections after 1983 is shown below. (After the coup d'etat in 1980 all political parties were closed by the military government. See also Turkish general elections before 1980.) In the table below only major parties are shown. So the summation of percentages may be lower than 100%. The winner is shown in color. The legend of abbreviations is shown at the end of the table.

Date of Election	ANAP	MDP	HP	DYP-DP	RP-FP-SAADET	SHP	DSP	CHP	MÇP-MHP	AKP	HADEP-DEHAP-HDP-YSP	İYİ	Indep.
06.11.1983	45,1	23,3	30,5										1,1
29.11.1987	36,3			19,7	7,1	24,7	8,5		2,9				0,3
20.10.1991	24			27	16,9	20,8	10,8						0,1
24.12.1995	19,7			19,2	21,4		14,6	10,7	8,1		4,1		0,4
18.04.1999	13,2			12	15,4		22,2	8,7	18		4,7		0,9
03.11.2002	5,13			9,4	2,5		1,2	19,4	8,3	34,4	6,2		1
22.07.2007				5,4	2,3			20,9	14,3	46,6			5,3
12.06.2011				0,6	1,3		0,2	25,9	13	49,9			6,6
07.06.2015				0,2	2		0,2	24,9	16,3	40,9	13,1		1
01.11.2015				0,1	0,7		0,1	25,3	11,9	49,5	10,7		0,1
24.06.2018					1,3			22,7	11,1	42,6	11,7	9,9	0,1
14.05.2023	0,1							25,3	10	35,6	8,8	9,7	0,4

== Legent of the abbreviations ==
- ANAP: Motherland Party
- MDP: Nationalist Democracy Party
- HP: Populist Party
- DYP: True Path Party

Later DP: Democrat Party

- RP: Welfare Party (banned in 1998)

Later FP: Virtue Party (dissolved into AKP and SAADET in 2001)
SAADET: Felicity Party

- SHP: Social Democratic Populist Party (after merging of SODEP and HP)
- DSP: Democratic Left Party
- CHP: Republican People’s Party (issued from SHP, later merged with SHP)
- MÇP: National Task Party

Later MHP: National Movement Party

- AKP: Justice and Development Party
- HADEP: People's Democracy Party (banned in 2003)

Later DEHAP: Democratic People's Party (merged into DTH in 2005)
Later HDP: Peoples' Democratic Party (de facto merged into YSP)
Later YSP: Greens and Left Future Party

- İYİ: Good Party
