= Early life and career of Recep Tayyip Erdoğan =

Recep Tayyip Erdoğan, the 25th prime minister and 12th president of Turkey, was born on 26 February 1954, in Istanbul, Turkey.

== Childhood years and youth ==
Recep Tayyip Erdoğan was born in Kasımpaşa, a poor neighborhood of Istanbul. His family was originally from Rize, a conservative town on the eastern coast of the Black Sea, and returned there when Erdoğan was still an infant, coming back to Istanbul again when he was 13. He spent those years attending Istanbul İmam Hatip school, and selling watermelons, lemonade, and simit (sesame rings) on the city's streets to make extra bills.

While studying business administration at what is today Marmara University's Faculty of Economics and Administrative Sciences and playing semi-professional football, Erdoğan also engaged in politics by joining the National Turkish Student Union, an anti-communist action group. In 1976, he became the head of a local youth branch of the Islamist National Salvation Party (MSP), led by Necmettin Erbakan, who would later go on to found the Felicity Party. This was the beginning of Erdoğan's long career in politics.

== Mayor of Istanbul ==
After the 1980 coup, Erbakan's movement regrouped under the Welfare Party (RP), and Erdoğan gradually became one of its stars. In 1991, Erdoğan became a candidate for Parliament on the party's ticket and won a seat, only to be kept from taking it on a technicality.

In 1994, Erdoğan was elected Mayor of Istanbul to the shock of the city's more secular citizens, who thought he would ban alcohol and impose Islamic law. Instead, he emerged over the next four years as a pragmatic mayor who tackled many chronic problems in the city, including pollution, water shortages and traffic.

Meanwhile, the political environment was growing tense in Turkey, as the Welfare Party came to power in June 1996 in a coalition government with the center-right True Path Party (DYP). RP head Necmettin Erbakan, who was an openly Islamist prime minister of Turkey, conflicted with the principle of the separation of religion and state in Turkey with his radical rhetoric. Six months later, in February 1997, the military initiated what was later dubbed the "post-modern coup". Soon, Erbakan was ousted from power and many Islamist groups were the subject of a crackdown as part of a series of court cases opened by prosecutors.

Erdoğan was caught up in this crackdown in 1997, when he made a public speech in the southeastern province of Siirt denouncing the closure of his party and recited these lines of a poem from the Turkish War of Liberation: "The mosques are our barracks, the domes our helmets, the minarets our bayonets and the faithful our soldiers."

A court held that this speech was an attack on the government and Islamist rhetoric, and sentenced Erdoğan in September 1998 to a 10-month prison term, of which he served four months. He was also banned from holding political office for life. "Erdoğan's political career is over," some mainstream newspapers wrote at the time. "From now on, he can't even be a local governor."

== Between 1999 and 2001 ==
In the aftermath of the post-modern coup, Erdoğan came to believe that a new political line, different from Erbakan's anti-Western demagoguery, was needed. This was something he hinted at in the Siirt speech that netted him a prison term. As part of that speech, Erdoğan also said: "The Western man has freedom of belief; in Europe, there is respect for worship, for the headscarf. Why is there not in Turkey?"

This Western-oriented line would be the new vision of Erdoğan and the more open-minded members of the Erbakan movement, such as Abdullah Gül. In their vision, authoritarian secularism in Turkey should not be considered an extension of the West, as religious conservatives had done for decades. The West should rather be seen as a way to create a more liberal Turkey that would respect religious liberty as well. Erdoğan had personal reasons to make that choice: He could thus send his veiled daughters, Esra and Sümeyye, not to Turkish universities, where there is a headscarf ban, but to American ones, where the coverings can be worn.

Erdoğan and his colleagues thus put European Union membership, and EU-promoted political reforms, at the top of their agenda – at the expense of being accused of "treason" by their old comrades who stayed loyal to Erbakan.

== The birth of the AKP ==
In 2001, Erdoğan and Gül established the Justice and Development Party (AKP). The party chose as its emblem a modern light bulb, and Erdoğan asserted that the AKP was "not a political party with a religious axis", but rather one that could be defined as a mainstream conservative party. Its message concentrated on political liberalization and economic growth gave the party a sweeping victory in the general elections of November 2002.

Even though his party won the elections, Erdoğan could not become prime minister right away, as he was still banned from politics by the judiciary for his speech in Siirt, and Gül thus became the prime minister instead. In December 2002 the Supreme Election Board canceled the general election results from Siirt due to voting irregularities and scheduled a new election for February 9, 2003. By this time, party leader Erdoğan was able to run for Parliament thanks to a legal change made possible by the opposition Republican People's Party (CHP) and its leader, Deniz Baykal. The AKP listed Erdoğan as a candidate for the rescheduled Siirt election, and he won, becoming prime minister after Gül subsequently handed over the post.
