= Abdurrahman Tutdere =

Turkish politician (born 1976)

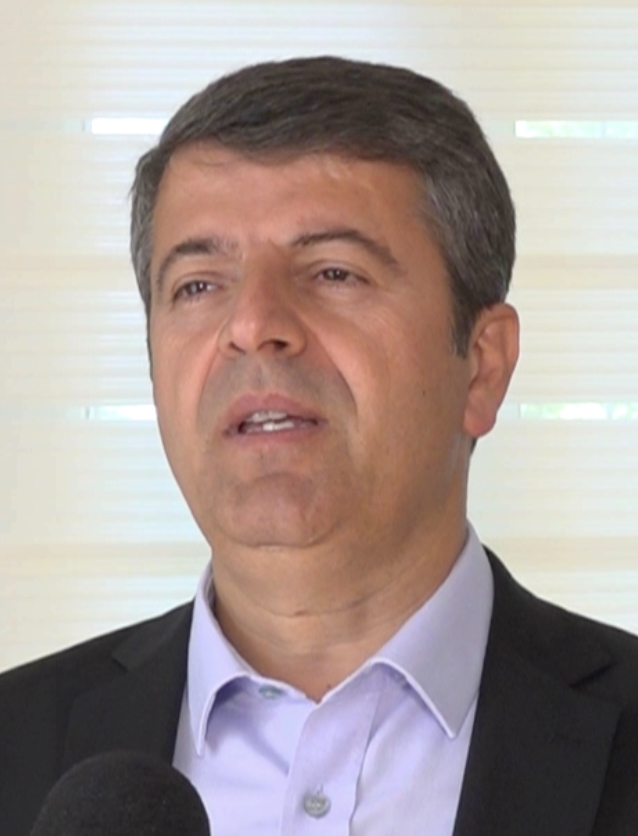

Mayor of Adıyaman
- Incumbent
- Assumed office 5 August 2025
- Preceded by: Ufuk Bayır (acting)
- In office 3 April 2024 – 10 July 2025
- Preceded by: Süleyman Kılınç
- Succeeded by: Ufuk Bayır (acting)

Member of the Turkish Grand National Assembly
- In office 7 July 2018 – 3 April 2024
- Constituency: Adıyaman (2018, 2023)

Personal details
- Born: 19 January 1976 (age 50) Adıyaman, Turkey
- Party: Republican People's Party (1998–present)
- Children: 2
- Education: Atatürk University Erzincan Faculty of Law
- Occupation: Politician, lawyer

Abdurrahman Tutdere (born 19 January 1976, Adıyaman) is a Turkish lawyer and politician of Kurdish origin. He served as a Republican People's Party (CHP) 27th and 28th term Member of Parliament for Adıyaman. He was elected Mayor of Adıyaman in the 2024 local elections.

== Early life and career ==
He was born in 1976 in the village of Bağlıca, central Adıyaman. He graduated from the Atatürk University Erzincan Faculty of Law. From 2001 onwards, he worked as a freelance lawyer and a certified mediator. He held positions on the Adıyaman Bar Association board and on the Child Rights Committee of the Union of Turkish Bar Associations.

== Political career ==
He joined the CHP Adıyaman Provincial Youth Branch in 1998. Within the party's Adıyaman organization, he served as Chairman of the Provincial Disciplinary Board, member of the Provincial Executive Board, and Provincial Secretary, and was a delegate to provincial and district congresses multiple times.

He was elected as a CHP MP for Adıyaman in the 2018 elections and served as a Clerk member in the parliament. He was re-elected as a CHP MP for Adıyaman in the 2023 general election and served on the Human Rights Inquiry Committee in the parliament.

He was nominated as the CHP's candidate for Mayor of Adıyaman in the 2024 local elections and, according to unofficial results, won the mayoralty with 49.74% of the vote. Thus, Tutdere became the first social democratic politician to win the Adıyaman mayorship since 1989. Tutdere received his certificate of election on 3 April 2024 and assumed office.

== Legal proceedings ==
Tutdere, who was under investigation for the crime of "extortion by coercion", was temporarily removed from duty by the Ministry of Interior as a precautionary measure. This action was in accordance with Article 127 of the Constitution and Article 47 of the Municipality Law No. 5393, following a decision by the Istanbul 8th Penal Court of Peace on 8 July 2025 (file no. 2025/855) to place him under judicial control with a travel ban.

He was reinstated to his position on 5 August 2025.
