= Turkish general elections before 1980 =

The outcomes of the Turkish general elections before 1980 (more specifically between 1946 and 1977) is as follows. After coup d'état in 1980 all political parties were closed by the military rule. For the elections after 1980 see Turkish general elections after 1980. In the table below only the percentage of the votes received by the parties which were qualified to send representatives to the parliament are shown. Thus, the summation of percentages may be lower than 100%. The winner is shown in color. The legend of the abbreviations is shown at the end of the table.

Date of election	CHP	DP	MP-CMP	HP	AP	CKMP-MHP	YTP	MP	TİP	GP-CGP	BP-TBP	DP	MSP	Indep.
21.07.1946	85	13												2
14.05.1950	39,5	52,7	3,1											4,8
02.05.1954	35,3	57,5	4,8											1,8
27.10.1957	41,1	48	7,1	3,8										
15.10.1961	36,7				34,8	13,9	13,7							
10.10.1965	28,8				52,9	2,2	3,7	6,3	3					3,2
12.10.1969	27,4				46,6	3	2,2	3,2	2,7	6,6	2,8			5,6
14.10.1973	33,3				29,8	3,4				5,3	1,1	11,9	11,8	2,8
05.06.1977	41,4				36,9	6,4				1,9		1,9	8,6	2,5

== Legent of the abbreviations ==
- CHP:Republican People's Party
- DP:Democrat Party
- MP:Nation Party

Later CMP:Republican Nation Party

- HP:Liberty Party
- AP:Justice Party
- CKMP: Republican Peasants' Nation Party (former CMP after merging with another party)

Later MHP: National Movement Party

- YTP:New Turkey Party
- MP:Nation Party (issued from CKMP)
- TİP:Turkish Workers' Party
- GP: Confidence Party (issued from CHP)

Later CGP:Republican Confidence Party

- BP: Unity Party

Later TBP: Unity Party of Turkey

- DP:Democratic Party (issued from AP)
- MSP: National Salvation Party

== See also ==
- Turkish local elections before 1980
