= Germanopolis =

Germanopolis may refer to:

- Germantown, Philadelphia, USA
- Germanicopolis (Paphlagonia), Asia Minor
