= Turkish local elections before 1980 =

The outcome (in %) of the Turkish local elections before 1980 (1963-1977) is shown below. (In 1981 all parties were closed by the military rule. For the local elections after 1980, see Turkish local elections after 1980.) In the local elections in addition to mayors and muhtars, members of local parliaments (Turkish: il genel meclisi) are elected. The voter base of the local parliaments and the national parliament is assumed to be identical. In the table, only those parties which received more than 1% are shown.

Date of Election	AP	CHP	YTP	MP	CKMP-MHP	GP-CGP	TİP	BP-TBP	DP	MSP
17 November 1963	45.5	36.2	6.5	3.1	3.1	...	...	...	...	...
2 June 1968	49.1	27.9	...	3.1	1	6.6	2.7	1.6	...	...
9 December 1973	32.3	37.1	...	...	1.3	2.9	...	...	10.8	6.2
11 December 1977	37.1	41.7	...	...	6.6	...	...	...	1	6.9

== Legent of the abbreviations ==
- AP:Justice Party
- CHP:Republican People's Party
- YTP:New Turkey Party
- CKMP: Republican Peasants' Nation Party

Later MHP: National Movement Party

- MP:Nation Party (issued from CKMP)
- GP: Confidence Party (issued from CHP)

Later CGP:Republican Confidence Party

- TİP:Turkish Workers' Party
- BP: Unity Party

Later TBP:Turkey Unity Party

- DP:Democratic Party (issued from AP)
- MSP: National Salvation Party
