= Çankırı =

- Municipality
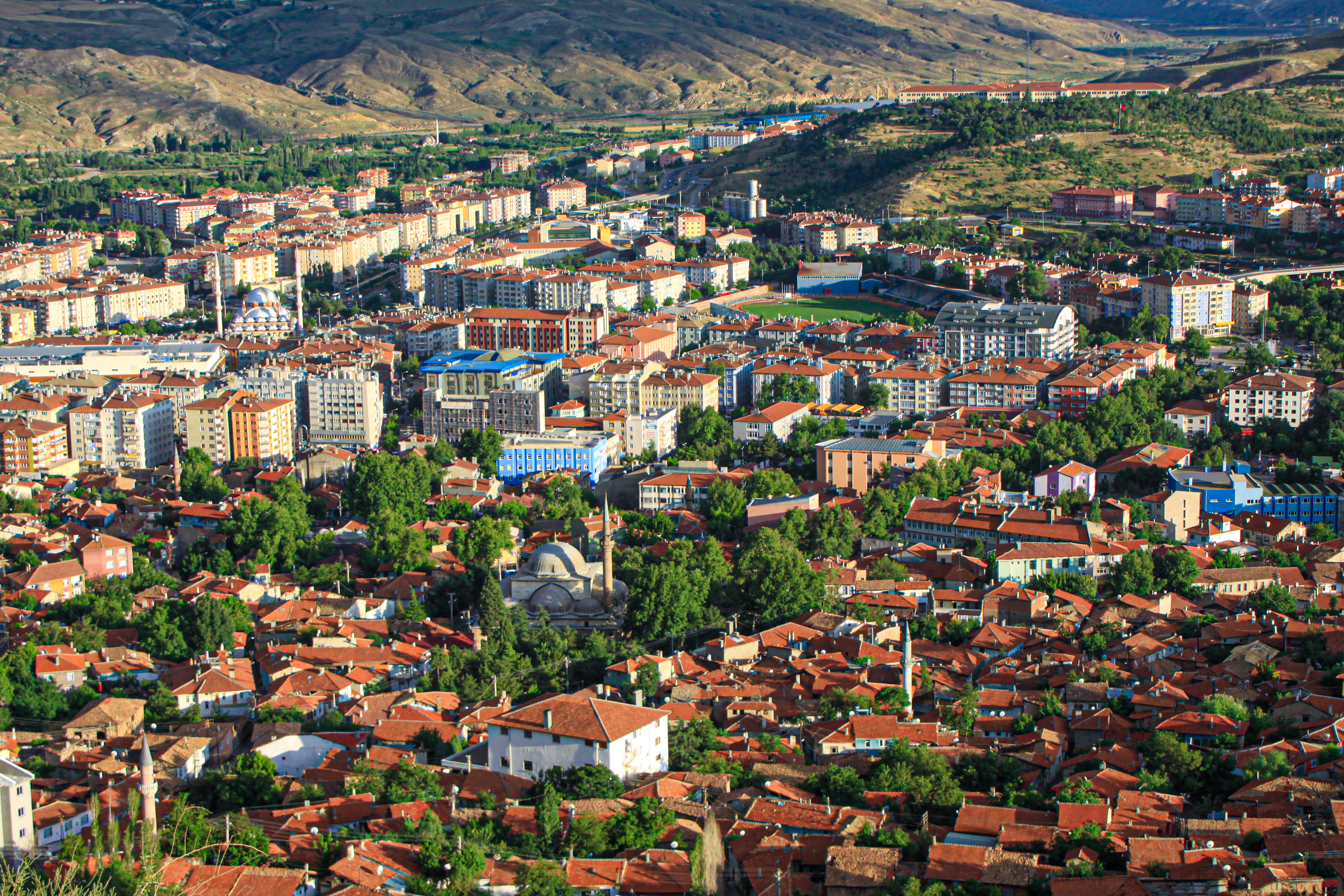
- General view of Çankırı

- Location within Turkey Location within Turkey Central Anatolia
- Coordinates: 40°35′55″N 33°37′09″E
- Country: Turkey
- Province: Çankırı
- District: Çankırı

Government
  - Mayor: İsmail Hakkı Esen (MHP)
- Elevation: 800 m (2,600 ft)
- Population (2021): 90,564
- Time zone: UTC+3 (TRT)
- Area code: 0376
- Website: cankiri.bel.tr

Çankırı is a city in Turkey, about 140 km (87 mi) northeast of Ankara. It is situated about 800 m (2500 ft) above sea level. It is the seat of Çankırı Province and of Çankırı District. Its population is 90,564 (2021).

== History ==
Çankırı Museum building

Çankırı was known in antiquity as Gangra (Greek: Γάγγρα), and later Germanicopolis (Greek: Γερμανικόπολις). The city has also been known as Changra, Kandari, Kanghari, or Kangri. Α town of Paphlagonia that appears to have been once the capital of Paphlagonia and a princely residence, for it is known from Strabo that Deiotarus Philadelphus (before 31 BC–5/6 AD), the last king of Paphlagonia, resided there. Notwithstanding this, Strabo describes it as only "a small town and a garrison".

According to 1st-century BC writer Alexander the Polyhistor the town was built by a goat herder who had found one of his goats straying there; but this origin is probably a mere philological speculation as gangra signifies "a goat" in the Paphlagonian language. Gangra was absorbed into the Roman province of Galatia upon the death of Deiotarus in 6/5 BC. The earlier town was built on the hill behind the modern city, on which are the ruins of a late fortress, while the Roman city occupied the site of the modern city. In the writings of the 2nd-century AD Greco-Roman writer Ptolemy, the city is referred to as Germanicopolis (Greek: Γερμανικόπολις). It was named Germanicopolis, after Germanicus or possibly the emperor Claudius, until the time of Caracalla. In Christian times, Gangra was the metropolitan see of Paphlagonia. Hypatios, bishop of Gangra, is considered a saint in the Orthodox Christian tradition. He was killed by Arians on his return from the Council of Nicaea (325 AD), in which he took part.

In the 4th century, the town was the scene of an important ecclesiastical synod, the Synod of Gangra. There is disagreement about the date of the synod, with dates varying from AD 341 to 376. The synodal letter states that twenty-one bishops assembled to take action concerning Eustathius of Sebaste and his followers. The synod issued twenty canons known as the Canons of Gangra; these were declared ecumenical by the Council of Chalcedon in 451. Under these canons, the sect disowned marriage, disparaged the offices of the church, held conventicles of their own, wore a peculiar dress, denounced riches, and affected special sanctity. The synod condemned the Eustathian practices, declaring however that it was not virginity that was condemned, but the dishonouring of marriage; not poverty, but the disparagement of honest and benevolent wealth; not asceticism, but spiritual pride; not individual piety, but dishonouring the house of God.

In 1400-1401, after a synod the Patriarch Matthew I appointed George Kontophe as metropolitan of Gangra, following a request from its inhabitants, who were being threatened by the Turkomans.

Over the centuries the settlement witnessed the hegemony of many cultures and races, such as Hittites, Persians, ancient Greeks, Parthians, Pontic Greeks, Galatians, Romans, Byzantine Greeks, up to the Seljuks and finally the Ottoman Turks. Traces from its long past are still visible throughout the city. The continuity of the city's name from ancient times across languages is of note: Hangara for the Arabs, Gagra for the Jews and Tzungra or Kângıri or Çankıri for the Turks.

== Climate ==
Çankırı has a dry summer continental climate (Köppen climate classification: Dsa and Dsb) or a humid continental climate (Trewartha climate classification: Dca and Dcb). Other locations to the north of the city center feature more humid characteristics (Köppen climate classification: Dfa and Dfb). Summers are usually hot and dry and winters are cold and snowy. The rainiest month is May, while the driest month is July.

Climate data for Çankırı (1991–2020, extremes 1929–2023)
Month	Jan	Feb	Mar	Apr	May	Jun	Jul	Aug	Sep	Oct	Nov	Dec	Year
Record high °C (°F)	17.6 (63.7)	22.0 (71.6)	29.0 (84.2)	31.0 (87.8)	35.5 (95.9)	39.6 (103.3)	42.4 (108.3)	41.8 (107.2)	39.8 (103.6)	34.2 (93.6)	25.1 (77.2)	18.2 (64.8)	42.4 (108.3)
Mean daily maximum °C (°F)	3.9 (39.0)	7.0 (44.6)	12.8 (55.0)	18.3 (64.9)	23.5 (74.3)	28.0 (82.4)	32.0 (89.6)	32.2 (90.0)	27.5 (81.5)	20.9 (69.6)	12.4 (54.3)	5.7 (42.3)	18.7 (65.7)
Daily mean °C (°F)	−0.4 (31.3)	1.5 (34.7)	6.0 (42.8)	11.0 (51.8)	15.9 (60.6)	20.1 (68.2)	23.4 (74.1)	23.3 (73.9)	18.5 (65.3)	12.7 (54.9)	5.5 (41.9)	1.4 (34.5)	11.6 (52.9)
Mean daily minimum °C (°F)	−3.8 (25.2)	−2.9 (26.8)	0.1 (32.2)	4.2 (39.6)	8.7 (47.7)	12.3 (54.1)	14.7 (58.5)	14.6 (58.3)	10.1 (50.2)	5.8 (42.4)	0.2 (32.4)	−2.0 (28.4)	5.2 (41.4)
Record low °C (°F)	−25.0 (−13.0)	−24.0 (−11.2)	−20.5 (−4.9)	−8.9 (16.0)	−3.0 (26.6)	1.6 (34.9)	4.3 (39.7)	4.6 (40.3)	−2.0 (28.4)	−6.3 (20.7)	−19.4 (−2.9)	−18.8 (−1.8)	−25.0 (−13.0)
Average precipitation mm (inches)	41.6 (1.64)	31.7 (1.25)	38.1 (1.50)	45.2 (1.78)	57.8 (2.28)	45.5 (1.79)	20.4 (0.80)	22.9 (0.90)	20.0 (0.79)	32.5 (1.28)	26.3 (1.04)	45.9 (1.81)	427.9 (16.85)
Average precipitation days	10.40	9.27	9.90	11.43	13.40	11.10	4.83	5.00	5.17	7.67	7.13	10.23	105.5
Average snowy days	7.2	4.1	2.4	0.3	0	0	0	0	0	0	0.5	3.4	17.9
Average relative humidity (%)	79.6	73.7	65.1	62.2	62.9	59.0	52.4	52.6	56.9	66.2	74.6	80.1	65.4
Mean monthly sunshine hours	64.4	103.1	163.0	196.1	241.9	281.4	327.7	306.6	251.0	189.8	123.1	59.4	2,307.4
Mean daily sunshine hours	2.2	3.8	5.3	6.6	7.8	9.4	10.6	9.9	8.4	6.1	4.1	2.0	6.3
Source 1: Turkish State Meteorological Service,
Source 2: NOAA (humidity, sun 1991-2020), Meteomanz (snowy days 2008-2024)

== Economy ==
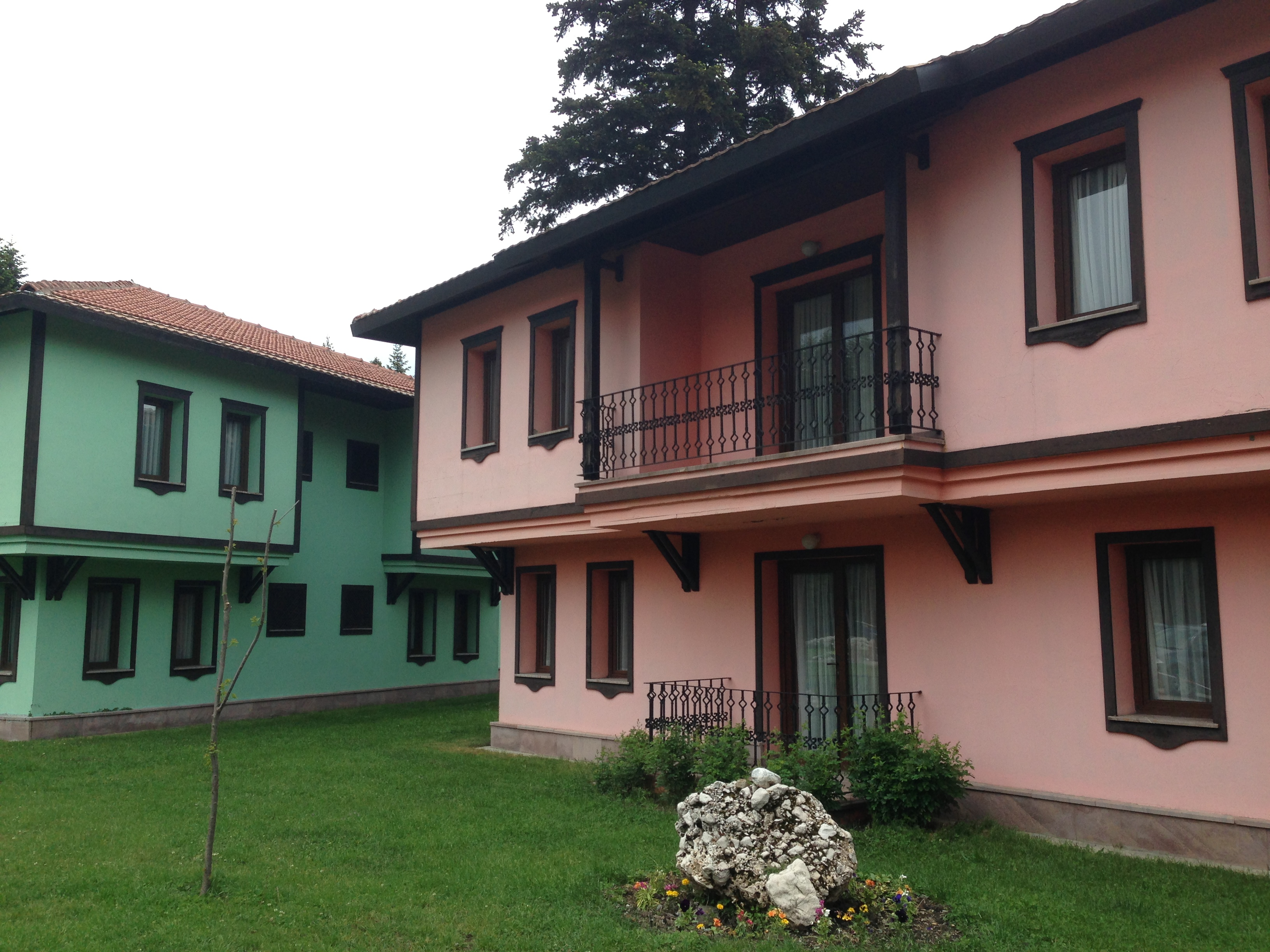
Houses in Ilgaz Mountain National Park

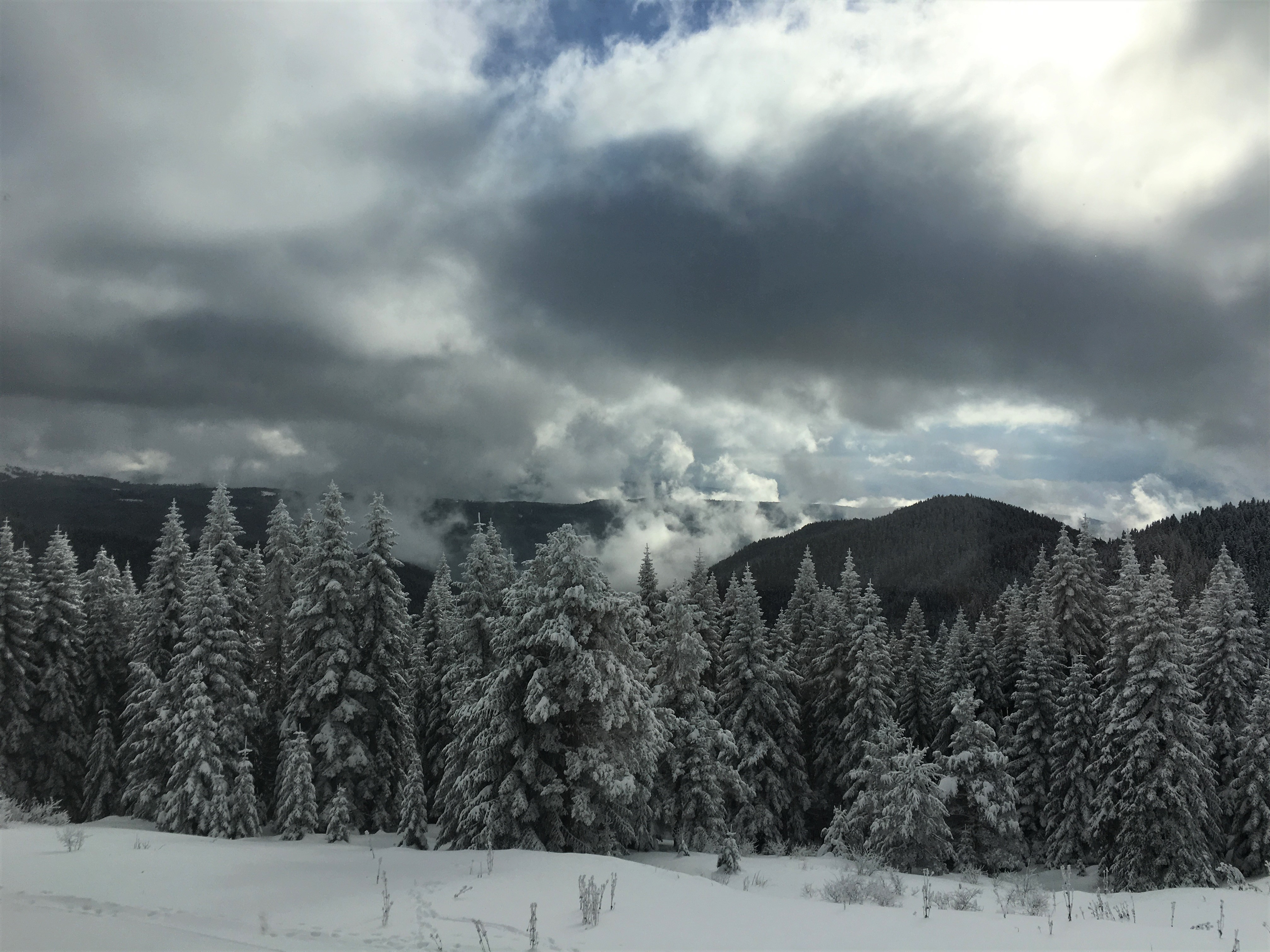
Ilgaz Mountain is a famous tourism destination especially for the winter tourism

=== Agriculture ===
Various agricultural produce, including wheat, corn, beans, and apples is grown in the farms and fields.

=== Industry ===
Most industry is concentrated near the Çankırı city center and the town of Korgun. Other towns included in the larger industrial area of the city are Şabanözü, Çerkeş, Ilgaz, Kurşunlu, and Yapraklı.

== Education ==
Çankırı is home to Çankırı Karatekin University, which was founded in 2007.

== Notable people ==
- Ankaralı Namık (1976–2015), the bestselling of folk music artist and Ankara folk culture
- Ahmet Çakar (born 1962), the medical doctor, FIFA cockade old football referee and sport TV programme pundit

== Mayors Of Çankırı Province ==
- 1977-1980 Necdet İpek MHP
- 1984-1989 Mustafa Kale ANAP
- 1989-1994 Raif Oktay DYP
- 1994-2002 Ahmet Bukan MHP
- 2002-2004 Namık Kemal Eryılmaz MHP
- 2004-2018 İrfan Dinç AK Party
- 2018-2019 Hüseyin Boz AK Party
- 2019-present İsmail Hakkı Esen MHP

== See also ==
- Anatolian Tigers
