= İshak Şan =

Turkish physician and politician

İshak Şan MP

Member of the Grand National Assembly of Turkey
- Incumbent
- Assumed office 2 June 2023
- Constituency: Adıyaman

Personal details
- Born: 5 June 1976 (age 50) Adıyaman, Turkey
- Party: Justice and Development Party (AKP)
- Education: Fırat University

İshak Şan is a Turkish physician and politician who has been serving as a Member of the Turkish Parliament representing the Justice and Development Party since 2023.
