= 1995 Turkish general election =

← 1991	24 December 1995	1999 →

All 550 seats in the Grand National Assembly 276 seats needed for a majority
- Turnout: 85.20% (▲1.28pp)
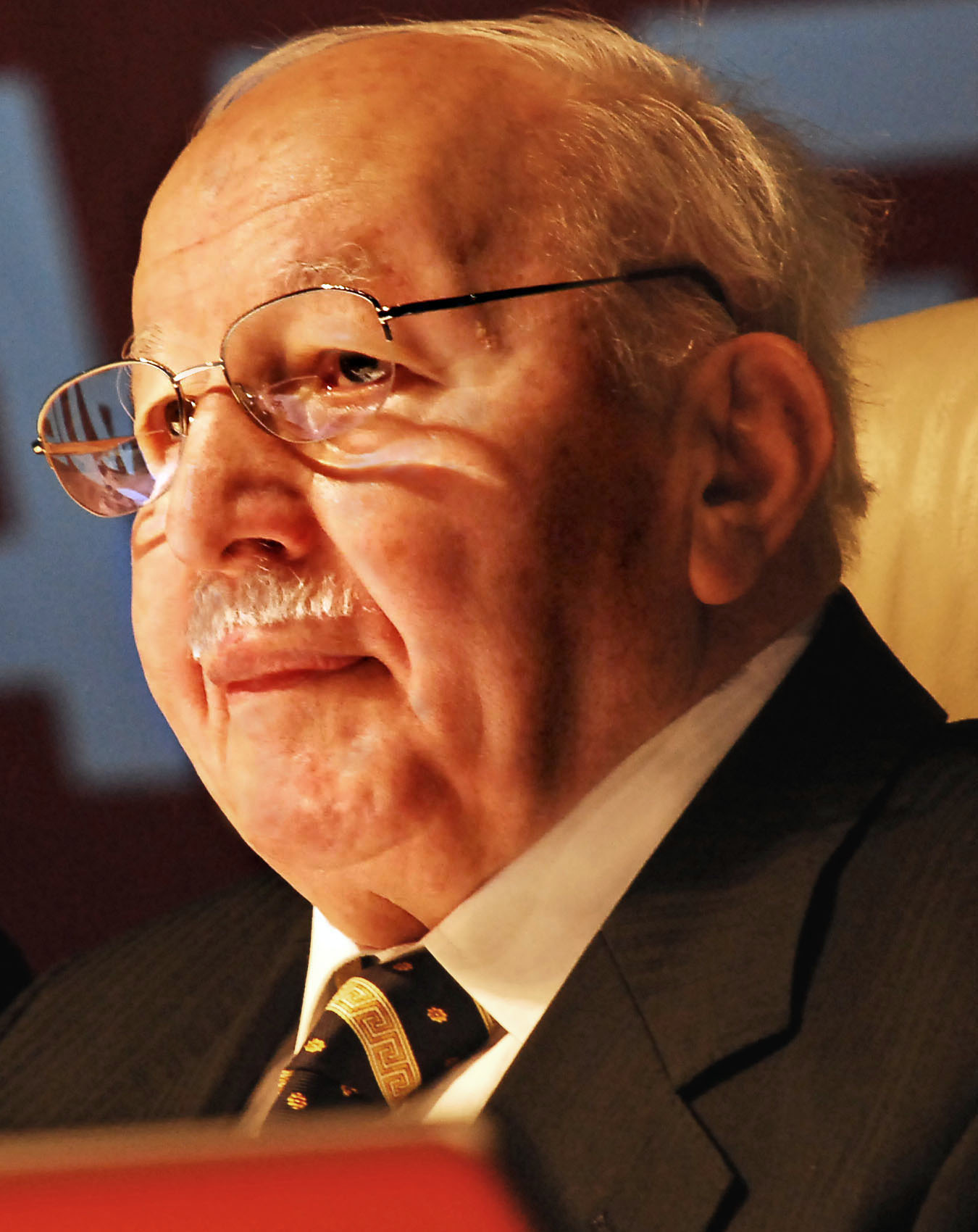

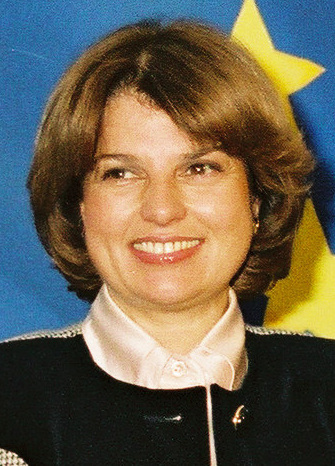

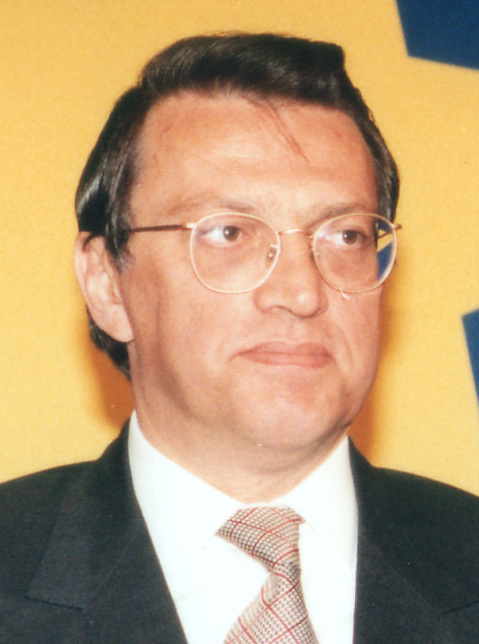

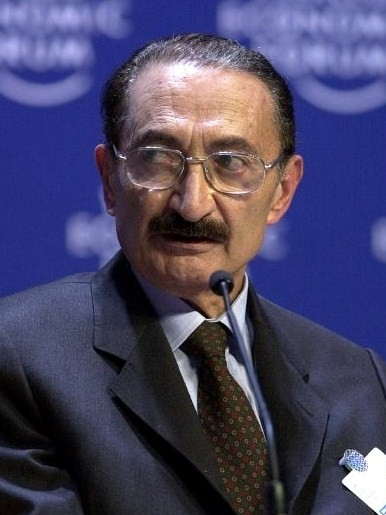

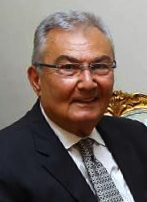
	First party	Second party	Third party
Leader	Necmettin Erbakan	Tansu Çiller	Mesut Yılmaz
Party	RP	DYP	ANAP
Last election	16.88%, 62 seats	27.03%, 178 seats	24.01%, 115 seats
Seats won	158	135	132
Seat change	▲96	▼43	▲17
Popular vote	6,012,450	5,396,009	5,527,288
Percentage	21.38%	19.18%	19.65%
Swing	▲4.50pp	▼7.85pp	▼4.36pp
	Fourth party	Fifth party
Leader	Bülent Ecevit	Deniz Baykal
Party	DSP	CHP
Last election	10.75%, 7 seats	–
Seats won	76	49
Seat change	▲69	New
Popular vote	4,118,025	3,011,076
Percentage	14.64%	10.71%
Swing	▲3.89pp	New
Prime Minister before election
Tansu Çiller
DYP
Elected Prime Minister
Mesut Yılmaz
ANAP

General elections were held in Turkey on Sunday 24 December 1995, triggered by the newly re-established Republican People's Party's (CHP) withdrawal from a coalition government with the True Path Party (DYP). The coalition had been in government for four years, having been formed by the Social Democratic Populist Party, the CHP's predecessor.

The elections inaugurated a 550-member parliament, its largest membership. The religious Welfare Party (RP) had the largest membership but not a majority standing in the body. The Democratic Left Party (DSP) also made significant gains at the expense of the CHP, which barely crossed the election barrier. The election was also the first time an openly Kurdish party – the People's Democracy Party – contested. It was the leading party in several provinces, but won no seats due to failing to cross the 10% electoral threshold.

== Background ==
In 1993 several prominent political figures died. Investigative journalist Uğur Mumcu was assassinated on 24 January, while there was also an increase in the violence of the conflicts with the Kurdistan Workers' Party. President Turgut Özal died on 17 April and was replaced by Süleyman Demirel. On 2 July, shortly before the Tansu Çiller government was about to receive a vote of confidence, thirty-seven people, mostly Alevis, who were in Sivas for the Pir Sultan Abdal festival, were burned to death by a radical Islamist group in the Madımak Hotel following a four-hour siege in what became known as the Sivas massacre.

The debt-based neoliberal economic policies of the Özal governments hit the wall in 1988, and foreign debts rose from $41 billion to $67 billion between 1988 and 1993. On 14 January 1994, an economic crisis was triggered when Moody's downgraded Turkey's credit rating. The dollar suddenly rose from 15,000 Turkish lira to 38,000. The stock market crashed, and the 5 April decisions were taken by the Çiller government. Inflation exceeded 100 percent. The government attempted a bailout through a loan from the IMF. Despite the magnitude of the destruction, the government could not prevent the poor people from getting poorer.

In the 1994 local elections, the True Path Party received the most votes, with a vote share of 21.4%, the Motherland Party was second with 21%, and Necmettin Erbakan's Welfare Party third with 19%. The rise of the Welfare Party resulted in the emergence of key figures in Turkish politics, who continued to influence Turkish politics for many years. The Welfare Party won the mayoralty of Istanbul with Recep Tayyip Erdoğan with Melih Gökçek from the Social Democratic Populist Party (SHP). According to Tanıl Bora, the Welfare Party rose to the status of a major party in the 1994 local elections and became a force that polarized the political system.

On 18 February 1995 the Social Democratic Populist Party, led by Erdal İnönü, merged with the Republican People's Party. With Deniz Baykal becoming the leader of the CHP, Çiller agreed to a coalition with the CHP. But Baykal wanted to be present. One of the conditions of Baykal was early elections, which followed in December 1995.

== Results ==
Party	Votes	%	Seats	+/–
Welfare Party	6,012,450	21.38	158	+96
Motherland Party	5,527,288	19.65	132	+17
True Path Party	5,396,009	19.18	135	–43
Democratic Left Party	4,118,025	14.64	76	+69
Republican People's Party	3,011,076	10.71	49	New
Nationalist Movement Party	2,301,343	8.18	0	New
People's Democracy Party	1,171,623	4.17	0	New
New Democracy Movement	133,889	0.48	0	New
Nation Party	127,630	0.45	0	New
Rebirth Party	95,484	0.34	0	New
Workers' Party	61,428	0.22	0	New
New Party	36,853	0.13	0	New
Independents	133,895	0.48	0	0
Total	28,126,993	100.00	550	+100
Valid votes	28,126,993	96.65		
Invalid/blank votes	974,476	3.35		
Total votes	29,101,469	100.00		
Registered voters/turnout	34,155,981	85.20		
Source: Nohlen et al.

== Aftermath ==
=== Coalition of Ordered government ===
Not since before the declaration of the republic had a blatantly religious party emerged as the largest political force in Turkey. There were fears of the secular armed forces refusing to accept the election result, perhaps even launching yet another coup. As a national debate waged, Tansu Çiller's government stayed on, eventually agreeing with Mesut Yılmaz's Motherland Party (ANAP) to form a minority coalition in March 1996, some three months after the election.

The ANAP–DYP coalition was toppled by an Welfare Party censure motion in June, forcing President Demirel to choose between calling a fresh election or asking Welfare's leader Erbakan to form a government. He chose the latter, and the DYP switched allegiances to form Turkey's first Islamist government with the RP in June 1996. This government was soon overthrown by the Turkish Armed Forces in what was known as the "Postmodern Coup."

=== CHP decline ===
The newly reformed CHP had withdrawn as junior partner of a four-year coalition with the DYP to contest an election on an agenda that boasted its Kemalist and centre-left history. The gamble turned out to be a disaster; far from returning to government, the CHP became the smallest party in parliament with a loss of nationalist votes to the MHP and left-wing votes to the DSP. The party's unpopularity led to its complete ejection from parliament in the next elections in 1999.
