= Mehmet Metiner =

Turkish politician (born 1960)

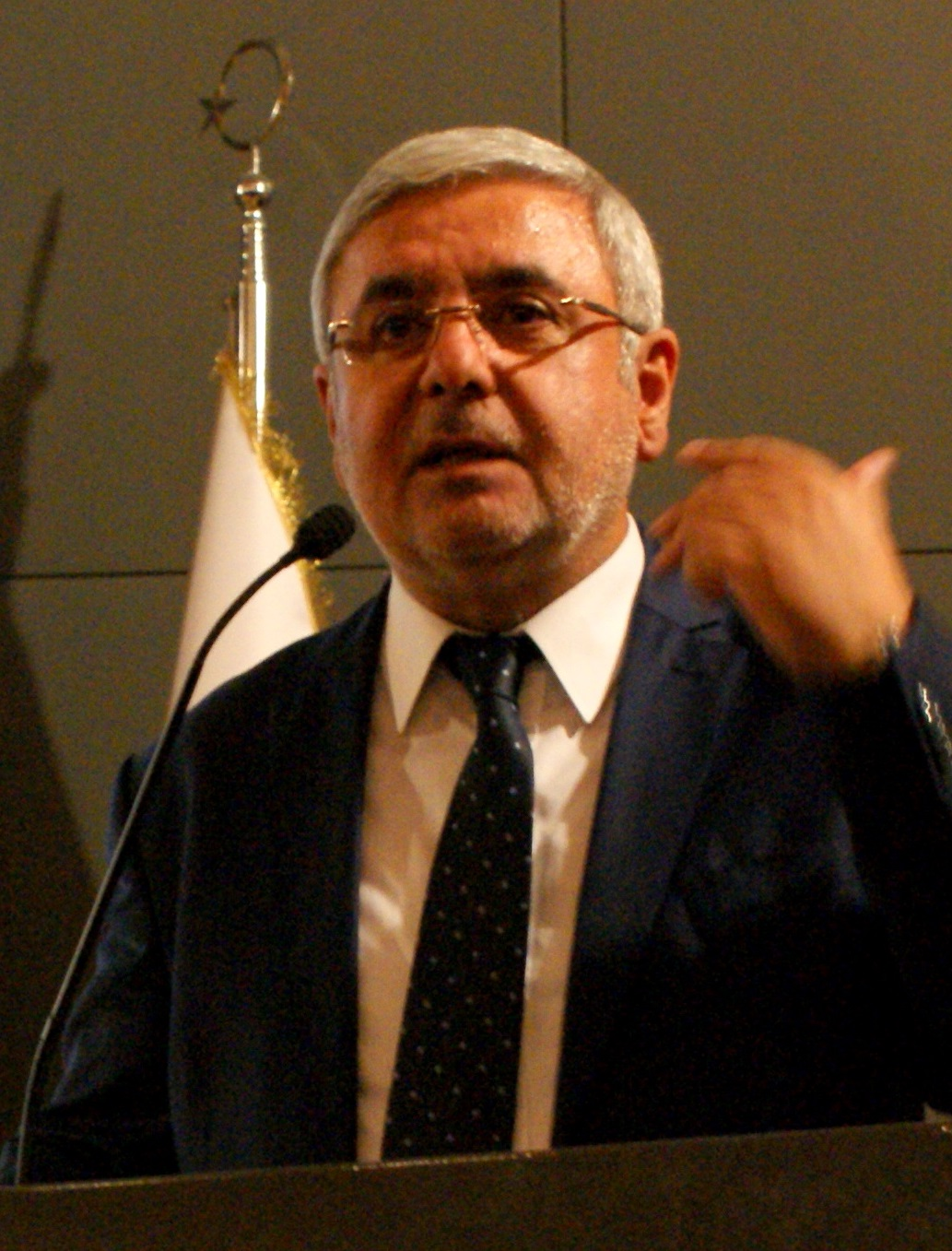
- Metiner speaking in 2015

Personal details
- Born: March 5, 1960 (age 66) Adıyaman, Turkey
- Citizenship: Turkey
- Party: Welfare Party (1995–1998); Virtue Party (1998–2000); HADEP (2000–2001); AKP (2011–present)
- Spouse: Safiye Metiner

Mehmet Metiner (born March 5, 1960) is a Turkish-Kurdish journalist, writer, and politician. He started his political career as an Islamist but joined many parties during his career.

== Personal life ==
Mehmet Metiner was born on March 5, 1960, in the Kahta district of Adıyaman, Turkey, as the child of Kurdish couple Bedir and Nazı Metiner. He graduated from the Faculty of Letters at Istanbul University . He was the editor-in-chief of the journals Girişim, Yeni Zemin and Sahne, which increased his popularity among Islamists.

He began his career by joining Necmettin Erbakan's Welfare Party in 1995 until it was banned in 1998. He joined the Virtue Party right after. He would leave the Virtue Party in 2000, a year before it also got banned by the Turkish government. In 2000, he joined the mostly Kurdish HADEP but would leave it in less than a year. From 2001 until 2011, he remained without a party. In 2011, he entered the parliament as an AKP deputy. He participated in the 2011, June 2015 and November 2015 Turkish general elections.

He was a candidate for deputy from the AKP in the 2018 Turkish general elections, but was not nominated. Earlier in his career he served as the advisor of Recep Tayyip Erdoğan and Recai Kutan, Chairman of the Virtue Party, when he was the Provincial President of the Welfare Party and the mayor of the metropolitan municipality. He served as the vice chairman of HADEP from 2000 to 2001. He was elected as AKP Adıyaman deputy in the elections held in 2011. Mehmet Metiner started to write for the Pro-AKP Star newspaper as of 30 December 2014. In the elections held in 2015, he was elected as the AKP Istanbul deputy.
