= Salih Fırat =

Turkish politician (born 1960)

Salih Fırat MP

Member of the Grand National Assembly
- In office 28 June 2011 – 16 May 2018
- Constituency: Adıyaman (2011, June 2015, Nov 2015)

Personal details
- Born: 1 January 1960 (age 66) Adıyaman, Turkey
- Party: Republican People's Party (CHP) 2011-2013; Justice and Development Party (AKP) 2013-present
- Education: Ankara University
- Occupation: Politician
- Profession: Medical doctor

Salih Fırat (born 1 January 1960) is a Turkish politician of Kurdish origin from the Justice and Development Party (AKP), who has served as a Member of Parliament for Adıyaman 28 June 2011 to 16 May 2018.

== Early life and career ==
Born in Adıyaman, he graduated from Ankara University Faculty of Medicine and worked in hospitals in İzmir, Ordu and Adıyaman as an expert on orthopedics and traumatology. He was also a member of the Adıyaman Sports Club executive board and was the club's doctor. He is a member of the Human Rights Foundation.

== Political career ==
First elected as a CHP Member of Parliament in the 2011 general election, he resigned from the CHP and joined the AKP in 2013 after accusing CHP politicians of making racist remarks against Kurds. He was re-elected as an MP, this time from the AKP party list, in the June 2015 general election.

== See also ==
- 24th Parliament of Turkey
- 25th Parliament of Turkey
