= New Party (Turkey, 1993) =

New Party Yeni Parti
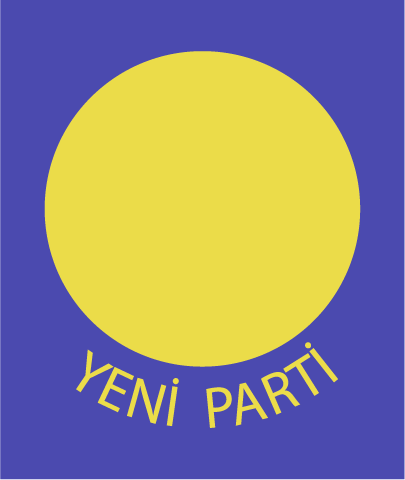
- Abbreviation: YP
- Leader: Yusuf Bozkurt Özal
- Founded: 7 October 1993
- Dissolved: 21 November 1997
- Split from: Motherland Party
- Merged into: Democrat Party
- Ideology: Liberalism; Özalism
- Political position: Centre-right

New Party (Turkish: Yeni Parti) was a Turkish political party.

After Turgut Özal was elected as the President of Turkey, he resigned from the Motherland Party (ANAP) because of constitutional reasons. On 30 November 1992, he was replaced by Mesut Yılmaz. Next day, Yusuf Bozkurt Özal, Turgut Özal's younger brother, together with a group of deputies resigned from ANAP. On 7 October 1993, Yusuf Bozkurt Özal founded the New Party. However, in the general elections held on 24 December 1995, the party could receive only 0.13% of votes. After this defeat, the party was merged to another party in 1997 November.
