= Çankırı Karatekin University =

Public university in Çankırı, Turkey

Coordinates: 40.5959°N 33.6075°E

- Established: 2007
- Location: Çankırı, Turkey
- Website: Official website

Çankırı Karatekin University (Turkish: Çankırı Karatekin Üniversitesi) is a university located in Çankırı, Turkey. It was established in 2007.

On September 10, 2008, President Abdullah Gül appointed Ali İbrahim Savaş as rector of Çankırı Karatekin University. On September 6, 2012, Gül reappointed Savaş as rector of Çankırı Karatekin University for a second term. On March 11, 2017, President Recep Tayyip Erdoğan appointed Hasan Ayrancı as rector, and after one term, on April 21, 2021, he appointed Harun Çiftçi as rector of Çankırı Karatekin University.
