= Nationalist Task Party =

Nationalist Task Party Milliyetçi Çalışma Partisi
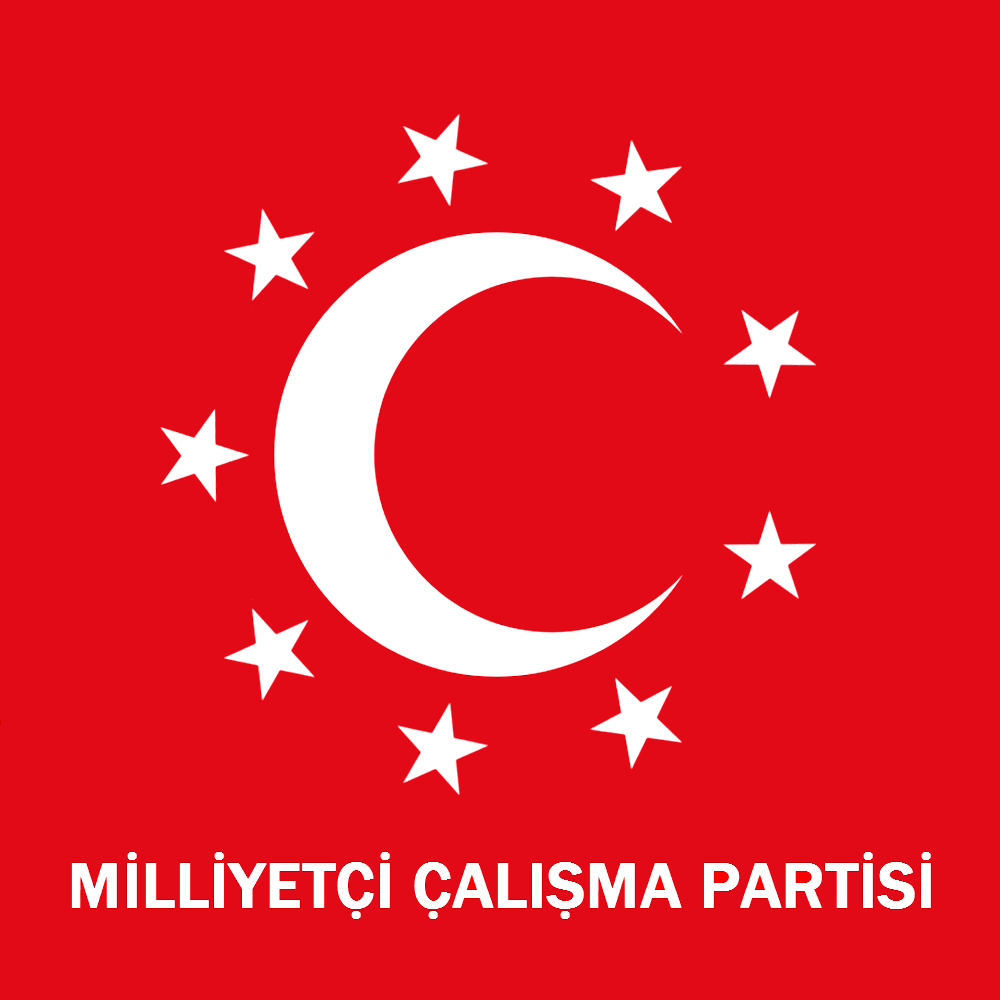
- Abbreviation: MÇP
- Founder: Ali Koç
- Founded: 30 November 1985
- Dissolved: 24 January 1993
- Preceded by: Conservative Party
- Succeeded by: Great Union Party; Nationalist Movement Party
- Ideology: Turkish nationalism Turkish–Islamic synthesis Cultural nationalism Social conservatism National conservatism Neo-Ottomanism; Pan-Turkism; Turanism; Idealism
- Political position: Far-right
- Colors: Red and White (official); Ruby red (customary)

The Nationalist Task Party or Nationalist Labour Party (Turkish: Milliyetçi Çalışma Partisi) was a far-right political party in Turkey.

== History ==
=== In the 1980s ===
The Nationalist Task Party was founded on 30 November 1985, when its predecessor, the Conservative Party, changed its name. Its first president was Ali Koç. The party sought the votes of the far-right Nationalist Movement Party which had been banned in 1980. Former MSP member Abdülkerim Doğru became chairman on 19 April 1987. Alparslan Türkeş, the founder of the neo-fascist Grey Wolves, became party chairman on 4 October 1987 with the lifting of the political ban on former politicians. The Nationalist Task Party won 2.9% of the popular vote in 1987 general election, and they won three municipalities (Elazığ, Erzincan, Yozgat) in the 1989 local elections.

=== 1991 general elections ===
The party made an alliance dubbed "Holy Alliance" with the Islamist Welfare Party and the right-wing Nationalist Reformist Democracy Party on 20 October 1991 general elections. However, in 1991, according to election rules, no more than two parties could form an alliance. So MÇP's and IDP's deputy candidates attended with Welfare Party lists. This alliance won 16.9% vote and sent 62 MPs to the Turkish Grand National Assembly (which had a total of 550 seats).

=== Dissolution of the party ===
Delegates decided to dissolve the party on 27 December 1992 and the party dissolved on 24 January 1993. All members joined the newly opened (and refounded) Nationalist Movement Party.
