= 1989 Turkish local elections =

Mayoral/parliamentary polls

- 26 March 1989
	Majority party	Minority party	Third party
Leader	Erdal İnönü	Süleyman Demirel	Turgut Özal
Party	SHP	DYP	ANAP
Popular vote	6,354,252	5,565,776	4,828,164
Percentage	28.69%	25.13%	21.80%
	Fourth party	Fifth party	Sixth party
Leader	Necmettin Erbakan	Bülent Ecevit	Alparslan Türkeş
Party	RP	DSP	MÇP
Popular vote	2,170,431	1,998,819	916,405
Percentage	9,80%	9.03%	4.14%
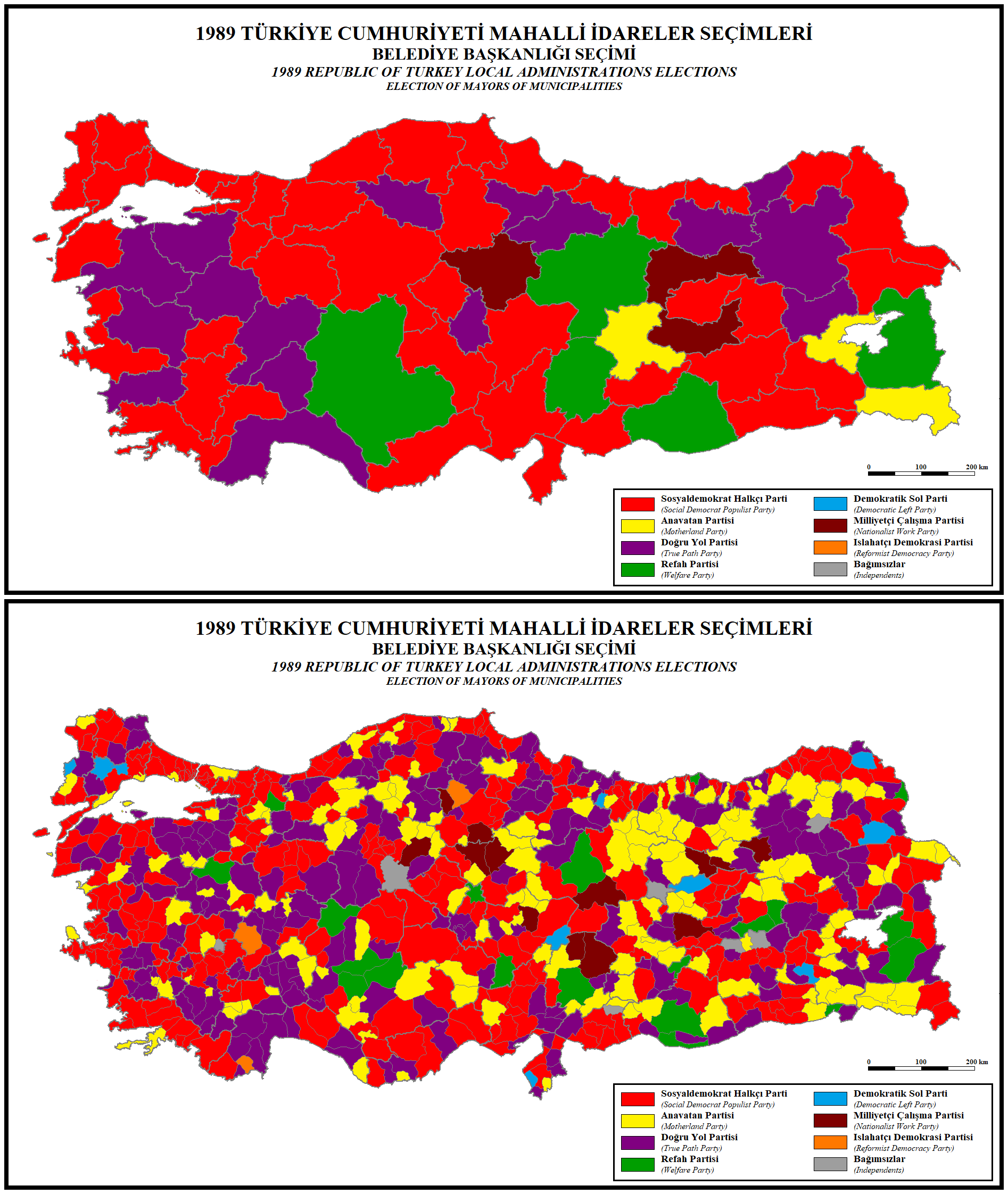

Local elections were held in Turkey on 26 March 1989. In the elections, both the mayors and the local city councilmembers (Turkish: İl Genel Meclisi) were elected. The figures presented below are the results of the local parliament elections.

== Results ==
In the elections, the ANAP suffered a nationwide rout in what many saw as a referendum on the Özal administration. Social Democratic Populist Party (Turkey) won the popular vote and most major cities.

=== Provincial assemblies ===
Party	Votes	%
Social Democratic Populist Party	6,354,252	28.69
True Path Party	5,565,776	25.13
Motherland Party	4,828,164	21.80
Welfare Party	2,170,431	9.80
Democratic Left Party	1,998,819	9.03
Nationalist Task Party	916,405	4.14
Reformist Democracy Party	208,725	0.94
Independents	103,755	0.47
Total	22,146,327	100.00

=== Metropolitan center mayors ===
Metropolitan center	Mayor	Party
Adana	Selahattin Çolak	SHP
Ankara	Murat Karayalçın	SHP
Bursa	Teoman Özalp	DYP
Gaziantep	Celal Doğan	SHP
Istanbul	Nurettin Sözen	SHP
İzmir	Yüksel Çakmur	SHP
Kayseri	Niyazi Bahçeci	SHP
Konya	Halil Ürün	RP

=== Mayor of other centers ===
Province	Party
Adapazarı	SHP
Adıyaman	SHP
Afyonkarahisar	DYP
Ağrı	SHP
Amasya	DYP
Antalya	DYP
Artvin	SHP
Aydın	DYP
Balıkesir	DYP
Bilecik	SHP
Bingöl	SHP
Bitlis	ANAP
Bolu	SHP
Burdur	SHP
Çanakkale	SHP

Province	Party
Çankırı	DYP
Çorum	SHP
Denizli	SHP
Diyarbakır	SHP
Edirne	SHP
Elazığ	MÇP
Erzincan	MÇP
Erzurum	DYP
Eskişehir	SHP
Giresun	SHP
Gümüşhane	DYP
Hakkâri	ANAP
Hatay	SHP
Isparta	DYP
İzmit	SHP

Province	Party
Kars	SHP
Kastamonu	SHP
Kırklareli	SHP
Kırşehir	SHP
Kütahya	DYP
Malatya	ANAP
Manisa	DYP
Mersin	SHP
Kahramanmaraş	RP
Mardin	SHP
Muğla	SHP
Muş	DYP
Nevşehir	DYP
Niğde	SHP
Ordu	SHP

Province	Party
Rize	DYP
Samsun	SHP
Siirt	SHP
Sinop	SHP
Sivas	RP
Tekirdağ	SHP
Tokat	DYP
Trabzon	SHP
Tunceli	IND.
Şanlıurfa	RP
Uşak	SHP
Van	RP
Yozgat	MÇP
Zonguldak	SHP
