= 1977 Turkish local elections =

- 11 December 1977
	Majority party	Minority party	Third party
Leader	Bülent Ecevit	Süleyman Demirel	Necmettin Erbakan
Party	CHP	AP	MSP
Popular vote	5,161,426	4,589,268	854,436
Percentage	41.72%	37.10%	6.90%
	Fourth party
Leader	Alparslan Türkeş
Party	MHP
Popular vote	819,136
Percentage	6.62%
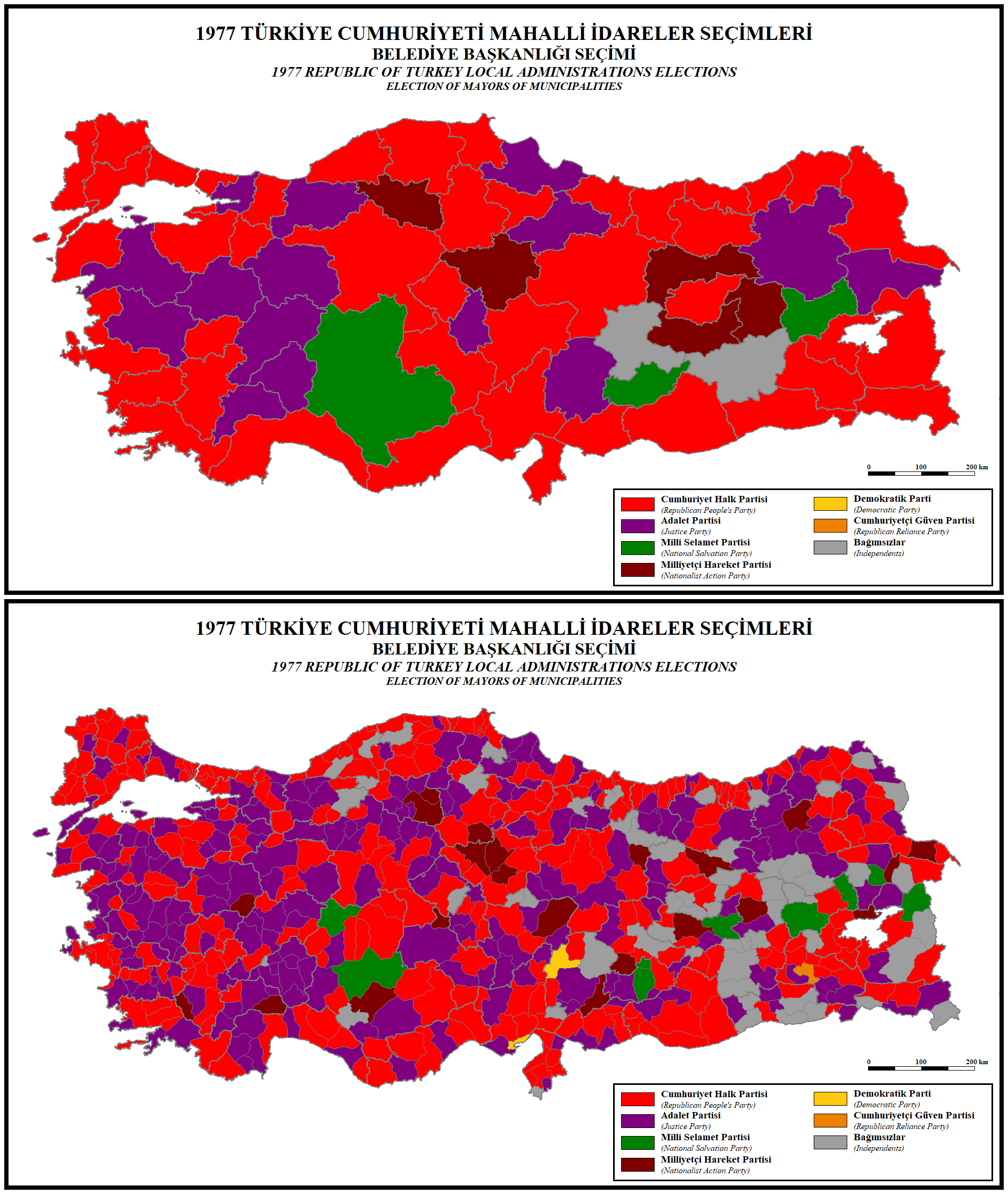

Local elections were held in Turkey on 11 December 1977. In the elections, both the mayors and the local parliaments (Turkish: İl Genel Meclisi) were elected. The figures presented below are the results of the local parliament elections.

== Results ==
=== Provincial assemblies ===
Party	Votes	%
Republican People's Party	5,161,426	41.73
Justice Party	4,589,268	37.10
National Salvation Party	854,436	6.91
Nationalist Movement Party	819,136	6.62
Democratic Party	123,717	1.00
Republican Reliance Party	78,047	0.63
Workers' Party of Turkey	63,477	0.51
Turkey Unity Party	29,039	0.23
Socialist Workers' Party of Turkey	28,994	0.23
Socialist Revolution Party	4,056	0.03
Independents	618,030	5.00
Total	12,369,626	100.00

=== Mayors ===
Province	Party
Adana	CHP
Adapazarı	CHP
Adıyaman	MSP
Afyonkarahisar	AP
Ağrı	AP
Amasya	CHP
Ankara	CHP
Antalya	CHP
Artvin	CHP
Aydın	CHP
Balıkesir	AP
Bilecik	CHP
Bingöl	MHP
Bitlis	CHP
Bolu	AP
Burdur	AP
Bursa	CHP

Province	Party
Çanakkale	CHP
Çankırı	MHP
Çorum	CHP
Denizli	CHP
Diyarbakır	IND.
Edirne	CHP
Elazığ	MHP
Erzincan	MHP
Erzurum	CHP
Eskişehir	AP
Gaziantep	CHP
Giresun	CHP
Gümüşhane	CHP
Hakkâri	CHP
Hatay	CHP
Isparta	AP
Istanbul	CHP

Province	Party
İzmir	CHP
İzmit	AP
Kars	CHP
Kastamonu	CHP
Kayseri	CHP
Kırklareli	CHP
Kırşehir	CHP
Konya	MSP
Kütahya	AP
Malatya	IND.
Manisa	AP
Mersin	CHP
Kahramanmaraş	AP
Mardin	CHP
Muğla	CHP
Muş	MSP
Nevşehir	AP

Province	Party
Niğde	CHP
Ordu	CHP
Rize	CHP
Samsun	AP
Siirt	CHP
Sinop	CHP
Sivas	CHP
Tekirdağ	CHP
Tokat	AP
Trabzon	CHP
Tunceli	CHP
Şanlıurfa	CHP
Uşak	CHP
Van	CHP
Yozgat	MHP
Zonguldak	CHP
