= Resul Kurt =

Turkish engineer and politician

Member of the Grand National Assembly of Turkey
- Incumbent
- Assumed office 2 June 2023
- Constituency: Istanbul

Personal details
- Party: Justice and Development Party (Turkey)
- Education: Istanbul University
- Occupation: Politician, engineer

Resul Kurt is a Turkish engineer and politician who has served as a member of Parliament in the Grand National Assembly of Turkey since 2023. Kurt was elected as an MP for Istanbul in the 2023 Turkish general election, representing the Justice and Development Party (AK Party). Kurt is a graduate of Istanbul University's Faculty of Engineering.
