= 1994 Turkish local elections =

- 27 March 1994

All 3,215 district municipalities and 16 metropolitan municipalities of Turkey
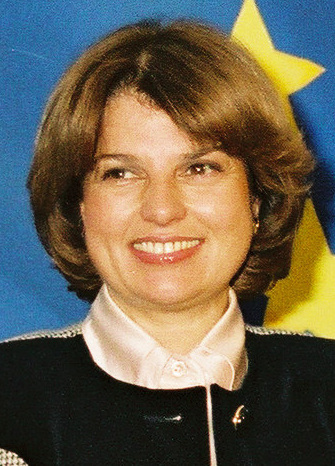

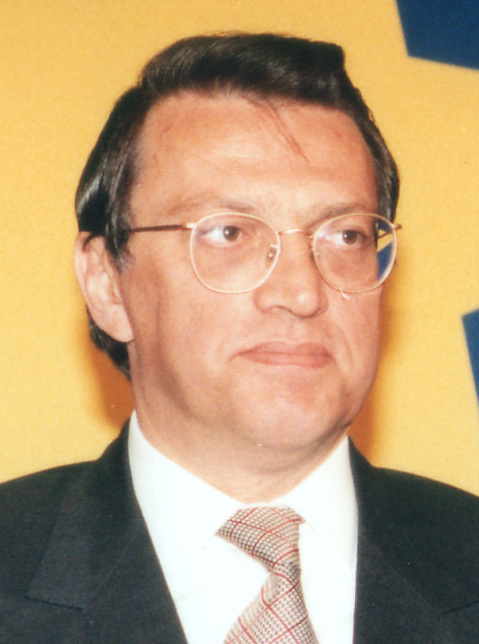

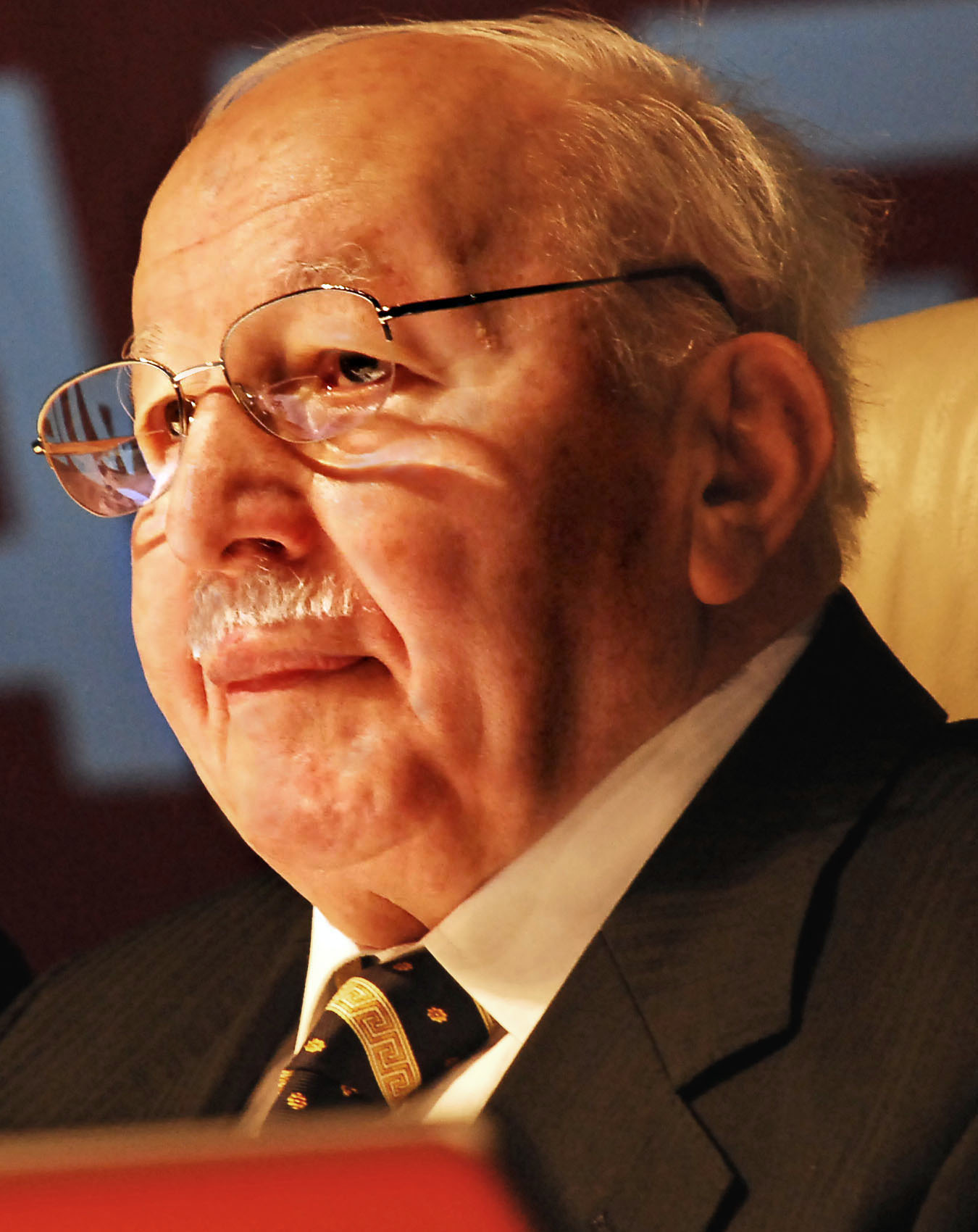

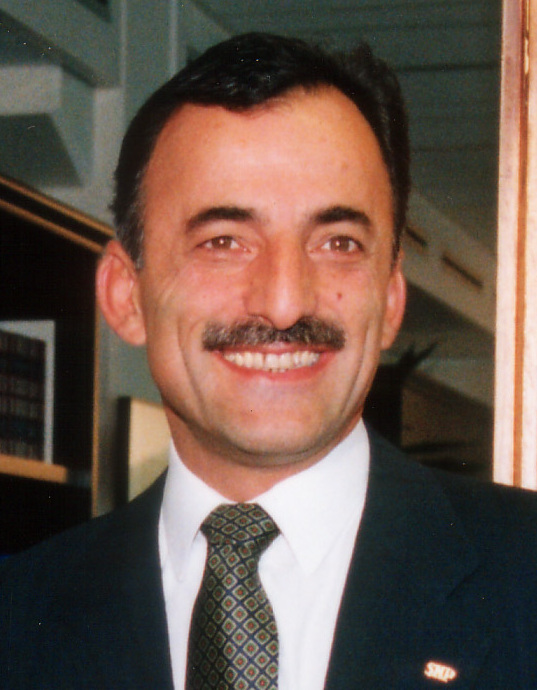

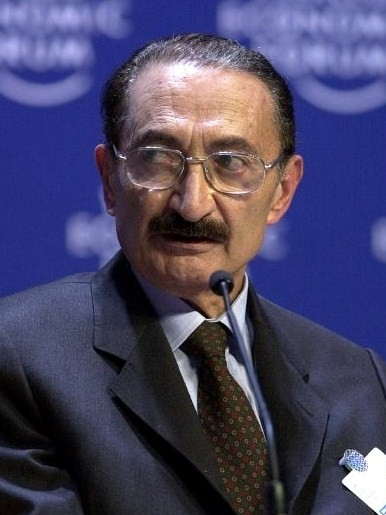
	Majority party	Minority party	Third party
Leader	Tansu Çiller	Mesut Yılmaz	Necmettin Erbakan
Party	DYP	ANAP	RP
Last election	23.13%	21.80%	9.80%
Popular vote	6,027,095	5,937,031	5,388,195
Percentage	21.40%	21.08%	19.13%
Swing	▼3.73pp	▼0.72pp	▲9.33pp
	Fourth party	Fifth party	Sixth party
Leader	Murat Karayalçın	Bülent Ecevit	Alparslan Türkeş
Party	SHP	DSP	MHP
Last election	28,69%	9.03%	–
Popular vote	3,807,921	2,463,853	2,239,117
Percentage	13,52%	8.75%	7.95%
Swing	▼15.17pp	▼0.27pp	New
	Seventh party
Leader	Deniz Baykal
Party	CHP
Last election	–
Popular vote	1,297,371
Percentage	4,61%
Swing	New
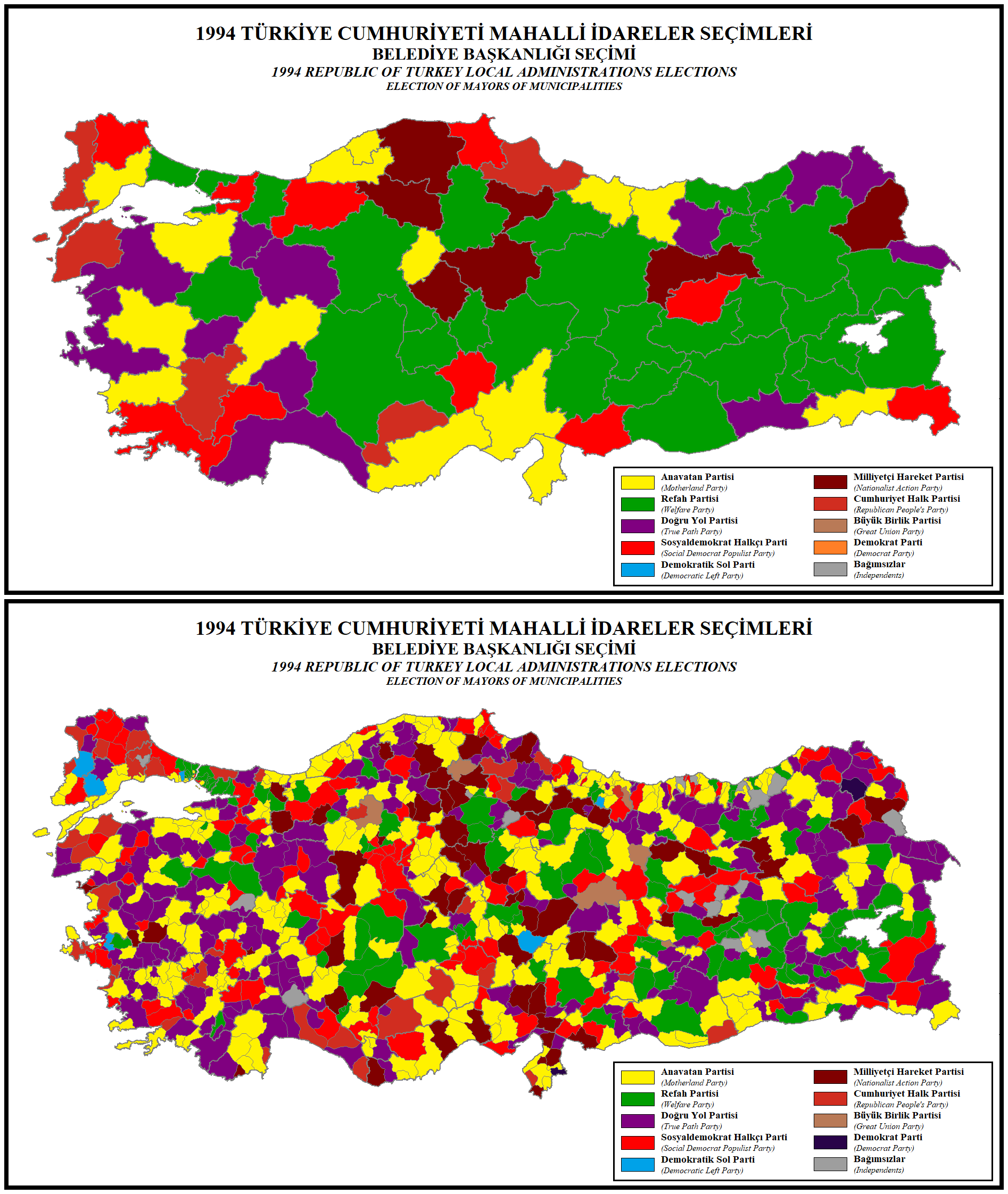

Local elections were held in Turkey on 27 March 1994.

== Background ==
=== 1989 local elections ===
In the 1989 Turkish local elections, ANAP suffered a nationwide rout in what many saw as a referendum on the Turgut Özal administration. Nurettin Sözen, a doctor from the center-left Social Democratic People’s Party (SHP) became Istanbul's mayor, creating hopes for the left’s nationwide rise. The SHP promised a break from the past with its platform focused on clean government and anti-corruption. But under the new administration, things only appeared to get worse. For one thing, Istanbul's population nearly doubled in the 1990s, creating massive demand for public services.

=== Istanbul in the 1990s ===
Istanbul had a large garbage problem in the 1990s and it reached a new high with the Üsküdar garbage explosion when a trash heap in a slum neighborhood exploded. Methane gas had built up beneath the filth, finally igniting and causing an avalanche that killed 27 of the hapless poor. Also, that winter the air was filled with soot from the millions of coal-burning ovens that families were using to heat their homes. Many began wearing surgical masks before going outside.

=== The İSKİ Scandal ===
Three years into Sözen’s term, the İSKİ Scandal broke out. Ergün Göknel, a Sözen appointee who ran the Istanbul Water and Sewerage Administration (İSKİ) had divorced his wife in 1992 to marry an İSKİ employee three decades his junior, offering his wife a divorce settlement valued in the hundreds of thousands of dollars. But his former wife was not content to console herself quietly with her new fortune. She went to the press to declare the size of the settlement, which was far too large for a public servant to afford, and to voice her suspicions about her husband’s alleged illicit dealings. This triggered a flurry of speculation in the press about corruption in İSKİ and the SHP, and Turkey’s prosecutors sprang into action, preparing a handful of high-profile cases against leftist leaders. While İSKİ burned, Göknel married his new wife at the Istanbul Hilton, the city’s first American-built deluxe hotel. Mayor Sözen, infuriated, removed Göknel from his post and declared that he would support the harshest disciplinary action against any corrupt dealings uncovered in a criminal investigation. It was a buck too short, a day too late: the Turkish left, already weakened due to anti-leftist measures implemented in the aftermath of the 1980 coup, died in Istanbul in 1994.

=== Rise of Erdoğan ===
The İSKİ Scandal was unfolding during the peak of the local-elections season, and with every detail it seemed to prove what Necmettin Erbakan and his Welfare Party had been saying all along: that the people were suffering because they were governed by elites whose moral fiber had been rotted by Western ways. Turkey’s leaders were too busy fleecing the public and having affairs with each other to bother themselves with the problems of the suffering masses.

Erdogan’s 1994 campaign played upon these themes with tremendous virtuosity. He called the RP the “voice of the silent masses.” While other parties lacked the grassroots infrastructure to communicate directly with the residents of Istanbul’s shanty towns, the RP machine could interact with them at a highly granular level, thanks to its vast database. Populism, too, helped the RP’s cause. The party pledged to keep bread prices low through municipally subsidized bread factories, and RP representatives handed out coal and groceries in poor neighborhoods, once again taking advantage of their computerized database. It was said that one RP lieutenant even handed out gold coins to prospective voters.

== Results ==
The 1994 nationwide local elections showed that the vast majority of the voting public was still not comfortable with the Islamist RP alternative, even when the establishment parties were at their worst.

=== Provincial assemblies ===
Party	Votes	%
True Path Party	6,027,095	21.41
Motherland Party	5,937,031	21.09
Welfare Party	5,388,195	19.14
Social Democratic Populist Party	3,807,921	13.53
Democratic Left Party	2,463,853	8.75
Nationalist Movement Party	2,239,117	7.95
Republican People's Party	1,297,371	4.61
Great Unity Party	355,271	1.26
Democratic Party	148,719	0.53
Nation Party	126,118	0.45
Rebirth Party	104,285	0.37
Socialist Unity Party	80,714	0.29
Workers' Party	79,588	0.28
Independent	96,913	0.34
Total	28,152,191	100.00

=== Metropolitan municipality mayors ===
Metropolitan municipality	Mayor	Party
Adana	Aytaç Durak	Motherland Party (ANAP)
Ankara	Melih Gökçek	Welfare Party (RP)
Antalya	Hasan Subaşı	True Path Party (DYP)
Bursa	Erdem Saker	Motherland Party (ANAP)
Diyarbakır	Ahmet Bilgin	Welfare Party (RP)
Erzurum	Ersan Gemalmaz	Welfare Party (RP)
Eskişehir	Aydın Arat	True Path Party (DYP)
Gaziantep	Celal Doğan	Social Democratic Populist Party (SHP)
Istanbul	Recep Tayyip Erdoğan	Welfare Party (RP)
İzmir	Burhan Özfatura	True Path Party (DYP)
Kayseri	Şükrü Karatepe	Welfare Party (RP)
Kocaeli	Sefa Sirmen	Social Democratic Populist Party (SHP)
Konya	Halil Ürün	Welfare Party (RP)
Mersin	Okan Merzeci	Motherland Party (ANAP)
Samsun	Muzaffer Önder	Republican People's Party (CHP)

=== Mayor of other municipalities ===
Province	Party
Adıyaman	RP
Afyonkarahisar	ANAP
Ağrı	RP
Aksaray	RP
Amasya	MHP
Ardahan	DYP
Artvin	DYP
Aydın	ANAP
Balıkesir	DYP
Bartın	ANAP
Batman	RP
Bayburt	RP
Bilecik	DYP
Bingöl	RP
Bitlis	RP
Bolu	SHP

Province	Party
Burdur	SHP
Çanakkale	CHP
Çankırı	MHP
Çorum	RP
Denizli	CHP
Edirne	CHP
Elazığ	RP
Erzincan	MHP
Giresun	ANAP
Gümüşhane	DYP
Hakkâri	SHP
Hatay	ANAP
Iğdır	DYP
Isparta	DYP
Karaman	CHP

Province	Party
Kars	MHP
Kastamonu	MHP
Kırıkkale	ANAP
Kırklareli	SHP
Kırşehir	MHP
Kütahya	RP
Malatya	RP
Manisa	ANAP
Kahramanmaraş	RP
Mardin	DYP
Muğla	SHP
Muş	RP
Nevşehir	RP
Niğde	SHP
Ordu	ANAP

Province	Party
Rize	RP
Sakarya	RP
Siirt	RP
Sinop	SHP
Şırnak	ANAP
Sivas	RP
Tekirdağ	ANAP
Tokat	RP
Trabzon	RP
Tunceli	SHP
Şanlıurfa	RP
Uşak	DYP
Van	RP
Yozgat	MHP
Zonguldak	ANAP
