= Reformist Democracy Party =

Reformist Democracy Party Islahatçı Demokrasi Partisi
- Abbreviation: IDP
- Leader: Aykut Edibali
- Founder: Aykut Edibali
- Founded: 22 March 1984
- Dissolved: 23 November 1992
- Succeeded by: Nation Party (Turkey, 1992)
- Ideology: Conservatism; Turkish nationalism National conservatism

The Reformist Democracy Party (Turkish: Islahatçı Demokrasi Partisi, abbreviated IDP) was a right-wing Nationalist political party in Turkey formed on 21 March 1984. In 1991 elections; IDP, Welfare Party and Nationalist Task Party formed an alliance called "Holy Alliance". As a result of a coalition of the three parties, the party was able to gain three seats in the parliament After 1991-1995 term the party failed to gain any seats in the parliament. It was renamed Nation Party on 23 November 1992. Its chairman was Aykut Edibali.
