= 1991 Turkish general election =

- 20 October 1991

All 450 seats in the Grand National Assembly 226 seats needed for a majority
- Turnout: 83.92% (▼9.36pp)
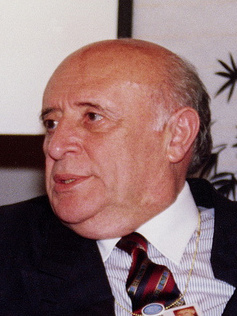

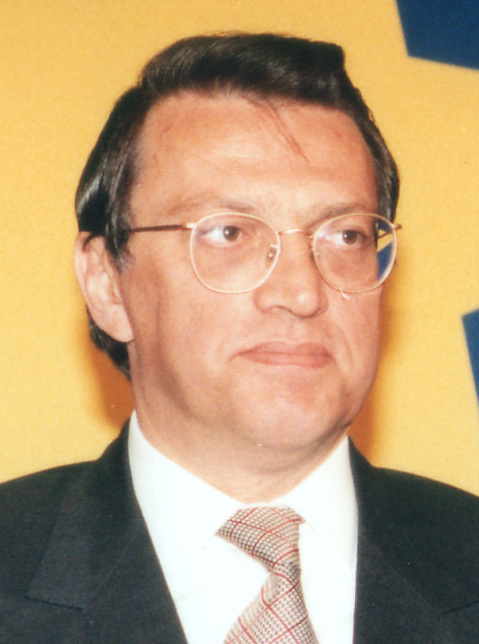

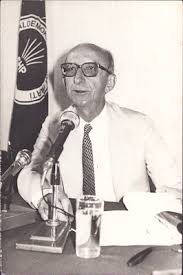

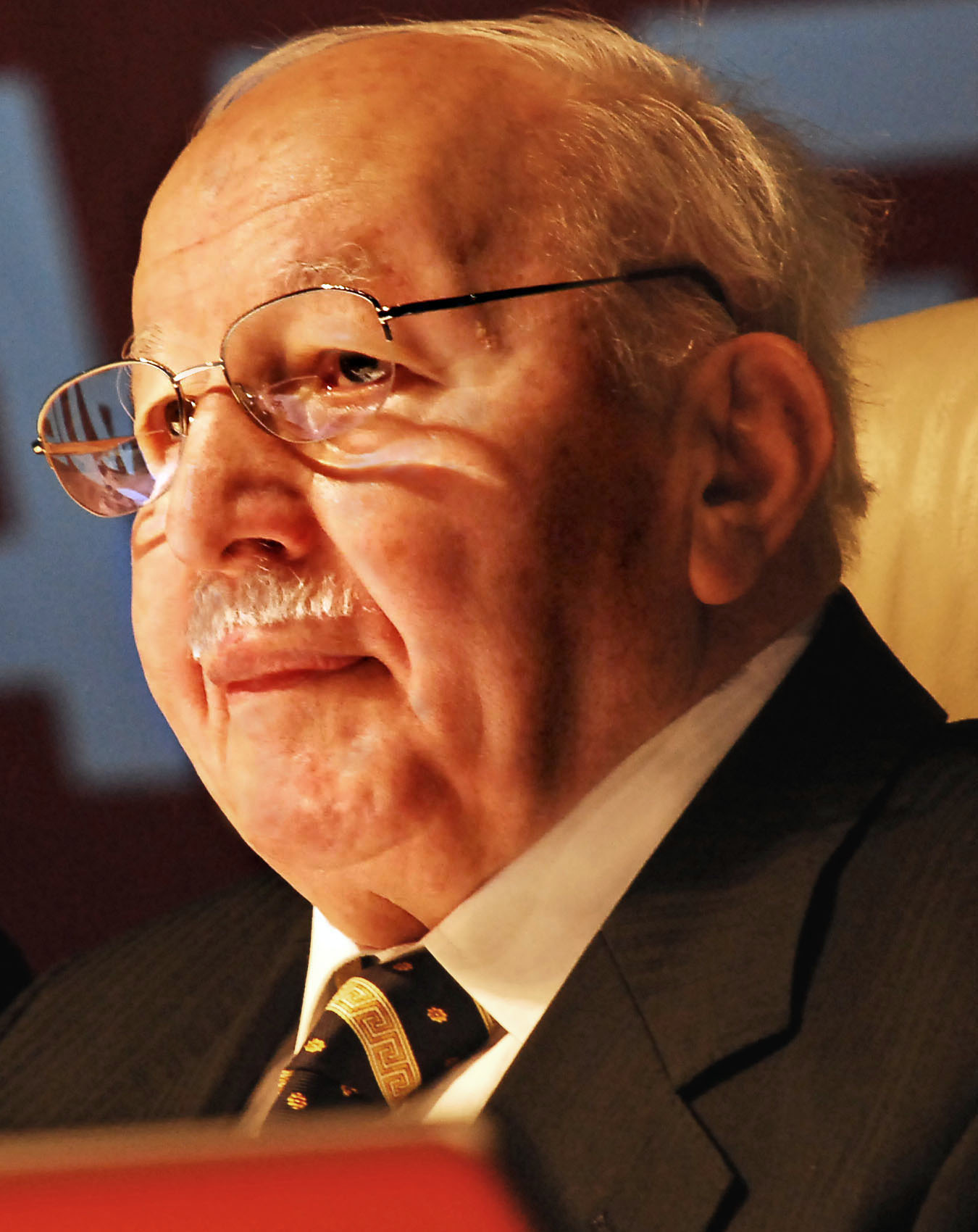

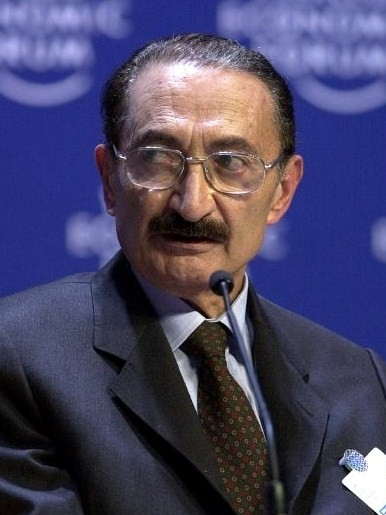
	First party	Second party	Third party
Leader	Süleyman Demirel	Mesut Yılmaz	Erdal İnönü
Party	DYP	ANAP	SHP
Last election	19.14%, 59 seats	36.31%, 292 seats	24.74%, 99 seats
Seats won	178	115	88
Seat change	▲119	▼177	▼11
Popular vote	6,600,726	5,862,623	5,066,571
Percentage	27.03%	24.01%	20.75%
Swing	▲7.89pp	▼12.30pp	▼3.99pp
	Fourth party	Fifth party
Leader	Necmettin Erbakan	Bülent Ecevit
Party	RP	DSP
Last election	7.16%, 0 seats	8.53%, 0 seats
Seats won	62	7
Seat change	▲62	▲7
Popular vote	4,121,355	2,624,301
Percentage	16.88%	10.75%
Swing	▲9.72pp	▲2.22pp
Prime Minister before election
Mesut Yılmaz
ANAP
Elected Prime Minister
Süleyman Demirel
DYP

General elections were held in Turkey on 20 October 1991, to elect members to the 19th Grand National Assembly. It was the first by the ruling Motherland Party to be contested without its founding leader, Turgut Özal, who had become Turkish president two years previously. The result was a swing against Özal's former party in favour of its fierce centre-right rival, the True Path Party led by Süleyman Demirel. The vote saw two additional parties cross the 10 percent barrier to enter parliament. Necmettin Erbakan and his Welfare Party saw a party of religious background returned for the first time in 14 years. Welfare had a greatly increased share of the vote and took several key provinces, including Istanbul in 1994 local elections. Bülent Ecevit's Democratic Left Party also scraped through to win seven seats. Voter turnout was 83.9%.

== Background ==
The diversification of the communication tools in the 1980s and 1990s affected political campaigns. One feature that distinguished the 1991 elections from previous ones was the presence of private television channels and the ability of parties to advertise on television.

An electoral alliance called the "holy alliance" was formed by the Welfare Party, Nationalist Task Party and Reformist Democracy Party to contest the elections.

The pro-Kurdish People's Labour Party (HEP) contested the elections on the Social Democratic Populist Party (SHP) list.

== Results ==
Party	Votes	%	Seats	+/–
True Path Party	6,600,726	27.03	178	+119
Motherland Party	5,862,623	24.01	115	–177
Social Democratic Populist Party	5,066,571	20.75	88	–11
Welfare Party	4,121,355	16.88	62	+62
Democratic Left Party	2,624,301	10.75	7	+7
Socialist Party	108,369	0.44	0	New
Independents	32,721	0.13	0	0
Total	24,416,666	100.00	450	0
Valid votes	24,416,666	97.06		
Invalid/blank votes	740,423	2.94		
Total votes	25,157,089	100.00		
Registered voters/turnout	29,979,123	83.92		
Source: Nohlen et al.
