= Welfare Party =

Islamist political party in Turkey

Welfare Party Refah Partisi
- Founders: Ali Türkmen; Ahmet Tekdal; Necmettin Erbakan
- Founded: 19 July 1983
- Banned: 16 January 1998
- Preceded by: National Salvation Party
- Succeeded by: Virtue Party
- Headquarters: Ankara, Turkey
- Ideology: Millî Görüş; Social conservatism; Islamism; Pan-Islamism
- Political position: Far-right
- Religion: Sunni Islam
- Colors: Red (official); Hot pink (customary)
- Slogan: Justice is our goal

Party flag

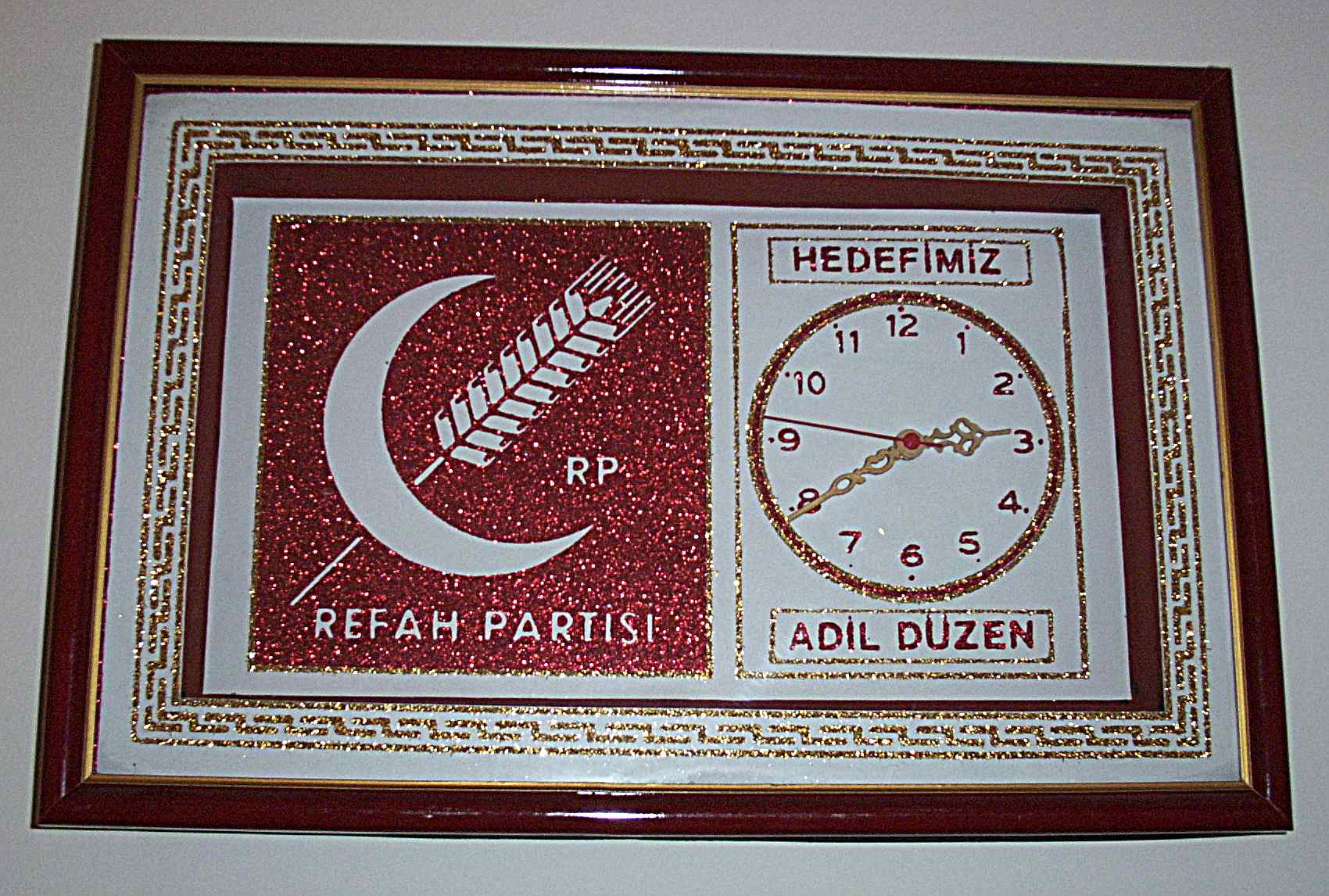
A clock displaying the emblem of the Welfare Party. The party slogan translates as "Justice is our goal."

The Welfare Party (Turkish: Refah Partisi, RP) was an Islamist political party in Turkey. It was founded by Ali Türkmen, Ahmet Tekdal, and Necmettin Erbakan in Ankara in 1983 as heir to two earlier parties, National Order Party (MNP) and National Salvation Party (MSP), which were banned from politics. The RP participated in mayoral elections at that time and won in three cities Konya, Şanlıurfa, and Van. Their vote percentage was approximately 5%.

The Welfare Party participated in the 1991 elections in a triple alliance with the Nationalist Movement Party (MHP) and the Reformist Democracy Party (IDP). They gained 16.9% of the vote. They won 62 deputies to parliament, but 19 deputies of MHP (with founding Democratic Movement Party on 25 December 1991 and joining the MÇP on 29 December 1991) and 3 of IDP left the Welfare Party after the election. Their popular vote increased over the years until they became the largest party under Prime Minister Necmettin Erbakan in 1996. The coalition government of Erbakan was forced out of power by the Turkish military in 1997, due to being suspected of having an Islamist agenda.

In 1998, the Welfare Party was banned from politics by the Constitutional Court of Turkey for violating the separation of religion and state. The ban was upheld by the European Court of Human Rights (ECtHR) on 13 February 2003. The ECtHR's decision was criticized by Human Rights Watch for lack of consistency, as the ECtHR had refused disbanding of other parties on several occasions, but the ECtHR defended its decision.

Turkey's incumbent president, Recep Tayyip Erdoğan, is a former member of the party. After being banned from politics for a period, he left this Islamist group and founded the Justice and Development Party (AKP). Abdullah Gül, the former President of Turkey, was the deputy leader of the Welfare Party until its dissolution.

== Dissolution ==
The Welfare Party came into the political sphere at a time when the impoverished public was discontented with the current government. Relying on Islamic rhetoric, they encouraged certain aspects of sharia law. Turkey, as a secular state, took issue with their religious narrative. Article 2.1 of the Turkish Constitution states that Turkey is a “democratic, secular, and social state.” Refah’s theocentric policy and speeches violated this commitment to secularism. On January 16, 1998, the Constitutional Court dissolved the Welfare Party because it had become a “center of activities against the principle of secularism.”

The Welfare Party then appealed to the European Court of Human Rights (ECtHR), stating that the Turkish Supreme Court violated Article 11 of the European Convention of Human Rights that protects assembly and association. Refah also complained that its rights protected in Articles 9, 10, 14, 17, and 18 of the Convention and Articles 1 and 3 of Protocol No. 1 had been violated.

Paragraph 2 of Article 11 states that if free speech rights are limited, and both parties agreed that they had been, it must be “necessary in a democratic society.” The court found that Article 9, which protects freedom of religion, did not protect the Welfare Party from the fact that their policies went directly against the Turkish Constitution. They explained that a political party may campaign for a change in the constitution under two regulations: the campaigning must be done in a democratic and legal manner, and that the change itself must protect fundamental democratic principles. The court concluded that the Welfare Party’s political agenda did not uphold these two standards. The Welfare Party’s religious roots were considered to be detrimental to the protection of democracy.

The Welfare Party’s ban was the first in a number of party bans in Turkey due to religious circumstances. Turkey’s commitment to progress, unity, and democracy in its early years meant that they often dismantled organizations that threatened any of these three pillars. Therefore, any separatist or generally revolutionary party threatened Turkish politics and was banned in the Constitutional Court and was deemed an illegal party. Turkey’s current Prime Minister Recep Tayyip Erdoğan was originally a member of the Welfare Party, and he used his status as a Islamist leader to garner support for his current party, the Justice and Development Party. The string of party bans made way for the Justice and Development Party to gain religious and political control.

== Lost Trillion Case ==
After the closure of the party, the Treasury demanded the return of grants worth around one trillion lira, i.e. one million lira in today's currency (around €99,796). Party officials stated that the funds were spent on party activities. However, an investigation revealed that the official documents were forged.

In the beginning of 1999, Necmettin Erbakan and 78 party officials stood trial in Ankara for embezzlement charges. The case became known as the "Lost Trillion Case" or the "Missing Trillion Case" (Turkish: Kayıp Trilyon Davası). In March 2002, the court sentenced Erbakan to two years and four months in prison. 68 party officials received sentences of up to one year and two months in prison. The sentences were approved by the Supreme Court of Appeals. The European Court of Human Rights upheld the ban as well.

== Foreign policy ==
=== Algerian Civil War ===
In the 1990s, both Algeria and Turkey had similar tensions between Islamists and a secular military. The Algerian military's intervention led to the repression of FIS and the subsequent Algerian Civil War in 1992, and the Turkish military forced the resignation of the Erbakan government and banned the Welfare Party. Referring to the Civil War, Necmettin Erbakan said "Turkey will not turn into Algeria" in 1992 and in 1997. However, on 10 May 1997, Welfare Party Şanlıurfa MP İbrahim Halil Çelik threatened that "If you try to close the İmam Hatip schools under the RP government, blood will be spilled. It would be worse than Algeria." Erbakan and his associates developed ties with FIS, and when Erbakan visited the American Muslim Council in October 1994, he engaged with FIS representatives.

== Election results ==
=== Grand National Assembly ===
Election date	Party leader	Votes	% of votes	Seats	Government
1987	Necmettin Erbakan	1,717,425	7.20%	0 / 450	ANAP
1991	Necmettin Erbakan	4,121,355	16.87%	62 / 450	DYP-SHP
1991	Necmettin Erbakan	4,121,355	16.87%	62 / 450	DYP minority
1995	Necmettin Erbakan	6,012,450	21.38%	158 / 550	DYP-CHP
1995	Necmettin Erbakan	6,012,450	21.38%	158 / 550	DYP-ANAP
1995	Necmettin Erbakan	6,012,450	21.38%	158 / 550	RP-DYP
1995	Necmettin Erbakan	6,012,450	21.38%	158 / 550	ANAP-DSP-DTP
1995	Necmettin Erbakan	6,012,450	21.38%	158 / 550	DSP minority

=== Local elections ===
Election date	Party leader	Provincial council		Number of municipalities
Election date	Party leader	Votes	%	Number of municipalities
1984	Ahmet Tekdal	780.342	4.40%	16 / 1,700
1989	Necmettin Erbakan	2.170.431	9.80%	74 / 1,984
1994	Necmettin Erbakan	5.388.195	19.14%	329 / 2,695

== See also ==
- List of Islamic political parties
- New Welfare Party
