= True Path Party =

True Path Party Doğru Yol Partisi
- Leader: Ahmet Nusret Tuna (1983); Yıldırım Avcı (1983–1985); Hüsamettin Cindoruk (1985–1987); Süleyman Demirel (1987–1993); Tansu Çiller (1993–2002); Mehmet Ağar (2002–2007)
- Founded: 23 June 1983
- Dissolved: 27 May 2007
- Preceded by: Justice Party; Great Turkey Party
- Succeeded by: Democrat Party
- Headquarters: Ankara, Turkey
- Ideology: Kemalism; Turkish nationalism; Liberal conservatism; Right-wing populism; Pro-Europeanism; Neoliberalism; Faction: Social liberalism
- Political position: Centre-right
- Colours: Red (official); Purple (customary)

The True Path Party (Turkish: Doğru Yol Partisi, DYP) was a centre-right political party in Turkey, active from 1983 to 2007. For most of its history, the party's central figure was Süleyman Demirel, a former Prime Minister of Turkey who previously led the Justice Party (AP) before it was shut down in the aftermath of the 1980 military coup. The DYP was widely considered the successor of both the AP and the Democrat Party (DP), active in Turkey's early multi-party period.

== History ==
The party was established in 1983 and it claimed that it was the exclusive successor of the Justice Party, which at the time also claimed to be a successor of Adnan Menderes' Democrat Party. The DYP was the main opposition party in the Grand National Assembly from 1987 to 1991. The party strongly relied on the voter basis of the DP and the AP, and announced in 1988, that 70% of the local party heads of the DYP, were former AP members. Later, the party won power in the 1991 general election, after having emerged as the largest party. Demirel subsequently returned to the premiership in the period from 1991 to 1993, before securing the Presidency of Turkey that year. Subsequently, both the DYP leadership and the premiership passed to Tansu Çiller, another prominent member of the party. Çiller was the first female prime minister of Turkey, and served until 1996. After then serving as a junior partner in several coalition governments, the party was wiped out of parliament in the 2002 general election, failing to pass the 10% electoral threshold required to win seats.

While the party proved able to maintain a presence in local politics after its 2002 ouster from parliament, the DYP appeared likely to again fail to enter parliament in the 2007 election. In response, the leadership of the DYP and that of the conservative Motherland Party (ANAP) announced their intention to merge under the name of the former Democratic Party (DP). Ultimately, the ANAP pulled out of the merger, though the True Path Party went through with the rebranding, and transformed into the new Democratic Party (DP) in May 2007. The new DP only polled 6% in the election, and remained out of the Grand National Assembly until 2018, when it received one seat on the Good Party list.

== Successor party ==
DYP rebranded itself to the Democratic Party in its 2007 Congress; however, Çetin Özaçıkgöz reestablished the DYP. It received 0.15% of the votes in the 2011 elections.

== Election results ==
Grand National Assembly of Turkey
Election	Votes			Seats		Role
Election	#	%	Rank	#	±	Role
1987	4,587,062	19.1	3rd	59 / 450	new	Opposition
1991	6,600,726	27.0	1st	178 / 450	▲119	Coalition government
1995	5,396,009	19.2	3rd	135 / 550	▼43	Coalition government
1999	3,745,417	12.0	5th	85 / 550	▼50	Opposition
2002	2,997,065	9.5	3rd	0 / 550	▼85	Extra-parliamentary opposition

== Prominent members ==
=== Party leaders ===
- Ahmet Nusret Tuna (1983)
- Yıldırım Avcı (1983–1985)
- Hüsamettin Cindoruk (1985–1987)
- Süleyman Demirel (1987–1993)
- Tansu Çiller (1993–2002)
- Mehmet Ağar (2002–2007)

=== Prime Ministers of Turkey ===
- Süleyman Demirel (1991–1993)
- Tansu Çiller (1993–1996)

=== Presidents of Turkey ===
- Süleyman Demirel (1993–2000)
