= 2004 Istanbul mayoral election =

Turkish municipal election

← 1999	28 March 2004	2009 →
- Registered: 6,440,606
- Turnout: 4,400,637 (68.33%)
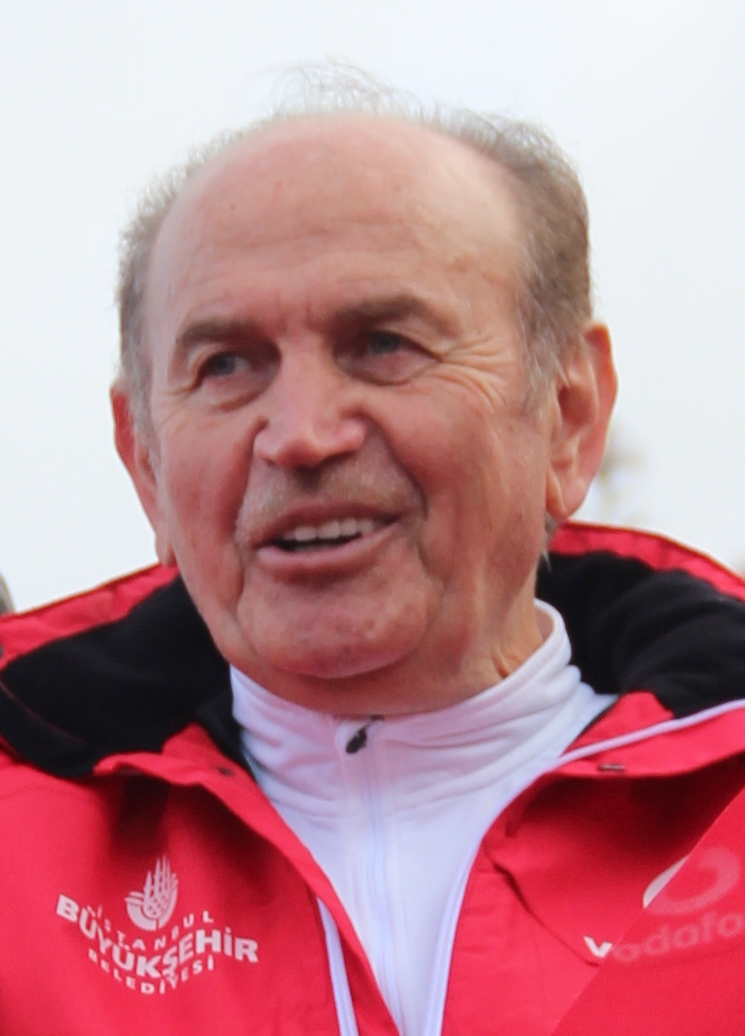
	First party	Second party
Candidate	Kadir Topbaş	Mehmet Sefa Sirmen
Party	AKP	CHP
Popular vote	1,917,577	1,223,856
Percentage	45.3%	28.9%
- Districts won by each candidate Kadir Topbaş (22) Mehmet Sefa Sirmen (5)
Mayor before election
Ali Müfit Gürtuna
Independent
Elected mayor
Kadir Topbaş
AKP

The election of Istanbul Metropolitan Municipality was held on 28 March 2004, alongside all local body elections (officially known as the 28 March 2004 Local Administrations General Elections) of Turkey. In the election, Recep Tayyip Erdogan's new AK Party won the election. AK Party's mayoral candidate Kadir Topbas became the mayor of Istanbul Metropolitan Municipality.

== Results ==
Party	Candidate	Popular Votes	Percentage
AKP	Kadir Topbas	1,917,577	45.3%
CHP	Mehmet Sefa Sirmen	1,223,856	28.9%
SP	Mukadder Baseğmez	228,615	5.4%
DYP	Ahmet Vefik Alp	206,410	4.9%
MHP	Meral Aksener	173,274	4.1%
SHP	Mustafa Kul	153,840	3.6%
GP	Horizon Ilkiz	145,120	3.4%
Others	—	177,108	4.3%
Independents	—	5,687	0.1%
Total		4,231,487	100%
Valid Votes		4,231,487	96.16%
Invalid/Blank Votes		169,150	3.84%
Total Votes		4,400,637	100%
Registered Voters/Turn Out		6,440,606	68.33%

== Results by District ==
District	Kadir Topbas (AKP)		Mehmet Sefa Sirmen (CHP)		Others		Valid votes		Voter turnout		Registered electors
District	# of votes	%	# of votes	%	# of votes	%	# of votes	%	# of votes	%	Registered electors
Adalar	2,547	25.47	4,620	46.2	2,834	28.33	10,001	96.53	10,360	74.5	13,905
Avcılar	42,522	38.48	42,478	38.43	25,518	23.09	110,518	96.26	114,816	65.96	174,081
Bağcılar	120,648	50.83	40,183	16.93	76,545	32.24	237,376	95.08	249,639	66.6	374,872
Bahçelievler	100,523	48.28	57,214	27.49	50,454	24.23	208,191	96.86	214,962	61.9	347,302
Bakırköy	29,067	26.37	53,436	48.48	27,742	25.15	110,245	97.69	122,109	66.66	169,314
Bayrampaşa	61,797	52.56	18,621	15.84	37,165	31.6	117,583	96.3	122,109	72.46	168,542
Beşiktaş	23,423	23.48	53,040	53.17	23,308	23.35	99,771	97.3	102,531	62.53	163,968
Beykoz	41,863	47.06	23,532	26.46	23,553	26.48	88,948	95.2	93,440	73.34	127,398
Beyoğlu	47,140	43.28	29,383	26.98	32,419	29.76	108,942	95.42	114,166	66.15	172,589
Eminönü	6,717	35.63	3,713	19.7	8,420	44.67	18,850	95.42	19,753	59.7	33,091
Esenler	90,704	52.71	25,339	14.72	56,032	32.57	172,075	95.22	180,701	70.32	256,973
Eyüp	53,768	45.1	32,936	27.63	32,494	27.26	119,198	95.66	124,616	75.73	164,547
Fatih	94,181	48.71	42,737	22.1	56,432	29.18	193,350	96.13	201,126	64.63	311,169
Gaziosmanpaşa	158,518	53.02	63,186	21.14	77,241	25.84	298,945	96.12	310,996	71.58	434,523
Güngören											
Kadıköy											
Kağıthane											
Kartal											
Küçükçekmece											
Maltepe											
Pendik											
Sarıyer											
Şişli											
Tuzla											
Ümraniye											
Üsküdar											
Zeytinburnu											
Istanbul											
