= 1999 Istanbul mayoral election =

Turkish municipal election

| ← 1994 | 18 April 1999 | 2004 → |
- Registered: 5,521,300
- Turnout: 4,573,976 (82.8%)
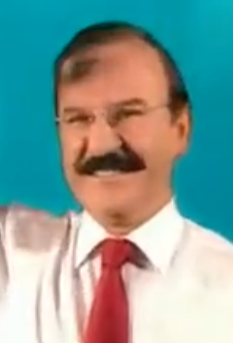

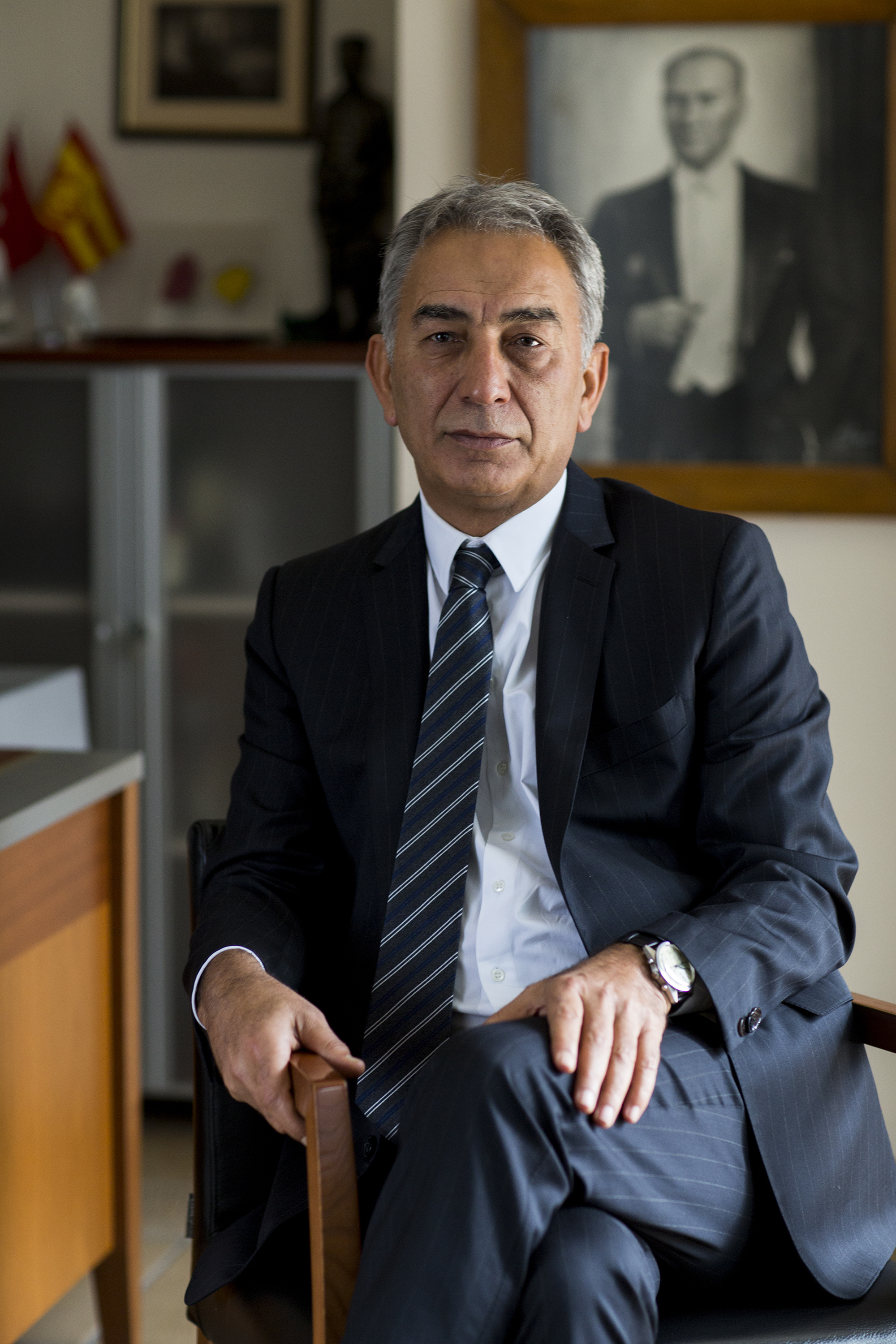
| | First party | Second party | Third party |
|---|---|---|---|
| Candidate | Ali Müfit Gürtuna | Ali Talip Özdemir | Zekeriya Temizel |
| Party | FP | ANAP | DSP |
| Popular vote | 1,202,050 | 977,920 | 882,923 |
| Percentage | 27.5% | 22.4% | 20.2% |
| | Fourth party |
| Candidate | Adnan Polat |
| Party | CHP |
| Popular vote | 607,895 |
| Percentage | 13.9% |
Mayor before election
Ali Müfit Gürtuna
FP
Elected mayor
Ali Müfit Gürtuna
FP

The 1999 Istanbul Metropolitan Municipality election was held on 18 April 1999 to elect a mayor for the metropolitan municipality and districts mayor of Istanbul Province.In the election, Incumbent Ali Müfit Gürtuna of FP won the election.
