= Mayor of Istanbul =

- İstanbul Büyükşehir Belediye Başkanı
- Incumbent; Nuri Aslan; Acting since 26 March 2025
- Istanbul Metropolitan Municipality
- Style: None, de facto full (given and family) name.
- Term length: Five years, renewable indefinitely
- Inaugural holder: Pepe Salih Paşa (Ottoman Empire); Haydar Yuluğ (Republic of Turkey)
- Formation: 13 July 1855; 11 July 1958; 26 March 1984 (As Metropolitan Municipality)
- Website: ibb.istanbul

The mayor of Istanbul is the head of the Istanbul Metropolitan Municipality. The mayor is elected popularly every five years. Nuri Aslan has served as interim mayor of Istanbul since 26 March 2025.

This article covers the Ottoman Empire to the modern day Republic of Turkey, during the Ottoman period and in the Republican era until c. 1930.

== Ottoman Empire ==
=== During 1453–1858 ===
In the Ottoman Empire, the duty of municipal government was the responsibility of the "Şehremini", a mayor-like leader, and local religious judges, "Kadı".

The first mayor of Istanbul after the conquest on May 29, 1453 was Hızırbey Çelebi. Until 1858, the capital of the Ottoman Empire was governed by a total of 422 kadis.

=== Tanzimat period (1858–1876) ===
The idea to establish a municipality organization based on Western standards was first discussed in 1854 during the Crimean War when diplomats and journalists of allied nations came to Constantinople. Later, the parliament accepted a law for the establishment of the office of a mayor and a city council.

Salih Paşa received the first title of the new, modern Şehremini on July 13, 1858, and governed until November 4, 1858. During the Tanzimat period, 18 mayors took office.

==== First constitutional monarchy (1876–1908) ====
In 1876, as First constitutional monarchy was proclaimed, Kadri Paşa was the mayor of Istanbul. During this period 10 mayors governed Istanbul.

==== Second constitutional monarchy (1908–1923) ====
During the reign of Young Turks, between 1908–1918 and until the foundation of the republic, 23 mayors served in the capital.

== Republic of Turkey ==
No.	Portrait	Name (Birth–Death)	Term of office			Political party	Notes
No.	Portrait	Name (Birth–Death)	Took office	Left office	Time in office	Political party	Notes
Governors as mayors (1923–1960)
1		Haydar Yuluğ (1878–1937)	15 April 1923	8 June 1924	1 year, 54 days	CHP	After the proclamation of the republic on October 29, 1923, the governor of the city was charged with the duties as deputy mayor.
2		Emin Erkul (1881–1964)	8 June 1924	12 October 1928	4 years, 126 days	CHP	
3		Mühittin Üstündağ (1884–1953)	14 October 1928	4 December 1938	10 years, 53 days	CHP	With the municipality act of April 3, 1930, the title of mayor was abandoned and the governor of Istanbul province took over the duties of the mayor. The two separate councils of the province and the municipality were unified.
4		Lütfi Kırdar (1889–1961)	8 December 1938	16 October 1949	10 years, 312 days	CHP	
5		Fahrettin Kerim Gökay (1900–1987)	24 October 1949	26 October 1957	8 years, 2 days	Independent	The two councils were reestablished on March 1, 1957
–		Kemal Hadımlı (1908–19??)	12 July 1957	5 October 1957	85 days	DP	Deputy Governor of Istanbul, appointed as acting mayor.
6		Mümtaz Tarhan (1908–1970)	29 November 1957	11 May 1958	163 days	DP	
7		Ethem Yetkiner (1912–1973)	14 May 1958	24 December 1958	224 days	DP	
8		Kemal Aygün (1914–1979)	25 December 1958	27 May 1960	1 year, 154 days	DP	
Mayors during the military rule (1960–1963)
9		Refik Tulga (1907–1981)	27 May 1960	14 June 1960	18 days	Military	
10		Şefik Erensü (1912–1989)	14 June 1960	24 September 1960	102 days	Military	
(9)		Refik Tulga (1907–1981)	24 September 1960	26 February 1962	1 year, 155 days	Military	
11		Turan Ertuğ	27 February 1962	16 March 1962	17 days	Military	(Deputy)
12		Kamuran Görgün	18 March 1962	30 January 1963	318 days	Military	
–		Kadri İlkay	30 January 1963	31 January 1963	1 day	Military	(Deputy)
–		Niyazi Akı (1913–1992)	31 January 1963	28 February 1963	28 days	Military	(Deputy)
13		Necdet Uğur (1923–2004)	28 February 1963	9 December 1963	284 days	Military	
Elected mayors of Istanbul Municipality (1963–1980)
14		Haşim İşcan (1898–1968)	10 December 1963	11 March 1968	4 years, 92 days	CHP	The municipality act of July 27, 1963, enabled the election of the mayor. The polls held on November 17, 1963, were the first regional elections to elect the mayor.
–		Faruk Ilgaz (1922–2014)	12 March 1968	6 June 1968	86 days	AP	(Deputy)
15		Fahri Atabey (1913–1994)	8 June 1968	9 December 1973	5 years, 184 days	AP	
16		Ahmet İsvan (1923–2017)	14 December 1973	11 December 1977	3 years, 362 days	CHP	
17		Aytekin Kotil (1934–1992)	14 December 1977	12 September 1980	2 years, 273 days	CHP	
Mayors during the military rule (1980–1984)
18		İsmail Hakki Akansel (1924–2016)	12 September 1980	30 August 1981	352 days	Military	
19		Ecmel Kutay (1927–1998)	30 August 1981	24 March 1982	206 days	Military	
20		Abdullah Tırtıl (1923–1996)	24 March 1982	26 March 1984	2 years, 2 days	Military	
Elected mayors of Istanbul Municipality (1984–present)
21		Bedrettin Dalan (born 1941)	26 March 1984	28 March 1989	5 years, 2 days	ANAP	On March 8, 1984, the metropolitan municipality act was put into force and on March 23 the municipality of Greater Istanbul was established.
22		Nurettin Sözen (born 1937)	28 March 1989	27 March 1994	4 years, 364 days	SHP	
23		Recep Tayyip Erdoğan (born 1954)	27 March 1994	6 November 1998	4 years, 224 days	RP/FP	Elected in the 1994 election. Sacked after being sentenced to 10 months in jail.
24		Ali Müfit Gürtuna (born 1952)	12 November 1998	28 March 2004	5 years, 137 days	FP (until 2001)	Elected by the city council.
24		Ali Müfit Gürtuna (born 1952)	12 November 1998	28 March 2004	5 years, 137 days	Independent (from 2001)	Elected by the city council.
25		Kadir Topbaş (1945–2021)	28 March 2004	22 September 2017	13 years, 179 days	AKP	Re-elected twice (in 2009 and 2014). Resigned at the request of AKP and incumbent President Recep Tayyip Erdoğan.
26		Mevlüt Uysal (born 1966)	22 September 2017	17 April 2019	1 year, 207 days	AKP	Elected by the city council.
27		Ekrem İmamoğlu (born 1970)	17 April 2019	6 May 2019	19 days	CHP	Elected in the March 2019 election. Election annulled by the Supreme Electoral Council (YSK) on 6 May 2019.
–		Ali Yerlikaya (born 1968); Acting	7 May 2019	27 June 2019	51 days	Independent	Governor of Istanbul, appointed as acting mayor.
(27)		Ekrem İmamoğlu (born 1970)	27 June 2019	23 March 2025	7 years, 72 days	CHP	Re-elected in the June 2019 re-run election and 2024 Turkish local elections.
–		Nuri Aslan (born 1969); Acting	26 March 2025	Incumbent	1 year, 165 days	CHP	Elected by the city council to serve as acting mayor.

== See also ==
- List of mayors of Ankara
