= 1994 Istanbul mayoral election =

Turkish municipal election

- 27 March 1994
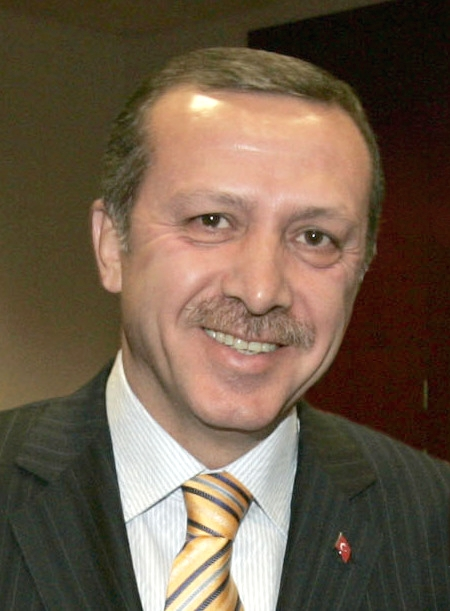

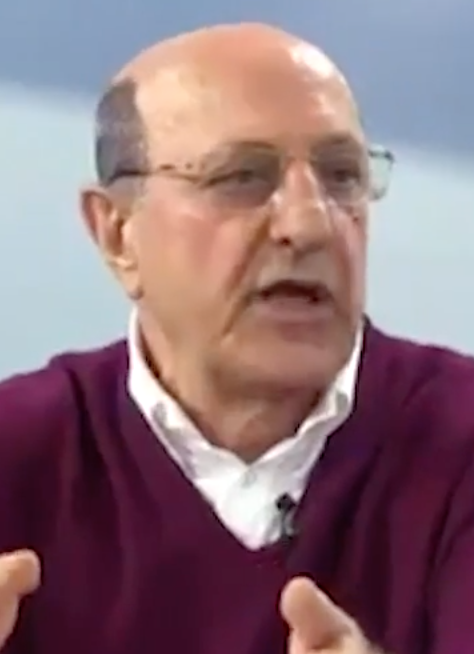

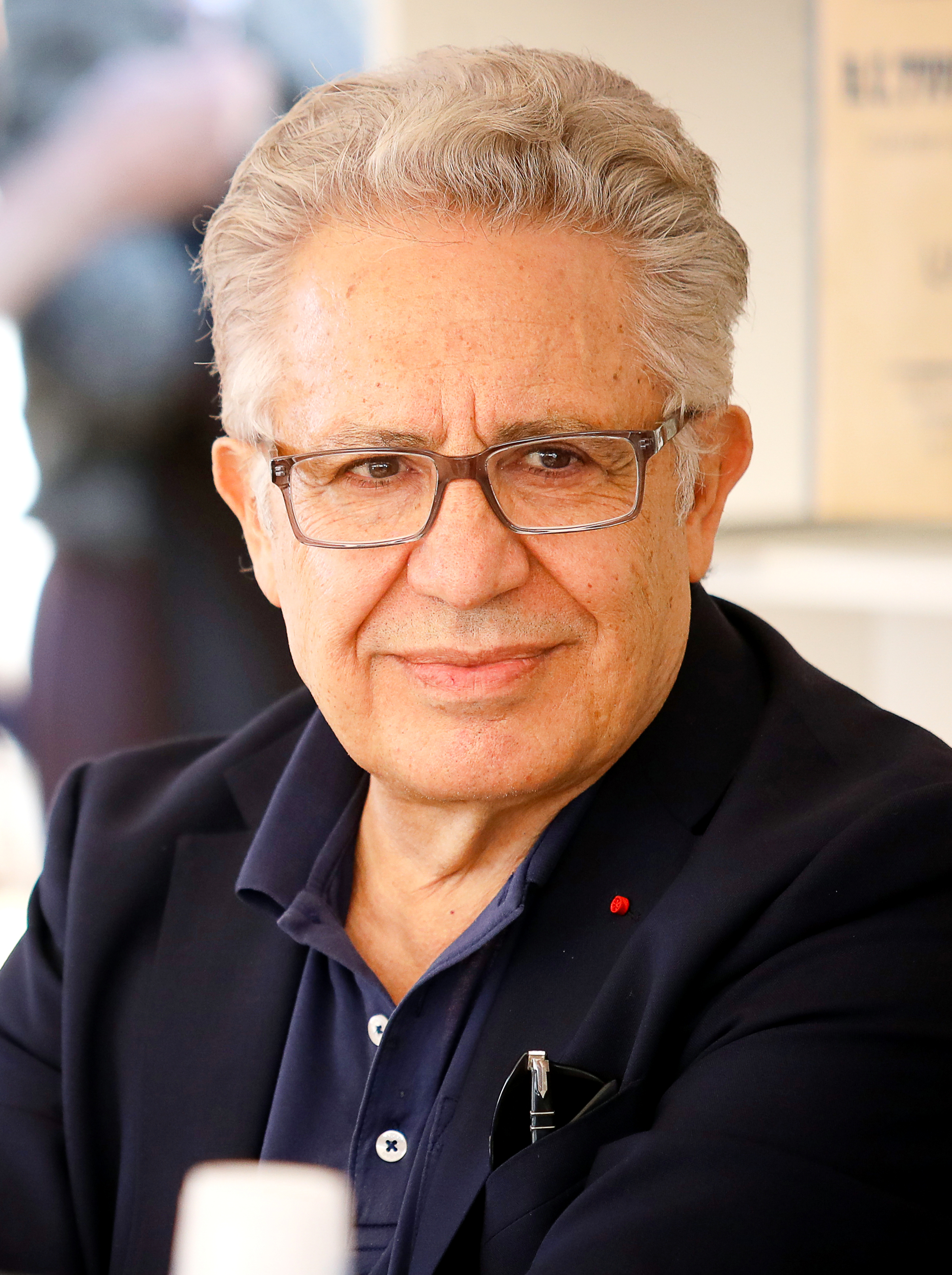
| Candidate | Recep Tayyip Erdoğan | İlhan Kesici | Zülfü Livaneli |
| Party | RP | ANAP | SHP |
| Popular vote | 973,704 | 855,897 | 784,693 |
| Percentage | 25.19% | 22.14% | 20.30% |
| Candidate | Bedrettin Dalan | Necdet Özkan |
| Party | DYP | DSP |
| Popular vote | 597,461 | 478,612 |
| Percentage | 15.46% | 12.38% |
Mayor before election
Nurettin Sözen
SHP
Elected Mayor
Recep Tayyip Erdoğan
RP

The 1994 Istanbul mayoral election took place on 27 March 1994 in order to elect the Mayor of the Istanbul Metropolitan Municipality. Additionally, each of the 27 districts of Istanbul elected a district municipal mayor on the same day. The election was held as part of nationwide local elections held on the same day.

The winner of the metropolitan mayoral race was Recep Tayyip Erdoğan, the candidate of the Islamist-oriented Welfare Party, who served until his imprisonment in 1998. Erdoğan later went on to become Prime Minister of Turkey in 2003 and President of Turkey in 2014.

== Results ==
The full results of the election are shown in the table below.

| Candidate | Party | Votes | Percentage (%) |
|---|---|---|---|
| Recep Tayyip Erdoğan | RP | 973,704 | 25.19 |
| İlhan Kesici | ANAP | 855,897 | 22.14 |
| Zülfü Livaneli | SHP | 784,693 | 20.30 |
| Bedrettin Dalan | DYP | 597,461 | 15.46 |
| Necdet Özkan | DSP | 478,612 | 12.38 |
| Ahmet Vefik Alp | MHP | 72,121 | 1.87 |
| Ertuğrul Günay | CHP | 54,028 | 1.40 |
| Ahmet Hamdi Turgut | BBP | 13,662 | 0.35 |
| Ferit Edibali | MP | 12,294 | 0.32 |
| Hasan Celal Güzel | HDP | 7,979 | 0.21 |
| Arslan Başer Kafaoğlu | SBP | 7,075 | 0.18 |
| Arslan Kılıç | İP | 5,215 | 0.13 |
| | Independents | 2,385 | 0.06 |
| Total | | 3,865,126 | 100.00 |

=== By district ===
Results of the 1994 Istanbul mayoral election by district
| District | Recep Tayyip Erdoğan RP | | İlhan Kesici ANAP | | Zülfü Livaneli SHP | | Bedrettin Dalan DYP | | Necdet Özkan DSP | | Other candidates | | Total |
| District | # | % | # | % | # | % | # | % | # | % | # | % | Total |
|---|---|---|---|---|---|---|---|---|---|---|---|---|---|
| Adalar | 735 | 6.7% | 4,484 | 40.9% | 2,541 | 23.2% | 2,589 | 23.6% | 265 | 2.5% | 344 | 3.1% | 10,958 |
| Avcılar | 13,501 | 16.0% | 24,885 | 29.5% | 21,763 | 25.8% | 12,626 | 15.0% | 8,015 | 9.5% | 3,572 | 4.2% | 84,362 |
| Bağcılar | 62,911 | 35.5% | 27,865 | 15.7% | 29,619 | 16.7% | 13,211 | 7.5% | 33,794 | 19.1% | 9,771 | 5.5% | 177,171 |
| Bahçelievler | 51,783 | 25.4% | 47,657 | 23.3% | 47.654 | 23.3% | 29,604 | 14.5% | 18,833 | 9.2% | 8,628 | 4.2% | 204,159 |
| Bakırköy | 9,738 | 7.7% | 41,587 | 32.7% | 31,386 | 24.6% | 31,351 | 24.8% | 9,203 | 7.2% | 4,015 | 3.2% | 127,280 |
| Bayrampaşa | 35,457 | 28.9% | 24,689 | 20.1% | 13,734 | 11.2% | 24,393 | 19.9% | 18,685 | 15.2% | 5,792 | 4.7% | 122,750 |
| Beşiktaş | 11,533 | 9.3% | 35,829 | 28.8% | 33,608 | 27.1% | 28,949 | 23.3% | 10,404 | 8.4% | 3,829 | 3.1% | 124,152 |
| Beykoz | 23,898 | 29.4% | 20,732 | 25.5% | 11,001 | 13.6% | 10,299 | 12.7% | 11,559 | 14.2% | 3,668 | 4.5% | 81,157 |
| Beyoğlu | 37,735 | 31.0% | 22,321 | 18.3% | 23,312 | 19.2% | 18,712 | 15.4% | 13,977 | 11.5% | 5,664 | 4.7% | 121,721 |
| Eminönü | 8,001 | 27.3% | 6,817 | 23.3% | 5,779 | 19.7% | 3,386 | 11.5% | 2,525 | 8.6% | 2,815 | 9.6% | 29,323 |
| Esenler | 43,271 | 36.0% | 21,749 | 18.1% | 16,450 | 13.7% | 12,314 | 10.3% | 20,344 | 16.9% | 5,976 | 5.0% | 120,104 |
| Eyüpsultan | 30,285 | 25.9% | 23,777 | 20.3% | 21,526 | 18.4% | 18,489 | 15.8% | 17,987 | 15.4% | 4,806 | 4.1% | 116,870 |
| Fatih | 69,448 | 28.0% | 57,109 | 23.0% | 36,342 | 14.6% | 47,688 | 19.2% | 27,556 | 11.1% | 10,192 | 4.1% | 248,335 |
| Gaziosmanpaşa | 74,870 | 33.6% | 41.455 | 18.6% | 30,093 | 13.5% | 32,087 | 14.4% | 34,310 | 15.4% | 10,128 | 4.5% | 222,943 |
| Güngören | 32,692 | 25.9% | 31,050 | 24.6% | 24,007 | 19.0% | 17,721 | 14.1% | 14,056 | 11.1% | 6,583 | 5.2% | 126,109 |
| Kadıköy | 61,699 | 15.0% | 103,824 | 25.3% | 112,572 | 27.5% | 89,885 | 21.9% | 28,489 | 7.0% | 13,444 | 3.3% | 409,913 |
| Kağıthane | 50,460 | 33.8% | 31,705 | 21.3% | 28,082 | 18.8% | 14,534 | 9.7% | 18,475 | 12.4 | 6,001 | 4.0% | 149,257 |
| Kartal | 40,023 | 28.2% | 30,524 | 21.5% | 36,914 | 26.0% | 15,111 | 10.6% | 13,461 | 9.5 | 6,040 | 4.3% | 142,073 |
| Küçükçekmece | 38,871 | 19.4% | 35,775 | 17.9% | 32,288 | 16.2% | 30,911 | 15.5% | 52,035 | 26.0% | 10,017 | 5.0% | 199,897 |
| Maltepe | 32,345 | 20.5% | 39,332 | 24.9% | 43,135 | 27.4% | 23,986 | 15.2% | 12,042 | 7.6% | 6,919 | 4.4% | 157,759 |
| Pendik | 42,246 | 31.6% | 23,857 | 17.8% | 24,921 | 18.6% | 14,938 | 11.2% | 17,963 | 13.4% | 9,851 | 7.4% | 133,776 |
| Sarıyer | 23,660 | 24.0% | 22,131 | 22.5% | 23,418 | 23.8% | 11,005 | 11.2% | 14,158 | 14.4% | 4,126 | 4.2% | 98,498 |
| Şişli | 20,955 | 14.6% | 34,851 | 24.3% | 34,069 | 23.7% | 26,967 | 18.8% | 21,411 | 14.9% | 5,235 | 3.6% | 143,488 |
| Tuzla | 9,503 | 28.2% | 6,844 | 20.3% | 7,467 | 22.1% | 4,470 | 13.3% | 3,660 | 10.9% | 1,787 | 5.3% | 33,731 |
| Ümraniye | 55,890 | 38.7% | 20,358 | 14.1% | 33,243 | 23.0% | 13,216 | 9.1% | 12,200 | 8.4% | 9,651 | 6.7% | 144,558 |
| Üsküdar | 68,466 | 28.9% | 53,614 | 22.6% | 45,064 | 19.0% | 35,539 | 15.0% | 22,363 | 9.4% | 12,098 | 5.1% | 237,144 |
| Zeytinburnu | 23,728 | 24.3% | 21,076 | 21.6% | 14,705 | 15.1% | 13,300 | 13.6% | 20,837 | 21.3% | 3,992 | 4.1% | 97,638 |
| Total | 973,704 | 25.19% | 855,897 | 22.14% | 784,693 | 20.30% | 597,461 | 15.46% | 478,612 | 12.38% | 174,759 | 4.52% | 3,865,126 |
