= Hakkı Akansel =

Turkish military general and politician

Mayor of Istanbul
- In office 12 September 1980 – 30 August 1981
- Preceded by: Aytekin Kotil
- Succeeded by: Ecmel Kutay

Personal details
- Born: 1924 Erzincan, Turkey
- Died: 15 May 2016 (aged 92)

İsmail Hakkı Akansel (1924 – 15 May 2016) was a Turkish military general and politician. In 1980, Akansel was appointed Mayor of Istanbul following the 1980 Turkish coup d'état and the establishment of military rule in Turkey. He served as the mayor of Istanbul from September 1980 to August 1981.

He commanded the War Academies, the Second Army and the Aegean Army. He retired from the military in 1985.

İsmail Hakki Akansel died in İzmir, Turkey on 15 May 2016 at the age of 92. He was buried in Istanbul.
