= Ahmet Güvener =

Turkish football administrator

Ahmet Güvener is a Turkish football administrator and former Secretary General of Turkish Football Federation (TFF) between the years 2009 and 2010. During his tenure as Secretary General he developed the first Strategic Plan of the TFF. He also held the positions of Chairman of the National Referee Committee between the years 1993 and 1995 and Director of Football Development between the years 2008 and 2009 for the TFF. He is the only European football professional that held all three positions.

== Early life and education ==
Ahmet was born on 12 September 1953 in Istanbul. After completing his primary education he graduated from the Robert College (High school) (the oldest American Educational Institution outside the USA), based in Istanbul. He later graduated from Boğaziçi University with a BS degree in Electrical Engineering and from the University of Wisconsin–Madison with a master's degree in Computer Sciences. Between 1987 and 2004 he worked in the IT industry as an executive.

In 2000, when he became a project coordinator for the Turkish Informatics Association, Güvener also started to teach discrete mathematics in Yeditepe University.

== Sports career ==
He was a member of FIFA Referee Instructors Panel (1994-2001) and UEFA Referee Convention Panel (2009-2011)

Since 2010, Ahmet has been working as a freelance consultant in Football. After an active sports career, he resumed being a sports columnist for Cumhuriyet. When he resettled in Austin, Texas, he worked briefly as a consultant for soccer management for Indy Eleven, a professional soccer team competing in the NASL. Güvener worked as a columnist for Soccer America, expressing his views and analyses regarding the politics of soccer. From 2017 to 2019, he worked with Laredo Heat as a soccer management consultant, consulting the club in the field of restructuring in order to become a development academy.

He is now a partner of The Game Planners LLC. The Game Planners is a consulting firm for the development of soccer organizations.

The leading youth academy in Turkey, Altinordu FK named one of its facilities after Güvener for his contribution to Academy Development Leagues.
