= 2009 Istanbul mayoral election =

Turkish municipal election

2009 İstanbul mayoral elections
← 2004	29 March 2009	2014 →
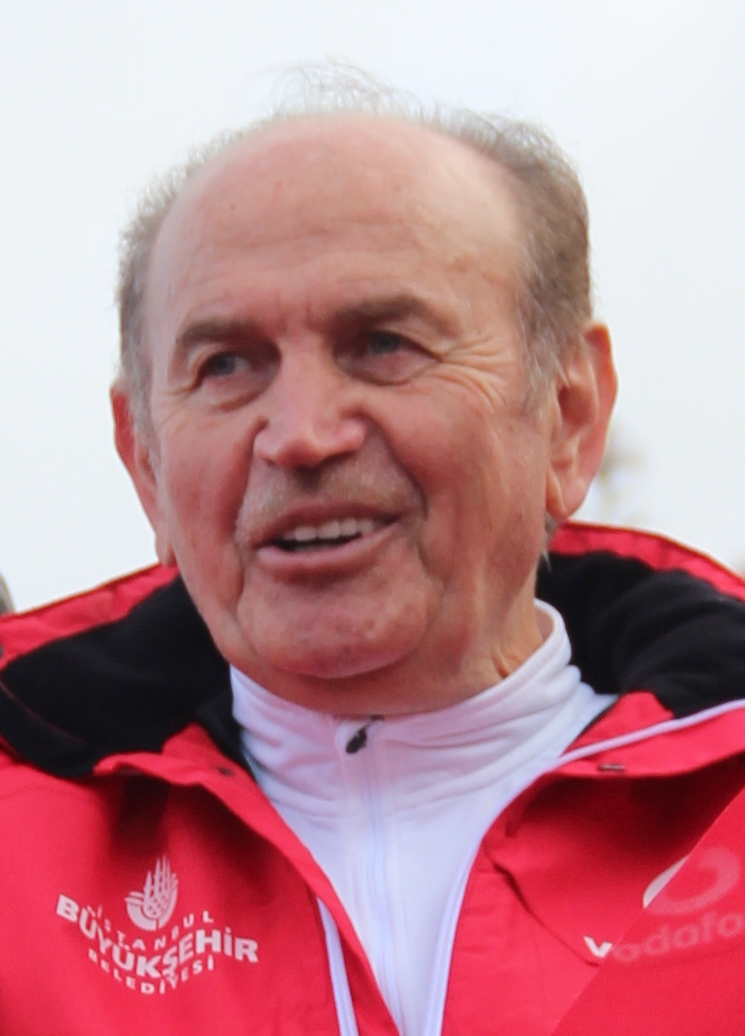

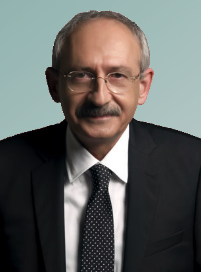
	First party	Second party
Candidate	Kadir Topbaş	Kemal Kılıçdaroğlu
Party	AK Party	CHP
Popular vote	3,105,555	2,568,710
Percentage	44.71%	36.98%
Swing	▼0.98%	▲7.88%
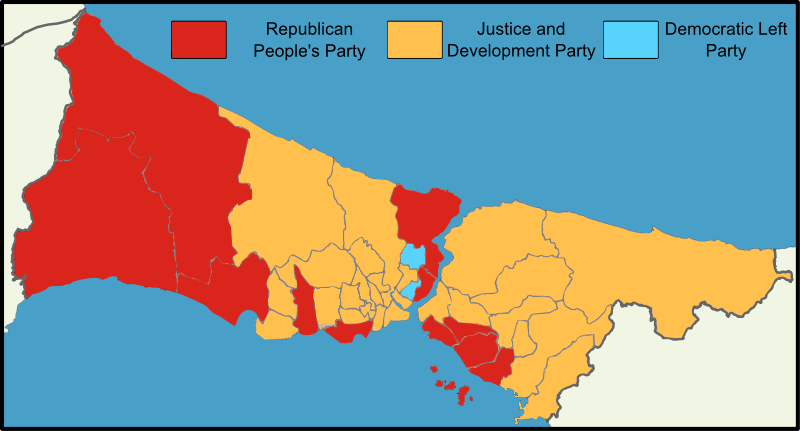
Mayor before election
Kadir Topbaş
AK Party
Elected mayor
Kadir Topbaş
AK Party

The 2009 Istanbul mayoral election for the office of mayor of the Istanbul Metropolitan Municipality (Turkish: İstanbul Büyükşehir Belediye Başkanlığı) was held on 29 March 2009 and was won by the Justice and Development Party candidate, the incumbent Kadir Topbaş.

The closely fought contest was noticeable in that it helped launch the national political career of Kemal Kılıçdaroğlu, who would go on to assume the leadership of his party.

== Results ==
Candidate	Party	Votes	%
Kadir Topbaş	Justice and Development Party	3,101,440	44.71
Kemal Kılıçdaroğlu	Republican People's Party	2,566,704	37.00
Ahmet Turgut	Nationalist Movement Party	347,449	5.01
Mehmet Bekaroğlu	Felicity Party	336,849	4.86
Akın Birdal	Democratic Society Party	312,074	4.50
Ahmet Vefik Alp	Democratic Left Party	90,223	1.30
Cevdet Tellioğlu	Great Unity Party	79,162	1.14
Mehmet Dülger	Democrat Party	33,052	0.48
Ahmet Özal	Motherland Party	21,908	0.32
Sabiha Karamustafa	Independent Turkey Party	17,018	0.25
Mehmet Ali Erdoğan	Rights and Freedoms Party	9,490	0.14
Zehra Güner	Communist Party of Turkey	7,688	0.11
Ahmet Aktaş	Nation Party	4,955	0.07
Fahrettin Tanınmış	Liberal Democratic Party	3,014	0.04
Melek Altıntaş	Independent	1,045	0.02
Nurullah Çolak	Independent	711	0.01
Selamettin Tellioğlu	Independent	540	0.01
Cihan Akdaş	Independent	503	0.01
Yahya Güneşer	Independent	448	0.01
Ahmet Lacin	Independent	447	0.01
Abidin Orhan Pak	Independent	420	0.01
Erhan Taş	Independent	332	0.00
Fatma Ragibe Kanıkuru Loğoğlu	Independent	282	0.00
Dursunali Bacıoğlu	Independent	276	0.00
Burhan Erol	Independent	275	0.00
Yasin Kılar	Independent	251	0.00
Total		6,936,556	100.00
Valid votes		6,936,556	96.49
Invalid/blank votes		252,253	3.51
Total votes		7,188,809	100.00
Registered voters/turnout		8,794,284	81.74
