= Mas-Kom-Yah =

Theater play by Recep Tayyip Erdoğan (1975)

- Original language: Turkish
- Written by: Recep Tayyip Erdoğan
- Based on: Kızıl Pençe ("Red Claw") by Mustafa Bayburtlu
- Subject: Antisemitic trope
- Genre: Drama

Premiere
- Date: 1975
- Directed by: Recep Tayyip Erdoğan

Mas-Kom-Yah is a theater play written by Recep Tayyip Erdoğan at the age of 21 in 1975, based on the book Kızıl Pençe ("Red Claw") written by the Islamist preacher Mustafa Bayburtlu. Erdoğan later became the future Mayor of Istanbul, Prime Minister and President of Turkey.

The name Mas-Kom-Yah is an abbreviation for Mason, Komünist ve Yahudi, for Freemason, Communist and Jew which were described in the play as dangers to Turkey.

== Plot ==
The non-religious factory owner Ayhan Bey sends his son abroad for education. Years later, the son, having renounced Islam, returns to Turkey. This leads to a falling out between Ayhan Bey and his son. At the same time, the factory owner's workers rebel and take over Ayhan Bey's property. They are incited by a Jewish worker posing as a Turkish Muslim. The ringleader, portrayed in the play as extremely malicious, ultimately incites his colleagues to murder Ayhan Bey.

== Performance ==
Erdoğan, who wrote the play, also participated in the production as director and actor, playing the role of the factory owner's son. The play was performed throughout Turkey from 1975 until the 1980 Turkish coup d'état.

== Criticism ==
In 2012, the German weekly news magazine Der Spiegel, described the play as an anti-Semitic piece and accused Erdoğan of understanding theatre from a propagandistic perspective and of hindering theatre work as Prime Minister, because theatres and stages in today's Republic of Turkey are partly liberal and secular bastions of society.
