= Kotil =

Kotil is a surname. Notable people with the surname include:

- Arlene Kotil (1934–2022), American baseball player
- Aytekin Kotil (1934–1992), Turkish politician
- Temel Kotil (born 1959), Turkish engineer and bureaucrat
