= 2014 Istanbul mayoral election =

Turkish municipal elections

- 30 March 2014
- Turnout: 89.44%
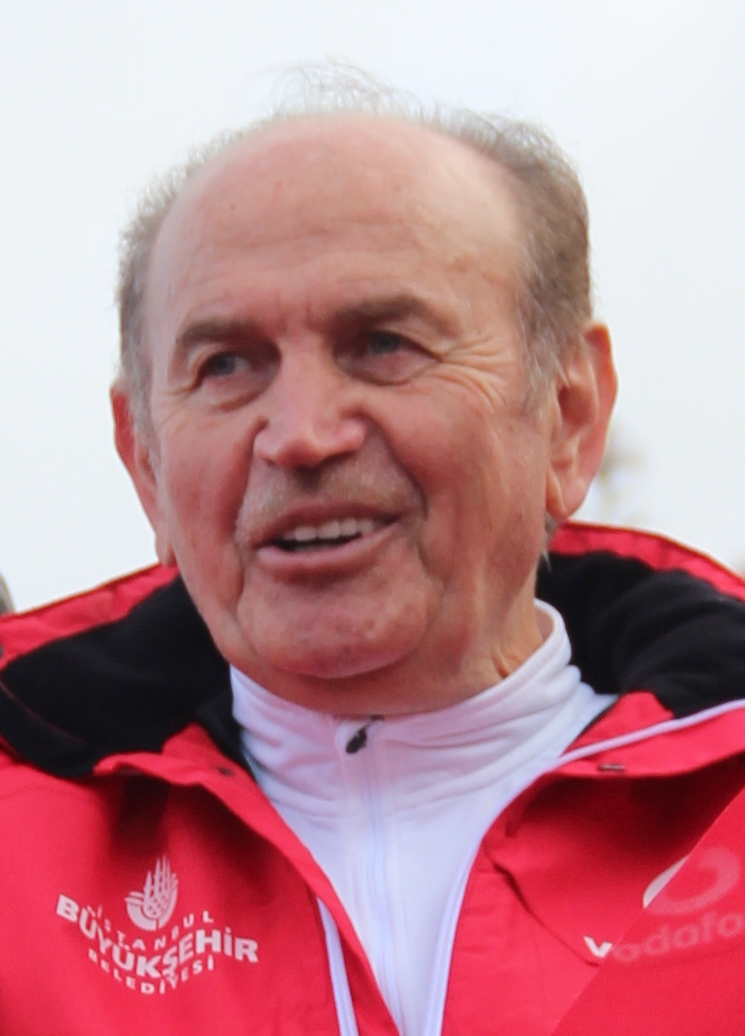

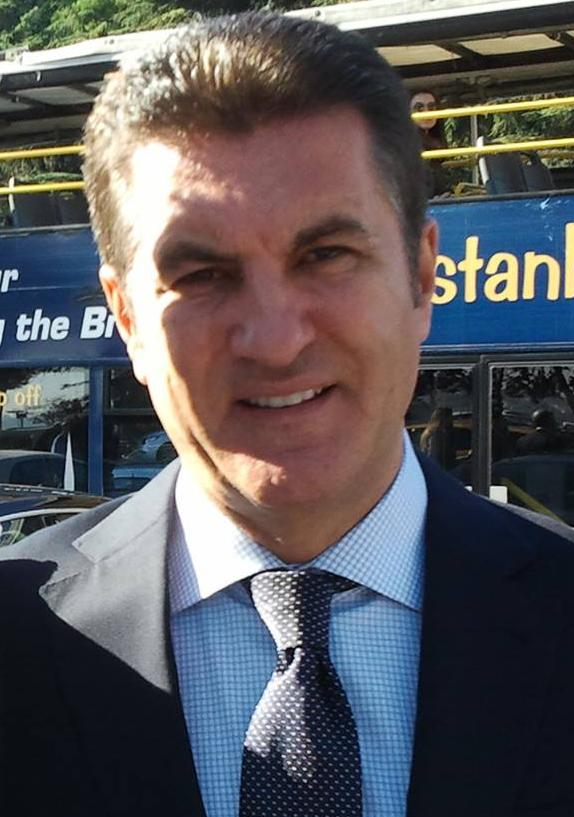
	First party	Second party
Candidate	Kadir Topbaş	Mustafa Sarıgül
Party	AK Party	CHP
Popular vote	4,100,906	3,428,454
Percentage	47.95%	40.08%
Swing	▲3.24%	▲3.10%
- Districts won by each candidate: Kadir Topbaş (24) Mustafa Sarıgül (15)
Mayor before election
Kadir Topbaş
AK Party
Elected Mayor
Kadir Topbaş
AK Party

The Istanbul mayoral elections of 2014 were held on 30 March 2014, as part of the local elections taking place throughout Turkey on the same day. The Metropolitan Mayor of Istanbul as well as the district mayors of the 39 districts of Istanbul were elected, along with municipal councillors for each district municipality. The metropolitan municipality race was one of the most high-profile and close watched elections in the country, with the Justice and Development Party (AK Party) candidate Kadir Topbaş being re-elected for a third consecutive term as mayor with 47.9% of the vote. Mustafa Sarıgül, the Republican People's Party (CHP) candidate, came second with 40% of the vote.

2014 Istanbul mayoral election
- Voters: 9.997.024
- Ballot boxes: 32.165
- AK Party: 26 / 40
- CHP: 14 / 40

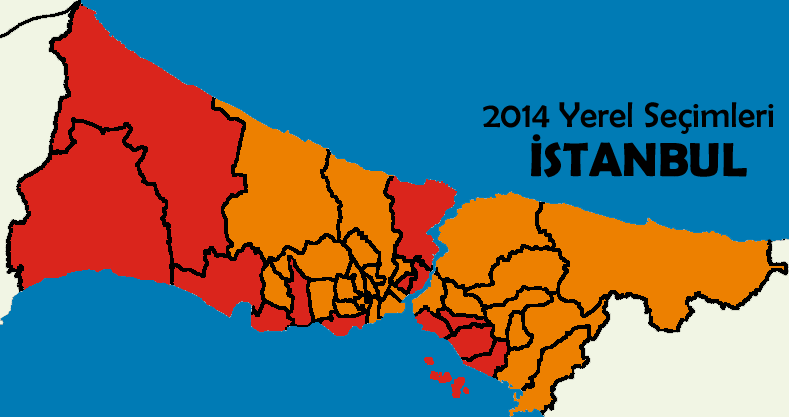
Districts won by the Justice and Development Party Districts won by the Republican People's Party

== Istanbul Metropolitan Municipality ==
Voters		Ballot boxes		
9.997.024		32.165		
Candidates			Results	
Abb.	Party	Nominee	Vote	Per.
AK Party	Justice and Development Party	Kadir Topbaş	4.100.191	%47.9
CHP	Republican People's Party	Mustafa Sarıgül	3.427.157	%40.0
HDP	Peoples' Democratic Party	Sırrı Süreyya Önder	412.875	%4.83
MHP	Nationalist Movement Party	Rasim Acar	339.466	%3.97
SP	Felicity Party	Selman Esmerer	122.907	%1.44
BBP	Great Union Party	Ahmet Yelis	47.437	%0.55
YP	Homeland Party	Okan Bal	16.610	%0.19
İP	Workers' Party	Levent Kırca	15.194	%0.18
HEPAR	Rights and Equality Party	Ahmet Ercan	14.214	%0.17
BTP	Independent Turkey Party	Ahmet Rıdvan Murat	10.632	%0.12
TKP	Communist Party of Turkey	Aydemir Güler	7.523	%0.09
HAK-PAR	Rights and Freedoms Party	Mehmet Celal Baykara	7.365	%0.09
DSP	Democratic Left Party	Muammer Aydın	7.207	%0.08
DP	Democratic Party	Hüseyin Güler	5.591	%0.07
HKP	People's Liberation Party	Zeliha Kıran Danacı	4.346	%0.05
DYP	True Path Party	Kemal Abdullahoğlu	2.339	%0.03
MP	Nation Party	Derviş Doğan	2.309	%0.03
LDP	Liberal Democratic Party	Şule Kılıçarslan	1.423	%0.02
BĞMSZ	Independent	Şafak Tanrıverdi	1.074	%0.01
BĞMSZ	Independent	Süleyman Gök	654	%0.00
BĞMSZ	Independent	Burcu Deniz	412	%0.00
BĞMSZ	Independent	Elif Selen Gülün	223	%0.00
BĞMSZ	Independent	Ümit Kadir Özdemir	206	%0.00
BĞMSZ	Independent	Fatma Ragibe Kanıkuru Loğoğlu	189	%0.00
BĞMSZ	Independent	Nihal Kaya	186	%0.00
BĞMSZ	Independent	Erdal Karasu	155	%0.00
BĞMSZ	Independent	Celal Çam	143	%0.00
BĞMSZ	Independent	Galip İlhaner	140	%0.00
BĞMSZ	Independent	Ömer Coşkun	137	%0.00
BĞMSZ	Independent	Ersin Baş	133	%0.00
BĞMSZ	Independent	Halit Aslan	132	%0.00
BĞMSZ	Independent	Kaya Mutlu	132	%0.00
Total			8.548.702	
Invalid votes			387.313	
Turnout			%89.39	
Ref.: YSK

== Districts ==
=== Adalar ===

Voters		Ballot boxes		
12,369		45		
Candidates			Results	
Abb.	Party	Nominee	Vote	Per.
CHP	Republican People's Party	Atilla Aytaç	5.207	%50.1
AK Party	Justice and Development Party	Coşkun Özden	4.381	%42.1
HDP	Peoples' Democratic Party	Kayuş Çalıkman Gavrilof	391	%3.76
MHP	Nationalist Movement Party	Hülya Azimli	283	%2.72
SP	Felicity Party	Mehmet Gökçınar	82	%0.78
İP	Workers' Party	Adviye Bal	15	%0.14
BBP	Great Union Party	Hüseyin Sedat İnal	12	%0.11
BTP	Independent Turkey Party	Taner Önel	11	%0.10
DSP	Democratic Left Party	Muammer Melih Civelek	3	%0.02
Total			10.385	
Invalid votes			403	
Turnout			%87.22	
Ref.: YSK

=== Arnavutköy ===

Voters		Ballot boxes		
136,298		453		
Candidates			Results	
Abb.	Party	Nominee	Vote	Per.
AK Party	Justice and Development Party	Ahmet Haşimi Baltacı	60.256	%51.6
MHP	Nationalist Movement Party	Yüksel Emir	25.885	%22.1
HDP	Peoples' Democratic Party	Harun Kaya	13.560	%11.6
CHP	Republican People's Party	Ruhi Tuncel	9.791	%8.39
SP	Felicity Party	Yusuf Dal	4.498	%3.85
BBP	Great Union Party	Jale İyem	1.007	%0.86
BĞMSZ	Independent	Dilek Aras	549	%0.47
BTP	Independent Turkey Party	Recayi Özcan	433	%0.37
DP	Democratic Party	Sedat Sakman	243	%0.20
İP	Workers' Party	Yılmaz Hikmet Tunçok	135	%0.11
DSP	Democratic Left Party	Hikmet Kabuk	86	%0.07
TURK-P	Social Reconciliation Reform and Development Party	Muhittin Özcan Yapıcı	83	%0.07
DYP	True Path Party	Halil Sarıhan	60	%0.05
LDP	Liberal Democratic Party	Selim Aydın	44	%0.03
BĞMSZ	Independent	Samih Bakan	30	%0.02
Total			116.660	
Invalid votes			7.151	
Turnout			%90.84	
Ref.: YSK

=== Ataşehir ===

Voters		Ballot boxes		
291,049		926		
Candidates			Results	
Abb.	Party	Nominee	Vote	Per.
CHP	Republican People's Party	Battal İlgezdi	127.018	%49.6
AK Party	Justice and Development Party	Nimetullah Topu	107.037	%41.8
MHP	Nationalist Movement Party	Zeki Bulut	9.652	%3.77
HDP	Peoples' Democratic Party	Necibe İnci İncesağır	6.626	%2.59
SP	Felicity Party	Noğman Yüksel	2.306	%0.90
BBP	Great Union Party	Nafız Kürklü	1.368	%0.53
İP	Workers’ Party	Memet Orhan Şenoğlu	387	%0.15
DP	Democratic Party	Müsemma Özbeğ	348	%0.13
DSP	Democratic Left Party	Sadet Garan	333	%0.13
BTP	Independent Turkey Party	Rahmi Şen	230	%0.08
TURK-P	Social Reconciliation Reform and Development Party	Mehmet Yeşilkaya	76	%0.02
DYP	True Path Party	Ogün Çağlar	74	%0.02
LDP	Liberal Democratic Party	Ali Çavuşoğlu	72	%0.02
BĞMSZ	Independent	Burak Kemal Tanrısever	68	%0.02
Total			255.595	
Invalid votes			8.431	
Turnout			%90.72	
Ref.: YSK

=== Avcılar ===

Voters		Ballot boxes		
288,678		919		
Candidates			Results	
Abb.	Party	Nominee	Vote	Per.
CHP	Republican People's Party	Hanay Handan Toprak Benli	106.506	%44.0
AK Party	Justice and Development Party	Bayram Şenocak	98.904	%40.8
MHP	Nationalist Movement Party	İnci Demirel	22.082	%9.12
HDP	Peoples' Democratic Party	Zehra Şahin Yeşil	9.539	%3.94
SP	Felicity Party	Ender Esiner	1.884	%0.77
BBP	Great Union Party	Bilal Kiracıoğlu	820	%0.33
HEPAR	Rights and Equality Party	Emine Serpil Erişir	583	%0.24
YP	Homeland Party	Saim Topal	349	%0.14
BTP	Independent Turkey Party	Özcan Cırit	329	%0.13
İP	Workers’ Party	Tuncer Avcı	290	%0.11
DSP	Democratic Left Party	Hanife Neslihan Saraçoğlu Baykara	222	%0.09
DP	Democratic Party	İsmail Bektaş	146	%0.06
TURK-P	Social Reconciliation Reform and Development Party	Saadettin Murat Moğul	80	%0.03
MP	Nation Party	Muhittin Elmalı	71	%0.02
LDP	Liberal Democratic Party	İsmail Özgür Yıldız	67	%0.02
Total			241.872	
Invalid votes			12.176	
Turnout			%88.00	
Ref.: YSK

=== Bağcılar ===

Voters		Ballot boxes		
500,615		1585		
Candidates			Results	
Abb.	Party	Nominee	Vote	Per.
AK Party	Justice and Development Party	Lokman Çağırıcı	242.547	%57.2
CHP	Republican People's Party	Muhammet Çakmak	83.483	%19.7
HDP	Peoples' Democratic Party	Fırat Epözdemir	39.641	%9.36
MHP	Nationalist Movement Party	Hacı Murat Yümlü	28.592	%6.75
SP	Felicity Party	Mesut Doğan	21.731	%5.13
BBP	Great Union Party	Muhammet Bayram	3.426	%0.80
BTP	Independent Turkey Party	Mehmet Hakan Akkuş	1.352	%0.31
DP	Democratic Party	Abuzer Mutlu	1.167	%0.27
İP	Workers’ Party	Hamiyet Gürsoy	579	%0.13
DSP	Democratic Left Party	Haydar Aktaş	379	%0.08
MP	Nation Party	Ahmet Aktaş	213	%0.05
LDP	Liberal Democratic Party	Abdülkadir Alçep	142	%0.03
BĞMSZ	Independent	Mustafa Emre Yenici	142	%0.03
Total			423.394	
Invalid votes			19.922	
Turnout			%88.55	
Ref.: YSK

=== Bahçelievler ===

Voters		Ballot boxes		
434,089		1389		
Candidates			Results	
Abb.	Party	Nominee	Vote	Per.
AK Party	Justice and Development Party	Osman Develioğlu	177.228	%48.1
CHP	Republican People's Party	Saffet Bulut	130.947	%35.5
MHP	Nationalist Movement Party	Halim Küçükali	22.497	%6.10
HDP	Peoples' Democratic Party	Servet Öncü	22.198	%6.02
SP	Felicity Party	Ali İhsan Gündoğdu	9.328	%2.53
BBP	Great Union Party	Ali Karahasanoğlu	2.788	%0.75
DP	Democratic Party	Cemal Yalanız	1.196	%0.32
BTP	Independent Turkey Party	Murat Gülen	662	%0.17
İP	Workers’ Party	Hayati Kızılkaya	524	%0.14
DSP	Democratic Left Party	Dursun Eryılmaz	342	%0.09
BĞMSZ	Independent	Erkan Eryılmaz	185	%0.05
MP	Nation Party	Hüseyin Abdullahoğlu	161	%0.04
LDP	Liberal Democratic Party	Ziya Çelebi Sinça	155	%0.04
Total			368.211	
Invalid votes			14.942	
Turnout			%88.27	
Ref.: YSK

=== Bakırköy ===

Voters		Ballot boxes		
173,391		561		
Candidates			Results	
Abb.	Party	Nominee	Vote	Per.
CHP	Republican People's Party	Bülent Kerimoğlu	102.301	%68.7
AK Party	Justice and Development Party	Mehmet Emin Ertekin	32.719	%22.0
MHP	Nationalist Movement Party	Mustafa Turan	7.893	%5.30
HDP	Peoples' Democratic Party	Vahit Genç	3.023	%2.03
SP	Felicity Party	Ramazan Boyalık	856	%0.57
BBP	Great Union Party	Atilla Kucur	654	%0.43
DSP	Democratic Left Party	Saffet Şen	289	%0.19
HEPAR	Rights and Equality Party	Zekayi Durak	286	%0.19
DP	Democratic Party	Filiz Ercan	210	%0.14
BTP	Independent Turkey Party	Cihangir Aydın	125	%0.08
YP	Homeland Party	Serkan Umudum	112	%0.07
DYP	True Path Party	Necmiye Abdullahoğlu	85	%0.05
LDP	Liberal Democratic Party	Mustafa Kürşat Çetinkoz	61	%0.04
BĞMSZ	Independent	Ramazan Bayar	55	%0.03
MP	Nation Party	Oya Veyis	34	%0.02
Total			148.703	
Invalid votes			3.723	
Turnout			%87.91	
Ref.: YSK

=== Başakşehir ===

Voters		Ballot boxes		
212,289		682		
Candidates			Results	
Abb.	Party	Nominee	Vote	Per.
AK Party	Justice and Development Party	Mevlüt Uysal	92.495	%50.1
CHP	Republican People's Party	Özgür Karabat	62.493	%33.8
HDP	Peoples' Democratic Party	Şemsettin Arslan	13.165	%7.14
MHP	Nationalist Movement Party	Muharrem Kaya	7.827	%4.24
SP	Felicity Party	Neşet Çevik	5.981	%3.24
BBP	Great Union Party	Mehmet Emin Demirbağ	1.180	%0.64
BTP	Independent Turkey Party	Ali Cengiz Taygan	420	%0.22
YP	Homeland Party	Hakan Topel	246	%0.13
İP	Workers’ Party	Avni Bavaş	176	%0.09
DP	Democratic Party	Ahmed Serdaroğlu	136	%0.07
DSP	Democratic Left Party	Ayhan Taşkın	90	%0.04
MP	Nation Party	Azimet Yalçın	78	%0.04
LDP	Liberal Democratic Party	Nihal Şahin Yaman	41	%0.02
TURK-P	Social Reconciliation Reform and Development Party	Bülent Binici	40	%0.04
Total			184.368	
Invalid votes			7.956	
Turnout			%90.60	
Ref.: YSK

=== Bayrampaşa ===

Voters		Ballot boxes		
197,412		633		
Candidates			Results	
Abb.	Party	Nominee	Vote	Per.
AK Party	Justice and Development Party	Atila Aydıner	86.571	%50.3
CHP	Republican People's Party	Bahri Sipahi	67.750	%39.4
MHP	Nationalist Movement Party	Mehmet Mert Toker	7.318	%4.25
SP	Felicity Party	İsmail Acar	4.528	%2.63
HDP	Peoples' Democratic Party	Erdal Oflaz	3.006	%1.74
BBP	Great Union Party	Fuat Küçük	871	%0.50
YP	Homeland Party	Murat Melih Yılmaz	554	%0.32
HEPAR	Rights and Equality Party	Sefa Özgüneysu	276	%0.16
İP	Workers’ Party	Serpil Akıllı	229	%0.13
DSP	Democratic Left Party	Suat Bahçekapılı	206	%0.11
BTP	Independent Turkey Party	Mithat Kandemir	179	%0.10
DP	Democratic Party	Ali Rıza Tunay	177	%0.10
MP	Nation Party	Etem Kuri	57	%0.03
TURK-P	Social Reconciliation Reform and Development Party	Şahin Erbay	48	%0.02
LDP	Liberal Democratic Party	Muhammet Karaoğlu	28	%0.01
BĞMSZ	Independent	Ahmet Gülümser	20	%0.01
Total			171.818	
Invalid votes			6.733	
Turnout			%90.45	
Ref.: YSK

=== Beşiktaş ===

Voters		Ballot boxes		
148,221		480		
Candidates			Results	
Abb.	Party	Nominee	Vote	Per.
CHP	Republican People's Party	Murat Hazinedar	97.497	%76.2
AK Party	Justice and Development Party	Zeynel Abidin Okul	21.179	%16.5
MHP	Nationalist Movement Party	Burhan Akdağ	3.877	%3.03
HDP	Peoples' Democratic Party	Ahmet Saymadi	2.125	%1.66
DSP	Democratic Left Party	Mustafa Can Ataklı	1.253	%0.98
SP	Felicity Party	Murat Kutlu Sezen	520	%0.40
İP	Workers’ Party	Füsün İkikardeş	517	%0.40
BBP	Great Union Party	Muhammet Umut Dövletoğulları	279	%0.21
HEPAR	Rights and Equality Party	Enver Alper Mutluer	183	%0.14
DP	Democratic Party	Muhsin Şener Kıralı	143	%0.11
YP	Homeland Party	Muzaffer Melih Konak	103	%0.08
LDP	Liberal Democratic Party	Kaan Alper	57	%0.04
BTP	Independent Turkey Party	Hasan Hüseyin Savukduran	52	%0.04
MP	Nation Party	Bülent Yılmaz	19	%0.01
Total			127.804	
Invalid votes			3.306	
Turnout			%88.46	
Ref.: YSK

=== Beykoz ===

Voters		Ballot boxes		
181,749		597		
Candidates			Results	
Abb.	Party	Nominee	Vote	Per.
AK Party	Justice and Development Party	Yücel Çelikbilek	69.757	%44.6
CHP	Republican People's Party	Hızır Yılmaz	51.234	%32.7
MHP	Nationalist Movement Party	Alaattin Köseler	15.286	%9.77
BBP	Great Union Party	Bilgehan Murat Miniç	10.508	%6.72
SP	Felicity Party	Selman Yücel	4.121	%2.63
HDP	Peoples' Democratic Party	Neriman Birgül Hakan	2.761	%1.76
MP	Nation Party	Mehmet Ali Anafarta	841	%0.53
DP	Democratic Party	Ali Bülent Varol	443	%0.28
DSP	Democratic Left Party	Recayi Çelik	376	%0.24
HEPAR	Rights and Equality Party	Nevzat Çetin	341	%0.21
İP	Workers’ Party	Can Çakmak	299	%0.19
BTP	Independent Turkey Party	Ramazan Mehmet Berber	231	%0.14
BĞMSZ	Independent	Kubulay Tekin	44	%0.02
LDP	Liberal Democratic Party	Fatma Sibel Lilioğlu	33	%0.02
BĞMSZ	Independent	Hamit Olgun Coşkuntuna	33	%0.02
BĞMSZ	Independent	Murat Eken	30	%0.01
Total			156.338	
Invalid votes			8.647	
Turnout			%90.78	
Ref.: YSK

=== Beylikdüzü ===

Voters		Ballot boxes		
172,949		552		
Candidates			Results	
Abb.	Party	Nominee	Vote	Per.
CHP	Republican People's Party	Ekrem İmamoğlu	76.034	%50.8
AK Party	Justice and Development Party	Yusuf Uzun	59.309	%39.6
MHP	Nationalist Movement Party	Ethem Baykal	6.971	%4.66
HDP	Peoples' Democratic Party	Celal Işık	3.981	%2.66
SP	Felicity Party	Mustafa Hasan Öz	1.191	%0.79
BBP	Great Union Party	Volkan Berber	886	%0.59
İP	Workers’ Party	Coşkun Ege	317	%0.21
HEPAR	Rights and Equality Party	Serdar Şıdım	283	%0.18
DP	Democratic Party	Ali Savut	283	%0.18
BTP	Independent Turkey Party	Emine Namlı	162	%0.10
DSP	Democratic Left Party	Atilla Kubilay Canbaz	73	%0.04
BĞMSZ	Independent	Murat Kızgın	43	%0.02
MP	Nation Party	Ayten Görüşük	35	%0.02
LDP	Liberal Democratic Party	İlker Özdel	22	%0.01
Total			149.590	
Invalid votes			6.151	
Turnout			%90.05	
Ref.: YSK

=== Beyoğlu ===

Voters		Ballot boxes		
176,186		574		
Candidates			Results	
Abb.	Party	Nominee	Vote	Per.
AK Party	Justice and Development Party	Ahmet Misbah Demircan	69.549	%47.8
CHP	Republican People's Party	Aylin Kotil Yıldırımer	51.184	%35.1
HDP	Peoples' Democratic Party	Seyhan Alma	10.590	%7.28
MHP	Nationalist Movement Party	Osman Gür	7.105	%4.88
SP	Felicity Party	Mustafa Kaya	4.691	%3.22
BBP	Great Union Party	Fevzi Çoşkun	710	%0.48
İP	Workers’ Party	Merdan Aslan	354	%0.24
YP	Homeland Party	Gökhan Aydoğdu	264	%0.18
HEPAR	Rights and Equality Party	Mihriye Nevra Ölçer	257	%0.17
BTP	Independent Turkey Party	Ertuğrul Hekimoğlu	231	%0.15
DSP	Democratic Left Party	Gürsel Durmaz	203	%0.13
DP	Democratic Party	Çetin Üstaş	137	%0.09
MP	Nation Party	Özcan Yay	55	%0.03
LDP	Liberal Democratic Party	Volkan Gökdemir	42	%0.02
BĞMSZ	Independent	Osman Ertürk	27	%0.01
BĞMSZ	Independent	Sinan Baytekin	21	%0.01
BĞMSZ	Independent	Yılmaz Demirkıran	15	%0.01
Total			145.435	
Invalid votes			7.811	
Turnout			%86.98	
Ref.: YSK

=== Büyükçekmece ===

Voters		Ballot boxes		
149,671		485		
Candidates			Results	
Abb.	Party	Nominee	Vote	Per.
CHP	Republican People's Party	Hasan Akgün	60.470	%47.5
AK Party	Justice and Development Party	Celal Babayiğit	57.026	%44.8
MHP	Nationalist Movement Party	Yaşar Derin	4.684	%3.68
HDP	Peoples' Democratic Party	Tevfik Baraner	2.550	%2.00
SP	Felicity Party	Mahmut Ustahaliloğlu	634	%0.49
BBP	Great Union Party	Uğur Özer	606	%0.47
HEPAR	Rights and Equality Party	Birgen Şıdım	373	%0.29
DP	Democratic Party	Ersin Gürbüz	310	%0.24
İP	Workers’ Party	Seda Önder	201	%0.15
BTP	Independent Turkey Party	İlhan Şahin	114	%0.08
DSP	Democratic Left Party	Erdoğan Hatiboğlu	99	%0.07
LDP	Liberal Democratic Party	İskender Gürkaya	26	%0.02
MP	Nation Party	Hasan Bucak	20	%0.01
BĞMSZ	Independent	Kamil Ata	14	%0.01
Total			127.127	
Invalid votes			6.003	
Turnout			%88.95	
Ref.: YSK

=== Çatalca ===

Voters		Ballot boxes		
49,879		177		
Candidates			Results	
Abb.	Party	Nominee	Vote	Per.
CHP	Republican People's Party	Cem Kara	19.529	%44.5
AK Party	Justice and Development Party	Savaş Barutçu	15.672	%35.7
MHP	Nationalist Movement Party	İsmail İp	7.437	%16.9
HDP	Peoples' Democratic Party	Serpil Kemalbay Pekgözegü	425	%0.96
SP	Felicity Party	Serdar Taşar	288	%0.65
İP	Workers’ Party	İsmail Çirci	177	%0.40
DP	Democratic Party	Bilge Eşmeli	116	%0.26
BBP	Great Union Party	Ali Çelebican	71	%0.16
BTP	Independent Turkey Party	Recep Cevat Yıldır	51	%0.11
DSP	Democratic Left Party	Bayram İğdeli	35	%0.07
LDP	Liberal Democratic Party	Cem Açabuğa	22	%0.05
BĞMSZ	Independent	Ahmet Arslan	17	%0.03
Total			43.840	
Invalid votes			2.519	
Turnout			%92.94	
Ref.: YSK

=== Çekmeköy ===

Voters		Ballot boxes		
140,253		453		
Candidates			Results	
Abb.	Party	Nominee	Vote	Per.
AK Party	Justice and Development Party	Ahmet Poyraz	59.302	%48.6
CHP	Republican People's Party	Seyfettin Yıldırım	46.709	%38.3
MHP	Nationalist Movement Party	Doğan Öztürk Balcı	6.544	%5.37
HDP	Peoples' Democratic Party	Azat Altun	4.720	%3.87
SP	Felicity Party	Adem Boz	2.516	%2.06
BBP	Great Union Party	Hasan Koç	1.383	%1.13
DP	Democratic Party	Hamit Çelik	259	%0.21
BTP	Independent Turkey Party	Abdulmuttalip Örpek	168	%0.14
İP	Workers’ Party	Murat Parlak	145	%0.12
DSP	Democratic Left Party	Perihan Urşan	68	%0.06
DYP	True Path Party	Doğan Sönmez	42	%0.03
BĞMSZ	Independent	İsmail İsmailoğlu	36	%0.02
LDP	Liberal Democratic Party	Ahmet Emin Şık	27	%0.02
Total			121.919	
Invalid votes			6.675	
Turnout			%91.69	
Ref.: YSK

=== Esenler ===

Voters		Ballot boxes		
306,183		982		
Candidates			Results	
Abb.	Party	Nominee	Vote	Per.
AK Party	Justice and Development Party	Mehmet Tevfik Göksu	162.889	%62.3
CHP	Republican People's Party	Mahmut Aksal Örüklü	39.191	%14.9
SP	Felicity Party	Erol Urhan	19.805	%7.58
MHP	Nationalist Movement Party	Ahmet Fidan	17.613	%6.74
HDP	Peoples' Democratic Party	Nuriye Avşar	17.024	%6.51
BBP	Great Union Party	Erol Hacigül	2.213	%0.85
YP	Homeland Party	Meral Gürdal	657	%0.25
BTP	Independent Turkey Party	Altan Kalemci	586	%0.22
İP	Workers’ Party	Oktay Şahin	332	%0.13
DP	Democratic Party	İsa Şeker	313	%0.12
MP	Nation Party	Murat İstanbullu	196	%0.07
DSP	Democratic Left Party	Alaattin Bayram	195	%0.07
TURK-P	Social Reconciliation Reform and Development Party	Meliha Dörtkardeş	189	%0.07
BĞMSZ	Independent	Budak Yıldırım	104	%0.04
LDP	Liberal Democratic Party	Kemal Aker	86	%0.03
Total			261.393	
Invalid votes			13.391	
Turnout			%89.98	
Ref.: YSK

=== Esenyurt ===

Voters		Ballot boxes		
411,720		1313		
Candidates			Results	
Abb.	Party	Nominee	Vote	Per.
AK Party	Justice and Development Party	Necmi Kadıoğlu	161.698	%47.0
CHP	Republican People's Party	Çetin Çapan	119.539	%34.7
HDP	Peoples' Democratic Party	Cüneyt Caniş	34.066	%9.90
MHP	Nationalist Movement Party	Halit Özer	20.393	%5.93
SP	Felicity Party	Abdullah İlkadlı	3.299	%0.96
BBP	Great Union Party	Muammer Budak	1.702	%0.49
BTP	Independent Turkey Party	Ali Akgül	1.160	%0.34
DP	Democratic Party	Cesur Çiftçi	795	%0.23
İP	Workers’ Party	Zihni Selvi	558	%0.16
DSP	Democratic Left Party	İbrahim Özdemir	311	%0.09
DYP	True Path Party	Emrullah Güneş	163	%0.05
MP	Nation Party	Metin Bucak	149	%0.04
LDP	Liberal Democratic Party	Fazlı Soymaz	102	%0.03
BĞMSZ	Independent	Engin Emrah Biçer	72	%0.02
Total			344.007	
Invalid votes			19.263	
Turnout			%88.23	
Ref.: YSK

=== Eyüp ===

Voters		Ballot boxes		
258,837		838		
Candidates			Results	
Abb.	Party	Nominee	Vote	Per.
AK Party	Justice and Development Party	Remzi Aydın	104.303	%46.6
CHP	Republican People's Party	Ferzan Özer	89.667	%40.1
MHP	Nationalist Movement Party	Kamil Yıldız	13.194	%5.90
SP	Felicity Party	Celal Çoban	7.570	%3.39
HDP	Peoples' Democratic Party	Asya Ülker	5.739	%2.57
BBP	Great Union Party	Mustafa Tali	1.052	%0.47
HEPAR	Rights and Equality Party	Pınar Çuhalı	417	%0.19
DSP	Democratic Left Party	Faik Kaya	367	%0.16
YP	Homeland Party	Mustafa Bayburt	309	%0.14
BTP	Independent Turkey Party	Bayram Özdemir	288	%0.13
İP	Workers’ Party	Musa Artur Önemci	248	%0.11
DP	Democratic Party	Adnan Öztürk	199	%0.09
MP	Nation Party	Saffet Geniş	86	%0.04
LDP	Liberal Democratic Party	Fetislam Özer	58	%0.03
TURK-P	Social Reconciliation Reform and Development Party	Gökmen Kılıç	49	%0.02
Total			223.546	
Invalid votes			10.402	
Turnout			%90.38	
Ref.: YSK

=== Fatih ===

Voters		Ballot boxes		
309,745		1016		
Candidates			Results	
Abb.	Party	Nominee	Vote	Per.
AK Party	Justice and Development Party	Mustafa Demir	122.656	%48.6
CHP	Republican People's Party	Sabri Özkan Erbakan	79.624	%31.5
MHP	Nationalist Movement Party	Metin Örel	17.785	%7.05
SP	Felicity Party	Lütfi Kibiroğlu	16.029	%6.36
HDP	Peoples' Democratic Party	Turhan Yıldırım	12.079	%4.79
BBP	Great Union Party	Kemal Yücel	1.347	%0.53
İP	Workers’ Party	Şevki Bilgin	599	%0.24
YP	Homeland Party	Ogün Kemal Turan	593	%0.24
BTP	Independent Turkey Party	Mustafa Reşit Sofuoğlu	440	%0.17
DSP	Democratic Left Party	Erdoğan Tülümenler	257	%0.10
DP	Democratic Party	İbrahim Haytaoğlu	246	%0.10
DYP	True Path Party	Ömer Akkoyun	127	%0.05
MP	Nation Party	Mevlüt Koçoğlu	112	%0.04
TURK-P	Social Reconciliation Reform and Development Party	Erol Kılıç	93	%0.04
LDP	Liberal Democratic Party	Selim Keskin	74	%0.03
BĞMSZ	Independent	Yılmaz Geniş	60	%0.02
Total			252.121	
Invalid votes			13.587	
Turnout			%85.78	
Ref.: YSK

=== Gaziosmanpaşa ===

Voters		Ballot boxes		
345,180		1094		
Candidates			Results	
Abb.	Party	Nominee	Vote	Per.
AK Party	Justice and Development Party	Hasan Tahsin Usta	150.706	%51.3
CHP	Republican People's Party	Selahattin Meriç	73.861	%25.1
SP	Felicity Party	Bilal Ay	37.245	%12.6
HDP	Peoples' Democratic Party	Erdal Çelik	14.385	%4.90
MHP	Nationalist Movement Party	Mikail Aras	12.437	%4.24
BBP	Great Union Party	Fedai Karakol	1.268	%0.43
DP	Democratic Party	Ferruh Şendur	1.037	%0.35
BTP	Independent Turkey Party	Yaşar Teber	617	%0.21
İP	Workers’ Party	Cem Çalışkan	583	%0.20
HEPAR	Rights and Equality Party	Ömür Atahan	549	%0.19
DSP	Democratic Left Party	Alaattin Korkmaz	484	%0.16
MP	Nation Party	Yurdal Altın	204	%0.07
LDP	Liberal Democratic Party	Hakkı Kanbo	190	%0.06
BĞMSZ	Independent	Eşref Altınoluk	85	%0.02
Total			293.651	
Invalid votes			13.170	
Turnout			%88.89	
Ref.: YSK

=== Güngören ===

Voters		Ballot boxes		
221,123		705		
Candidates			Results	
Abb.	Party	Nominee	Vote	Per.
AK Party	Justice and Development Party	Şakir Yücel Karaman	93.996	%50.1
CHP	Republican People's Party	Ahmet Güzel	57.840	%30.8
MHP	Nationalist Movement Party	Recep Seymen	12.646	%6.75
HDP	Peoples' Democratic Party	Mehmet Turp	10.759	%5.75
SP	Felicity Party	Abdulkadir Çelebi	8.940	%4.77
BBP	Great Union Party	Kenan Temel	1.388	%0.74
BTP	Independent Turkey Party	Hasan Hitaloğlu	531	%0.28
DP	Democratic Party	Cemal Bacakcı	410	%0.22
İP	Workers’ Party	Ömer Korkmaz	320	%0.17
DSP	Democratic Left Party	Tekin Oruç	128	%0.07
MP	Nation Party	Hatice Koçak	108	%0.06
LDP	Liberal Democratic Party	Yalçın Erken	91	%0.05
BĞMSZ	Independent	Orhan Çebi	85	%0.05
BĞMSZ	Independent	Murat İncekara	30	%0.02
Total			187.272	
Invalid votes			8.260	
Turnout			%88.43	
Ref.: YSK

=== Kadıköy ===

Voters		Ballot boxes		
415,907		1337		
Candidates			Results	
Abb.	Party	Nominee	Vote	Per.
CHP	Republican People's Party	Aykurt Nuhoğlu	260.439	%72.4
AK Party	Justice and Development Party	Hurşit Yıldırım	73.598	%20.4
MHP	Nationalist Movement Party	Levent Akçay	12.241	%3.41
HDP	Peoples' Democratic Party	Mukaddes Çelik	6.398	%1.78
İP	Workers’ Party	Suzan Aksoy	1.912	%0.53
SP	Felicity Party	Bekir Cesur	1.643	%0.46
BBP	Great Union Party	Şenol Gedikli	1.086	%0.30
HEPAR	Rights and Equality Party	Halide Yurteri	693	%0.19
DSP	Democratic Left Party	Hakkı Çarpa	377	%0.10
YP	Homeland Party	Alper Çağılkan	273	%0.08
DP	Democratic Party	Yavuz Nural	226	%0.06
DYP	True Path Party	Pelin Bora	188	%0.05
LDP	Liberal Democratic Party	İsmail Güner	128	%0.04
BTP	Independent Turkey Party	Taner Yılmaz	125	%0.03
MP	Nation Party	Nefise Demirezen	54	%0.01
BĞMSZ	Independent	Fatih Şahinler	0	%0.00
Total			359.472	
Invalid votes			10.019	
Turnout			%88.84	
Ref.: YSK

=== Kağıthane ===

Voters		Ballot boxes		
306,598		985		
Candidates			Results	
Abb.	Party	Nominee	Vote	Per.
AK Party	Justice and Development Party	Fazlı Kılıç	131.545	%50.9
CHP	Republican People's Party	Serdar Kurşun	77.363	%29.9
MHP	Nationalist Movement Party	Ali Derindağ	19.804	%7.67
SP	Felicity Party	Zeynel Keskin	15.367	%5.95
HDP	Peoples' Democratic Party	Ayten Kaya	9.591	%3.71
BBP	Great Union Party	Adem Mamaç	2.485	%0.96
DP	Democratic Party	Aynur Koyunoğlu	484	%0.19
İP	Workers’ Party	Zeynep Türesin Arasan	410	%0.16
BTP	Independent Turkey Party	Yaşar Öten	396	%0.15
DSP	Democratic Left Party	Hüsnü Bediroğlu	265	%0.10
MP	Nation Party	Mehmet Birol Kakı	135	%0.05
TURK-P	Social Reconciliation Reform and Development Party	Yadali Özgündüz	96	%0.04
DYP	True Path Party	Demet Özgül	81	%0.03
LDP	Liberal Democratic Party	Süleyman Sedat Satal	73	%0.03
BĞMSZ	Independent	Sebahattin Kara	55	%0.02
BĞMSZ	Independent	Mustafa Çağlar Akgün	34	%0.01
BĞMSZ	Independent	Alpaslan Şenköylü	9	%0.00
Total			258.193	
Invalid votes			14.196	
Turnout			%88.84	
Ref.: YSK

=== Kartal ===

Voters		Ballot boxes		
331,658		1068		
Candidates			Results	
Abb.	Party	Nominee	Vote	Per.
CHP	Republican People's Party	Altınok Öz	128.531	%44.8
AK Party	Justice and Development Party	Temurhan Yıldız	122.585	%42.8
MHP	Nationalist Movement Party	Erhan Kekeç	17.284	%6.04
HDP	Peoples' Democratic Party	Hatice Doğan	8.252	%2.88
SP	Felicity Party	Ali İsmail Kızılgöz	4.786	%1.67
BBP	Great Union Party	Melih Işıksalan	1.709	%0.60
DSP	Democratic Left Party	Şahin Kaya	1.319	%0.46
İP	Workers’ Party	Altan Tüfekçi	653	%0.23
DP	Democratic Party	Müslim Şahanoğlu	588	%0.21
BTP	Independent Turkey Party	Hüseyin Aras	417	%0.15
BĞMSZ	Independent	Memet Ali Aydoğmuş	94	%0.03
TURK-P	Social Reconciliation Reform and Development Party	Serpil Yıldız	62	%0.02
LDP	Liberal Democratic Party	Ebru Güner	55	%0.02
Total			286.335	
Invalid votes			12.662	
Turnout			%90.15	
Ref.: YSK

=== Küçükçekmece ===

Voters		Ballot boxes		
518,576		1658		
Candidates			Results	
Abb.	Party	Nominee	Vote	Per.
AK Party	Justice and Development Party	Temel Karadeniz	186.707	%42.0
CHP	Republican People's Party	Gökhan Gümüşdağ	175.851	%39.6
MHP	Nationalist Movement Party	Muharrem Yıldız	37.288	%8.41
HDP	Peoples' Democratic Party	Nizamettin Öztürk	29.931	%6.75
SP	Felicity Party	Varol Şahin	7.137	%1.61
BBP	Great Union Party	Savaş Üngör	2.492	%0.56
BTP	Independent Turkey Party	Muhammed Kerim Aktacir	995	%0.22
DP	Democratic Party	Gürkan Akbaba	957	%0.22
DSP	Democratic Left Party	Çiğdem Mercan	943	%0.21
İP	Workers’ Party	Ali Aytekin	699	%0.16
MP	Nation Party	Hikmet Sofu	275	%0.06
TURK-P	Social Reconciliation Reform and Development Party	Birol Dağdeviren	182	%0.04
LDP	Liberal Democratic Party	Alp Pamir	117	%0.03
Total			443.574	
Invalid votes			17.629	
Turnout			%88.94	
Ref.: YSK

=== Maltepe ===

Voters		Ballot boxes		
351,690		1128		
Candidates			Results	
Abb.	Party	Nominee	Vote	Per.
CHP	Republican People's Party	Ali Kılıç	148.907	%49.4
AK Party	Justice and Development Party	Edibe Sözen Yavuz	114.938	%38.1
MHP	Nationalist Movement Party	Arif Tevetoğlu	24.806	%8.23
HDP	Peoples' Democratic Party	Zabit Vurdu	6.422	%2.13
SP	Felicity Party	Mustafa Akın	2.637	%0.87
BBP	Great Union Party	Mustafa Şimşek	1.296	%0.43
İP	Workers’ Party	Şükrü Cengiz Arı	628	%0.21
YP	Homeland Party (Turkey)	Ferhat Cebioğlu	530	%0.18
DSP	Democratic Left Party	Pelin Savaş	369	%0.12
DP	Democratic Party	Gülay Ezibay	352	%0.12
BTP	Independent Turkey Party	Fatih Irmak	315	%0.10
BĞMSZ	Independent	Vedat Öztürk	82	%0.03
LDP	Liberal Democratic Party	Volkan Baylan	82	%0.03
BĞMSZ	Independent	Salih Günaçtı	55	%0.02
BĞMSZ	Independent	Erdal Can	33	%0.01
‘‘‘Total’’’			301.452	
‘‘Invalid votes’’			11.845	
‘‘Turnout’’			%89.08	
‘‘‘Ref.’’’': YSK

=== Pendik ===

Voters		Ballot boxes		
447,930		1432		
Candidates			Results	
Abb.	Party	Nominee	Vote	Per.
AK Party	Justice and Development Party	Salih Kenan Şahin	202.023	%52.9
CHP	Republican People's Party	Tuncer Özyavuz	113.356	%29.6
MHP	Nationalist Movement Party	İbrahim Coşkun	31.154	%8.16
SP	Felicity Party	Mahmut Kılıç	17.236	%4.52
HDP	Peoples' Democratic Party	Hüseyin Avras	11.375	%2.98
BBP	Great Union Party	Sami Daltaban	3.917	%1.03
DP	Democratic Party	Mustafa Kıran	858	%0.22
BTP	Independent Turkey Party	Kaya Doğan	636	%0.17
İP	Workers’ Party	Nurhayat Boyraz	568	%0.15
DSP	Democratic Left Party	Orhan Yeşilyurt	334	%0.09
DYP	True Path Party	Hilmi Mısır	158	%0.04
LDP	Liberal Democratic Party	Metin Mintaz	122	%0.03
‘‘‘Total’’’			381.737	
‘‘Invalid votes’’			19.405	
‘‘Turnout’’			%89.55	
‘‘‘Ref.’’’': YSK

=== Sancaktepe ===

Voters		Ballot boxes		
201,880		644		
Candidates			Results	
Abb.	Party	Nominee	Vote	Per.
AK Party	Justice and Development Party	İsmail Erdem	85.395	%49.0
CHP	Republican People's Party	Özgen Nama	60.620	%34.8
HDP	Peoples' Democratic Party	Engin Aras	12.698	%7.30
MHP	Nationalist Movement Party	İbrahim Özkan	9.551	%5.49
SP	Felicity Party	Recai Demiryürek	3.514	%2.02
BBP	Great Union Party	Hasan Güngörmez	979	%0.56
BTP	Independent Turkey Party	Tuncer Usanmaz	429	%0.25
DP	Democratic Party	Akın Çelik	368	%0.21
İP	Workers’ Party	Kamil Yakar	308	%0.18
DSP	Democratic Left Party	Ayşenur Altan	127	%0.07
BĞMSZ	Independent	Bilal Taşkın	42	%0.02
BĞMSZ	Independent	İlhan Aşkan	22	%0.01
Total			174.053	
Invalid votes			10.062	
Turnout			%91.20	
Ref.: YSK

=== Sarıyer ===

Voters		Ballot boxes		
243,852		806		
Candidates			Results	
Abb.	Party	Nominee	Vote	Per.
CHP	Republican People's Party	Şükrü Genç	107.313	%51.1
AK Party	Justice and Development Party	Mahmut Sedat Özsoy	82.478	%39.2
MHP	Nationalist Movement Party	Ahmet Özyürek	11.625	%5.54
HDP	Peoples' Democratic Party	Önder Birol Bıyık	3.507	%1.67
SP	Felicity Party	Şükrü Dural	2.179	%1.04
BBP	Great Union Party	Hüseyin Koç	1.390	%0.66
İP	Workers’ Party	Attila Hakan Ganimgil	323	%0.15
DSP	Democratic Left Party	Reyhani Orhan	302	%0.14
YP	Homeland Party (Turkey)	Ali Yılmaz	261	%0.12
BTP	Independent Turkey Party	Mustafa Şakir Aktürk	155	%0.07
DP	Democratic Party	Salim Tarakçı	150	%0.07
MP	Nation Party	Orhan Yay	74	%0.04
TURK-P	Social Reconciliation Reform and Development Party	Cevale Bal	68	%0.03
LDP	Liberal Democratic Party	Ali Sami Gonca	63	%0.03
BĞMSZ	Independent	Erol Yankuncu	56	%0.02
Total			209.944	
Invalid votes			8.887	
Turnout			%89.74	
Ref.: YSK

=== Silivri ===

Voters		Ballot boxes		
109,382		385		
Candidates			Results	
Abb.	Party	Nominee	Vote	Per.
CHP	Republican People's Party	Özcan Işıklar	43.980	%48.8
AK Party	Justice and Development Party	Tahir Sert	38.418	%42.6
MHP	Nationalist Movement Party	Fatih Kınalı	3.898	%4.33
HDP	Peoples' Democratic Party	Yusuf Sumeli	1.955	%2.17
SP	Felicity Party	Kadir Tokalı	534	%0.59
BBP	Great Union Party	Hasan Güner	439	%0.49
DP	Democratic Party	Yasin Elmaslı	248	%0.28
İP	Workers’ Party	Kadir Koç	154	%0.17
DSP	Democratic Left Party	Hüseyin Dertop	153	%0.17
BTP	Independent Turkey Party	Özel Al	105	%0.12
ÖDP	Özgürlük ve Dayanışma Partisi	Nurdoğan Özgör	91	%0.10
MP	Nation Party	Fuat Çiçekli	44	%0.05
LDP	Liberal Democratic Party	Şenay Akyol	24	%0.03
BĞMSZ	Independent	Tahsin Doğan	15	%0.01
Total			90.058	
Invalid votes			4.822	
Turnout			%89.61	
Ref.: YSK

=== Sultanbeyli ===

Voters		Ballot boxes		
193,832		618		
Candidates			Results	
Abb.	Party	Nominee	Vote	Per.
AK Party	Justice and Development Party	Hüseyin Keskin	99.967	%61.1
SP	Felicity Party	Halil İbrahim Arıkan	23.575	%14.4
HDP	Peoples' Democratic Party	Asiye Kolçak	18.890	%11.5
CHP	Republican People's Party	Mustafa Çolak	11.502	%7.04
MHP	Nationalist Movement Party	Ümit Gürbüz	6.385	%3.91
BBP	Great Union Party	Necdet Kaya	1.202	%0.74
BTP	Independent Turkey Party	Mustafa Özkan	613	%0.38
DP	Democratic Party	Fatih Yusuf Karakaş	555	%0.34
MP	Nation Party	Naci Cebecioğlu	255	%0.16
İP	Workers’ Party	Mehmet Emin Ayan	226	%0.14
LDP	Liberal Democratic Party	Emine Dilek Balkan	91	%0.06
DSP	Democratic Left Party	Meryem Küçükkaya	87	%0.05
BĞMSZ	Independent	Osman Zerey	83	%0.05
Total			163.431	
Invalid votes			11.847	
Turnout			%90.43	
Ref.: YSK

=== Sultangazi ===

Voters		Ballot boxes		
326,711		1035		
Candidates			Results	
Abb.	Party	Nominee	Vote	Per.
AK Party	Justice and Development Party	Cahit Altunay	164.404	%58.5
CHP	Republican People's Party	Ali Acar	65.130	%23.1
HDP	Peoples' Democratic Party	Meltem Teker	20.572	%7.32
SP	Felicity Party	Hasan Akpınar	16.747	%5.96
MHP	Nationalist Movement Party	İlker Doğanyılmaz	10.150	%3.61
BBP	Great Union Party	Hakan Yıldırım	1.477	%0.53
DP	Democratic Party	Şükrü Bozkurt	794	%0.28
BTP	Independent Turkey Party	Salih Şeker	686	%0.24
HEPAR	Rights and Equality Party	Hamza Erkahraman	433	%0.15
İP	Workers’ Party	Nursel Işıksoy	268	%0.10
DSP	Democratic Left Party	Mehmet Altınay	216	%0.08
LDP	Liberal Democratic Party	Özlem Gökdemir	81	%0.03
BĞMSZ	Independent	Gökhan Güni	35	%0.01
Total			280.993	
Invalid votes			13.975	
Turnout			%90.28	
Ref.: YSK

=== Şile ===

Voters		Ballot boxes		
24,292		106		
Candidates			Results	
Abb.	Party	Nominee	Vote	Per.
AK Party	Justice and Development Party	Can Tabakoğlu	9.528	%45.1
MHP	Nationalist Movement Party	Erol Çelebi	7.624	%36.1
CHP	Republican People's Party	Aras Arslan	3.267	%15.4
HDP	Peoples' Democratic Party	Cengiz Bilek	303	%1.44
SP	Felicity Party	Mehmet Hamdemirci	158	%0.75
DP	Democratic Party	Nahit Melikler	65	%0.31
BBP	Great Union Party	Dursun Al	53	%0.25
İP	Workers’ Party	Güzin Baş	38	%0.18
BTP	Independent Turkey Party	Halit Levent	26	%0.12
HEPAR	Rights and Equality Party	Levent Özsoy	19	%0.09
DSP	Democratic Left Party	Selami Özsoy	16	%0.08
LDP	Liberal Democratic Party	Ali Rıza Özören	5	%0.02
Total			21.102	
Invalid votes			1.265	
Turnout			%92.08	
Ref.: YSK

=== Şişli ===

Voters		Ballot boxes		
209,951		679		
Candidates			Results	
Abb.	Party	Nominee	Vote	Per.
CHP	Republican People's Party	Hasan Hayri İnönü	108.523	%61.5
AK Party	Justice and Development Party	Mukadder Başeğmez	48.531	%27.5
HDP	Peoples' Democratic Party	Ayşe Berktay Hacımirzaoğlu	7.140	%4.05
MHP	Nationalist Movement Party	Mustafa Veysel Güldoğan	7.139	%4.05
İP	Workers’ Party	Ümit Ertaç Zileli	1.732	%0.98
SP	Felicity Party	Engin Yılmaz	1.306	%0.74
BBP	Great Union Party	Yasemin Çiçek	865	%0.49
YP	Homeland Party	Muhammed Aslanoğlu	246	%0.14
DSP	Democratic Left Party	Mahir Yıldırım	221	%0.13
DP	Democratic Party	Yasin Evin	214	%0.12
BTP	Independent Turkey Party	İsmail Sağır	164	%0.09
DYP	True Path Party	Sertan Kırço	67	%0.04
LDP	Liberal Democratic Party	Aydın Rozental	63	%0.04
BĞMSZ	Independent	Yusuf Alacadağ	30	%0.01
MP	Nation Party	Salim Yılmaz	23	%0.01
Total			176.264	
Invalid votes			6.451	
Turnout			%87.03	
Ref.: YSK

=== Tuzla ===

Voters		Ballot boxes		
142,025		459		
Candidates			Results	
Abb.	Party	Nominee	Vote	Per.
AK Party	Justice and Development Party	Şadi Yazıcı	58.918	%48.0
CHP	Republican People's Party	Cemil Ekşi	48.461	%39.5
MHP	Nationalist Movement Party	Adil Erkoç	6.256	%5.10
HDP	Peoples' Democratic Party	Hasan Özdemir	4.160	%3.39
SP	Felicity Party	Ahmet Dikici	2.272	%1.85
BBP	Great Union Party	Mehmet Demirci	1.618	%1.32
DP	Democratic Party	Ahmet Ali Soğuksulu	279	%0.23
DSP	Democratic Left Party	Meryem Tekin	233	%0.19
İP	Workers’ Party	Hüseyin Kılıç	186	%0.15
BTP	Independent Turkey Party	Hasan Gürdal	138	%0.11
LDP	Liberal Democratic Party	Ali Işık	30	%0.02
BĞMSZ	Independent	Musa Tuğra	29	%0.02
Total			122.580	
Invalid votes			6.179	
Turnout			%90.66	
Ref.: YSK

=== Ümraniye ===

Voters		Ballot boxes		
460,049		1474		
Candidates			Results	
Abb.	Party	Nominee	Vote	Per.
AK Party	Justice and Development Party	Hasan Can	194.211	%49.4
CHP	Republican People's Party	Sacit Eyüboğlu	116.902	%29.7
MHP	Nationalist Movement Party	Sabri Şenel	40.446	%10.3
SP	Felicity Party	Yusuf Yüksel	20.251	%5.16
HDP	Peoples' Democratic Party	Rıza Karaman	13.917	%3.55
BBP	Great Union Party	Bülent Taş	3.315	%0.84
YP	Homeland Party	İsmail Uzun	720	%0.18
İP	Workers’ Party	Ünal İnan Albayrak	715	%0.18
BTP	Independent Turkey Party	Resul Balcı	588	%0.15
DSP	Democratic Left Party	Nesim Pakır	477	%0.12
DP	Democratic Party	Mete Çimir	294	%0.07
MP	Nation Party	Salim Demirezen	244	%0.06
BĞMSZ	Independent	Kemal Şimşek	195	%0.04
LDP	Liberal Democratic Party	Hazım Kurdoğlu	127	%0.03
DYP	True Path Party	Hakan Ünal	110	%0.03
Total			392.512	
Invalid votes			21.038	
Turnout			%89.91	
Ref.: YSK

=== Üsküdar ===

Voters		Ballot boxeses		
399,450		1288		
Candidates			Results	
Abb.	Party	Nominee	Vote	Per.
AK Party	Justice and Development Party	Hilmi Türkmen	156.369	%45.6
CHP	Republican People's Party	İhsan Özkes	148.105	%43.2
MHP	Nationalist Movement Party	Habib Suiçmez	18.743	%5.47
SP	Felicity Party	Erol Belen	7.570	%2.21
HDP	Peoples' Democratic Party	Sabri Bingöl	6.478	%1.89
BBP	Great Union Party	Abdullah Genç	2.130	%0.62
İP	Workers’ Party	Perihan Işık Özben	648	%0.19
YP	Homeland Party	Melih Çelik	555	%0.16
HEPAR	Rights and Equality Party	İskender Berrak	509	%0.15
DP	Democratic Party	Nurettin İçer	342	%0.10
BTP	Independent Turkey Party	Ahmet Mithat Cabi	336	%0.10
DSP	Democratic Left Party	Cengiz Sepkin	294	%0.09
MP	Nation Party	Abdullatif Metin	136	%0.04
LDP	Liberal Democratic Party	Şahin Civelek	112	%0.03
BĞMSZ	Independent	Onur Berispek	93	%0.03
Total			342.420	
Invalid votes			15.885	
Turnout			%89.71	
Ref.: YSK

=== Zeytinburnu ===

Voters		Ballot boxeses		
199,818		642		
Candidates			Results	
Abb.	Party	Nominee	Vote	Per.
AK Party	Justice and Development Party	Murat Aydın	81.615	%49.1
CHP	Republican People's Party	Mustafa Fazlıoğlu	48.277	%29.0
MHP	Nationalist Movement Party	Fetih Ahmet Alparslan	15.747	%9.49
HDP	Peoples' Democratic Party	Hüseyin Güngör	14.905	%8.98
SP	Felicity Party	Yahya Kemal Hayırlıoğlu	3.106	%1.87
BBP	Great Union Party	Şeref Kanber	764	%0.46
BTP	Independent Turkey Party	Sevda Ertürk	449	%0.27
YP	Homeland Party	Pınar Bal Yıldırım	320	%0.19
DSP	Democratic Left Party	Ersan Yılmaz	249	%0.15
İP	Workers’ Party	Mehmet Kurnaz	190	%0.11
DP	Democratic Party	İlhan Pehlivan	139	%0.08
DYP	True Path Party	Naciye Sipahioğlu	56	%0.03
MP	Nation Party	Meryem Koçoğlu	50	%0.03
LDP	Liberal Democratic Party	Sezer Duman	47	%0.02
BĞMSZ	Independent	Hasan Güner	46	%0.02
BĞMSZ	Independent	Ahmet Arslan	25	%0.01
Total			165.985	
Invalid votes			9.906	
Turnout			%88.03	
Ref.: YSK
