= Sadettin Tantan =

Turkish politician (born 1941)

Leader of the Homeland Party
- Incumbent
- Assumed office 25 August 2002
- Preceded by: Hakan Önder

Minister of the Interior
- In office 29 May 1999 – 6 June 2001
- Prime Minister: Bülent Ecevit
- Preceded by: Rüştü Kazım Yücelen
- Succeeded by: Cahit Bayar

Member of the Grand National Assembly
- In office 18 April 1999 – 3 November 2002
- Constituency: Istanbul (II) (1999)

Mayor of Fatih
- In office 27 March 1994 – 18 April 1999
- Preceded by: Yusuf Günaydın
- Succeeded by: Eşref Albayrak

Personal details
- Born: 1 January 1941 (age 85) Sapanca, Sakarya Province, Turkey
- Party: Motherland Party (1994-2001); Homeland Party (2002-present)
- Education: Eskişehir Academy of Economic and Commercial Sciences Faculty of Management

Sadettin Tantan (born 1 January 1941) is the Turkish politician who is the founder and current leader of the Homeland Party (Turkish: Yurt Partisi, YURT-P) since 2002. He was a former member of the Motherland Party (ANAP) and served as the Minister of the Interior between 1999 and 2001 under the DSP-ANAP-MHP coalition led by Bülent Ecevit.

== Early life and career ==
Born in Sapanca, Sakarya Province on 1 January 1941 as the son of a Laz father and a Georgian mother. Tantan studied at the Police Institute and graduated from the Eskişehir Academy of Economic and Commercial Sciences Faculty of Management. He received his master's degree from Bursa Institute of Business Administration and went to the United Kingdom to improve his foreign language skills.

=== Police career ===
He began work as a deputy commissioner in the General Directorate of Security, working in the Narcotics and Law Departments of the police forces in Eskişehir, Bursa and Istanbul. He served as the Head of the Provincial Police Departments in Giresun and Tekirdağ. Between 1980 and 1990, he served as the President of the Istanbul Specialised Wrestling Club. He also served as the President of the Wrestling Federation between December 1991 and December 1993.

== Politics ==
=== Mayor of Fatih (1994-99) ===
Tantan joined the Motherland Party (ANAP) in 1994 and was selected as the party's candidate to become the Mayor of Istanbul's Fatih district for the 1994 local elections. He was elected and served as the district's mayor for five years. In 1999, there was speculation that ANAP could select him as a candidate for the Mayor of the Istanbul Metropolitan Municipality for the 1999 local elections. He was instead selected as a candidate to become a Member of Parliament#Member of Parliament for Istanbul's second electoral district in the 1999 general election.

=== Minister of the Interior (1999-2001) ===
After being elected as a Member of Parliament in the 1999 general election, Tantan was appointed as the Minister of the Interior in the triple party coalition that included the Democratic Left Party (DSP), the Nationalist Movement Party (MHP) and the Motherland Party. The coalition was headed by DSP leader Bülent Ecevit. As Interior Minister, Tantan received media coverage for his numerous anti-corruption operations. He was removed from office in a reshuffle on 6 June 2001 and was offered the position of Minister of State responsible for customs. He rejected the position and resigned from the Motherland Party.

=== Homeland Party (2002-present) ===
Tantan co-founded the Homeland Party in January 2002 and was elected leader of the party in an Extraordinary Congress on 25 August 2002, replacing Hakan Önder. The party won 294,909 vote (0.93%) in the November 2002 general election and lost the three MPs that had defected to the party prior to the election, having fallen far below the 10% election threshold needed to win representation in Parliament. The party was unable to contest the 2011 general election due to formal irregularities in submitting required documents to the Supreme Electoral Council. The party put forward mayoral candidates in Istanbul, İzmir and Ankara but failed to win any municipalities. In the June 2015 general election, the party won 9,289 votes (0.02% of the vote) and again failed to win any parliamentary representation.

== Personal life ==
Tantan is married and has six children and nine grandchildren.

== See also ==
- Turkish nationalism
