= Ahmet İsvan =

Turkish politician and agronomist (1923–2017)

Mayor of Istanbul
- In office 1973 – December 1977
- Preceded by: Fahri Atabey
- Succeeded by: Aytekin Kotil

Personal details
- Born: 1923 İstanbul, Turkey
- Died: 1 May 2017 (aged 93–94) Istanbul, Turkey
- Resting place: Taşköprü, Yalova
- Party: Republican People's Party (until 12 September 1980)
- Other political affiliations: Social Democratic Populist Party
- Spouse: Reha İsvan
- Children: 3
- Education: Robert College

Ahmet İsvan (1923–2017) was a leftist Turkish politician. He served as the mayor of Istanbul between 1973 and 1977. He was among the pioneers of the municipal socialism in Turkey.

== Early life and education ==
İsvan was born in Istanbul in 1923. His father was a bureaucrat working in the state-owned Sümerbank. He was a graduate of Robert College where he first met Bülent Ecevit, future leader of the Republican People's Party (CHP). İsvan, Bülent Ecevit and his wife Rahşan were all 1944 graduates of Robert College. İsvan studied agronomy in the USA.

== Career and activities ==
İsvan bought a farm in Taşköprü, Yalova, after his studies. He joined the CHP's Yalova organization. From the early 1970s he became active in the CHP's Istanbul organization. In the 1973 local election he was elected as the mayor of Istanbul from CHP, replacing Fahri Atabey in the post. Bülent Ecevit asked him to run for the office. Isvan took 56.12% of votes in the election. Isvan's tenure ended in December 1977 since he lost the pre-election carried out before the local elections. He was replaced by Aytekin Kotil, a fellow CHP member, in the post. Isvan established the Istanbul People’s Bread during his term as mayor to sell cheap but quality bread to those in need in the city. In 1977 Isvan and other CHP mayors, including Ankara mayor Vedat Dalokay and İzmit mayor Erol Köse issued a declaration on the municipal socialism.

Following the military coup on 12 September 1980 İsvan was arrested and imprisoned for 27 months. The reason for his arrest was his alleged role in the 1 May demonstrations organized by the DISK, a leftist confederation of trade unions. It is reported by David Barchard that Isvan had been tortured in prison. After his release from prison İsvan got involved in agricultural activities at his farm in Taşköprü. Later he joined the Social Democratic Populist Party, being a member of its council. In the party İsvan was part of the left-wing faction alongside Seyfi Oktay and Cevdet Selvi.

== Personal life and death ==
İsvan met his future wife, Reha, while studying at Robert College. They married in 1950 when he returned to Turkey following his graduation from the California University. They had three children.

İsvan died in Istanbul on 1 May 2017. Funeral prayers for him were performed at the Teşvikiye Mosque, Istanbul, and he was buried in Taşköprü next to his wife who had died on 8 May 2013.

== Work ==
İsvan was the author of several books including Başkent gölgesinde İstanbul (Turkish: Istanbul in the shadow of the capital) published by İletişim Publications in 2002 and Köprüler gelip geçmeye. Tarımda bir modernleşme (Turkish: Bridges to come and go. Modernization in agriculture) published in 2009.
