= Soccer America =

American media publisher

- Editor in Chief: Paul Kennedy
- Executive Editor: Mike Woitalla
- Categories: Sport, Soccer
- Publisher: MediaPost
- Founder: Clay Berling
- Founded: 1971; 55 years ago
- Country: United States
- Language: English
- Website: socceramerica.com
- ISSN: 0163-4070

Soccer America, the oldest soccer-specific media publisher in the United States, was founded in 1971 by Clay Berling in Albany, California. The magazine is headquartered in Oakland, California.

== History ==
The magazine was founded by Clay Berling in 1971 under the name Soccer West. In 1972, the name changed to Soccer America because the magazine had begun fulfilling subscriptions nationwide. A weekly print magazine throughout most of its history, Soccer America was included in the Chicago Tribune's selection of "The 50 Best Magazines" in 2003.

Soccer America launched its web site in 1995, its e-letters in 2001, and discontinued its print magazine in 2017. Soccer America's e-letters include: SoccerAmericaDaily, SA Confidential, GameReport, Soccer on TV, the YouthSoccerInsider and Paul Gardner's SoccerTalk. Gardner won the National Soccer Hall of Fame Colin Jose Media Award in 2010. Editor in Chief Paul Kennedy won Colin Jose Media Award in 2017. In 2021, Soccer America celebrated its 50th anniversary.

Current free-lance contributors include Andrea Canales, Beau Dure, Scott French, Ahmet Guvener, Dr. Dev Mishra, Arlo Moore-Bloom, Ian Plenderleith, Brian Sciaretta, Randy Vogt and Dan Woog.

In 1995, Clay Berling was inducted into the National Soccer Hall of Fame.

== See also ==
- Soccer America College Team of the Century
- Soccer America Player of the Year Award
