= Ecmel Kutay =

Turkish general (1927–1998

Ecmel Kutay (1927 – 17 March 1998) was a general in the Turkish military and the 24th mayor of Istanbul. He served in the post from 1981 to 1982.
