= Aytekin Kotil =

Turkish politician and lawyer (1934–1992)

Mayor of Istanbul
- In office December 1977 – 12 September 1980
- Preceded by: Ahmet İsvan
- Succeeded by: Hakkı Akansel

Personal details
- Born: 21 February 1934 Gündoğdu, Rize, Turkey
- Died: 9 August 1992 (aged 58) Istanbul, Turkey
- Resting place: Zincirlikuyu cemetery, Istanbul
- Party: Republican People's Party (until 12 September 1980)
- Other political affiliations: Social Democratic Populist Party
- Children: 3
- Education: Istanbul University

Aytekin Kotil (1934–1992) was a Turkish social democratic politician. He was the mayor of Istanbul being a pioneer in the municipal socialism in Turkey. He was also a member of the Turkish Parliament.

== Early life and education ==
Kotil was born in Gündoğdu, Rize, on 21 February 1934. He had three brothers. He was a graduate of Vefa High School, Istanbul. He received a degree in law from the law faculty of Istanbul University in 1960.

== Career ==
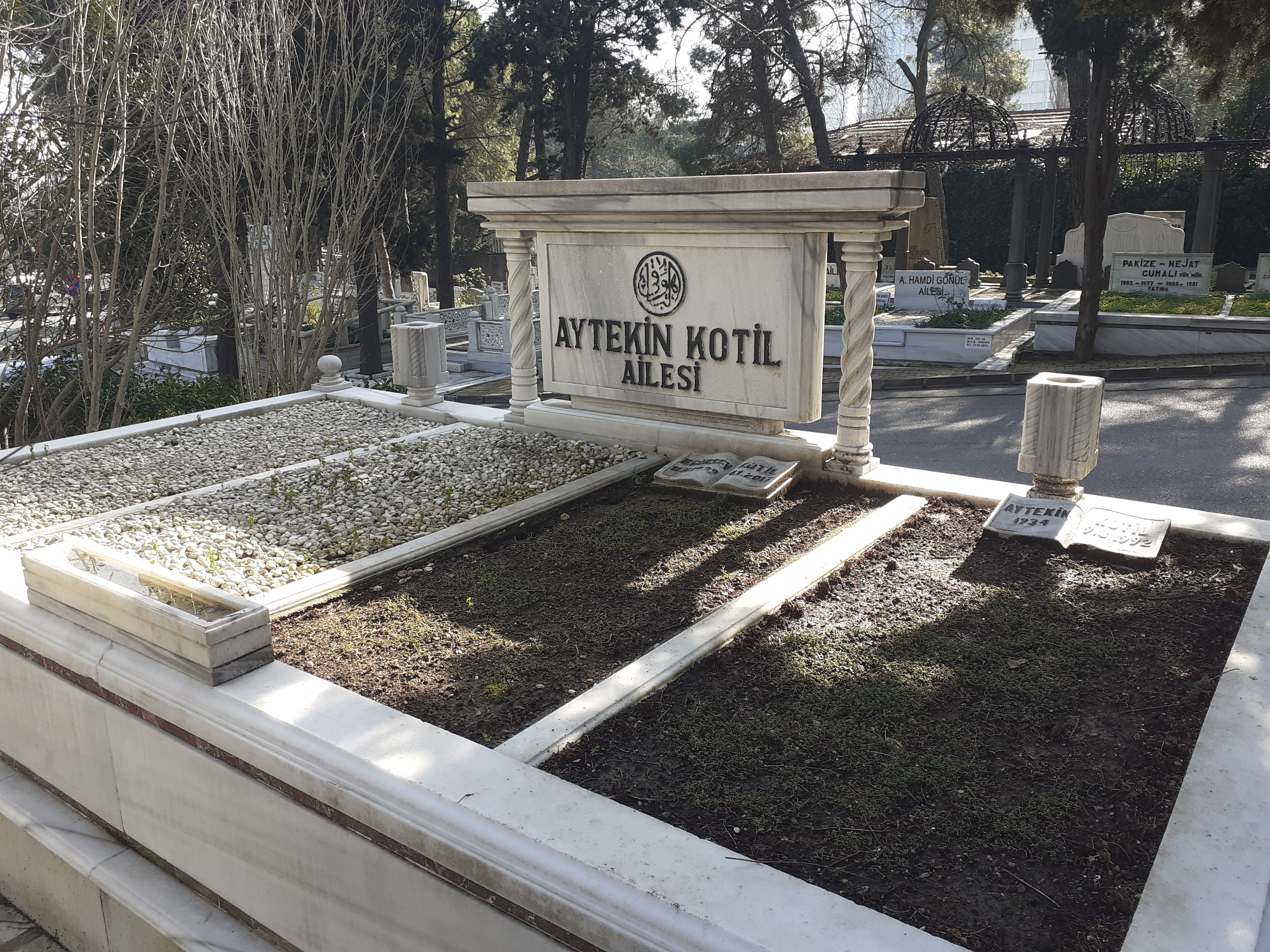
His grave in Zincirlikuyu Cemetery

Following his graduation Kotil worked as a lawyer in Istanbul. He joined the Republican People's Party (CHP) and became active in the CHP's Istanbul organization. He was part of a faction consisted of those party members from the Black Sea region. The group was led by Ali Topuz and included Necdet Uğur, Orhan Eyüpoğlu, Tarhan Erdem and other leading figures in the party. It was the earliest supporter of Bülent Ecevit against İsmet İnönü in the election of the CHP chairmanship in 1972. Kotil and Ali Topuz were ardent followers of Bülent Ecevit's left of center movement.

Kotil was named as the head of the CHP's Istanbul branch in 1973. He was elected as the mayor of Istanbul in the local elections held on 11 December 1977, replacing Ahmet İsvan in the post. His slogan in the election campaign was "reachable, not a speech- but a service-generating mayor." He managed to obtain 56.05% of the votes. Kotil adopted a socialist approach during his tenure. His term ended in September 1980 immediately after the military coup. Kotil's successor in the post was Hakkı Akansel, a military general.

Kotil was elected to the Parliament in the 1987 general election from the Social Democratic Populist Party. In the party Kotil and Ali Topuz supported the leadership of Deniz Baykal against Erdal İnönü.

== Personal life and death ==
Kotil married in 1961 and had three children. He died of liver disease in Istanbul on 9 August 1992. He was buried in the Zincirlikuyu cemetery, Şişli, Istanbul.

== Legacy ==
A park in Bakırköy, Istanbul, was named after him in 1993. In 2014 his biography was published in Turkish with the title Karadenizli Bir Politikacı: Aytekin Kotil (1934–1992).
