= Nurettin Sözen =

Turkish politician

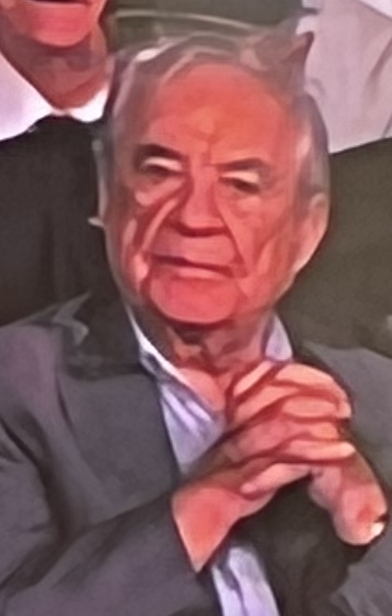
Nurettin Sözen at 30 August Celebrations

Nurettin Sözen (born 1937 in Gürün) is a Turkish doctor, politician and the former mayor of Istanbul, Turkey.

He graduated from Istanbul University and then became a professor in 1978. He was elected as the mayor of Istanbul on March 28, 1989 while he was a member of SHP. He stayed in the office until March 27, 1994. He didn't take any active political missions until he was elected as the deputy of Sivas, his homeland, in 2002. Sözen is a member of Republican People's Party.

He is married and has a child.

Political offices
Preceded by Bedrettin Dalan	Mayor of İstanbul; 1989–1994	Succeeded by Recep Tayyip Erdoğan
