= Homeland Party (Turkey) =

Homeland Party Yurt Partisi
- Leader: Sadettin Tantan
- Founded: 2002
- Split from: Motherland Party
- Headquarters: Ankara, Turkey
- Membership (2026): ▼172
- Ideology: Turkish nationalism Conservatism; National conservatism
- Political position: Right-wing
- Colours: Blue, Red

Website
- http://www.yurtpartisi.org.tr

The Homeland Party (Turkish: Yurt Partisi) is a right-wing, nationalist and conservative, political party in Turkey. The party was founded on 2002 by Sadettin Tantan. In the 2002 elections, the party won 0.9% of the vote and got no seats.

The YP announced their participation in the June 2015 general election, making it the first time in 13 years that the party participated in the country's general elections. The party obtained 9,289 votes (0,02%) and won no seat.
