= Bedrettin Dalan =

Turkish politician (born 1941)

Bedrettin Dalan (born 18 July 1941) is a Turkish engineer, former politician and the first mayor of Greater Istanbul. He is the founder of İSTEK Vakfı, a foundation for education and culture, and Yeditepe University in Istanbul.

He was charged in the Ergenekon trials, and was the subject of an Interpol red notice. In late 2011 Germany declined a request to extradite Dalan. Prosecutors claimed that Dalan was the organization's "number three", and was one of the architects of the 1997 post-modern coup.

== Background ==
Bedrettin Dalan was born in 1941 in Eskişehir, Turkey, to a Kurdish family who are members of the Şêxbizin tribe and migrated to Eskişehir from a village of Bayburt Province in eastern Anatolia to work for the Turkish State Railways. After finishing high school in Germencik, Aydın, where he lived with his parents and seven siblings, Dalan attended the Faculty of Maçka at the Istanbul Technical University, and graduated in 1963 with a degree in electrical engineering.

== Political career ==
In 1983, he joined Turgut Özal to found a center-right party, the Motherland Party (Anavatan Partisi, ANAP). Dalan was elected mayor of Greater Istanbul that was established as a metropolitan municipality on March 23, 1984. He served in this position from March 26, 1984 until March 28, 1989. During this time, he set up the principals of the metropolitan municipality system in Turkey, and invested in the infrastructure of the ever-expanding city of Istanbul such as the sewer system, transportation and recreation areas. The blue-eyed politician is best remembered for his promise "the waters of the Golden Horn will be the same color as my eyes". He served as deputy chairman of the World Local Governments Union and as president of the Organization of the Capitals and Cities of Islamic Countries and also of the World Metropolitans Union. He was listed on the United Nations Environment Programme's Global 500 Roll of Honour in 1987.

After losing his post to Nurettin Sözen, the candidate of the SHP in the regional elections of 1989, he founded his own party, the Democratic Center Party (Demokrat Merkez Partisi, DMP) on May 17, 1990, and became its leader. The DMP merged on September 14, 1991 with the right-wing, conservative party of Süleyman Demirel, the True Path Party (Doğru Yol Partisi, DYP). In the general elections held that year, he ran for membership of the parliament, and was elected deputy of Istanbul Province. After serving one term in parliament, he finally quit politics.

== Later career ==
Bedrettin Dalan worked as a top executive in business, and lectured at Marmara University and Istanbul Academy of Fine Arts. Dedicating himself to education, he founded İstanbul Eğitim ve Kültür Vakfı (İSTEK Vakfı), a foundation, which opened a number of prestigious private educational institutions in Istanbul such as primary and secondary schools, middle and high schools. In 1996, the foundation established a university in Istanbul, the Yeditepe University. Bedrettin Dalan acts as the president of the board of trustees of the foundation.

He is married to Ayseli Dalan and they have two sons, Barış and Altay Burak.

== Ergenekon trials ==
During excavations in Poyrazköy in Beykoz district, Istanbul that lasted from 21 to 28 April 2009 arms including 21 LAW arms, 14 hand grenades and 450 grams explosives were found. The discovery resulted in a separate court case known as the Poyrazköy case. The arms were found on the land of Dalan's Istek Foundation.

Dalan was charged in the Ergenekon trials, and the subject of an Interpol red notice as he was abroad at the time. In late 2011 Germany declined a request to extradite Dalan. In mid-2009 the accountant of Dalan's Yeditepe University left the country having emptied its accountants of TL5m. Prosecutors claim that Dalan was Ergenekon's "number three", and was one of the architects of the 1997 "post-modern coup".

== Bibliography ==
- Haliç. Neydi, Ne Oldu? (Golden Horn. What Was It? What Did It Become?)

Political offices
Preceded by Abdullah Tırtıl	Mayor of Istanbul; 1984–1989	Succeeded by Nurettin Sözen
