= Kadir Topbaş =

Turkish politician (1945–2021)

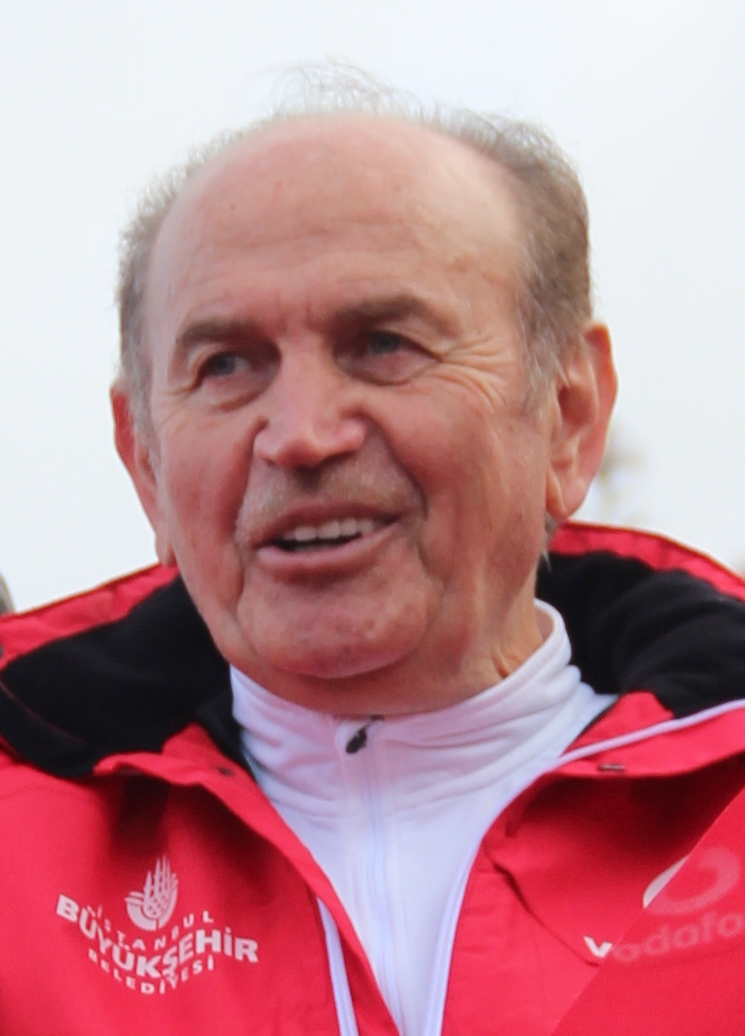

Mayor of Istanbul
- In office 28 March 2004 – 22 September 2017
- Preceded by: Ali Müfit Gürtuna
- Succeeded by: Mevlüt Uysal

Mayor of Beyoğlu
- In office 18 April 1999 – 28 March 2004
- Preceded by: Nusret Bayraktar
- Succeeded by: Ahmet Misbah Demircan

Personal details
- Born: 8 January 1945 Yusufeli, Artvin, Turkey
- Died: 13 February 2021 (aged 76) Istanbul, Turkey
- Party: Justice and Development Party (AKP)
- Spouse: Özleyiş Topbaş
- Children: 3
- Education: Istanbul University
- Awards: Bogwan Order of Cultural Merit (2014)

Kadir Topbaş (8 January 1945 – 13 February 2021) was a Turkish architect, businessman and politician who served as Mayor of Istanbul from 2004 to 2017.

== Biography ==
He was born on 8 January 1945, in Altıparmak village of Yusufeli district in Artvin Province. Kadir Topbaş moved to Istanbul in 1946 with his family. He earned a PhD in architectural history from Istanbul University following his education of theology at Marmara University in 1972 and architecture at Mimar Sinan University in 1974. After working as preacher in Edirne, teacher and freelance architect in İstanbul, he served between 1994 and 1998, as advisor to then-mayor of Istanbul Recep Tayyip Erdoğan for the restoration and decoration of palaces and other historical buildings in Istanbul.

Topbaş was also the owner of the Turkish cuisine restaurant chain, Saray Muhallebicisi.

== Political career ==
Topbaş entered politics as member of the religious oriented Milli Selamet Partisi (MSP). Later on, Topbaş ran twice for the deputy of Artvin province in the parliament, first in 1977 from the MSP and then in 1987 from Refah Partisi (RP) without success. In 1999, he was elected mayor of Beyoğlu district from the Fazilet Partisi (FP). In the 2004 regional elections, Kadir Topbaş ran for the post of mayor of İstanbul from the Adalet ve Kalkınma Partisi (AKP) and won on 28 March 2004. He became co-president of United Cities and Local Governments in November 2007 and was longlisted for the 2008 World Mayor award. Kadir Topbaş was re-elected as the mayor of İstanbul metropolitan area in 2009 Turkish general local elections, passing the runner-up Kemal Kılıçdaroğlu, former leader of Republican People's Party.

Topbaş was appointed President of the Union of Municipalities of Turkey in 2009. During the Gezi Park protests in mid-2013, he stressed that the redevelopment plans for Taksim Gezi Park were formulated straight from Recep Tayyip Erdoğan and not the municipal authorities. Topbaş subsequently made a commitment for better dialogue with the general public before urban development would occur, claiming that "we won’t even change a bus stop without asking local people first". He appeared to walk back on that commitment several days later, saying that it should not be taken literally and that the AKP had the final say. Topbaş's son-in-law was arrested in the aftermath of the 2016 Turkish coup d'état attempt, for supposed ties to Gülen movement. Because of this, Topbaş himself reportedly lost favour in the AKP, but he refused to quit the party. He stated his plan to carve out a separate burial space for soldiers who participated in the coup and name it "the graveyard for traitors".

Near the end of Topbaş's mayoral tenure in 2017, he vetoed five proposed municipal zoning plan changes. However, the vetoes were overridden by his fellow AKP members. He resigned as the mayor of Istanbul metropolitan area on 22 September 2017, without revealing a particular political reason. Mevlüt Uysal, the district mayor of Başakşehir since 2009, was elected as his successor by the Council of Istanbul Metropolitan Municipality on 28 September.

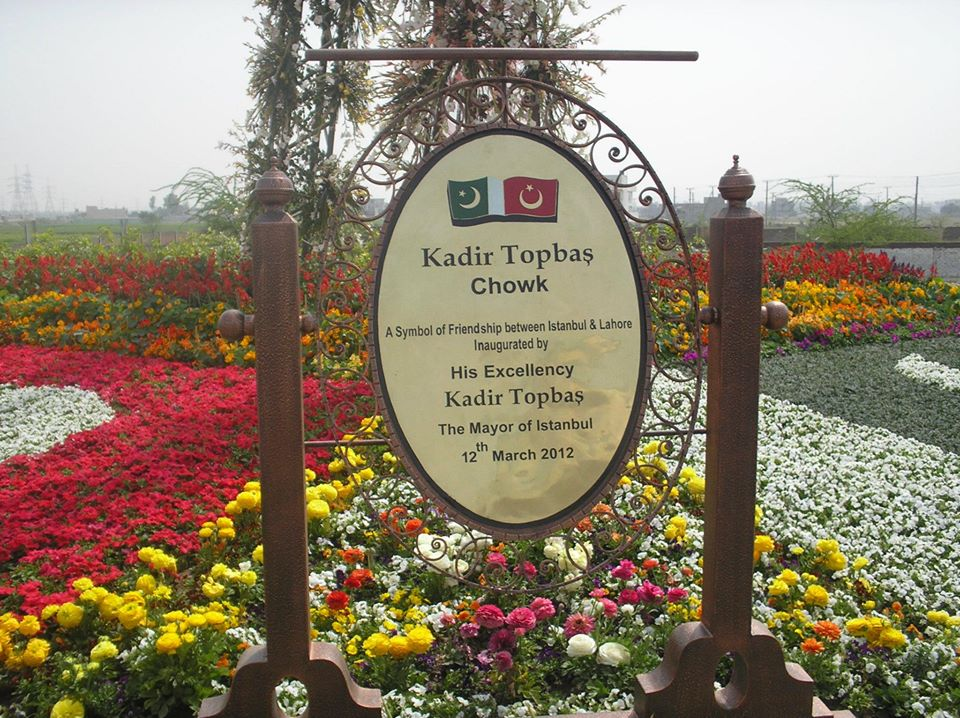
Kadir Topbaş Chowk in Lahore, Pakistan inaugurated by Kadir Topbaş, The Mayor of Istanbul (Turkey) on 12 March 2012

== Personal life and death ==
He was married and had two sons and a daughter.

In November 2020, Topbaş was hospitalized for COVID-19 during the COVID-19 pandemic in Turkey. He died on 13 February 2021, due to multiple organ failure amidst being treated for COVID-19 complications.

== Awards ==
Ribbon bar	Award or decoration	Country	Date	Place	Note	Ref.
	Order of Cultural Merit	South Korea	12 September 2014	Seoul		

Political offices
Preceded by Ali Müfit Gürtuna	Mayor of İstanbul; 28 March 2004 – 22 September 2017	Succeeded by Mevlüt Uysal
