= Ali Müfit Gürtuna =

Turkish mayor

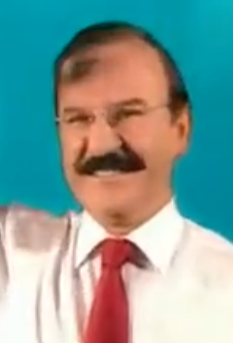
Gürtuna in 2016

Ali Müfit Gürtuna (born 1 June 1952) is a Turkish lawyer and politician, who was the mayor of Istanbul from 11 November 1998 to 1 April 2004.

== Political career ==
He started his political career at The Motherland Party, (Turkish: Anavatan Partisi, abbreviated as ANAP) in the beginning of the 1980s. He changed his side in 1994 by joining to the Welfare Party. His rise to success took place after this decision. He was appointed as the mayor of Istanbul in late 1998 and he was elected by popular vote on April 18, 1999. He is the first mayor in Turkey who has played musical instruments and placed importance in Arts.

When his term in the office ended, he gave up politics for two years until he returned to public eye by starting the Turkuaz Hareketi (Turquoise Movement) in 2006. He claimed that he formed an alliance from prominent politicians of Turkey from different political orientations to win the 2007 elections but they did not end up with standing for the election.

Political offices
Preceded by Recep Tayyip Erdoğan	Mayor of Istanbul; 1998–2004	Succeeded by Kadir Topbaş
