= Ahmet Vefik Alp =

Turkish architect (1948–2021)

- Born: 31 May 1948; Kadıköy, Istanbul
- Died: 10 January 2021 (aged 72)
- Education: Istanbul Technical University, Rice University
- Occupations: architect and urbanist

Ahmet Vefik Alp (31 May 1948 – 10 January 2021) was a Turkish architect and urbanist.

== Early life and education ==
Alp was born on 31 May 1948 in Kadıköy, Istanbul. He was a graduate of Lycée Saint-Joseph.

He obtained the degrees of architect and diplome architect in 1971 and 1973 from Istanbul Technical University with high honors. He was appointed as assistant professor of architecture in 1973.

In 1979, Alp received his master's degree and doctorate degrees from the School of Architecture at Rice University. His doctoral dissertation was entitled Aesthetic Response to Geometry in Architecture and focused to the domain of aesthetics and architectural / environmental psychology.

== Academia ==
In 1982, Alp was invited to the College of Environmental Design at King Fahd University, Riyadh, Saudi Arabia, where he taught for seven years. During that period, he designed the Turkish embassy and staff housing complex in the Riyadh diplomatic quarter and supervised its construction.

In 1985, Alp was appointed associate professor and in 1986 professor of the International Academy of Architecture, and in 1989 he became the founding president of their regional centre in Istanbul.

In 1996, Alp was appointed professor and chairman of the School of Architecture, Gebze Technical University, Istanbul.

== Career ==
In 1971, Alp became a licensed architect in Turkey. In 1984, he obtained registration in Texas as a 'Professional Architect' and became a member of the Texas Society of Architects. In 1986, Alp was accepted by the American Institute of Architects as a full member. In 1995, he was accepted as a professional interior architect by the Texas Board of Architectural Examiners. In 1994, Alp was licensed as city planner in Turkey.

In addition to Turkey and the Middle East, Alp worked in Switzerland and Japan. His projects included the Turkish Pavilion in Yamagata, Japan; the Mosque and Cultural Centre of Turkey, Tokyo; the Marina Park Residences, Istanbul; the Campus of the Gebze Institute of Technology near Istanbul; Historic Villas in Bosporus, Istanbul; International Tourism Trade Centre, Istanbul; Office Structures & Shopping Malls in Anatolia, Hilton Hotel and Shopping Complex in Kayseri; Political Party headquarters, Ankara; Hotel and Mall, Istanbul; Residences and Mall, Istanbul and İzmir and Malatya City Hall, Turkey.

Alp served as chief advisor to the Prime Minister of Turkey from 1999 to 2002. The Presidium of the International Academy of Architecture bestowed the distinguished title of Academician upon him in 2000.

In 1994, 1999, 2004 and 2009, Alp ran unsuccessfully for the Metropolitan Mayor of Greater Istanbul. His proposals for the restoration of the disturbed ecology, history and urbanism of Istanbul received wide attention. Alp visited over 40 nations and spoke fluent English and French. At the time of his death, he led Alp Architects and Planners Ltd in Istanbul, headed the Istanbul Center of the International Academy of Architecture and conducted design studios at Yeditepe University, Turkey.

== Death ==
He died on 10 January 2021 in Istanbul due to a heart attack.

== Awards ==
In 2001 he was conferred the title of Honorable Member of the Kazgor Design Academy, Kazakhstan, and was elected as Member of the International Academy of Architecture for Eastern Countries.

Alp was the recipient of the European Property Awards 2011 for his plans of ‘Malatya City Hall’ and ‘MHP Political Party HQS’, both in Turkey. The latter has been selected the ‘Best Public Service Building of Europe’ to compete for the ‘World’s Best’ title later this year.
