= Yeditepe University =

University in İstanbul, Turkey

- Yeditepe Üniversitesi
- Motto: Atatürk Rönesansını Devam Ettiren Üniversite
- Motto in English: The university which continues the renaissance of Atatürk
- Type: Private (Non-profit)
- Established: 1996; 30 years ago
- President: Bedrettin Dalan
- Rector: Prof. Dr. Mehmet Durman
- Location: Istanbul, Turkey; 40°58′22″N 29°09′07″E
- Campus: 26 Ağustos Campus
- Language: English
- Founder: Istanbul Education and Culture Foundation (Turkish: İSTEK Vakfı)
- Nickname: Yeditepe Eagles
- Mascot: Eagle
- Website: www.yeditepe.edu.tr

University rankings

Regional – Overall
- QS Emerging Europe and Central Asia: 251-300 (2022)

Yeditepe University (Turkish: Yeditepe Üniversitesi) is a private non-profit university situated in Istanbul, Turkey. Established by the Istanbul Education and Culture Foundation (Turkish: İstanbul Eğitim ve Kültür Vakfı, İSTEK Vakfı) in 1996, Yeditepe University now claims to be the largest of the 74 private non-profit universities in Turkey. Students pay fees that vary according to discipline and faculty.

== History ==
The university was established in 1996 by the Istanbul Education and Culture Foundation (Turkish: İSTEK Vakfı) which seeks to promote educational opportunities on a non-profit basis. It is financially independent of the Turkish Government Treasury Department, not subject to any significant external financial controls or constraints, and receives no income from the state.

== Campus ==
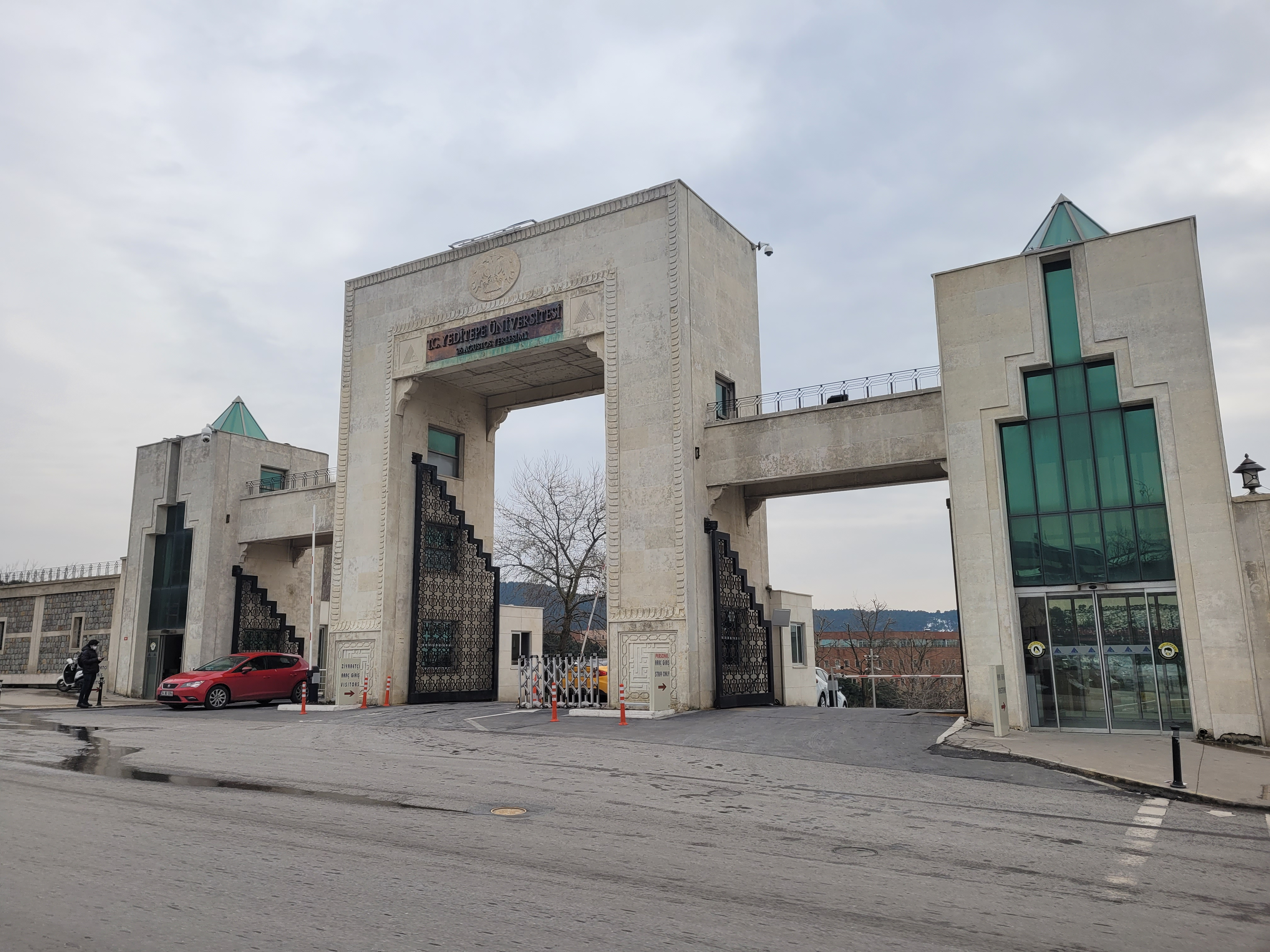
The entrance gate of Yeditepe University's August 26th Campus

Yeditepe University is principally located in a purpose-built campus at Kayışdağı on the Asian side of Istanbul. However, the Faculty of Dentistry and the University Hospital are located in other locations on the Asian side of the city. The campus consists of 236,000 m^{2} of built space, and 125,000 m^{2} or open space. It has 319 classrooms, 22 lecture halls, 32 computer labs, and 74 professional labs for the Fine Arts, Architecture, Communication, Engineering and Sciences Faculties and 2 professional photographic studios.

There are 34 academic administration units, 287 Faculty Offices, 28 student club rooms, a 3000 m^{2} Central Library equipped with computers with internet access and private reading areas, Residence Halls with a capacity for 1400 people, a multipurpose Conference Hall with a 1200-person seating capacity, a Cinema Complex with a 100-person seating capacity each, a Theatre Hall with a 100 seating capacity, a 524 square meter and 384 square meter professionally equipped two television studios and 200 m^{2} educational TV studio lab, 150 m^{2} educational radio facilities, 550 m^{2} indoor basketball court with seating facilities, and outdoor basketball courts, outdoor volleyball and tennis courts, indoor and outdoor half Olympic sized swimming pools, 300 m^{2} fully equipped fitness and aerobics center, 783 m^{2} modern shopping complex, and large grassy areas with benches and picnic facilities. Parking is in 400 vehicle capacity indoor lots.

The August 26th Campus has a unique architecture feel, inspired by styles of the Seljuk Empire. The main entrance is 22 meters high, opening to a lit courtyard reminiscent of Seljuk architecture. Buildings are covered in Anatolian stone. The symbol of the university is a double-headed eagle, representing men and women. This symbol is present in the main entrance of the campus and repeated elsewhere.

== Organization ==
All academic programs are offered in English except for a program in political science and international relations in French, a program in business administration and vocational school programs in German, a program in Turkish language and literature in Turkish and a program in Russian language and literature in Russian.

Currently, Yeditepe University is a signatory to student exchange protocols and memoranda of understanding with over 30 universities in the United States and is actively involved with developing the Erasmus and Socrates Program with European institutions of higher education. Yeditepe has signed an educational affiliation agreement with the International University in Geneva.

Yeditepe University comprises eleven faculties, three graduate institutes and one vocational school of higher education.

=== Faculties ===
- Faculty of Architecture
- Faculty of Arts and Sciences
- Department of Mathematics
- Faculty of Commerce
- Faculty of Communications
- Faculty of Dentistry
- Faculty of Economics and Administration Sciences
- Faculty of Education
- Faculty of Engineering
- Faculty of Fine Arts
- Faculty of Health Sciences
- Faculty of Law
- Faculty of Medicine
- Faculty of Pharmacy

=== Graduate Institutes ===
- Institute of Graduate Studies in Science and Engineering
- Institute of Health Graduate Studies
- Institute of Social Sciences Graduate Studies

=== Vocational Schools of Higher Education ===
- School for Advanced Vocational Studies
- School of Applied Sciences

== Students and faculty ==
The total student population has reached over 20,000 by 2010. Of these, 20% are students enrolled in graduate programs. The teaching staff comprises about 1,350 lecturers of which over two-thirds are full-time faculty members. The current Rector of Yeditepe University is Prof. Dr. Mehmet Durman.

== See also ==
- List of universities in Turkey
