= Aydın (name) =

Name list

- Gender: Male

Origin
- Meaning: Enlightened, bright, intellectual, faith

Other names
- Variant forms: Ajdin, Aiden, Aydin, Aydan

Aydın (pronounced [ˈajdɯn]), also spelled Ajdin, Aiden, Ayden, Aydin, or Aydan, is a male given name.

In Turkic languages, the name means 'enlightened' and 'bright'; it is also commonly used for intellectuals.

In the Balkans, the variant Ajdin is popular among Bosniaks in the former Yugoslav nations.

== Given name ==
=== Aydın ===
- Aydın Boysan (1921–2018), Turkish architect, academic, author and essayist.
- Aydın Dikmen (1937–2020), Turkish art dealer
- Aydın Doğan (born 1936), Turkish entrepreneur, founder of Doğan Holding
- Aydın Güven Gürkan (1941–2006), Turkish academic and politician
- Aydın Karabulut (born 1988), Turkish-German footballer
- Aydın Kurtoğlu (born 1983), Turkish composer, singer, and songwriter
- Aydın Örs (born 1946), Turkish basketball coach
- Aydın Sayılı (1913–1993), Turkish historian
- Aydın Adnan Sezgin (born 1956), Turkish diplomat and politician
- Aydın Toscalı (born 1980), Turkish footballer
- Aydın Yelken (1939–2022), Turkish footballer
- Aydın Yılmaz (born 1988), Turkish footballer

=== Aydin ===
- Aydin Aghdashloo (born 1940), Iranian-Azerbaijani painter
- Aydin Balayev (1956–2021), Azerbaijani historian, ethnologist, and professor
- Aydin Mirzazade (born 1957), Azerbaijani politician
- Aydin Rajabov (born 1944), Azerbaijani artist
- Aydin Suleymanli (born 2005), Azerbaijani chess grandmaster

=== Ajdin ===
- Ajdin Draga (1864–1914), Albanian politician
- Ajdin Hasić (born 2001), Bosnian footballer
- Ajdin Hrustic (born 1996), Australian footballer
- Ajdin Maksumić (born 1985), Bosnian footballer
- Ajdin Muzaka (died 1445), Albanian military commander
- Ajdin Nukić (born 1997), Bosnian footballer
- Ajdin Penava (born 1997), Bosnian basketball player
- Ajdin Redžić, Bosnian-Herzegovinian football midfielder

== Surname ==
=== Aydın ===
- Aras Aydın (born 1989), Turkish actor
- Bahtiyar Aydın (1946–1993), Turkish army general
- Bilgesu Aydın (born 1994), Turkish football player
- Ebru Aydın (born 1973), Turkish singer and songwriter
- Elif Sıla Aydın (born 1996), Turkish handball player
- Emre Aydın (born 1981), Turkish rock singer-songwriter
- Eren Aydın (born 1982), Turkish footballer
- Furkan Aydın (born 1991), Turkish footballer
- Hüseyin Kenan Aydin (1962-2026), German-Turkish politician
- Lütfiye Aydın (born 1949), Turkish writer
- Mehmet Aydın (born 1943), Turkish professor of philosophy and religion
- Merve Aydın (born 1990), Turkish athlete
- Merve Aydın (basketball) (born 1994), Turkish basketball player
- Mirkan Aydın (born 1987), German-Turkish footballer
- Mustafa Aydın (born 1967), Turkish professor of International relations
- Okan Aydın (born 1994), Turkish-German footballer
- Selçuk Aydın (born 1983), Turkish boxer
- Sevim Aydin, German politician
- Vahide Aydın (born 1968), Austrian-Turkish politician and social worker
- Yiğit Caner Aydın (born 1992), Turkish para archer

=== Aydin ===
- Archen Aydin (born 2001), Thai actor

== See also ==
- Aidan (name)
- Aidin (name)
- Ayten (disambiguation)
