= Lütfiye =

Lütfiye may refer to:

- Lütfiye, İnegöl
- Lütfiye, Kestel
- Lütfiye, Kütahya, a village in the Merkez (Central) district of Kütahya Province, Turkey
- Lütfiye (name), a given name
