= BMZ =

BMZ may refer to:

- Federal Ministry for Economic Cooperation and Development (German: Bundesministerium für wirtschaftliche Zusammenarbeit und Entwicklung)
- BMZ Group, a Turkish shipping company
- BMZ (German company), an electric-vehicle-battery manufacturer
- Bryansk Machine-Building Plant (Russian: Брянский машиностроительный завод, "БМЗ"), in Bryansk, Russia
- Byelorussian Steel Works (Russian: Белорусский металлургический завод, Belarusian: Беларускі металургічны завод, "БМЗ"), in Zhlobin, Belarus
- BMZ Broadcasting, LLC, owner of Florida radio station WJNX-FM
- bmz, ISO 639 code of the Baramu language
