= Lütfiye (name) =

Lütfiye, Lutfiya, or Lotfia is a feminine given name of Arabic origin. It is also a Turkish feminine given name. Notable people with the name include:

== Given name ==
=== Lotfia ===
- Lotfia Elnadi (1907–2002), Egyptian pilot

=== Lutfiya ===
- Lutfiya al-Dulaimi (1939–2026), Iraqi writer and activist
- Lutfiya al-Qaba'ili (born 1948), Libyan journalist and writer

=== Lütfiye ===
- Lütfiye Aydın (born 1949), Turkish writer
- Lütfiye Ercimen (born 1987), Turkish football player
- Lütfiye Özdağ, Turkish para taekwondo practitioner
- Lütfiye Sultan (1910–1997), Ottoman princess
