= Aftermath of the 2023 Turkey–Syria earthquakes =

Following the 2023 Turkey–Syria earthquakes, numerous issues were presented to people involved. Multiple agencies submitted figures on life and monetary losses, even while search and rescue operations were still underway. Organizations of different varieties campaigned for donations and the Turkish government pledged to supply renters and homeowners with financial aid and promises to rebuild. Other pressing issues while the region was in recovery mode were a rocket attack, crime, flooding, and a tornado.

== Estimations of losses ==
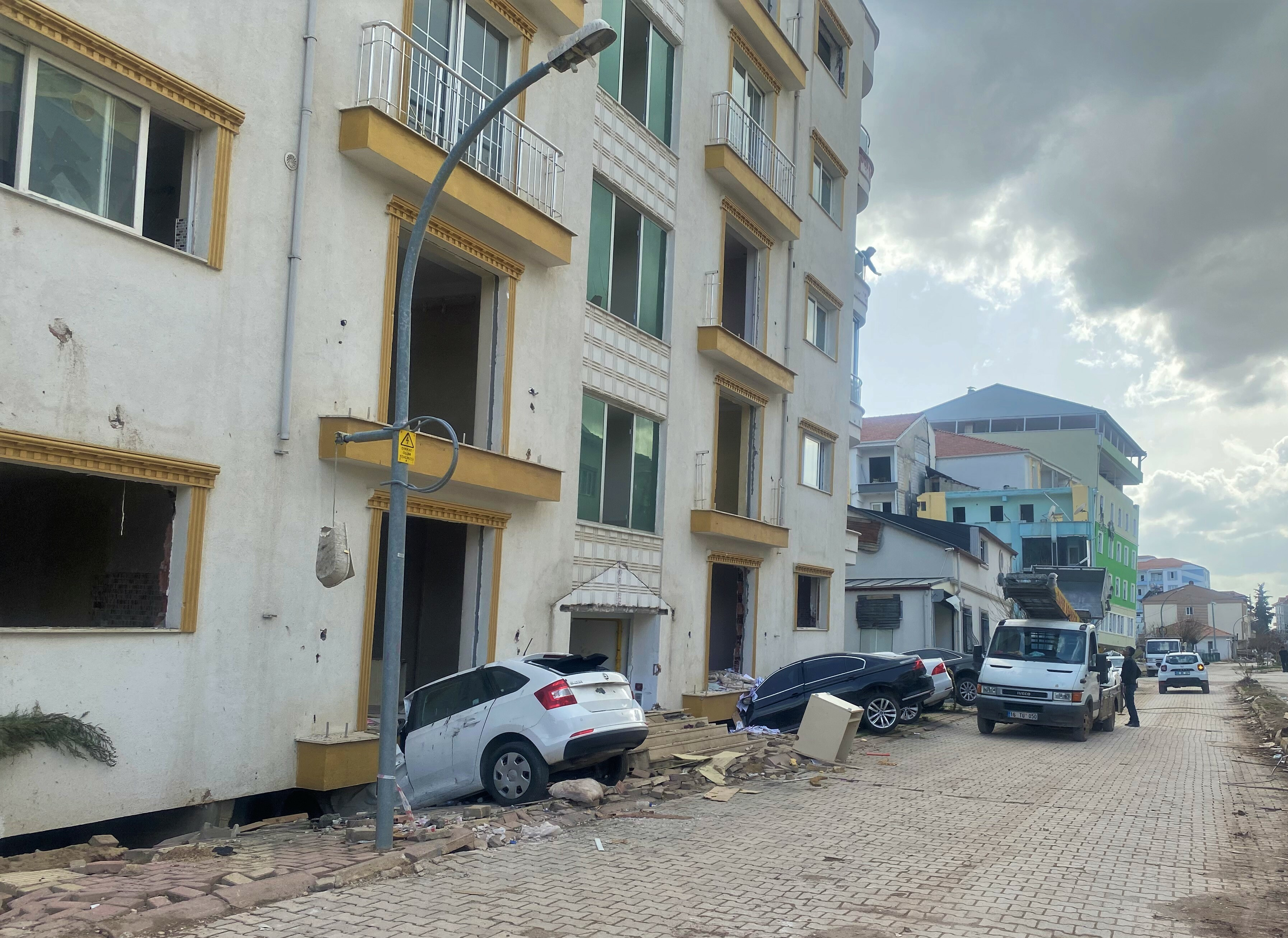
Cars under a heavily damaged building in Adıyaman Province

The USGS Prompt Assessment of Global Earthquakes for Response (PAGER) service estimated a 35 percent probability of economic losses between US$10 billion and US$100 billion. There was a 34 percent probability of economic losses exceeding US$100 billion. The service estimated a 36 percent probability of deaths between 10,000 and 100,000; 26 percent probability of deaths exceeding 100,000. For the second large earthquake, there was a 46 percent probability of deaths between 1,000 and 10,000; 30 percent probability of deaths between 100 and 1,000. The service also estimated a 35 percent probability of economic losses between US$1 billion and US$10 billion; 27 percent probability of economic losses between US$10 billion and US$100 billion.

On 11 February, when the death toll was reported at about 28,000, United Nations emergency relief coordinator Martin Griffiths said he expected it to "more than double". The World Health Organization said up to 26 million people may have been affected; 15 million in Turkey and 11 million in Syria.

Immediately after the earthquakes the Turkish lira value struck a record low of 18.85 against the US dollar, but rebounded to its starting position at the end of the day. Turkish stock markets fell; main equities benchmark fell as much as 5 percent and banks fell 5.5 percent but recovered from the losses. The country's main stock market dropped 1.35 percent on 6 February. The Borsa Istanbul fell 8.6 percent on 7 February, and declined by more than 7 percent on the morning of 8 February before trading was suspended; the exchange then announced it would close for five days. When the exchange reopened, Turkey's stock soared nearly 10 percent while the lira fell to a record low of 18.9010 against the dollar. Total cost of earthquake damage in Turkey was estimated by TÜRKONFED at $84.1 billion US dollars; $70.75 billion on rebuilding, $10.4 billion loss in national income, and an additional $2.91 billion loss in workforce. Turkish president Recep Tayyip Erdogan said rebuilding would cost $105 billion. The European Bank for Reconstruction and Development said potential losses may be up to 1 percent of Turkey's GDP in 2023. The Turkish government released a preliminary report estimating the total damage cost at $103.6 billion; corresponding to 9 percent of its GDP in 2023. About half of residential property in the affected area is thought to be covered by Compulsory Earthquake Insurance.

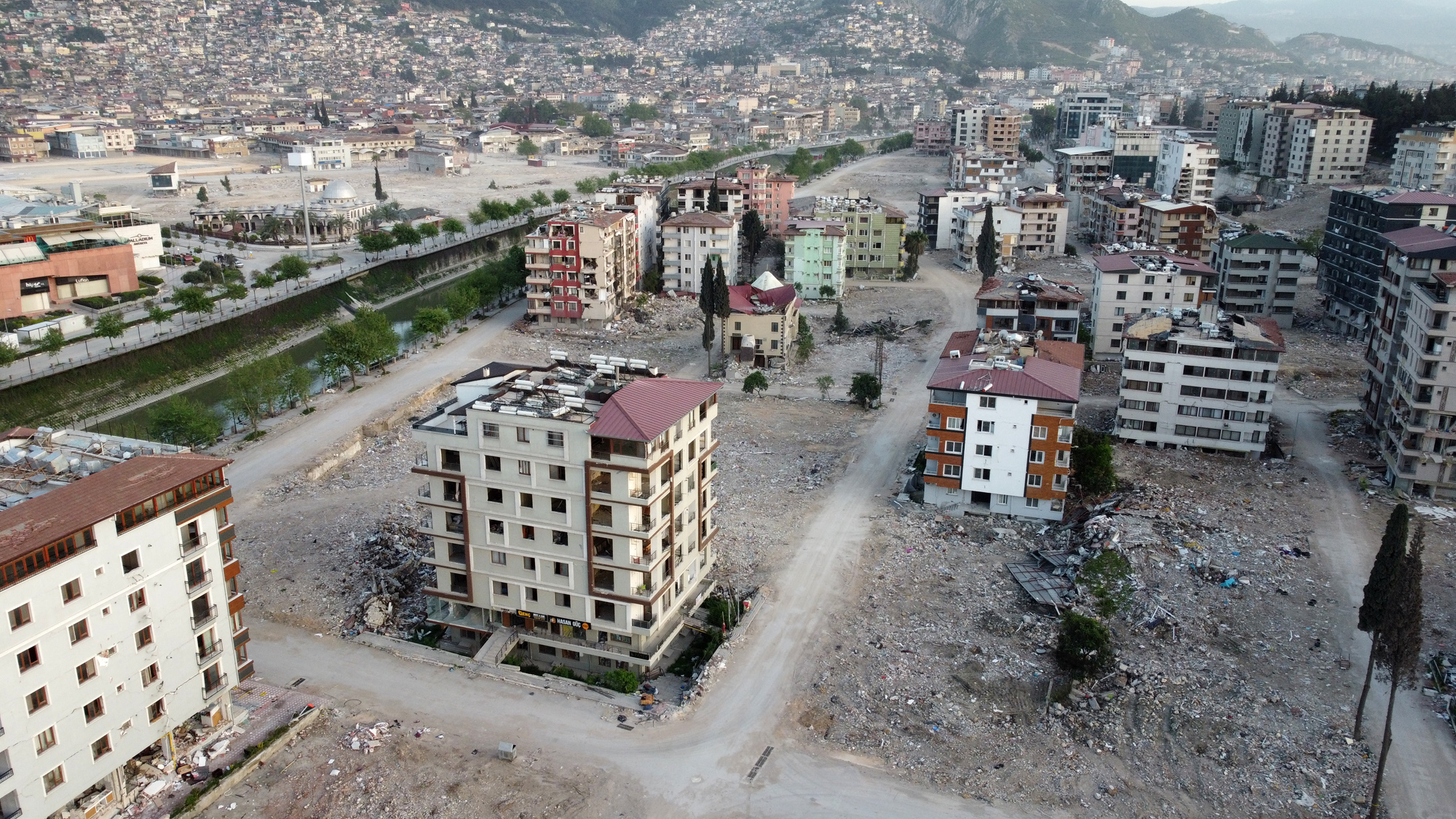
Empty plots of land in Antakya after debris clean-up

The United Nations Development Programme estimated between 116 million and 210 million tons of debris must be cleared in Turkey. The volume of building debris was estimated at 100 million m^{3} (3.5 billion cu ft); greater than any recent natural disaster. The amount is 10 times that produced during the 2010 Haiti earthquake.

In Syria, the World Bank estimated $5.1 billion in damages, excluding economic impact and losses. Nearly half the cost was direct damage to residential buildings and 18 percent on infrastructure. The amount of destroyed or damaged capital stock was about 10 percent of Syria's GDP. The World Bank estimated the reconstruction cost at $7.9 billion, additionally the economy may contract by up to 5.5 percent in 2023.

== Turkey ==
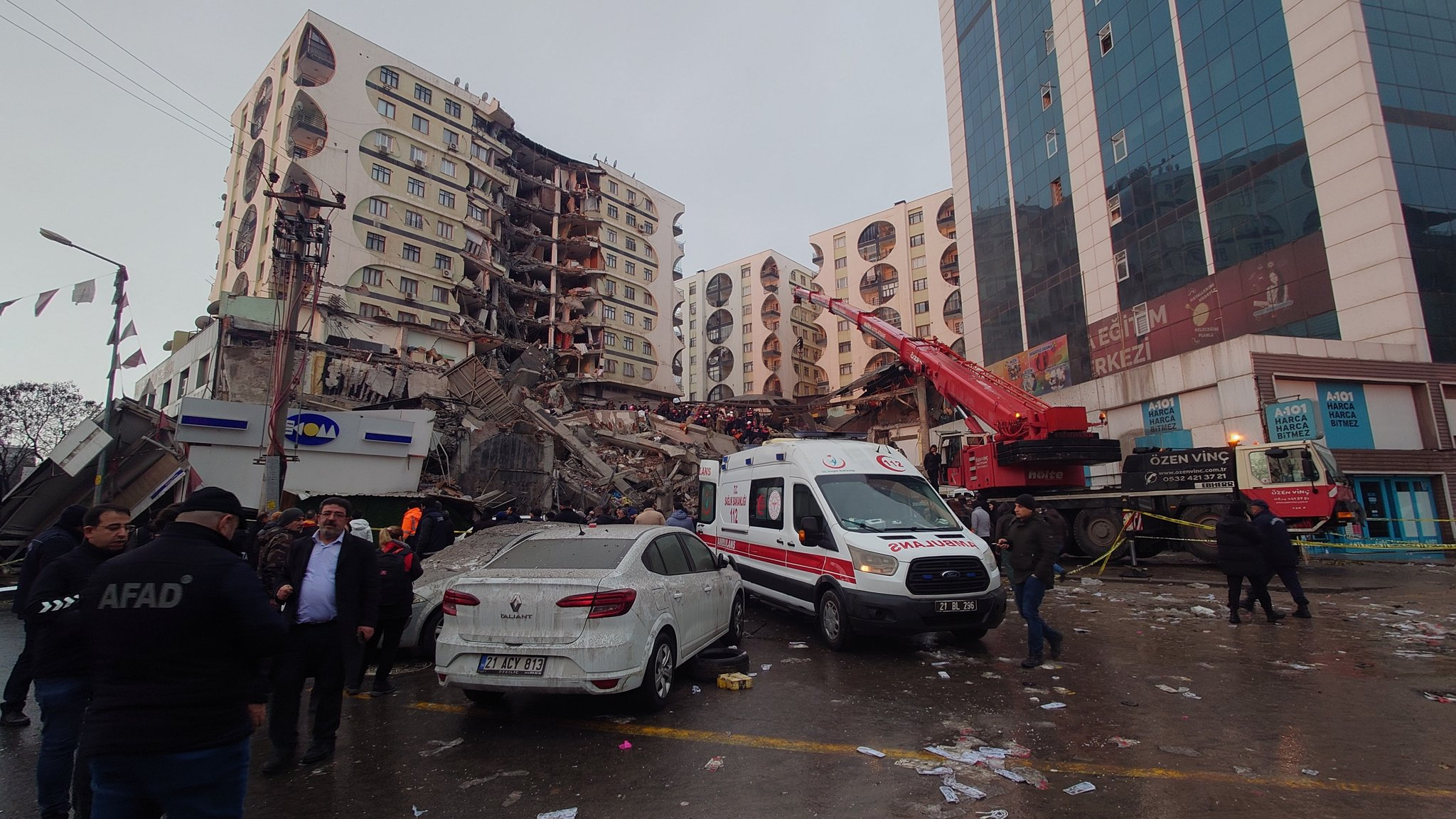
Rescue work at the destroyed Galeria Business Center in Diyarbakır. One of the buildings in the background later collapsed following an aftershock.

In the immediate aftermath, thousands were trapped under rubble when buildings collapsed. Many people were missing in collapsed buildings. Survivors trapped under rubble livestreamed their pleas for help on social media. Some trapped survivors shared their location on social media which allowed rescuers to reach them. People who lost contact with their relatives also sent pleas on social media. Several tens of thousands of people across the region were left homeless and spent the night in cold weather. Officials had plans to open hotels in Antalya, Alanya and Mersin to temporarily accommodate the affected population. Authorities were slammed by residents in Hatay Province, who criticized the insufficient search and rescue efforts. Hatay Airport's runway was heavily damaged, making rescue efforts challenging. On 7 February, authorities said 1,846 people in the province have been rescued.

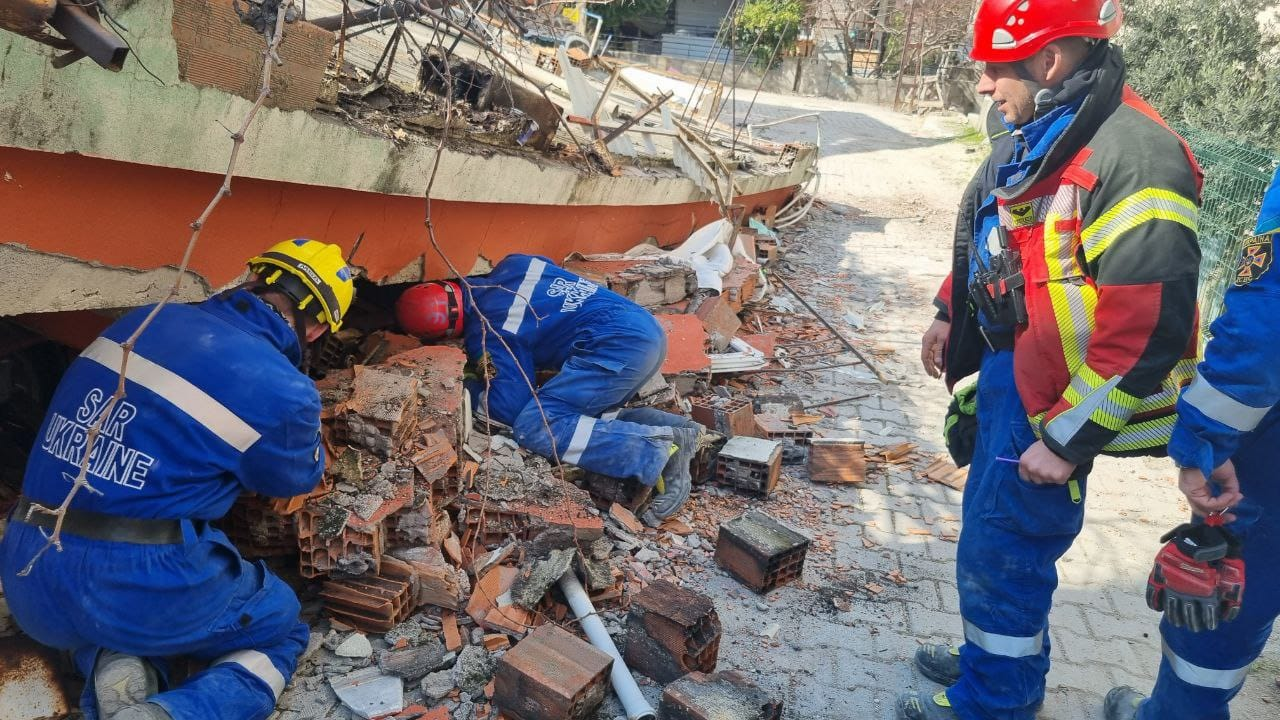
Ukrainian search and rescue team in Hatay

Mosques in Turkey were used as shelters for people unable to return to their homes amid freezing temperatures. In Gaziantep, people sought refuge in shopping malls, stadiums, community centers, and mosques. Nearly 250,000 displaced persons resided in schools across Malatya Province. At least 24 mobile kitchens from vocational schools in the province were distributed across the affected areas.

Several Turkish humanitarian institutions such as Ahbap from Haluk Levent, the Turkish Philanthropy Funds (US-based), and Turkish Red Crescent (besides other IFRC members around the world) also launched emergency appeals to help the victims.

Turkish Airlines said it would provide free flights from the provinces of Adana, Adıyaman, Gaziantep, Kayseri, Diyarbakır, Şanlıurfa, Malatya, Elazığ and Kahramanmaraş. The Disaster and Emergency Management Authority opened an invitation for citizen volunteers to help with rescue efforts in the affected area. Thousands of volunteers arrived at Istanbul Airport. Bilal Ekşi, CEO of Turkish Airlines, said it has flown 11,780 volunteers on 80 flights to Adana, Gaziantep, Adiyaman and Şanlıurfa. Pegasus Airlines said it evacuated 30,771 people from the affected area on 169 flights between 6 and 9 February. Between 6 and 11 February, Turkish Airlines said it evacuated 139,438 people from the affected area on 790 flights. It carried 7,833 members of search and rescue and aid groups to the affected area on 1,595 flights.

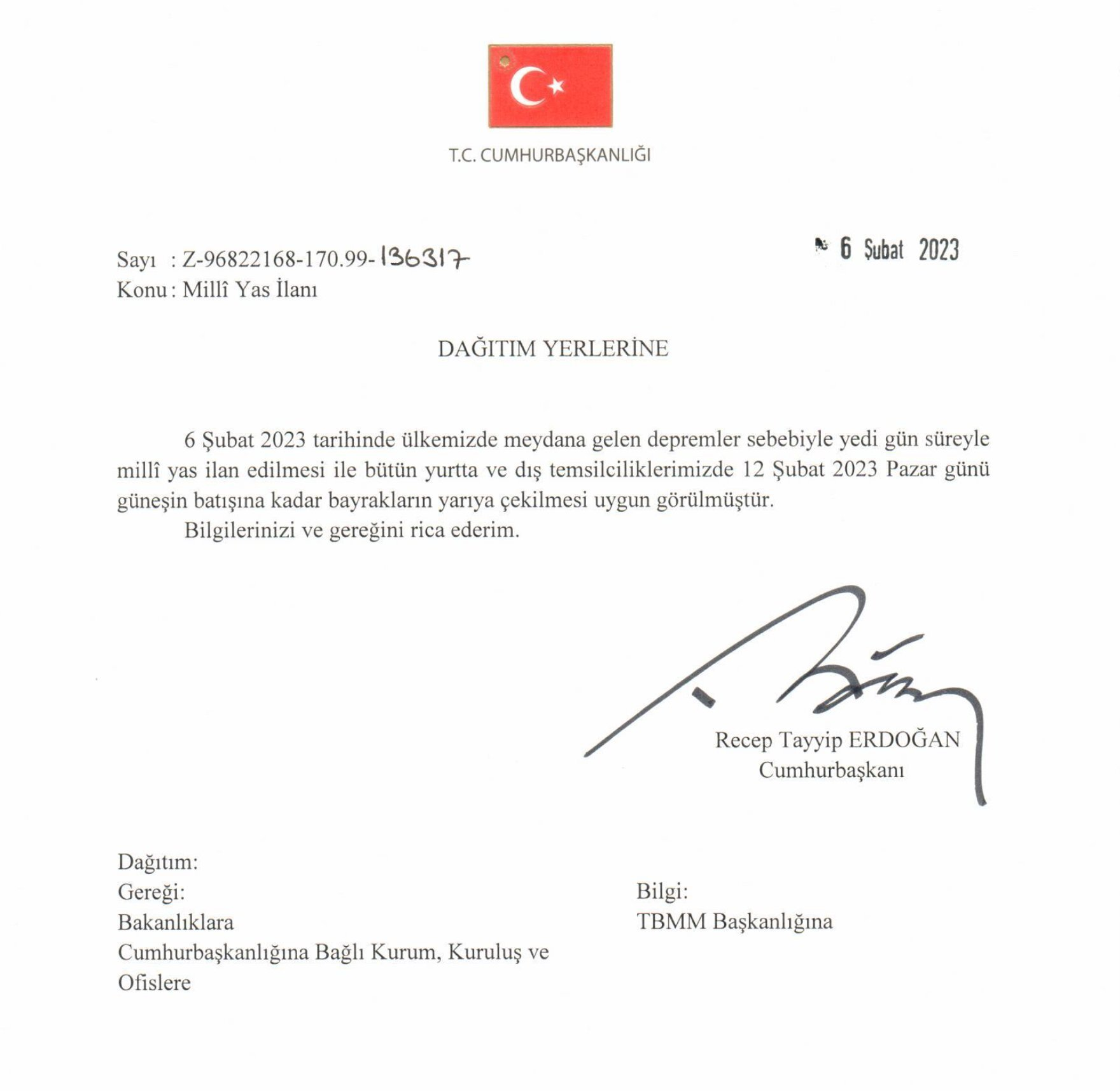
President's national mourning decision

=== Search and rescue ===
President Recep Tayyip Erdoğan said on Twitter, "search and rescue teams were immediately dispatched" to the affected area. Interior Minister Süleyman Soylu urged residents to refrain from entering damaged buildings. On 7 February, President Erdoğan declared a 3-month state of emergency in the 10 affected provinces: Adana, Hatay, Osmaniye, Kahramanmaraş, Gaziantep, Kilis, Şanlıurfa, Adıyaman, Malatya and Diyarbakır.

The national government declared a level four alert to appeal for international aid. According to the Disaster and Emergency Management Presidency, 25,000 search and rescue personnel were dispatched to the 10 affected provinces. At least 70 countries offered to help in search and rescue operations.

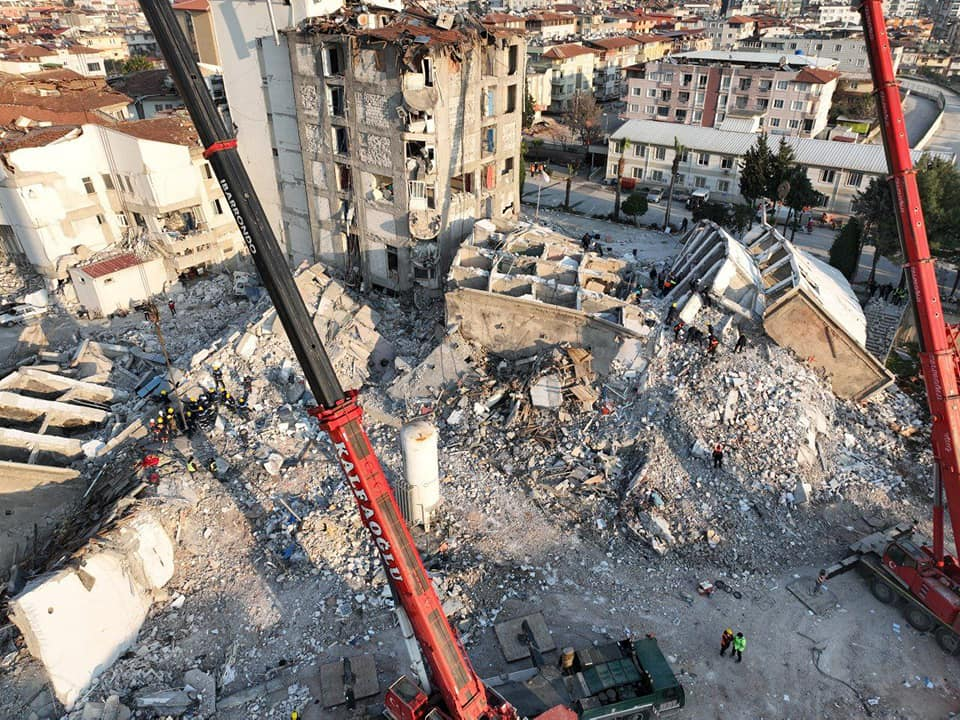
Emergency Service of Ukraine in Hatay Province

Emergency services in Turkey were activated and looked for survivors trapped under many collapsed buildings. By 8 February, more than 8,000 people were rescued from rubble across 10 provinces. About 380,000 individuals took refuge at relief shelters or hotels.

An "air aid corridor" was established by the Turkish Armed Forces to mobilize search and rescue teams. Many military aircraft including an Airbus A400M and C-130 Hercules planes transported search and rescue teams and vehicles to the area. Food, blankets and psychological teams were also sent. Turkey sent an official request to NATO and allies for assistance.

Over 53,000 Turkish emergency workers were deployed to the regions affected from the earthquakes. A team of 90 miners from Soma arrived at Osmaniye to provide assistance. The İzmir Metropolitan Municipality also sent dozens of vehicles and equipment.

Poor weather conditions including snow, rain and freezing temperatures disrupted search and rescue efforts undertaken by rescue workers and civilians. Rescuers and volunteers wore winter clothing while searching for survivors. Damaged roads also slowed down aid delivery.

On 8 February, Erdoğan visited the town of Pazarcık, Kahramanmaraş Province and Hatay Province. He acknowledged "shortcomings" in the response to the earthquake, but denied that there was an insufficient number of personnel involved in rescue operations. He also described people saying they hadn't seen security forces at all in some areas as "provocateurs".

AFAD announced on 19 February that search and rescue efforts in most of the affected provinces had ceased. The chairperson of AFAD, Yunus Sezer, said efforts would largely be discontinued by the night of 19 February. Operations were still ongoing for 40 buildings in Kahramanmaraş and Hatay provinces by 19 February.

=== Charity and volunteer campaigns ===
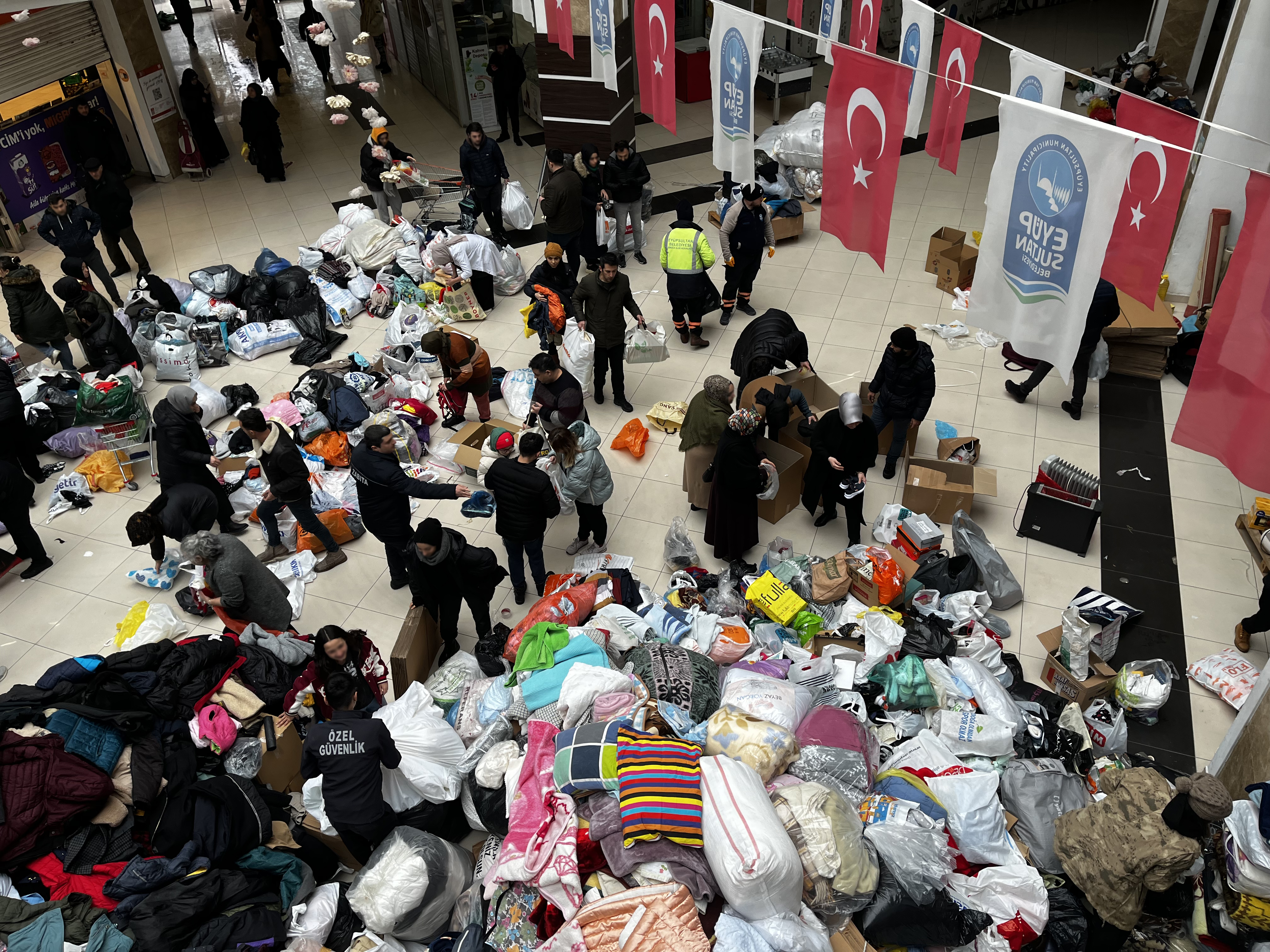
Aid collection in Istanbul

President of the Turkish Red Crescent, Kerem Kınık, said the national blood stock may not be sufficient and made an appeal on social media urging people to donate blood across the country. On 7 February, many search and rescue teams from various cities, many from Istanbul, and AFAD volunteers reached the affected areas. At Istanbul, 12,752 volunteers were flown on 73 flights to the region by 06:00. By 11 February, there were over 159,000 volunteer and professional search and rescue personnel in the affected area.

Eight of Turkey's most-watched television channels organized a joint broadcast of an aid campaign. The channels; ATV, FOX, Kanal D, Kanal 7, Show TV, Star TV, TRT 1 and TV8 ortak organized the Türkiye Beats with One Heart Campaign on 15 February. The broadcast was featured on 213 television channels and 562 radio stations. The campaign received $6.1 billion in donations; the Central Bank of the Republic of Turkey was the largest donor, pledging $1.6 billion. Ziraat Bank and VakıfBank each pledged $1 billion. The Ministry of Youth and Sports, Turkish Football Federation, Super League Clubs Association Foundation and beIN Media Group organized the Omuz Omuza campaign which raised $44.8 million on the first day.

=== Government assistance ===
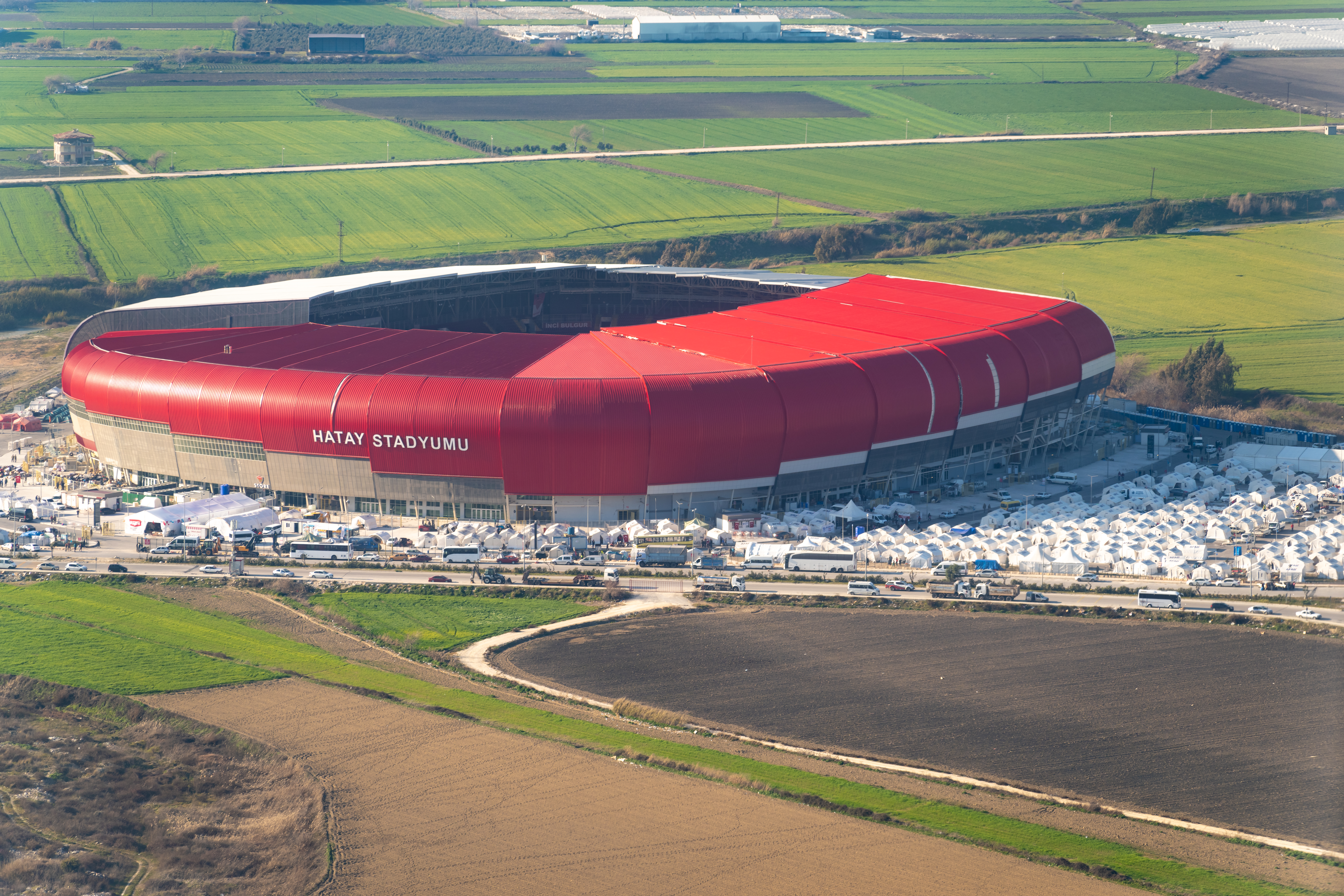
Relief center at Hatay Stadium

The government said it would pay compensation to those who have lost their homes. President Erdoğan said ₺15,000 in relocation assistance per household would be given to those whose homes were moderate, heavy or total destruction. Rent assistance of up to ₺5,000 would be given to homeowners and ₺2,000 to tenants.

On 9 February, after touring the city of Gaziantep, Erdoğan promised to rebuild destroyed homes of survivors within one year. He also said the government is working on temporary accommodation for those made homeless. That same day, force majeure was imposed in the affected region and tax obligations between 6 February and 31 July 2023, were postponed until 31 July 2023.

On 10 February, while touring Adıyaman Province, Erdoğan reiterated the promise to rebuild all homes within one year, and added that the government will subsidize rents for those unwilling to stay in tents. He later added that more than 141,000 rescue personnel, including foreign teams, were working in the 10 affected provinces, that 100 billion lira (US$5.3 billion) were allocated to the disaster response. On 22 February, the Turkish government announced plans to construct 200,000 homes in the 11 affected provinces and a further 70,000 in villages.

Over 1.9 million people were rehoused in dormitories, guest houses, tents, hotels and containers. AFAD issued a statement on 16 February, detailing that 387,000 tents had been established in the affected area by local and international organizations. Erdoğan said 890,000 survivors were placed in dormitories and 50,000 in hotels. He added that 1.6 million people had access to shelter. Across the affected region, 162 container cities were established. The governor of Şırnak, Osman Bilgin, said the district would be demolished and reconstructed.

On 22 April, at an opening ceremony for new homes in Gaziantep, Erdoğan said construction had begun for 105,000—more than half had been completed. He added that the government was constructing 507,000 houses and 143,000 village homes; 319,000 homes were planned for completion by the end of 2023. New facilities including schools, hospitals, bazaars, markets, green areas, and parks were also being built. About 689,000 people continue to live in container homes one year after the earthquake. These containers, generally 21 m^{2} (230 sq ft), are equipped with amenities such as running water, a shower and toilet.

=== Incidents ===
On the morning of 7 February, Turkey accused the People's Defense Units of having overseen an MRL attack on its border checkpoint, and that the Turkish army responded with further attacks.

The Kurdistan Workers' Party (PKK) declared a ceasefire in its conflict with Turkey. Co-founder of the PKK, Cemîl Bayik, said "thousands of our people are under the rubble" and pushed for the focus on recovery efforts. He requested for all groups engaged to stop military actions and added that the PKK would not be engaged "as long as the Turkish state does not attack".

On 17 February, a Syrian family of seven, including five children, were killed during a fire that struck a home in Nurdağı, Turkey, in which they moved to after surviving the earthquake. Seven other people were injured during the fire. A natural gas explosion at a building in Şanlıurfa on 20 February killed two, left five injured and damaged businesses. Şanlıurfa's governor, Salih Ayhan, said due to the earthquakes, gas supply to the city was cut and an investigation was ongoing. A bus ferrying earthquake survivors from Hatay to Konya collided with a truck on the Tarsus-Adana-Gaziantep Motorway on 23 February, killing two and injuring six.

On 20 April, an IF1 tornado struck a camp housing people affected by the earthquake in Pazarcık, Kahramanmaraş; three people died and 50 others were injured.

=== Crime and conflict ===
After the earthquakes, looting was observed in the affected provinces. In Hatay, some desperate survivors trespassed into supermarkets for food when aid took too long to arrive. However, ATMs were also broken-in and emptied; looters also began ravaging through clothing and electronic stores. President Erdogan said on 11 February that serious actions would be taken to address the issue. A rescuer in the affected area said many looters carried knives with them. Looting occurred at damaged shops and buildings. Videos also circulated online allegedly showing goods stolen from aid vehicles, looting at buildings and alleged looters being beaten by officials or crowds. On 11 February, Anadolu Agency, citing unnamed sources, said Turkish officials arrested 98 people and seized stolen goods. In Hatay Province, 42 people were held for stealing cash, smartphones, computers, weaponries, jewellery and bank cards. Authorities also arrested six people for cheating a survivor in Gaziantep.

Turkey's Human Rights Association recorded several instances of violence and torture against alleged looters in Hatay Province. In one instance, a person died while in custody of officials after he was arrested in Hatay's Altinözü District alongside his brother. The surviving brother said he had been tortured. The siblings' father who identified the body said the victim died from a blood clot and had broken ribs and a broken nose. There were many reports of people mistaken as looters and violently beaten, including the beating of volunteer rescuers. A video which showed the lynching of three alleged refugees was posted on Twitter.

German and Austrian rescuers deployed to Hatay suspended operations, citing a worsening security situation due to the slow arrival of aid or sporadic clashes between armed groups. The teams later resumed operations when the Turkish Land Forces provided protection. On 12 February, rescuers from the Israeli search-and-rescue group United Hatzalah left Turkey, citing "intelligence of a concrete and immediate threat on the Israeli delegation".

On 9 February, three inmates were killed and 12 more injured after soldiers opened fire during a prison riot in Hatay. The prisoners were demanding to see their families affected by the earthquake.

=== Floods ===
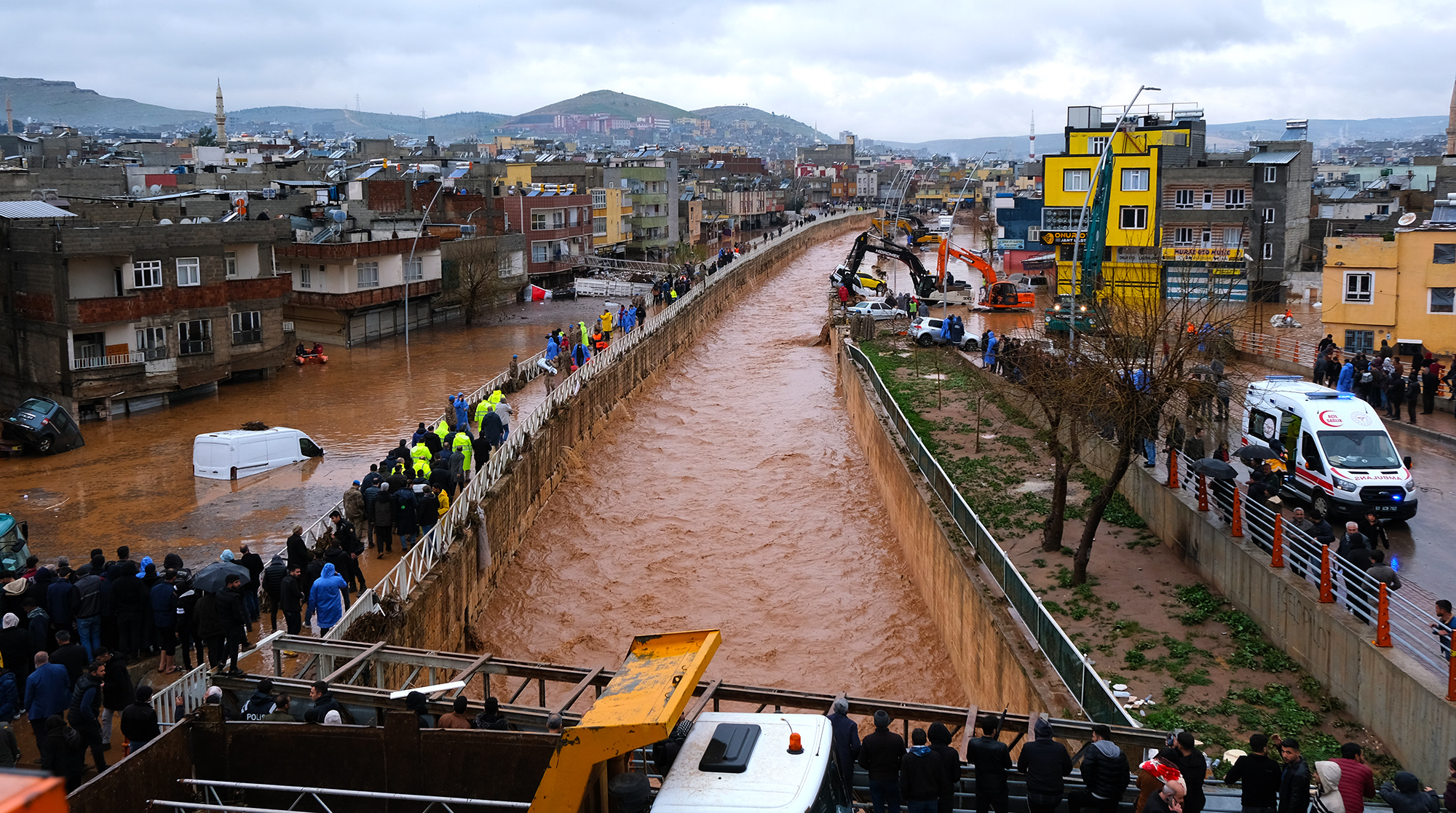
Flooding in Şanlıurfa

Floods which struck the provinces of Adıyaman and Şanlıurfa in March killed at least 21 people. The floods swept away cars, affected homes and campsites housing earthquake survivors. Twelve people, including five Syrians, died in Şanlıurfa. An intensive care unit in a hospital in the province was evacuated. In Adıyaman, two drowning deaths occurred when floodwaters swept away a container home with a family. Over a dozen professional divers participated in search and rescue efforts in each province.

=== 2023 elections ===
Before the earthquake, the government had planned the elections to be held on 14 May 2023, a month earlier than its latest possible date as a snap election. After the earthquake, doubts arose if elections could be held on schedule. On 13 February, Bülent Arınç of the AKP demanded the elections be postponed despite the constitution disallowing such a possibility in the absence of war. Arınç's declaration has been criticized by media outlets and politicians. However, the possibility of this passing through amending the constitution was uncertain, as the governing coalition, with its 333 seats in parliament, could not surpass the 400-number hurdle needed for the motion to succeed. On 18 February, AKP authorities stated that the elections would not be delayed.

Kemal Kılıçdaroğlu of the CHP opposed its postponement on constitutional grounds. Mustafa Tolga Öztürk, YSK member of the İYİ party stated that YSK does not have any power to postpone an election and only parliament has the right to do so, adding that Turkey had no more time to lose with the AKP. Selahattin Demirtaş of the Peoples Democratic Party (HDP) has described the postponement as a political coup. The declaration of state of emergency in the affected regions was also interpreted as a possible measure to postpone elections. Nevertheless, the earthquake led to the opposition Nation Alliance postponing its 13 February meeting for the selection of its consensus presidential candidate to 6 March, which was eventually assumed by Kılıçdaroğlu.

At the elections on 14 May, Erdoğan's People's Alliance retained its majority in the Grand National Assembly, while Erdoğan won in the first round of the presidential election, receiving 49.5%, and won 52.2% of the vote in the second round against Kılıçdaroğlu on 28 May. This marked the first time a Turkish presidential election went into a run-off. In both instances, Erdoğan retained the support of a majority of voters in most of the provinces devastated by the earthquake. However, scholarly analysis of the period between the earthquakes and the election suggests that Erdoğan's handling of the crisis, especially his attempts to shift blame for the earthquake’s destruction led to some backlash among voters, making it a contributing factor to the narrow outcome of the election.

=== Education ===
On 9 February, the Council of Higher Education said education and training at universities in the affected provinces would be suspended until further notice. Student hostels managed by the General Directorate of Higher Education Credit and Hostels would be used to house affected individuals. The minister of national education, Mahmut Özer, ordered a week-long closure of all schools in the country, which was later extended to two weeks. Schools in the affected provinces were suspended until 10 March. Students studying in schools located in the affected provinces would be transferred to other provinces of their choice.

=== Sports ===
After the earthquake, Süper Lig was suspended for over a week to mourn the victims. Clubs from affected regions: Süper Lig clubs Hatayspor, Gaziantep FK, TFF First League club Yeni Malatyaspor, Adanaspor, TFF Second League club Adıyaman FK, Diyarbekirspor and TFF Third League clubs Kahramanmaraşspor, Osmaniyespor FK and Malatya Arguvan SK withdrew from competition. Sivas Belediyespor, Tarsus İdman Yurdu and Niğde Anadolu requested to withdraw but TFF did not approve their requests.

On 6 February, it was announced the 2023 ISF World School Winter Games, which were due to be held in Erzurum, were canceled due to the 'force majeure' situation in the country. On 10 February, it was announced the 2023 Men's EuroHockey Indoor Club Cup was canceled due to the impact of the earthquake. The tournament was intended to be held from 17 to 19 February in Alanya. In an official statement, Minister of Youth and Sports Mehmet Kasapoğlu announced that every national championship would be suspended with immediate effect, until further communications.

All 39 members of the Northern Cypriot Türk Maarif Koleji's high school volleyball team including players, teachers, parents and a trainer died in the collapse of a hotel in Adıyaman.

Three players from Iran's national paralympic football team died in Turkey. Hatayspor's Ghanaian winger Christian Atsu died in the collapse of Rönesans Rezidans in Antakya. His body was found on the morning of 18 February. Atsu was a former Chelsea, Newcastle, Bournemouth and Everton player. Basketball player Nilay Aydogan died in Malatya.

In the first game of the Super Lig after the earthquake between Fenerbahce Istanbul and Konyaspor, fans protested against the Turkish government and shouted demands for its resignation, which was still heard even after the broadcaster of the game BeIN tried to censor the fans' voices. In another football game in Istanbul between Besiktas and Antalyaspor the fans repeated their calls for the government's resignation and threw cuddly toys onto the field.

=== Prosecutions ===
In February 2023, an investigation was launched against the owners of the collapsed Grand Isias Hotel in Adiyaman, resulting in the arrest of Ahmet Bozkurt and his two sons Fatih and Efe. On 25 December 2024, Ahmet Bozkurt, Fatih Bozkurt and an architect, Erdem Yilmaz, were convicted of "causing the death or injury of more than one person through conscious negligence" in the faulty construction of the building. Both Ahmet and Yilmaz were sentenced to 18 years and five months imprisonment each, while Fatih received a prison sentence of 17 years and four months.

== Syria ==
Russian aid reaching affected residences of Aleppo, Syria

President Bashar al-Assad held an emergency meeting with his cabinet to organize a rescue plan for the affected regions. He identified Aleppo, Hama and Latakia governates as the most affected. Following orders from President al-Assad, all teams of the civil defense, firefighting, health, and public construction groups were mobilized to the affected governates. He also added that medical services, food and shelter were urgently needed. The Ministry of Internal Trade and Consumer Protection was ordered by President al-Assad to supply food and organize teams to distribute them. Technical teams were also on site to evaluate building conditions and evacuate residents in at-risk structures. The Ministry of Water Resources was tasked with rapidly assessing damage to dams, reservoirs and water stations, and ensuring people have access to water.

The Syrian government appealed to UN member states, the International Committee of the Red Cross, and other humanitarian organizations for international aid. Syria also requested for aid from the European Union's European Civil Protection Mechanism, according to commissioner Janez Lenarčič. The Syrian government, through its representative in the United Nations, said that it should be responsible for aid distribution in all areas of the country, including those held by the rebels. The UK government said it would deliver aid through its long-term partners, the White Helmets civilian defense force. The US State Department said it would use its humanitarian partners on the ground.

The United Nations Office for the Coordination of Humanitarian Affairs said damaged roads and logistical issues prevented the mobilization of international aid across the border from Turkey. Border crossings into Turkey remained closed on 7 February. Critically injured patients were unable to enter Turkey for medical attention. There were exceptions as to which persons could cross, including individuals holding touristic residence permits who could only cross by foot. The Bab al-Hawa Border Crossing was made accessible on 8 February, according to the UN.

Some hotels including in Latakia and Damascus offered to accommodate to survivors free of charge and ensure basic necessities. Refugees and expatriates also opened their homes as shelters for people. Al-Sham Private University started an effort to receive people. Sports facilities, events venues, university dormitories and halls were also opened to take in people. The Syria Trust for Development announced the establishment of shelters across many governorates. Volunteer groups inspected buildings for damage and distributed food items, blankets, and first aid essentials.

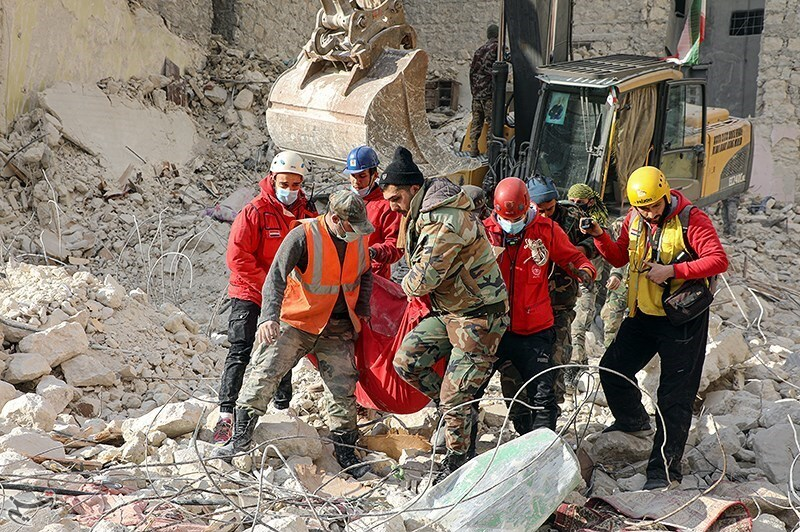
Debris removal in Aleppo, Syria

Due to the high number of casualties, including trauma cases, many hospitals became overcrowded. Hospitals were already experiencing a shortage of medical supplies prior to the earthquake. Hospitals in many cities were forced to operate far beyond capacity. Many patients at hospitals slept on floors due to the lack of beds. The Ministry of Health dispatched medical convoys from the Health Directorates of Damascus, Rif Dimashq Governorate, Quneitra, Homs, and Tartus, to Aleppo and Latakia to rebel-held areas. Twenty-eight ambulances, seven mobile clinics, and four trucks carrying medical, surgical and emergency aid were also dispatched. Local charities across the country, which typically distribute food during the month of Ramadan, have been exhausted to their fullest capacity. One of these charities, Saed Initiative, planned to establish a charity kitchen to provide free meals for the rest of the year. Between 2,500 and 4,000 meals were distributed every day in Aleppo, and the charity plans to distribute up to 40,000 meals every day. Another charity in the city, the al-Bir and al-Ihsan charity, provided 1,500 meals every day.

Over 2,000 Syria Civil Defense (White Helmets) volunteers were sent to all the affected areas to conduct search and rescue efforts. With a lack of equipment and tools, they appealed to other humanitarian organizations for support. Officials on 7 February announced rescue and recovery efforts in Hama ended after 15 hours. Over 298,000 people were left without homes and 180 shelters were opened in government-held areas. About 30,000 people were housed in shelters in Aleppo. As of 10 February, no international rescue workers had arrived in rebel-held Jinderis despite official calls for help.

United States sanctions against Syria relating to the blocking of banks and payment processors led to the banning of international charities and families attempting to send money to people affected in Syria. On 7 February 2023, the Syrian Arab Red Crescent urged Western countries to lift sanctions against Syria, saying the measures hurt civilians and humanitarian efforts during the earthquake recovery effort. The sanctions are a series of economic measures taken by the European Union, the United States, Canada, Australia, Switzerland, and the Arab League against the Assad regime from the start of the civil war in 2011. They include an oil embargo and the freezing of financial assets of the state and government officials. There were requests to lift or suspend the sanctions to aid humanitarian efforts following the earthquake.

On 10 February, the United States announced it would exempt sanctions against Syria for 180 days. The ease of sanctions was for "all transactions related to earthquake relief efforts", according to the United States Department of the Treasury. The Syrian Foreign Ministry responded in a statement that the US' decision was "misleading and aims to give a false humanitarian impression" and that "the facts on the ground proved its falsehood." Some commentators have argued that the sanctions do not pose a problem for the delivery of humanitarian aid to Syria.

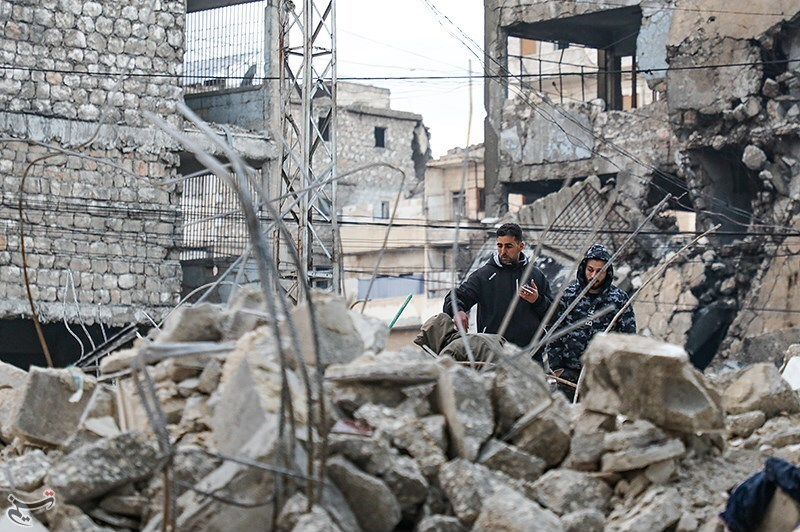
Building wreckage in Aleppo

International humanitarian assistance began entering northwestern Syria on 9 February via Turkey through the Bab al-Hawa Border Crossing. The first convoy of six trucks carried tents and sanitary items. Turkey said it was working to open two additional border crossings. On 10 February 14 trucks carrying aid crossed from Turkey into Syria, according to the United Nations. The United States Central Command announced it would cooperate with Syrian Democratic Forces to assist the affected population in Syria. On 11 February, World Health Organization director-general Tedros Adhanom Ghebreyesus visited Aleppo, accompanying a shipment of emergency medical supplies. On 12 February, all schools across Syria, except for those in the affected areas, were resumed since the earthquakes struck. Schools in Aleppo, Lattakia, Hama and Idleb remained closed. On 14 February, the Syrian government agreed to open the border crossings at Bab al-Salameh and Al-Rai for three months.

President al-Assad met UN relief chief Martin Griffiths on 21 March to discuss post-earthquake recovery and aid.

A year later and the situation was still described as "devastating" by Julien Barnes-Dacey, director of the Middle East & North Africa programme at the European Council. The Human Rights Watch said Syria's humanitarian and economic had deteriorated further; many damaged infrastructure have not been cleared. Furthermore, the number of people who rely on aid had increased, while funding for UN organizations had diminished. The UN deputy regional humanitarian coordinator for the Syria crisis said the relief response following the earthquakes was the most underfunded plan in terms of percentage, with funding at 38 percent, since the crisis began in 2011.
