= Grand Isias Hotel =

Hotel in Adıyaman, Turkey

The Grand Isias Hotel was a four-star hotel in Adıyaman, Turkey. It came to prominence when it was destroyed during an earthquake in February 2023. 72 people died in the aftermath of its collapse, including thirty-five members of two volleyball teams from Northern Cyprus. Allegations of corruption led to protests by victims, and further to the detention of the proprietor and the hotel manager.

== Construction ==
The construction of the building began in 1991, and was planned as a residential house. After an accident in 1995, construction was halted for six years. In 2001, the city gave its permission to continue its construction. During the process of its construction, it was decided for the building to become a hotel. The construction was interrupted several times due to violations of the construction regulations. Eventually, the hotel was inaugurated as Grand Isias in 2002. After three years, the building received another level and an additional thirty rooms. In 2018, the hotel received another level. To make room for a subterranean garage and also the lobby, some structural pillars were removed. In July 2022, the hotel was able to be booked over the internet.

== Ownership ==
The owner of the hotel, Ahmet Bozkurt, is said to have well established relations to the party of the Turkish President Recep Tayyip Erdoğan, the Justice and Development Party (AKP). Ahmet Bozkurt was a member of the board in a local branch of the TÜGVA, which is headed by Bilal Erdoğan, the son of the Turkish President. Ahmet Bozkurt's son was the hotel manager and also a member of the city council of Adıyaman for the Justice and Development Party (AKP). The daughter of Ahmet Bozkurt is a daughter-in-law to the Turkish Minister of Tourism Mehmet Ersoy. Protests against the Bozkurt family after the earthquake eventually led to the detention of the father and two sons.

== Earthquake ==
On 6 February an earthquake devastated the city of Adıyaman and also destroyed the Grand Isias hotel. Two high school volleyball teams from Northern Cyprus and their entourage were staying at the hotel at the time of the earthquake. Four team members were able to rescue themselves by themselves, one was rescued later. The others died. Thirty tour guides, who participated at a touristic event and also stayed at the hotel at the time, also died.

=== Investigation ===
In February 2023, an investigation was launched against the members of the Bozkurt family and Ahmet Bozkurt and his two sons Fatih and Efe were arrested. The prosecution denied there was a secrecy order over the case file as was reported in some media.

On 25 December 2024, Ahmet Bozkurt, Fatih Bozkurt and an architect, Erdem Yilmaz, were convicted of "causing the death or injury of more than one person through conscious negligence". Both Ahmet and Yilmaz were sentenced to 18 years and five months imprisonment each, while Fatih received a prison sentence of 17 years and four months.
