= Kurtoğlu =

Kurtoğlu is a Turkish name. In old times it was a patronymic lakap (epithet) meaning "son of Kurt", from the Turkish first name "Kurt". The latter name literally means "wolf" in Turkish. In modern times the epithet has become a surname. Notable people with this epithet or surname include:

== Epithet ==
- Kurtoğlu Hızır Reis, Ottoman admiral
- Kurtoğlu Muslihiddin Reis (1487–c. 1530), Ottoman privateer and admiral

== Surname ==
- Aydın Kurtoğlu (born 1983), Turkish musician
- Cengiz Kurtoğlu (born 1959), Turkish musician
- Ermal Kurtoğlu (born 1980), Albanian-Turkish basketball player
