= Sümeyye Erdoğan =

Daughter of Recep Tayyip Erdoğan

Sümeyye Bayraktar
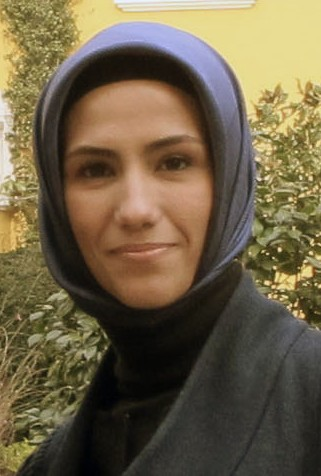
- Bayraktar in 2011
- Born: Sümeyye Erdoğan; 22 August 1985 (age 40); Şişli, Istanbul, Turkey
- Education: Araklı İmam Hatip High School; Indiana University Bloomington (BA); London School of Economics (MSc)
- Occupation(s): Businesswoman; Founder for Women & Democracy Association (KADEM)
- Spouse: Selçuk Bayraktar (m. 2016)
- Children: 2
- Parent(s): Recep Tayyip Erdoğan; Emine Erdoğan
- Relatives: Ahmet Burak Erdoğan (oldest brother); Necmettin Bilal Erdoğan (second brother); Esra Erdoğan (older sister)

Sümeyye Bayraktar (née Erdoğan; born 22 August 1985) is a Turkish businesswoman and the daughter of President Recep Tayyip Erdoğan. In 2013, she was one of the chief advisers of her father who was prime minister at the time.

== Early life and education ==
Her father is Recep Tayyip Erdoğan and her mother is Emine Erdoğan. She has three siblings: Ahmet Burak, Necmettin Bilal and Esra. In March 2016, she became engaged to Selçuk Bayraktar, and married him on 14 May 2016.

She graduated from Araklı İmam Hatip High School in Trabzon. After not getting her desired grade in the university entrance exams in 2002, she continued her education in the United States. With a scholarship from a businessman, (Note: Güran Giyim's owner, Remzi Gür, provided the scholarship.) (Note: There are also allegations that the relations between the Erdoğan family and Remzi Gür have affected some real estate sales.) she received a bachelor's degree in sociology and politics from Indiana University Bloomington. After completing her education in 2005, she completed her master's degree in economics at the London School of Economics.

== Career ==
In 2010, she became a partner at Doruk Izgara Food Trade Limited Company. Her brother Bilal Erdoğan was reported to be among the company's partners.

== Politics ==
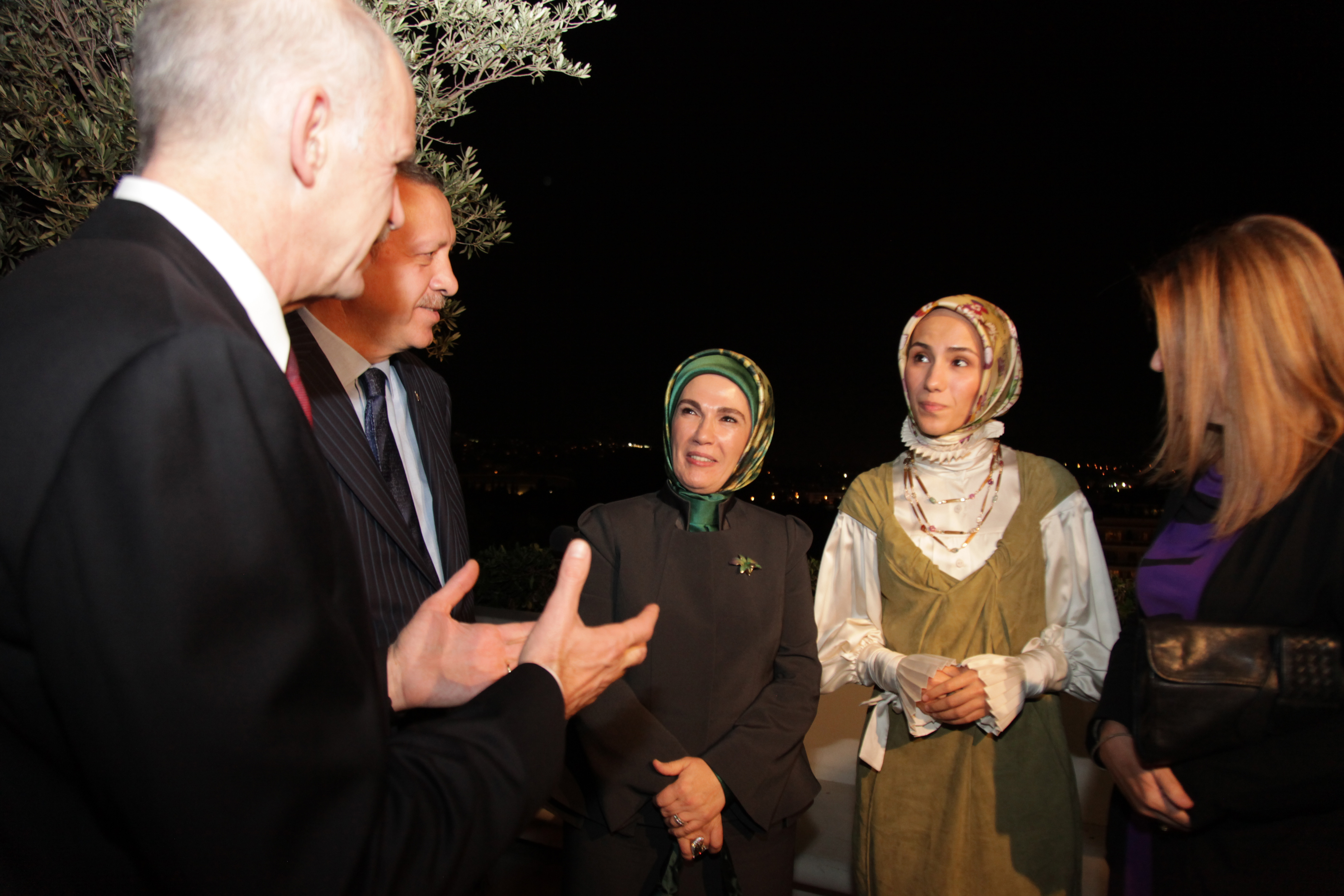
Sümeyye Erdoğan (second from right) with her parents during a visit to Greece, October 2010

In 2010, she started to work as a consultant in the Justice and Development Party (AKP), responsible for monitoring foreign relations and their reflections on the world press. (Note: The press claimed that she received a salary of 25,000 euros. The rumors were rejected by AKP executives.) Due to this position, she has been a part of many international trips. She was a counselor to her father during four years, a role she decided not to carry on in October 2014. During the Gezi Park protests in 2013, she was involved in meetings between the government and various artists. Her participation in the meetings was questioned and moved to the agenda of the TBMM for further discussion.

== Controversies ==
It was claimed that a website which published her photographs while she was staying in the USA was closed down. An unnamed official from the Hugehost company said that after a phone call from Ankara they were left disturbed and could not provide service anymore. (Note: A review by Barış Zeren on this event: "İşte Başbakan'ın kızlarının ABD'deki hayatı". OdaTV. 6 November 2013. Archived from the original on 26 September 2015.)

Sümeyye Bayraktar, who was among the audience of Genç Osman at the Ankara State Theater, left the hall during the play saying that the movements carried out in accordance with the scenario were intended to insult her. As a result of the investigation, it was concluded that the actors did not have any negative behavior and the usual scenario was played out on stage.

In the period following the 2013 December 17 corruption scandal, voice recordings of Sümeyye Bayraktar, who was setting the agenda for instructing AKP trolls on Twitter to tweet in favor of them on social media, were published. Again, based on the sound recordings released during this period, it was revealed that together with her brother Bilal Erdoğan, she transferred money from their homes to different places on their father's instructions and met with Mustafa Latif Topbaş about the villas built in the archaeological site in Urla and pursued business.

It was claimed that Sümeyye Bayraktar had reached an agreement with a company to remove news published on the Internet about her private life in the past. OdaTV later reported that they had been contacted by a company, who claimed to be in charge of taking care of "Sümeyye Erdoğan's reputation on online services" and asked them to delete an article that they had published about her two years ago.

== Personal life ==
She married Selçuk Bayraktar, to whom she got engaged in March 2016, on May 14, 2016. On August 13, 2017, the couple's daughter Canan Aybüke was born. Their son, Asım Özdemir, was born on January 9, 2024.
