= Ahmet Burak Erdoğan =

Turkish businessman

- Born: 5 July 1979 (age 47); Istanbul, Turkey
- Education: İmam Hatip school Istanbul Bilgi University
- Occupation: Owner of MB Denizcilik
- Known for: Death of Sevim Tanürek; Being the eldest son of Recep Tayyip Erdoğan
- Spouse: Sema Ketenci (m. 2001)
- Children: 1
- Parent(s): Recep Tayyip Erdoğan; Emine Erdoğan
- Relatives: Bilal Erdoğan (brother); Esra Erdoğan (sister); Sümeyye Erdoğan (sister)

Ahmet Burak Erdoğan (born 5 July 1979) is a Turkish businessman, the owner of MB Denizcilik, and the eldest son of Recep Tayyip Erdoğan, the President of Turkey. In 1998, he killed Turkish classical music singer Sevim Tanürek while driving without a valid license and fled the scene, though he was later acquitted based on a forensic report that attributed fault to the victim, amid allegations of evidence tampering.

== Personal life ==
Ahmet Burak Erdoğan was born in Istanbul on 4 July 1979, the son of Recep Tayyip Erdoğan and his wife Emine Erdoğan, and educated at İmam Hatip school. He has a bachelor's degree from Istanbul Bilgi University. As with all his siblings, his higher education was paid for by Remzi Gür, a Turkish textile entrepreneur and friend of the Erdoğan family.

In 2001, Erdoğan married Sema Ketenci, the daughter of Osman Ketenci, and it is said that the couple had one child.

== Traffic accident ==
On 11 May 1998, while driving through Abide-i Hürriyet street in Şişli, Istanbul, he hit Turkish classical music singer Sevim Tanürek with his car. She suffered a traumatic brain injury and fell into a coma, dying five days later in intensive care. Erdoğan did not have a driving licence and fled the scene, yet ultimately received no punishment. Following the accident killing Tanürek, he fled Turkey to hide in London. Tanürek's husband describes the incident as follows;

"Tayyip's son was speeding through a red light. A squad was chasing him with sirens blaring. While fleeing, he hit my wife 5 meters before the pedestrian crossing. He dragged her 30 meters. My wife died 6 days later. When he was caught, he told the police that he was Tayyip's son. Everything changed from that moment on. We went to the police station, they didn't ask for his driver's license. When we reminded the police about this, they said, 'Don't be smart, we know what to do'. Immediately after the accident, the municipality came to our street. For the first time in history, our street was washed from top to bottom. The brake marks which span a length of 35 meters were eradicated in an instant. The boy didn't have a driver's license. After the accident, they issued him a driver's license as if it was issued three months ago. He never showed up during the trial. He had been sent abroad by his father! But Tayyip's men were always there. We were blackmailed, threatened and harassed whenever we said something to defend my wife's rights.

When we told the judge that the boy didn't have a driver's license and that after the accident he was given a fake license with his father's forge, we were scolded: "What do you mean, you are accusing the mayor of forgery?" I am a calm person, but if I had something in my hand at that moment, I would have thrown it at his head.

All the witnesses who saw the incident were threatened and intimidated. This includes one of our relatives. Only one young girl resisted to testify. But the situation had changed. The families of the policemen at the Şişli police station who didn't ask for the boy's driver's license and the traffic police officers who issued fake licenses came and begged us many times during the trial, saying that if we pressed the matter, their husbands would be dismissed and they would go hungry. We did not file a complaint against them either!

Every day, municipality vehicles stopped by our door and Tayyip's men always appeared in front of our us. As with the witnesses, we received at least 20 'supplicants' who told us not to bother. Tayyip was the mayor. That's when we realized that we were up against a 'giant' and it would not be possible to deal with him. So we got together as a family council and decided to leave it alone... Because there would be no result. They were too powerful and in the end the court had already given its verdict! The boy, who was 4 out of 8 at fault, was sentenced to 3 months in prison. This was later converted into a fine..."

== Career ==
He bought a shipping company together with Mustafa Erdoğan and Ziya İlgen in 2006 and they named it Bumerz. In 2007 Erdoğan co-founded the shipping company MB Denizcilik together with Mecit Çetinkaya, who as well owns the sea freight company Manta Denizcilik. In November 2013, MB bought a sixth ship, Pretty, built in China for over $20 million and with a capacity of 91,000 tons, to add to the existing five ships, Safran 1, Sakarya, G. İnebolu, Cihan and Bosna that it owns. The acquisition of Pretty almost doubled the company's shipping capacity. In 2013, Ynetnews reported that one of MB's ships, 95-metre Safran-1 had travelled several times between Turkish and Israeli ports despite the poor relations between the two countries, and that in the Turkish Parliament, opposition MPs had asked his father: "Has your son been exempted from the trade embargo against Israel? Is it ethical? What share of the volume of trade with Israel did the ship owned by your son take?" Ynetnews noted that no formal trade embargo had existed at the time, except for arms sales.

In 2015, Aydınlık reported that Erdoğan now owned 99% of MB (with Çetinkaya owning the other 1%) and that MB owned tankers worth US$80 million.
