= Sevim Tanürek =

Turkish musical artist (1934–1998)

- Born: 1934(?)
- Died: 16 May 1998 (aged 63–64) Istanbul, Turkey
- Genres: Turkish classical music
- Occupation: Singer

Sevim Tanürek (1934(?) – 16 May 1998) was a Turkish classical music artist.

== Early life ==
She performed in TRT's Radio Ankara between 1950 and 1959. Afterwards, she started her stage performances in Istanbul. She released some 45 rpm singles, sang together with her musical group in a number of film scores and acted also in three movies and one television series as a singer.

== Traffic crash and death ==
On 11 May 1998 at around 11:45 a.m. local time, while walking on a pedestrian crossing with a green traffic light for pedestrians, she was hit by a motorist and severely injured. The driver, who fled the scene of the crash, was identified as Ahmet Burak Erdoğan, son of the future president of Turkey Recep Tayyip Erdoğan, then mayor of Istanbul. Tanürek was taken suffering from severe traumatic brain injury first to Şişli Children's Hospital (Turkish: Şişli Etfal Hastanesi), and then delivered to Taksim German Hospital (Turkish: Alman Hastanesi), where she underwent surgery and was treated in the intensive care unit. Five days after the accident, she died on 16 May 1998.

Ahmet Burak Erdoğan allegedly did not possess a drivers' license at the time of the accident. He was tried without being arrested. Although in a first report, he was found guilty by "3 points in 8" and a prison term of 3–20 months was suggested by the prosecutor, upgraded to 2–5 years after the death of Tanürek, he was found innocent in a final hearing and absolved, as the court found that Tanürek was alone responsible for being hit.

After the accident, Tanürek's husband said that although they knew her health condition was in question, he did not expect her death. He called for the motorist to be punished, and denied agreeing to accept TL 20,000 blood money. "There cannot be forgiveness with money".

Following a memorial service held in front of the Radio Istanbul building, she was laid to rest at the Zincirlikuyu Cemetery. She is survived by her husband Ahmet and son Cavit.

== Recognition ==
In 2007, a song contest was established in her honor.

== Filmography ==
- Güzeller Resmi Geçidi, movie (1960)
- Tosun İle Yosun, movie (1963)
- Taş Plaktan Bugüne, television series (1989)
