= Bilal Erdoğan =

Turkish businessman (born 1981)

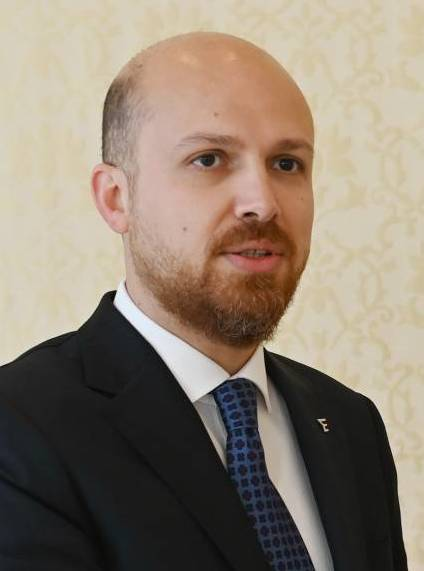
- Born: Necmettin Bilal Erdoğan; 24 April 1981 (age 45); Istanbul, Turkey
- Education: Indiana University Bloomington; Harvard University
- Spouse: Reyyan Uzuner (m. 2003)
- Children: 3
- Parent(s): Recep Tayyip Erdoğan; Emine Erdoğan
- Relatives: Ahmet Burak Erdoğan (brother); Esra Erdoğan (sister); Sümeyye Erdoğan (sister)

Necmettin Bilal Erdoğan (born 23 April 1981) is a Turkish businessman and the second-born child of President Recep Tayyip Erdoğan.

== Early life ==
Necmettin Bilal was born on 24 April 1981, the second child of Recep Tayyip Erdoğan and Emine Erdoğan. He has an older brother, Ahmet Burak, and two younger sisters, Esra Erdoğan and Sümeyye Erdoğan. After finishing secondary school at Kartal Anadolu İmam Hatip Lisesi in 1999, Erdoğan moved to the United States, and graduated from Indiana University Bloomington with a bachelor's degree in political science and economics. He then earned a master's degree from the John F. Kennedy School of Government at Harvard University in 2004.

== Career ==
After graduation, he served at the World Bank as an intern for a while. He returned to Turkey in 2006 and started his business life. Erdoğan is one of the three equal shareholders of BMZ Group Denizcilik ve İnşaat Sanayi Anonym Şirketi, a marine transportation corporation. He is also on the governing board of the Turkish Youth Foundation (TÜGVA) which is exempt of paying taxes by decree of the Turkish president, Bilal's father.

== Personal life ==
Erdoğan married Reyyan Uzuner in 2003. The couple have two sons, Ömer Tayyip and Ali Tahir, and a daughter, Fatıma Serra.

In October 2014, Today's Zaman reported that Erdoğan and his family had moved to Bologna, Italy, after his father's AK Party lost its parliamentary majority in June. It is stated that he will finish his PhD at The Johns Hopkins University SAIS Bologna Center there, but that all he has to do is complete his thesis, which does not require his permanent presence in Bologna, but does enable him to obtain a two-year residence permit.

In February 2017 the prosecuting attorney of Bologna started a lawsuit for money laundering against him.

== Corruption scandal ==
Erdoğan came under accusations of corruption during the 2013 corruption scandal in Turkey that extended to other top members of TÜRGEV, for which he gave testimony.
