= Esra Erdoğan =

Turkish sociologist; daughter of Recep Tayyip Erdoğan

Esra Erdoğan Albayrak
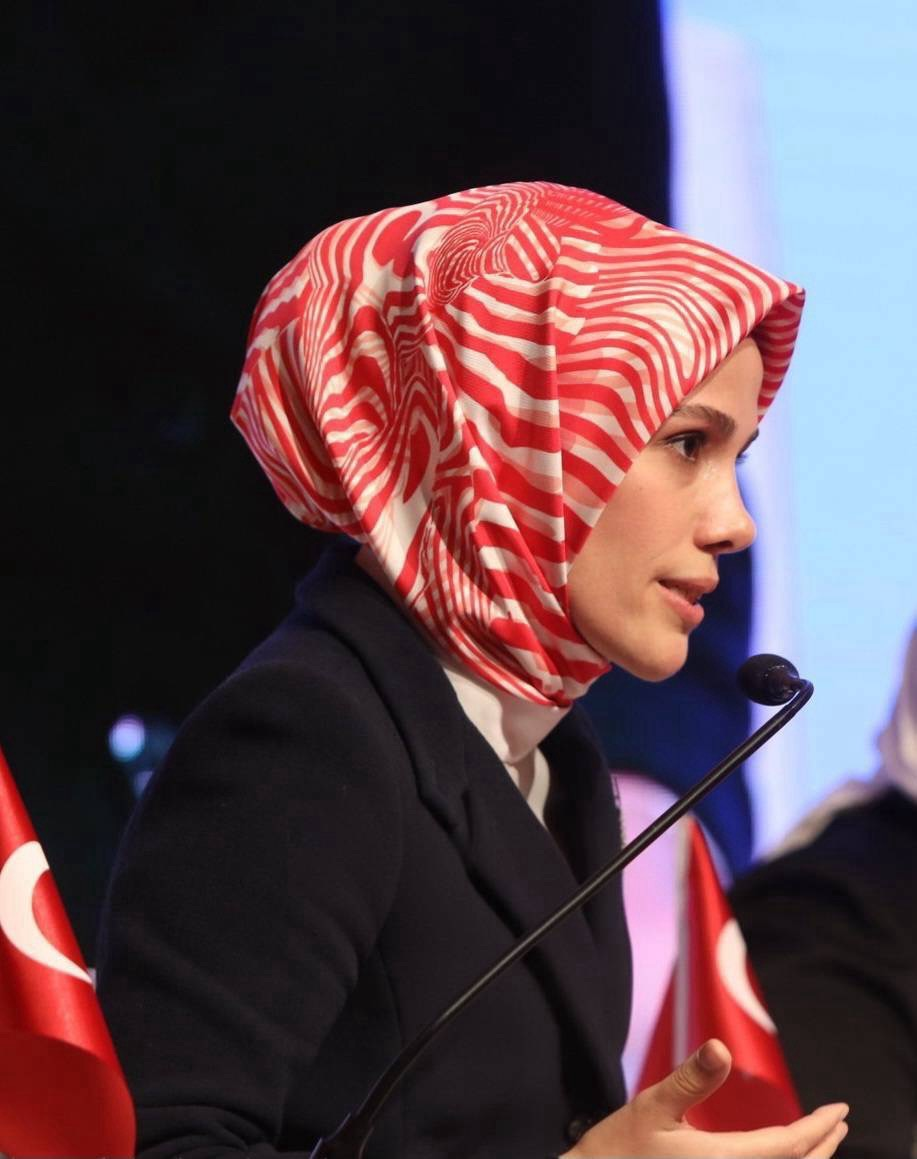
- Born: Esra Erdoğan; 14 October 1983 (age 42); Istanbul, Turkey
- Education: Indiana University Bloomington (BA); University of California, Berkeley (MA, PhD)
- Spouse: Berat Albayrak (m. 2004)
- Children: 4
- Parent(s): Recep Tayyip Erdoğan; Emine Erdoğan
- Relatives: Ahmet Burak Erdoğan (brother); Necmettin Bilal Erdoğan (brother); Sümeyye Erdoğan (sister)

Esra Erdoğan Albayrak (born 14 October 1983) is a Turkish social sciences researcher, education administrator, and civil society figure. She is the daughter of Turkish president Recep Tayyip Erdoğan and Emine Erdoğan, and the wife of former Turkish minister Berat Albayrak.

== Family ==
Esra Erdoğan was born in Istanbul on 14 October 1983 at Şişli Etfal Hospital. She is the third of four children of Recep Tayyip Erdoğan and his wife Emine. Her siblings are Ahmet Burak, Bilal and Sümeyye Erdoğan.

On 11 July 2004, she married Berat Albayrak, the son of journalist and writer Sadık Albayrak, at the Lütfi Kırdar International Convention and Exhibition Center in Istanbul. The wedding ceremony was attended by King Abdullah II of Jordan, Pakistani president Pervez Musharraf, Romanian prime minister Adrian Năstase, Greek prime minister Kostas Karamanlis, Turkish foreign minister Abdullah Gül and Speaker of the Grand National Assembly Bülent Arınç as witnesses.

== Education ==
Albayrak completed her secondary education at Kadıköy Anadolu İmam Hatip High School in 2000.

She studied sociology and history at Indiana University Bloomington, where she completed a double major with honors in 2003. She also completed a minor in East European and Russian Studies. During her undergraduate studies, she prepared an honors thesis under the supervision of Melissa Wilde on civil society traditions in Turkey.

She later completed her master's and doctoral studies in sociology at the University of California, Berkeley, receiving her doctorate in the sociology of culture and politics in 2014.

== Academic work ==
Her doctoral dissertation, Creating Cultures of Piety: Secularism, Mobility, Gender and the IHL Schools in Turkey 1951-2010, examined models of religious education in different secular systems and analyzed Imam Hatip schools in relation to secularism, social mobility, gender and religion-state relations through comparative cohort analysis and qualitative research methods.

Her dissertation committee included Raka Ray, Ann Swidler and Saba Mahmood.

Her stated academic interests include religion-state relations, comparative education systems, civil society, democracy, addiction studies and decolonization.

== Social activities ==
Albayrak served as the founding chair of the Women Consultative Council of the Organisation of Islamic Cooperation between 2016 and 2019.

During her tenure, the "ALLY for Future Leadership Program for Young Women" was launched in cooperation with the Turkish Ministry of Family and Social Policies and the OIC. The program brought together young women from 45 countries in a leadership and solidarity network.

Media reports covered statements by Albayrak concerning Jerusalem, Islamophobia and solidarity with the Muslim community after the Christchurch mosque attacks in New Zealand. Albayrak became involved with the Turkish Green Crescent Society (Yeşilay) through the "Don't Burn Your Cigarette or Me" campaign and began serving as a board member following the organization's 69th General Assembly in 2012.

She has served on the board of trustees of the Green Crescent Foundation since 2024. Since 2013, she has served on the board of the Turkey Youth and Education Service Foundation (TÜRGEV), where she participated in the establishment of TÜRGEV Academy, the Pusula program and the EDEP Education Support Program.

She has also served on the board of the TURKEN Foundation, which was established to provide educational services to Turkish students studying abroad. Since 2016, she has served as chair of the board of the NUN Education and Culture Foundation.

The foundation organizes the annual "Education One Step Beyond Summit", which brings together educators from Turkey and abroad to discuss current educational issues. In 2024, the foundation established Enstitü Sosyal, which conducts research and educational programs in the fields of education, society and economics.
