= Vahide Aydın =

Austrian-Turkish politician

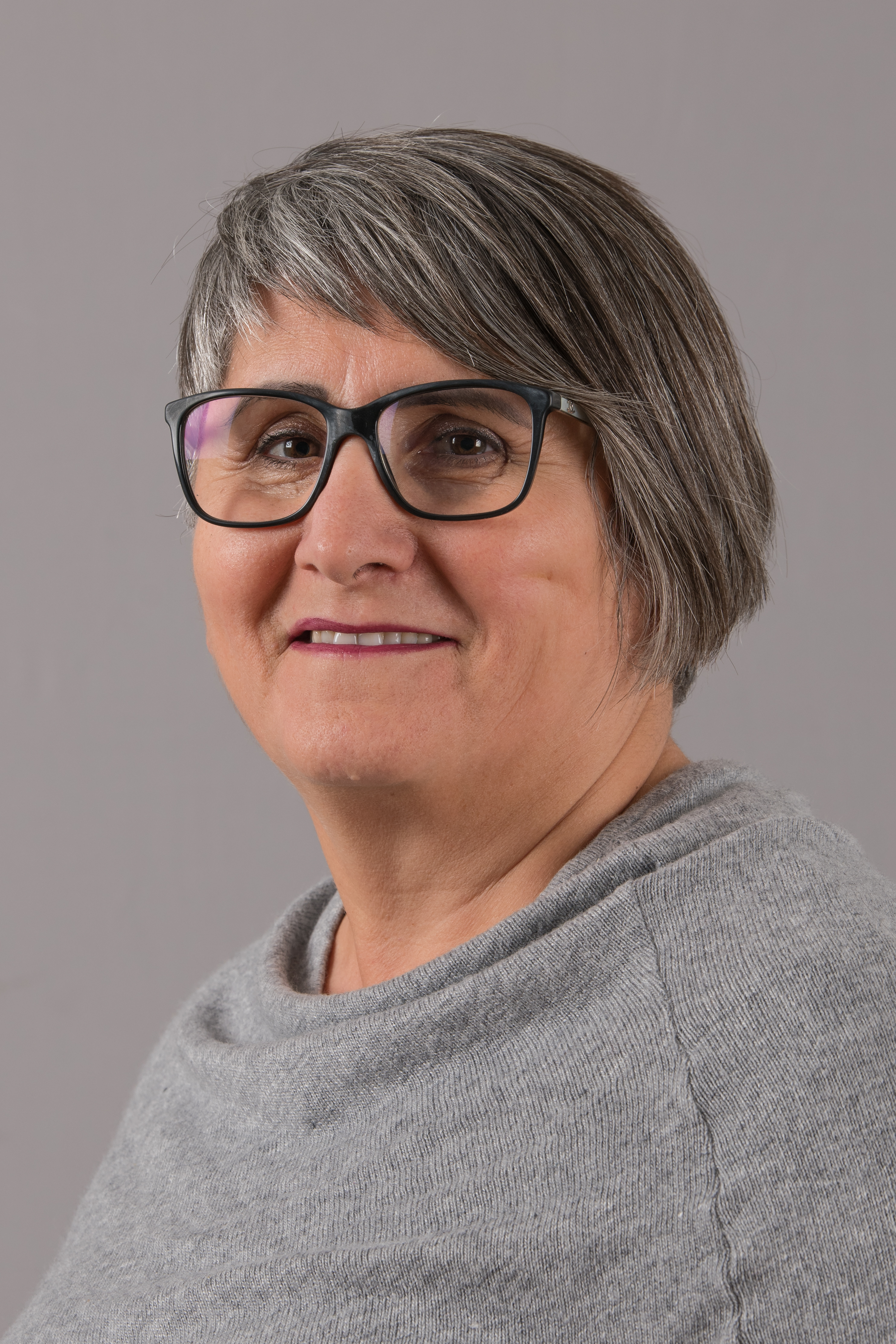
Vahide Aydın (2017)

Vahide Aydın (born 3 October 1968 in Turkey) is an Austrian-Turkish politician and social worker.

== Politics ==
In 2000 Aydın joined the Greens and became a member of the Open Dornbirn as a city representative. Since 2007 she has been the speaker of the Green migrants and by 2009 a Member of Parliament.

== Personal life ==
Aydın is married and mother of two children.
