= BMZ Group =

Turkish shipping company

BMZ Group is a Turkish shipping company based in Üsküdar, Istanbul,.

It is owned by the Turkish President Recep Tayyip Erdoğan's son Bilal Erdoğan and other family members, Mustafa Erdoğan and Ziya İlgen.

In September 2015, it was reported in Today's Zaman that BMZ had purchased two tankers, Armada Fair and Türkter 82, for US$36 million, increasing their fleet to five tankers, all of which are 140m long, 16m wide, with a 7100 deadweight tonnage (DWT) capacity.
