= TÜRGEV =

Turkish non-profit foundation

TÜRGEV (Turkish Youth and Education Service Foundation) is a foundation established in 1996 under the leadership of the then Mayor of Istanbul Metropolitan Municipality, Recep Tayyip Erdoğan. It continues its activities as a non-profit foundation that provides dormitories, scholarships and education services to girls.

== History ==
In 1996, it was serving only in Istanbul under the name of Istanbul Youth and Education Service Foundation (İSEGEV), but in August 2012, it was changed to Türkiye Youth and Education Service Foundation (TÜRGEV) in order to expand its service area.

The foundation, which has aimed to support the education of female students in particular since its establishment, has gradually begun to operate throughout Türkiye.

== Fields of Activity ==
Having left 28 years behind, the Foundation continues its work with thousands of students, 24 dormitories, Güzel İşler Fabrikası (GİF) Education Campuses in 7 locations, student scholarships and educational activities.

== Institutional Structure ==
The Chairman of the Board is Fatmanur Altun. Esra Albayrak, daughter of Erdoğan, is among the members of the Board of Directors of the Foundation.

== Allegations of corruption ==
- During the December 17 corruption and bribery investigation, it was included in the indictment that Rıza Sarraf's private courier entered the foundation building with 2 bags on July 19, 2013 and delivered money with these bags.
- It was alleged that Saudi King Abdullah bin Abdulaziz al-Saud donated 100 million dollars to TÜRGEV and in return, a zoning permit was granted for Sevda Hill.
- Arzu Akalın, the new chair of the foundation's board of directors, confirmed the donations made by Reza Sarraf and the Saudi King, but said that the alleged gains in return for the donations remained at the level of allegations.
