= Aydın Kurtoğlu =

Turkish composer, singer, and songwriter (born 1983)

- Born: 24 January 1983 (age 43); Rize, Turkey
- Citizenship: Turkey
- Occupations: Composer; singer; songwriter
- Years active: 2014–present
- Parent: Cengiz Kurtoğlu
- Musical career
- Genre: Pop
- Label: DMC
- Website: aydinkurtoglu.com.tr

Aydın Kurtoğlu (born 24 January 1983) is a Turkish composer, singer, and songwriter.

In 2014, he released his first single "Köle" together with a music video. In 2015, his first EP album Hayırlı Günler and second single "Öptüm" were released. A song with the same title as the EP and the single were both turned into music videos and released separately. In 2015, he was chosen as the best newcomer artist at the Turkey Music Awards.

In October 2015, he voiced Grouchy Smurf on the musical "Smurfs Live on Stage", which was organized in Istanbul and made its debut in Dubai.

== Early life ==
Aydın Kurtoğlu was born on 24 January 1983 in Rize. He is the son of Cengiz Kurtoğlu and Fatma Kurtoğlu. He has a brother named Orhan, and a sister named Aylin. When he was 1 year old, his family moved to Istanbul. He finished his primary and higher education in Istanbul and studied business in university. He then continued to work in tourism sector In 2013, together with his father he participated in the competition Veliaht.

== Career ==
In 2014, he started his career with the release of the single "Köle". The single was produced by BSK Production. The song was written and composed by Nida Ünsal and arranged by Serkan Balkan. Hande Ünsal also served as a backing vocalist. "Köle" was turned into a music video by the production company Dna İstanbul. It was shot for three days at Orion Studios. Hande Ünsal appeared alongside Kurtoğlu in the music video.

Another song "Yana Yana" was released together with "Köle" which was written by Kurtoğlu and Hande Ünsal. In 2015, he released his first EP album Hayırlı Günler and second single "Öptüm". Hayırlı Günler was produced by Doğan Music Company. The EP's lead single, also titled "Hayırlı Günler", was written by Hakkı Yalçın, composed by Ceyhun Çelikten, and arranged by Serkan Balkan. Tarık Ceran did the mix and mastering of the album. All of the album recordings took place at Marşandiz, Soundtrack, Digilocby TC, and Dr. Voice studios. The crew of the album included: Metehan Köseoğlu (acoustic guitar), Görkem Oker (bass guitar), Mehmet Akatay (percussion), Eyüp Hamiş (reed), and Gündem Yaylı Group (violin). Hande Ünsal and Melda Gürbey both served as backing vocalists. His first single "Köle" was included in the album in its original form, in addition to an acoustic and new radio versions. Serkan Balkan did the mix of the two new versions of the song, while Tarık Ceran did the mastering at Digilocby TC studio. Hasan Kuyucu directed the music video for the song "Hayırlı Günler". The shootings took place in Berlin and Istanbul. Doğan Music Company also produced his second single "Öptüm", with Samsun Demir serving as the executive producer. "Öptüm" was written by Hande Ünsal, and arranged by Serkan Balkan. Tarık Ceran again the mix-mastering, and it was finally turned into a music video by Tamer Aydoğdu. In 2015, he voiced Grouchy Smurf on the musical Smurfs Live On Stage which was released in Dubai on 16 January 2015 and later under Vitamin Marketing's organization was shown in Istanbul's Zorlu Performing Arts Center on 22–25 October 2015. Between 2018 and 2019, he continued his career with the singles "Söz", "Olay Ne" (feat. Murat Joker) and "Gururdan Gömlek". In 2019, he also appeared as a featured artist on Ozan Doğulu's album 130 BPM Kreşendo, performing the song "Deli Fişek".

== Personal life ==
During his military service, Kurtoğlu met Sinem Genç. He married her in 2008 at a ceremony in Cevahir Hotel. Recep Tayyip Erdoğan, Emine Erdoğan, Muammer Güler, Kadir Topbaş, and Celalettin Cerrah, were among the notable guests at the wedding service. Aydın Kurtoğlu and Sinem Genç's marriage was officiated by Kadir Topbaş. Recep Tayyip Erdoğan and Şahin Özer were the witnesses.

== Discography ==
=== Singles ===
- "Köle"
- "Öptüm"
- "Yak"
- "Söz"
- "Olay Ne" (feat. Murat Joker)
- "Gururdan Gömlek"
- "Tek"
- "Tek (Acoustic)"
- "Şahsiyet"
- "Şahsiyet (Acoustic)"
- "Çiçek"
- "Afet-i Devran"
- "Sayende"
- "Sayende (Acoustic)"
- "Bırakın"
- "Gözün Aydın"
- "Ben"
- "Hastane Önünde" (feat. Tarık İster)
- "Bi Şarkı"

=== EP albums ===
- Hayırlı Günler

=== Compilations ===
- Pişman
