= TÜGVA =

Turkish youth and student foundation

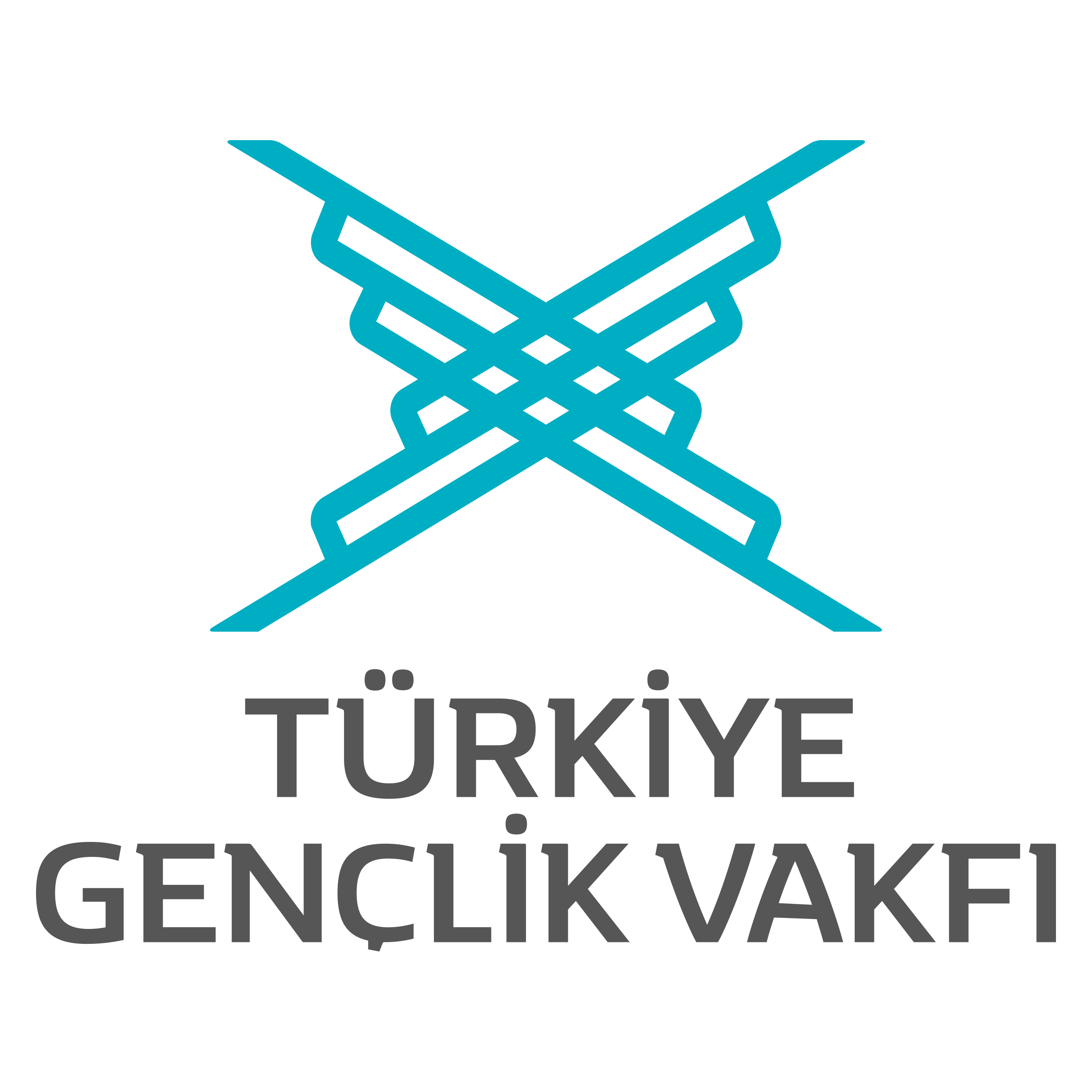
- Formation: 2014
- Type: Non-governmental organization
- Headquarters: Eyüpsultan-Istanbul Türkiye Gençlik Vakfı
- Leader: İbrahim Beşinci
- Website: https://tugva.org/

The Turkish Youth Foundation (Turkish: Türkiye Gençlik Vakfı) or TÜGVA is a youth and student foundation based in Istanbul.

Bilal Erdoğan, the son of the President of the Republic of Turkey Recep Tayyip Erdoğan, is a member of the high advisory board of the foundation and held the opening of the provincial representative offices. This has caused the foundation to be associated with Bilal Erdoğan in the media. The foundation publishes a magazine called Özçekim (Selfie).

== Criticism ==
=== Eviction tensions in Büyükada ===
The Foundation's organization of religious programs in schools affiliated to the Ministry of National Education, the allocation of İzmir Atatürk High School to the Foundation, and the renting of a high-priced place in İzmit to TÜGVA for 120 liras were on the agenda of the media. In addition, during the AK Party era, the Istanbul Metropolitan Municipality (IBB) rented the Büyükada Pier in Büyükada, Istanbul, for 2,000 TL with a 10-year contract, despite the high price.

=== Allegation of state cadre recruitment ===
Journalist and academic Metin Cihan received some documents via e-mail claiming that the foundation had appointed names to state positions, and accused the foundation of being the second parallel state organization. Metin Özsoy, the former Van representative of TÜGVA, said, "There are over 100 TÜGVA members in the Ministry of Justice that only I know. These names were brought here through the foundation. I don't know how many there are in the police force, but I know that TÜGVA has a very serious role in the recruitment of guards." In addition, TÜGVA president Enes Eminoğlu was a guest on journalist Cüneyt Özdemir's program to respond to the allegations in question, but he made a blunder in the program, saying, "This man took documents from inside. He made a backup for himself, manipulated and changed the correct documents, and now he is disclosing them.", confirming the accuracy of the documents.

== Projects ==
- İhtisas Akademi
- Medya İletişim Okulu
- Genç Yönetici Okulu
- Kitap Kurdu Yarışması
- Türkiye Fikir Kongresi
- Genç Diplomat Akademisi
- Genç Türkiye Kongresi
- Hızlı Olan Kazansın
- Türkiye Fikir Akademisi
- Yaztahtaya projesi
