= Emine Erdoğan =

First Lady of Turkey since 2014

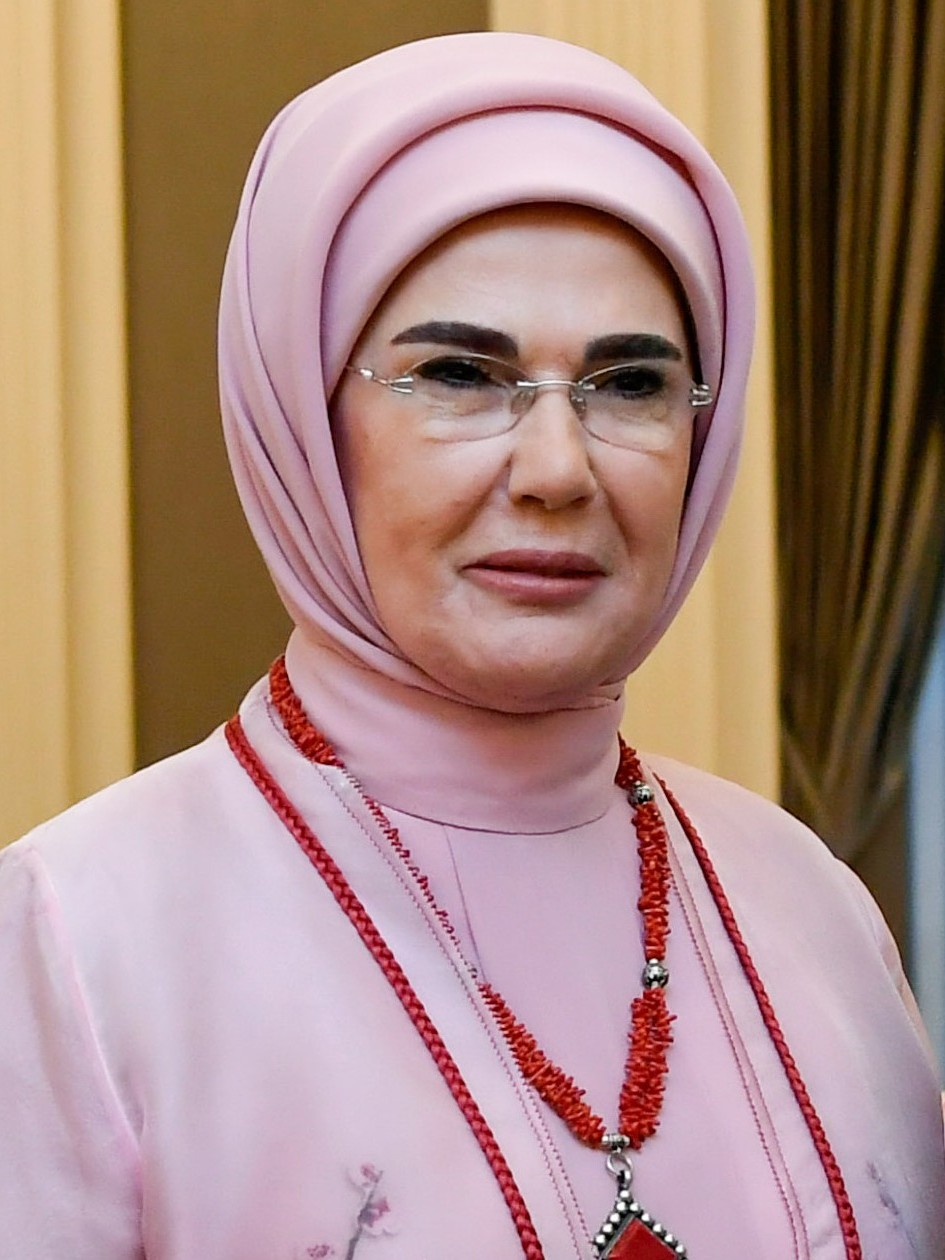
- Erdoğan in 2023

First Lady of Turkey
- Current
- Assumed role 28 August 2014
- President: Recep Tayyip Erdoğan
- Preceded by: Hayrünnisa Gül

Spouse of the Prime Minister of Turkey
- In role 14 March 2003 – 28 August 2014
- Prime Minister: Recep Tayyip Erdoğan
- Preceded by: Hayrünnisa Gül
- Succeeded by: Sare Kundak

Personal details
- Born: Emine Gülbaran; 16 February 1955 (age 71) Üsküdar, Istanbul, Turkey
- Party: Justice and Development Party
- Spouse: Recep Tayyip Erdoğan (m. 1978)
- Children: Ahmet; Bilal; Esra; Sümeyye
- Relatives: Berat Albayrak; Selçuk Bayraktar; (sons-in-law)

Emine Erdoğan (Note: Turkish: [emine ˈæɾdoan], née [ɟylbaɾan]) (née Gülbaran; born 16 February 1955) is the current first lady of Turkey as the wife of President Recep Tayyip Erdoğan.

Born in Üsküdar, Istanbul, her family originates from Siirt and is of Arab origin. She attended Istanbul Mithatpaşa Vocational Evening School for Girls but did not graduate, and became involved in social activities from a young age. Gülbaran married Recep Tayyip Erdoğan in 1978, and they have four children. She became active in politics as a founding member of the Provincial Women's Branch Administrative Board of the Welfare Party and later participated in social responsibility initiatives after her husband became Mayor of Istanbul. She has supported and led projects focused on education, women and children, social development, humanitarian aid, environmental conservation and zero waste, including campaigns promoting girls' schooling and early childhood education. Erdoğan has also received international recognition, including the Nishan-e-Pakistan, while attracting controversy over her use of luxury goods.

== Early and personal life ==
=== Early life ===
Emine Erdoğan was born as Cemal and Hayriye Gülbaran’s fifth child and only daughter in Üsküdar, Istanbul. Her family is originally from Siirt and is of Arab origin.

She was educated at Istanbul Mithatpaşa Vocational Evening School for Girls. She did not graduate, however. She has been actively involved in social activities since her youth. Erdoğan was among the founding members of the "Idealist Women’s Association", which she named herself. She closely followed the events organized by the National Turkish Student Union and the Ladies Foundation for Science and Culture. During this period, she met Recep Tayyip Erdoğan and married him.

=== Personal life ===
Recep Tayyip Erdoğan and Emine Gülbaran married on 4 July 1978. The couple has four children: Ahmet Burak, Necmettin Bilal, Esra, and Sümeyye.

== Political career ==
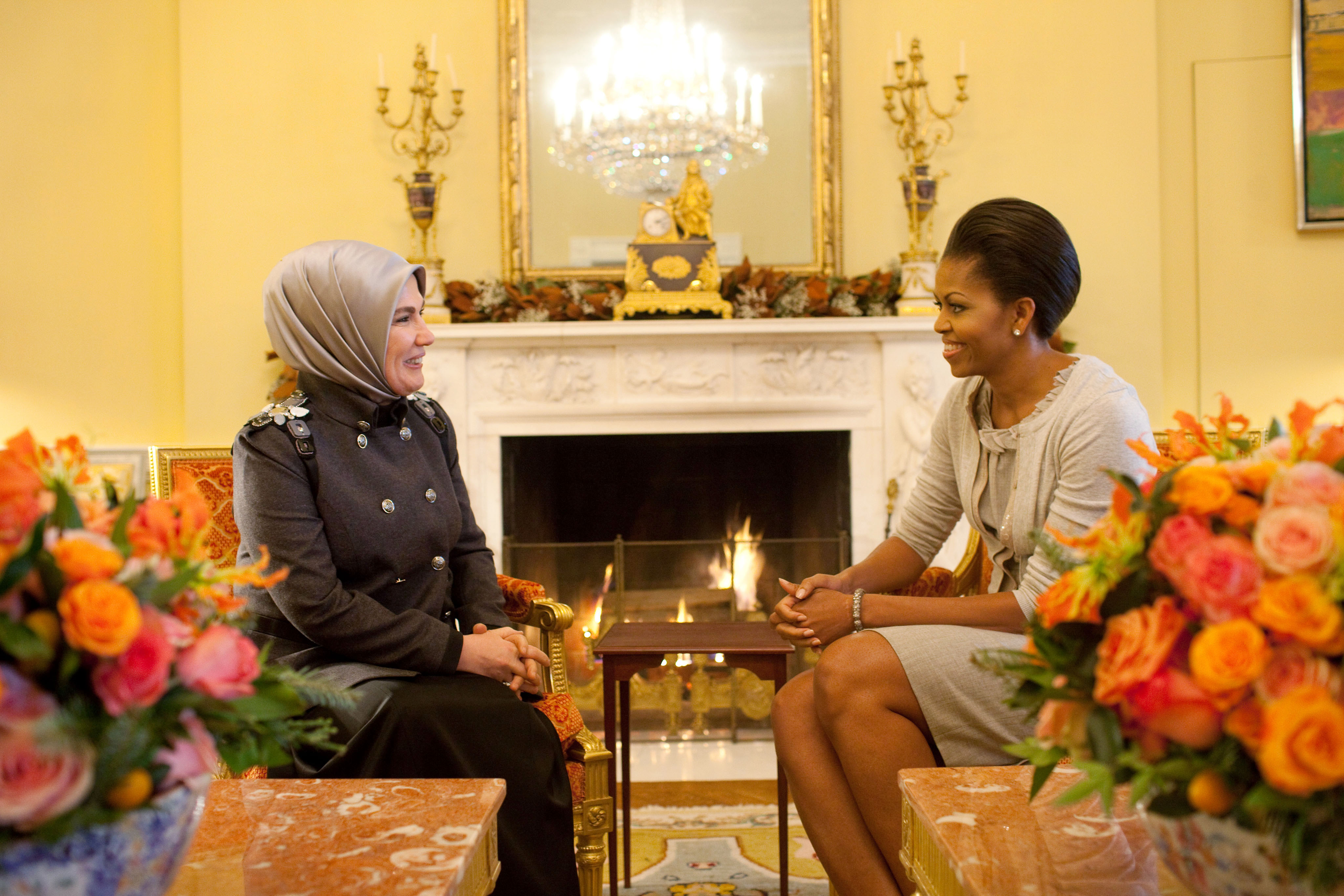
Emine Erdoğan meets with Michelle Obama in the Yellow Oval Room, White House, December 2009

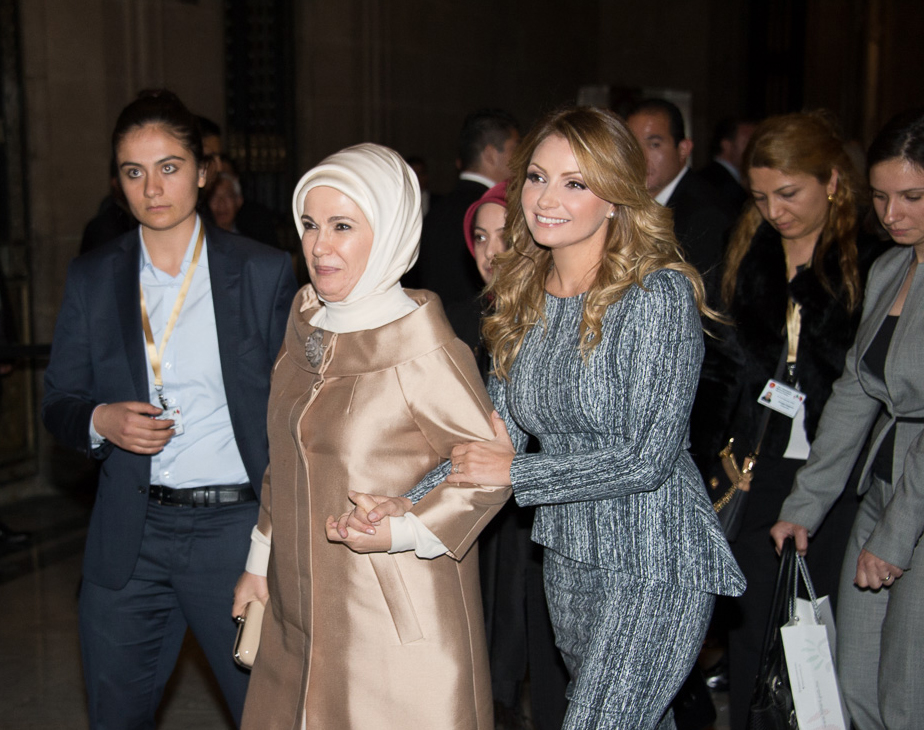
Erdoğan together with Mexican First Lady Angélica Rivera in Mexico, February 2015

Erdoğan served as a founding member of the Provincial Women's Branch Administrative Board of the Welfare Party when Recep Tayyip Erdoğan was elected the Istanbul Provincial Head and she pioneered an era that paved the way for women's active participation in politics in Turkey. She launched a women's movement, which contributed to the success of the Refah Party in the 1994 elections.

After her husband Recep Tayyip Erdoğan was elected Mayor of Istanbul, she took part in various social responsibility projects. She contributed to the establishment of an aid corridor between different social groups by initiating the "iftar tables where the poor and the rich meet" tradition, which is still carried on by the mayoralties of Justice and Development Party.

Erdoğan led the foundation of the "Center for Social Development" (TOGEM) in 2005 and has supported projects concerning the education of women and children.

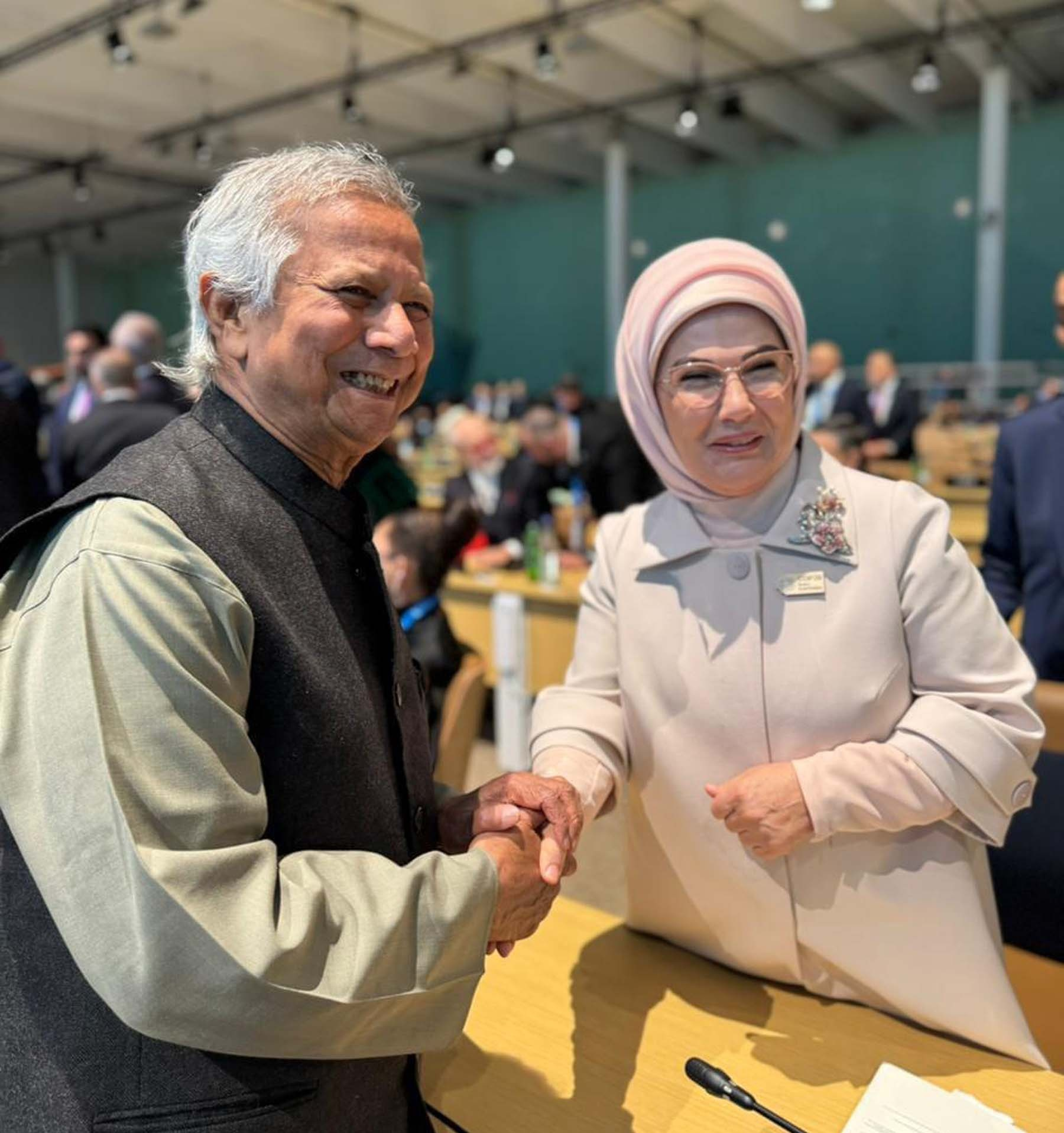
Professor Muhammad Yunus and Emine Erdoğan At COP29

With the wives of the governors from all Turkish provinces, she has led a campaign to improve the living conditions of the women, the elderly, the veterans and families of the martyrs. The project, which was awarded the "Golden Compass", the academy award of public relations, in the best public project category, has attracted interest among the projects cited by the United Nations. The project has continued under the auspices Erdoğan since 2012.

After the attacks against Gaza in 2009, she hosted the wives of the Western and Arab leaders and called the whole world to "stop the war." In 2012, Erdoğan personally went to Myanmar to observe the situation there despite the critical security threats and provided humanitarian aid to the region.

Emine Erdoğan has played an active role in opposing child marriage, stating clearly that "Forced child marriage is clearly unacceptable under any conditions".

=== Projects under Emine Erdoğan's aegis ===
==== Voluntary Envoys ====
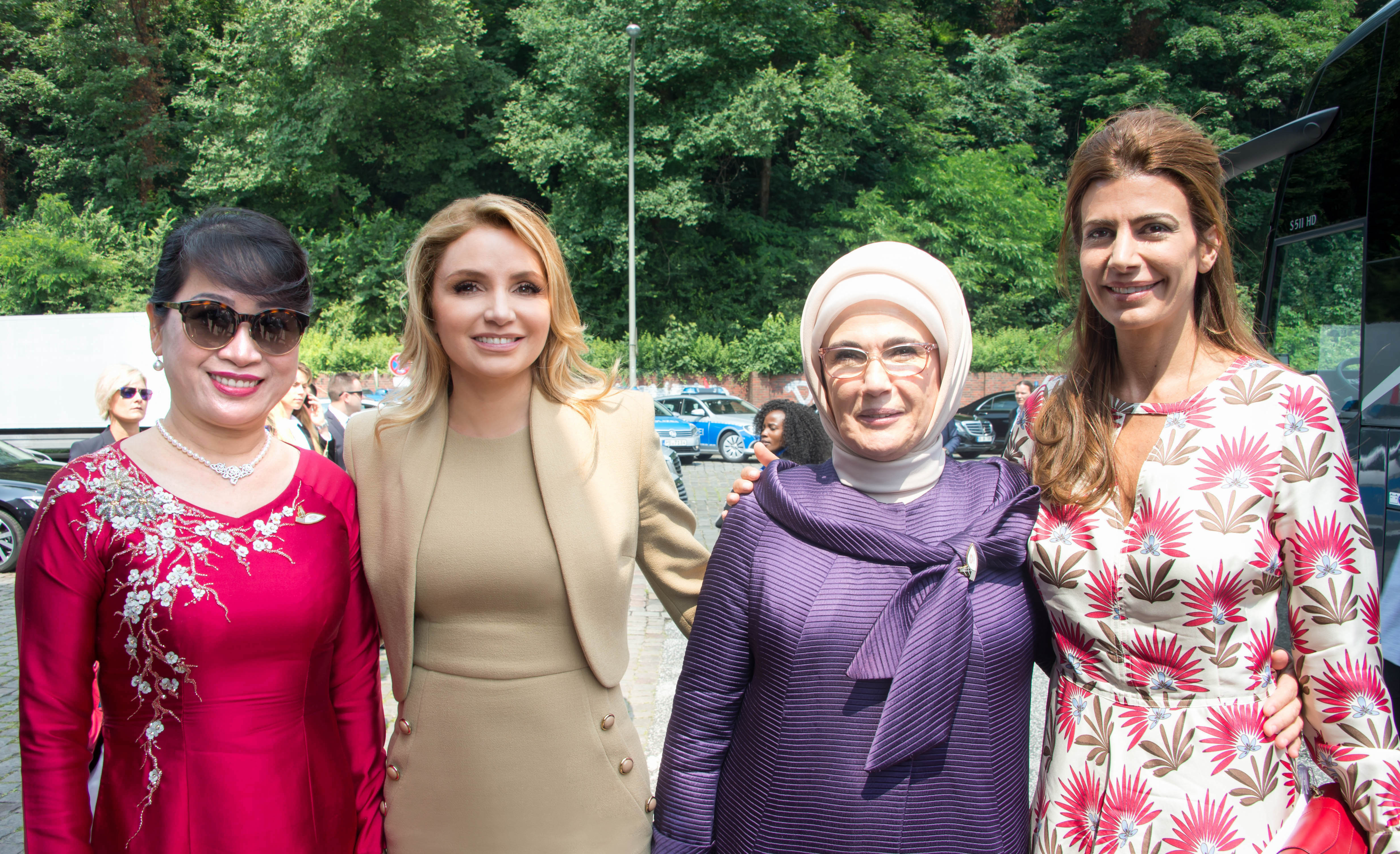
Erdoğan together with Vietnamese First Lady Nguyệt Thu, Mexican First Lady Angélica Rivera and Argentine First Lady Juliana Awada, July 2017

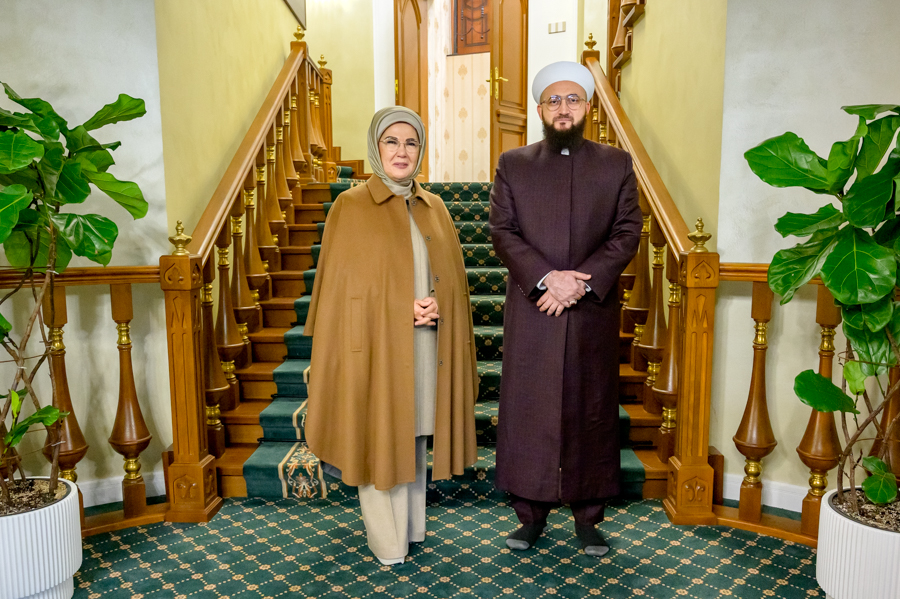
Emine Erdoğan visiting the Märcani Mosque in Kazan, Tatarstan, October 2024. With her is the Mufti of Tatarstan, Kamil Səmiğullin.

"The Voluntary Envoys in Social Development Project" (Turkish: Gönül Elçileri), implemented by the Ministry of Family and Social Policies and supported by Emine Erdoğan, is a social responsibility project focused on raising awareness about and promoting "volunteering", and tending to the human resource needs that will contribute to social development. The venture, running since 2012, has subfields such as “Protective Family Service” and “Vocational Training for Women”.

==== Come On Girls, Let's Go To School ====
With the Ministry of National Education, Erdoğan launched a country-wide campaign to resolve the issue of the girls who were not allowed to go to school by their families. "Come on Girls, Let's Go to School" (Turkish: Haydi Kızlar Okula) is a project carried out in coordination with the Ministry of National Education and UNICEF with support and commitments of relevant public institutions, NGOs and local administrations. The goal of the project is to provide 100% schooling and gender equality in education for primary-school-age girls (6–14 years) who are out of the education system, who have left or are absent from school.

==== Mothers and Daughters at School ====
Erdoğan continued her efforts in education with "Mothers and Daughters at School" campaign (Turkish: Ana-Kız Okuldayız), which she named herself. The campaign, launched by the Ministry of National Education, was initiated in 2008. The target audience of the project are young girls and women who are in poverty from a socio-economic perspective, who have not had access to educational opportunities, and are over the compulsory education age.

==== 7 Is Too Late ====
The "7 is too late" campaign (Turkish: 7 Çok Geç) is carried out by the Mother Child Education Foundation (AÇEV) with the objective of raising awareness and bolster on the significance of early childhood education, which children ought to get between the ages of 0-6, and making sure that every child in Turkey can benefit from pre-school education.

==== Prolific Forests ====
On March 21, 2015, on the International Day of Forests, the project "Prolific Forests" (Turkish: Bereket Ormanları) was initiated by the Ministry of Forestry and Water Affairs which aims to expand green areas in Turkey and to make effective use of forests.

==== I Protect My Future ====
"I Protect My Future" project (Turkish: Geleceğimi Koruyorum), started with the cooperation of the Ministry of National Education and the Ministry of Agriculture and Forestry, aims to raise awareness about the conservation of earth and water resources among the new generations. The project which has been launched in 30 cities aims to make children familiar with the earth, seed and plants.

==== African Handicrafts Market and Culture House ====
"African Handicrafts Market and Culture House" project (Turkish: Afrika El Sanatları Pazarı ve Kültür Evi) strives to contribute to the solution of African women's problems concerning education and healthcare through profit-free marketing of products handmade by African women. Moreover, the project has the goal of functioning as a meeting point of African cultures and contributing to the deepening of Turkey-Africa relations.

==== Zero Waste ====
The "Zero Waste" Project (Turkish: Sıfır Atık), directed by the Ministry of Environment and Urban Planning, has the objective to prevent squandering, to reduce the waste amount and to encourage waste recycling. It also aims for the installation of an effective collection system. Erdoğan is the first chair of the United Nations Advisory Board of Eminent Persons on Zero Waste, which shares good practices internationally, including reducing methane emissions from waste management.

== Luxury items controversy ==
In 2019, some photos of her appeared holding a Hermès handbag, amid calls for French goods boycott. She filed suit against the journalist Ekşi Sözlük for posting negative comments about her related to the luxury bag.

In June 2020, a court ordered to block access to the Sözlük webpages that focus on Emine Erdoğan wearing an Hermès handbag. In the same month, Evrensel journalist Ender İmrek had to appear in court to face an accusation for not reporting positively on her while criticizing her for wearing a Hermès bag worth $50,000.

In September 2021, she also drew attention for wearing a Chopard brand watch that starts at $35,000.

== Honours and accolades ==
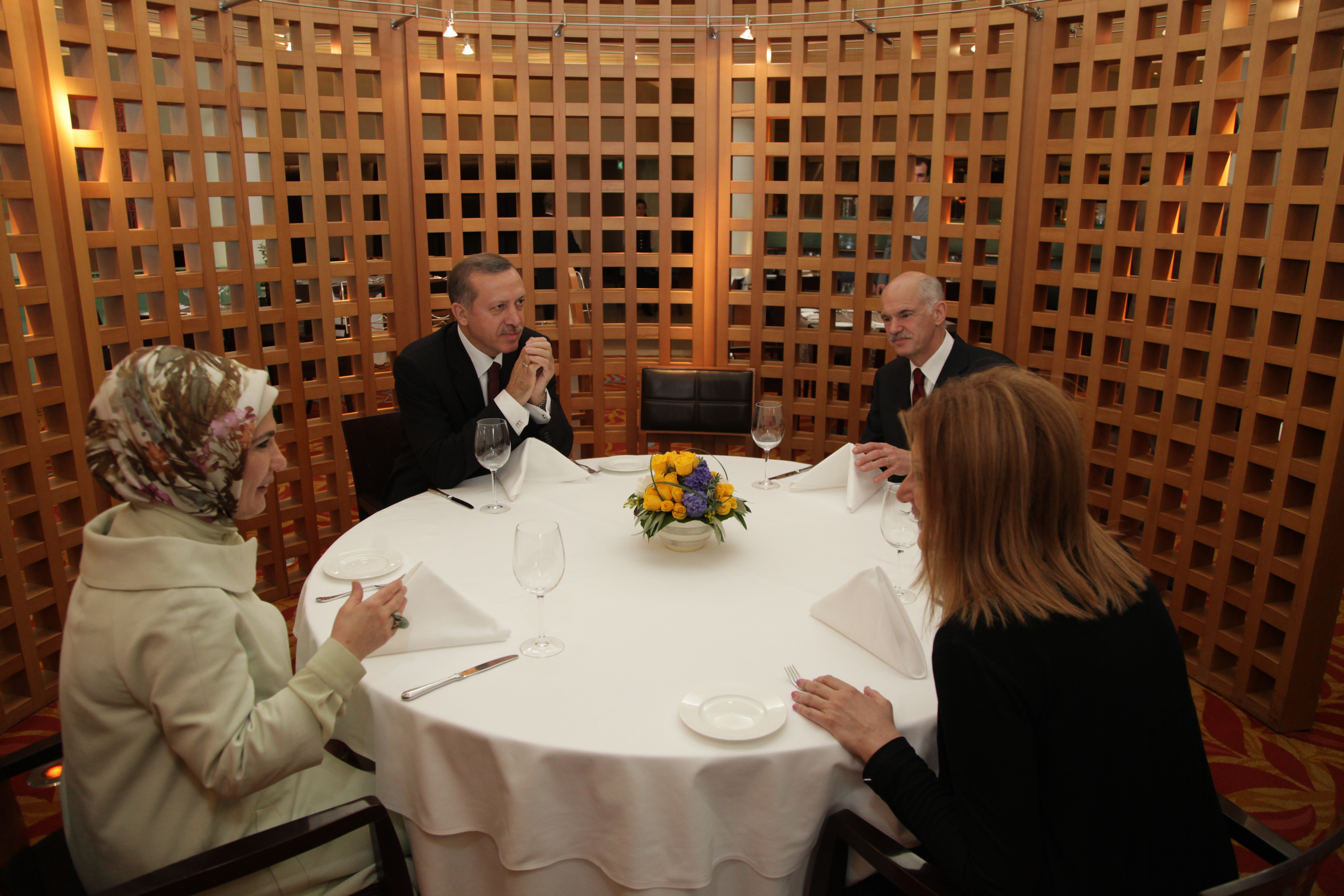
The Erdoğans with Greek Prime Minister George Papandreou and his wife in Greece, May 2010

On 7 December 2010, Prime Minister of Pakistan Syed Yousaf Raza Gilani conferred the Pakistani Nishan-e-Pakistan on Emine Erdoğan, in recognition of her efforts for the flood-stricken people of Pakistan. In October 2010, Erdoğan visited Pakistan and the flood hit areas to witness the devastation caused by the floods and contributed significantly in the fund-raising campaign to help the country's flood victims.

On 16 February 2011, Emine Erdoğan was presented with the "Prix de la Fondation" by the Crans Montana Forum at a ceremony in Brussels.

== Notes ==
Honorary titles
Preceded by Hayrünnisa Gül	First Lady of Turkey; 2014–present	Incumbent
