= Lutfiya al-Qaba'ili =

Libyan journalist and short story writer (born 1948)

- لطيفة القبائلي
- Born: 1948 (age 77–78); Libya
- Education: Al-Fatih University (Geography)
- Occupations: Journalist, short story writer
- Years active: 1960s–present
- Notable work: Amani mu'allaba (Canned Hopes)

Lutfiya al-Qaba'ili (born 1948) is a Libyan journalist and short story writer.

Al-Qaba-ili is possessed of a degree in geography from al-Fatih University, and for several years edited al-Bayt magazine; she has continued to work in the media since. Her career as a writer of short fiction began in the mid-1960s, when she found herself writing numerous pieces which she later collected for publication. Her book Amani mu'allaba (Canned Hopes) was published in Tripoli in 1977.
