= Aydin Rajabov =

Azerbaijani carpet artist

Aydin Rajabov Aydın Rəcəbov
- Born: April 9, 1944 (age 81); Baku, Azerbaijan SSR, USSR
- Education: Azerbaijan State Art School; Azerbaijan State Institute of Arts
- Known for: carpet artist
- Awards: Honored Artist of the Azerbaijan SSR; Soltan Mahammad Award

Aydin Mahammad-agha (Mammadagha) oghlu Rajabov (Azerbaijani: Aydın Məhəmməd-Ağa (Məmmədağa) oğlu Rəcəbov; born April 9, 1944) is an Azerbaijani carpet artist, head of the Decorative and Applied Arts Department of the Union of Artists of Azerbaijan, and an Honoured Artist of the Republic of Azerbaijan.

== Biography ==
Aydin Rajabov was born on April 9, 1944, in Baku. He graduated from the Azerbaijan State Art School named after A. Azimzade in 1966, and in the same year entered the Faculty of Architecture at the Azerbaijan Polytechnic Institute. From his second year, he continued his studies in the Carpet Department of the Azerbaijan State Institute of Arts named after M. A. Aliyev, graduating in 1972.

The artist became a member of the Artists' Union of the USSR in 1975, and a member of the Presidium of the Union of Artists of Azerbaijan in 1991. In 2012, he was appointed head of the Decorative and Applied Arts Department of the Union of Artists of Azerbaijan.

== Career ==
Rajabov was a student of the renowned carpet artist Latif Karimov. He developed his own distinctive style, combining traditional motifs with modern artistic expression. In his carpet and pattern work, he draws inspiration from poetry, medieval miniature art and the compositional traditions of Azerbaijan. Notable works include "Shirin's Arrival in Bisotun", "Spring Girl", "Oriental Beauty", "Ud Performer", "Chovken Game" and "Shahin Elchiliyi".

Other significant works include "Astrologers", "Fig Tree", "Dervish Cavalry", "Dur Horse", "White Camel Carrying the Sun", "Sacrificial Ram", "Old Farmer", "Abstract Gimil", "World Tree or Almond Tree", "Simurg", "Phaeton Driver" and "Interlocutors Men".

Rajabov held solo exhibitions in Baku and Stockholm in 2005.

He has participated in numerous national and international exhibitions, and his works are held in the museums of Azerbaijan as well as in various private collections in Germany, Turkey, Italy, Spain, Switzerland, France and other countries.

== Awards ==
- Honored Artist of the Republic of Azerbaijan—December 29, 2006
- "Soltan Mahammad" Award — 2007
