= Lütfiye Aydın =

Turkish educator

Lütfiye Aydın (born 1949) is a Turkish school teacher and short story writer.

== Life ==
Lütfiye Aydın was born in Gaziantep in 1949. After finishing her primary and secondary education in Gaziantep, she studied at the Turkish language Department of the Teacher's College in Buca, İzmir Province graduating in 1972. In 1985, she published her first short story book İkili Yalnızlık.

She was severely wounded in the 1993 Sivas massacre along with her husband. The trauma during the incident caused her to forget reading and writing, and she was forced to re-learn language from scratch.

== Works ==
- İkili Yalnızlık (1985)
- Cemre (1990)
- Sengisemayi Bir Ölüm (1992)
- Ölüm Erken Bir Akşamdır (1993)
- Kül Tablet (1997)
- Tsunami (1998)
- Gri Gül (2005)
- Anka Kentim Antep'im (2008)
- Aşkın Ne Derin (2016)
- Dehanın Sesi (2016)

== Awards ==
- 1998 Kültür Bakanlığı Öykü Büyük Ödülü [Ministry of Culture Short Story Grand Prize] (Tsunami)
- 2005 Rıfat Ilgaz Öykü Ödülü [Rıfat Ilgaz Short Story Award] (Gri Gül)
