= Penitents Compete =

2009 planned Turkish television series

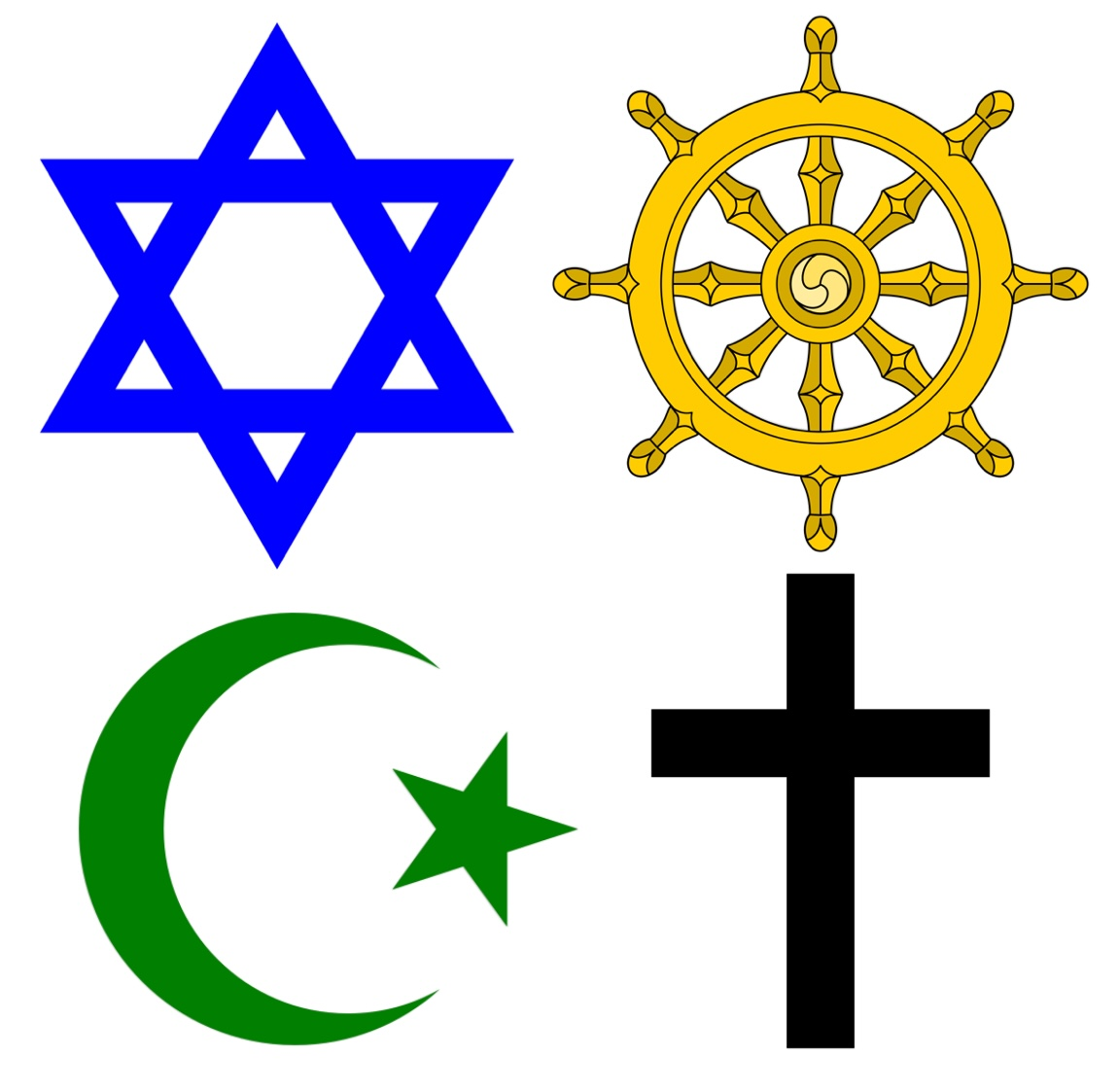
Religious symbols representing the faiths on Penitents Compete. From top left, clockwise: the Jewish Star of David, the dharmacakra, the Christian cross, and the Islamic star and crescent.

Penitents Compete (Turkish: Tövbekarlar Yarışıyor) was a planned 2009 Turkish reality television series in which a Jewish rabbi, a Buddhist monk, an Eastern Orthodox priest, and a Muslim imam were to attempt to convert a group of 10 atheists each week. It was scheduled to begin airing in September 2009 on Turkey's channel T, with the launch intentionally delayed until after Ramadan ended. After the Presidency of Religious Affairs denied permission for an imam to appear, the programme appears to have been cancelled.

== Overview ==
Kanal T's Deputy Director Ahmet Özdemir has said that the goal of the show is "to turn disbelievers into [believers in] God," but that which God they choose is up to them. He also believes that the show will be helpful for those interested in learning about other religions. Any converts will be offered a free pilgrimage to one of four holy sites – Mecca, Vatican City, Jerusalem, or Tibet. The newly converted will be followed by a camera crew to ensure that the trip is a pilgrimage and not a vacation. 200 atheists had already applied as of July 5, 2009, and were being pre-vetted by an eight-person team of theologians to ensure that they truly were atheists, and not simply seeking to gain fame or fortune.

Seyhan Soylu developed the show, which will be produced by Ayşe Hatun Önal and hosted by Gülgün Feyman. Ali Bardakoğlu, the head of the Diyanet İşleri Başkanlığı (Presidency of Religious Affairs) in Turkey, has stated that no Turkish imam will be allowed to participate in the show. Soylu responded by stating that Bosniaks, Azerbaijanis or Tunisian imams would be used instead if need be, and also claimed that Bardakoğlu was "committing a sin" by not providing the show with an imam. Advertisements for the show read: "You will find serenity in this competition," "We give you the biggest prize ever; we represent the belief in God," "Believe, repent, God will forgive you", and "We reconcile opposite poles."

As the BBC reports, "The programme has prompted a mixed reaction in mainly Muslim Turkey, with some saying it would be good for interfaith relations and others saying such discussions were 'inappropriate' for television." Hakkı Devrim, a television commentator and columnist for Radikal, said the idea insulted religion. "Religion is not a science, and it is not open to discussion," Devrim said in an interview for Hürriyet, expressing concerns that atheists would receive a forum to express their views. He "advised Kanal T not to take the risk of airing such a show in Turkey". Professor Mustafa Çağrıcı, an Istanbul mufti, has also expressed concerns about religion being discussed on television, worrying that it would confuse people and "have negative consequences". According to the Jerusalem Post, "Jewish authorities...are vehemently opposed to the program, since according to Halacha, active proselytizing is forbidden." Rabbi David Rosen, director of the American Jewish Committee's Department for Interreligious Affairs, said in an interview about the show, "[a]s a Jew, it is against our world outlook to seek to proselytize". More generally, he stated that he thought the show was "tasteless": "Matters of faith, profession and lifestyle commitment are not something that should be decided on a reality show." However, sociologist Nilüfer Narlı from Bahçeşehir University has said that the show demonstrates a "rising curiosity toward religion" over the past 10 years in Turkey. The Guardian and CBC News have remarked some people may see the show as promoting a further intolerance towards atheists in Turkey, a secular country where a large majority of the population is deeply religious. The opposition of the ruling Justice and Development Party has accused the show of having a secret "Islamist agenda", which the series has denied.

== See also ==
- List of television series canceled before airing an episode
