= Beştepe People's Mosque =

Mosque in Yenimahalle, Ankara, Turkey

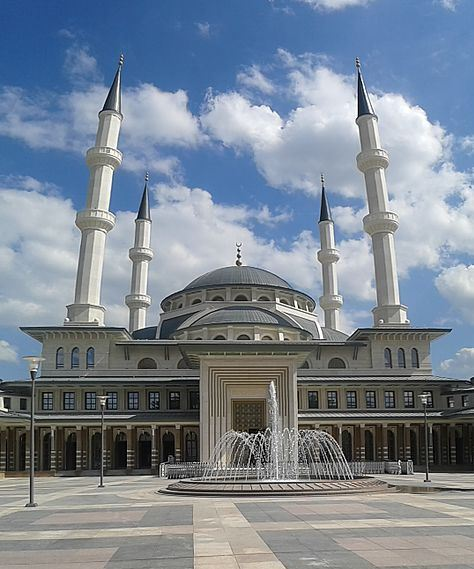

Religion
- Ecclesiastical or organisational status: Active
- Year consecrated: 3 July 2015

Location
- Location: Yenimahalle, Ankara, Turkey
- Interactive map of Beştepe People's Mosque

Architecture
- Minaret: 4

Beştepe People's Mosque (Turkish: Beştepe Millet Camii) or People's Mosque is a mosque with a capacity of 3,000 people, located within the Presidential Complex in the Beştepe neighborhood of the Yenimahalle district in Ankara, Turkey. The Presidential Palace, which serves as the residence of President of the Republic of Turkey Recep Tayyip Erdoğan, is also located within the complex. The mosque was opened for worship on 3 July 2015. Its inauguration took place immediately before the Friday prayer. The mosque has four minarets, each 60 meters tall and featuring two balconies (şerefe). Its floor area is 5,117 square meters, and its main dome is surrounded by four semi-domes.

At the mosque's inauguration, President Recep Tayyip Erdoğan stated: "I believe that this mosque, both through its architecture and its position within the overall complex, will make very important contributions to the region, Ankara, and our country." In addition to Erdoğan, the inauguration ceremony was attended by the then-Speaker of the Grand National Assembly of Turkey (TBMM), İsmet Yılmaz; the then-Prime Minister of Turkey, Ahmet Davutoğlu; Deputy Prime Minister Numan Kurtulmuş; the President of the Presidency of Religious Affairs, Prof. Dr. Mehmet Görmez; ministers; and numerous members of parliament.
