= Religion in Turkey =

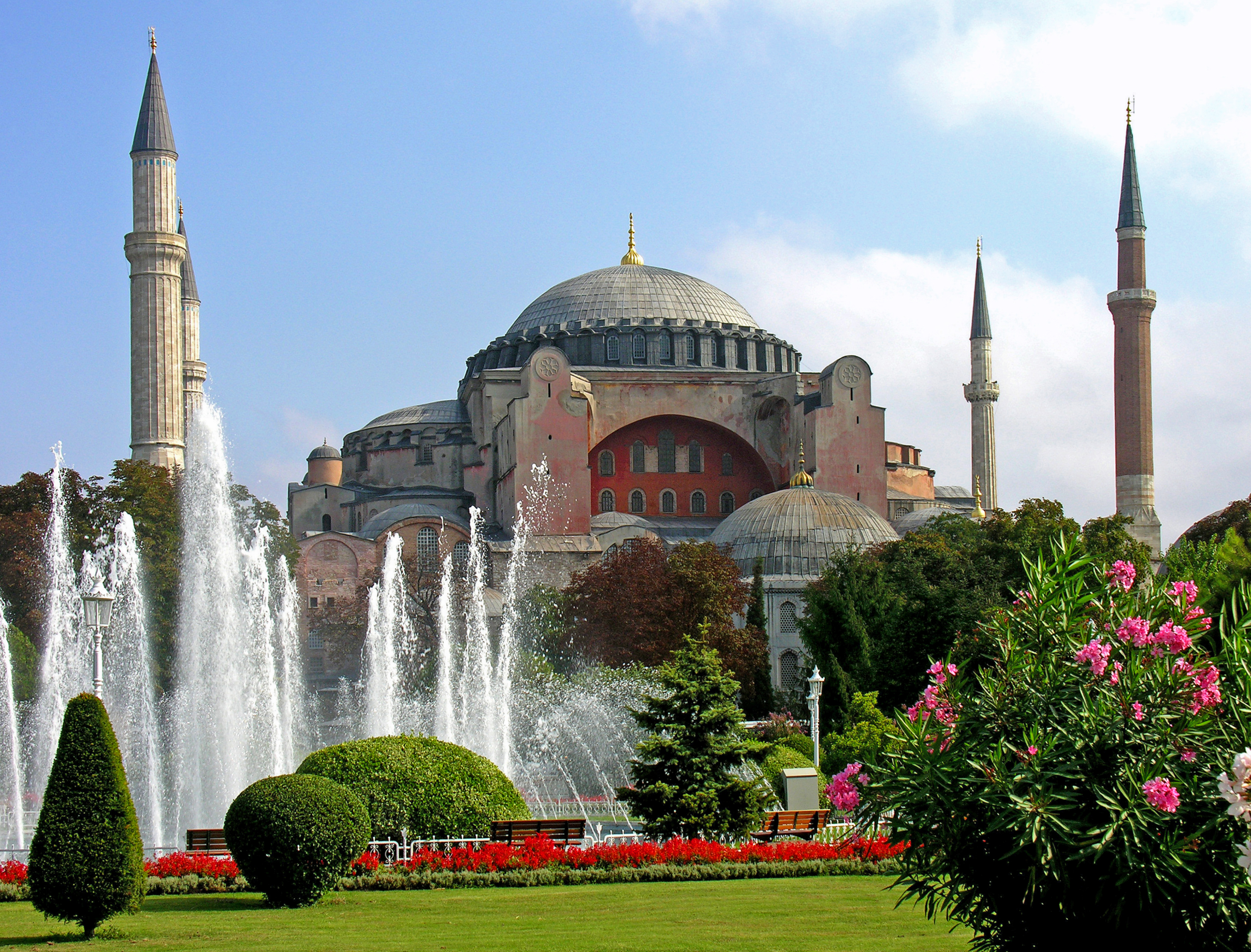
- Turkey's most recognizable religious building, the Hagia Sophia. Now used as a mosque, this building was originally built as a church in Constantinople in the 6th century by Emperor Justinian of the Byzantine Empire.

Religion in Turkey (Pew 2025 Report)
1. Islam (95%)
2. Other (5%)

Religion in Turkey consists of various religious beliefs. Turkey is officially a secular state and various surveys claim Islam as the country's most common religion. In the official records, 99.8% of the population is initially registered as Muslim, and the remaining 0.2% are Christians and adherents of other officially recognised religions such as Judaism. However, because the government registers everyone as Muslim at birth by default, the official statistics can be misleading. There are many people who follow other religions or do not adhere to any religion, yet they are officially classified as 'Muslim' in official records unless they make a contrary claim. These records can be changed or even blanked out on the request of the citizen using a valid electronic signature to sign the electronic application. Most surveys estimate the percentage to be around 94 to 98% of Turkey self-identified as Muslim.

Turkey was historically a religiously diverse country. On the eve of World War I, the Ottoman Empire (predecessor of today's Turkey) had a 20% non-Muslim population. This population significantly decreased following the late Ottoman genocides, population exchange between Greece and Turkey and emigration of Jews and Christians.

Turkey has officially been a secular country since the 1928 amendment of its 1924 constitution. This was later strengthened with the wider application of laicism by President Mustafa Kemal Atatürk during the mid-1930s, as part of the Republican reforms. The rights of Armenian Apostolic, Greek Orthodox, and Jewish citizens were codified under the Treaty of Lausanne. Although the Turkish state claims the freedom and security of all religious groups, religious minorities in Turkey have continued to face discrimination and persecution.

Beginning in the 1980s, the role of religion in the state has been a divisive issue, as influential religious factions challenged the complete secularization called for by Kemalism and the observance of Islamic practices experienced a substantial revival. After the 1980 Turkish coup d'état, strict regulations on religious insignia in the public sector, including a ban on Islamic attire, were imposed in 1982. In the early 2000s, Islamic groups challenged the concept of a secular state with increasing vigour after Recep Tayyip Erdoğan's Islamist-rooted Justice and Development Party (AKP) came into power in 2002.

While the state is officially secular, all primary and secondary schools have been required to teach religious studies since 1982, and the curriculum focuses mainly on Sunni Islam. The extent to which other religions are covered depends on the school and students can be exempt from these classes on-demand. These policies have been met with controversy and criticism by both the foreign media and the Turkish public. The high school curriculum, however, teaches religious studies through a philosophy course and incorporates more information about other religions. The country also has public Islamic schools called İmam Hatip schools, which came to prominence in the 1950s.

== Organizations ==
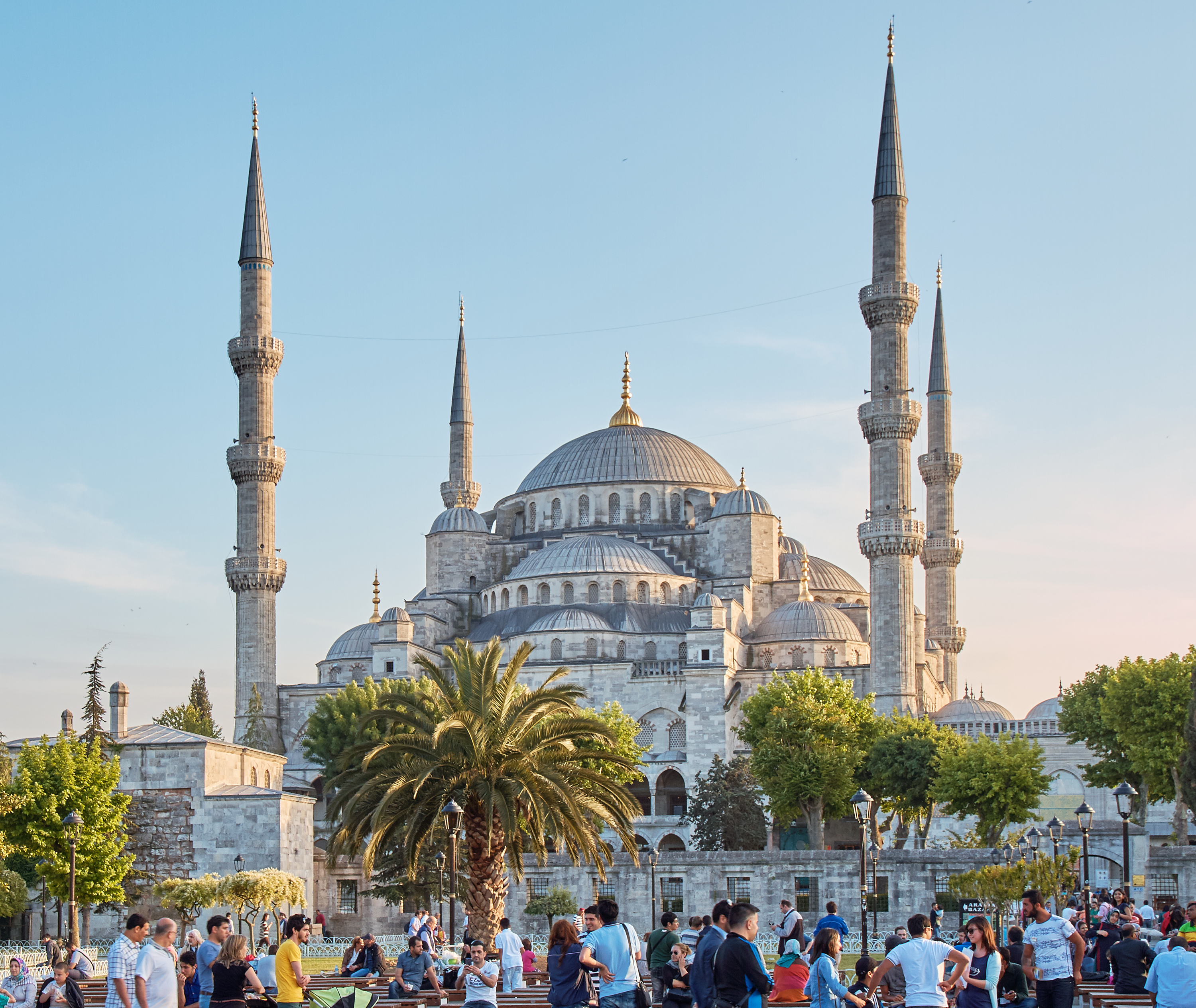
The Blue Mosque, Istanbul, Turkey.

The mainstream Hanafi school of Sunni Islam is largely organised by the state, through the Presidency of Religious Affairs (Turkish: Diyanet İşleri Başkanlığı), which controls all mosques and pays the salaries of all Muslim clerics and scholars. Alevism is presided over by the 'Alevi-Bektashi Cultural Presidency' under the Ministry of Culture and Tourism.

The Ecumenical Patriarch of Constantinople (Patrik) is the head of the Greek Orthodox Church in Turkey. It also serves as the spiritual leader of all Orthodox churches worldwide. The Armenian Patriarch is the head of the Armenian Church in Turkey, while the Jewish community is led by the Hahambaşı, Turkey's Chief Rabbi, based in Istanbul.

== Statistics ==
Belief in God (TFRS study, 2023, figure 1)
1. God exists (94.3%)
2. God doesn't exist (5.70%)

According to a 2025 report from Pew Research Center, 95% of Turkey self identified as Muslim. Most Muslims in Turkey are Sunni Muslims forming about 85–90%, and Shia-Aleviler (Alevis, Alawites, and Ja'faris) denominations in total form up to 10% of the Muslim population. Among Shia Muslim presence in Turkey there is a small but considerable minority of Muslims with Ismaili heritage and affiliation. Christians (Oriental Orthodoxy, Greek Orthodox and Armenian Apostolic) and Jews (Sephardi), who comprise the non-Muslim religious population, make up about 0.2% of the total. The Alawites in Turkey are in extension of the Alawite community in Syria and are Arab they follow the Shia branch of Islam. In 2023, it was found that 94% of those who took part in the survey Identified as believing in God and 1.5% did not believe in god, 2.5% were not sure god exists and 1.7% did not believe in a personal god but believed in a higher power. According to the same study 62% Identified with the Hanafi school of thought, 15.1% said they were Non-denominational Muslim, 9.6% refused to give an answer, 9% followed the Shafi'i school of thought, 3.1% Identified with the Alevism sect, 0.2% with the Hanbali school of thought, 0.2% with the Maliki school of thought, 0.2% with the Ja'fari school of thought and 0.6% said other.

According to a poll made by MAK (Mehmet Ali Kulat of Ankara), 86% of those who did the poll, declared they believe in God. 76% declared they believe Quran and other holy books came through revelation by God, while 14% said that they don't believe that it did, and 10% did not answer.

Another recent poll by OPTİMAR which interviewed 3,500 people in 26 cities, included a question about belief in God and found that 89.5% of the Turkish population believed in God, 4.5% believed in God but did not belong to an organized religion, 2.7% were agnostic, 1.7% were atheist, and 1.1% did not answer.

According to a survey by the pollster KONDA, the percentage of atheists in Turkey has tripled in 10 years and rose from 1% in 2008 to 3% in 2018, the percentage of non-believers or agnostics rose from 1% to 2%, and that 90% of irreligious Turks were under 35 years old. The survey was conducted in Turkey through face-to-face interviews with 5,793 people in their households, in April, 2018 while in 2008 6,482 people were interviewed in face-to-face in Turkey.

Muslim and non-Muslim population in Turkey, 1914–2005 (in thousands)
Year	1914	1927	1945	1965	1990	2005
Muslims	12,941	13,290	18,511	31,139	56,860	71,997
Greeks	1,549	110	104	76	8	3
Armenians	1,204	77	60	64	67	50
Jews	128	82	77	38	29	27
Others	176	71	38	74	50	45
Total	15,997	13,630	18,790	31,391	57,005	72,120
Percentage non-Muslim	19.1	2.5	1.5	0.8	0.3	0.2

Situation of religions in Turkey
Religions	Estimated population	Expropriation measures	Official recognition through the Constitution or international treaties	Government Financing of places of worship and religious staff
Sunni Islam – Hanafi	~85% of the population	No	Yes, by the Article 136	Yes (Note: This financing only covers the staff and permits. Electricity, water and other expenses are covered by citizen donations.) through the Presidency of Religious Affairs
Sunni Islam – Shafi'i	~85% of the population	No	Yes, by the Article 136	Yes through the Presidency of Religious Affairs
Shia Islam – Alevism	~3% to ~15%	Yes	Only by local municipalities, not constutituonal	Yes (Note: Symbolic financing only to the department. Cemevi expenses are covered by the local municipalities) through Ministry of Culture and Tourism
Shia Islam – Alawism	250,000-1,000,000	Yes	No	No
Shia Islam – Ja'fari	500,000-760,000	Yes	No	No
Christianity – Armenian Patriarchate of Constantinople	~90,000 (Note: Roughly half the population is composed of migrants from Armenia, and the other half is composed of indigenous Turkish citizens of Armenian origin.)	Yes	Yes through the Treaty of Lausanne (1923)	No
Christianity – Syriac Orthodox Church	~25,000	Yes	No	No
Christianity – Latin Catholicism	~25,000	Yes	No	No
Judaism	14,300-15,000	Yes	Yes through the Treaty of Lausanne (1923)	No
Baha'i Faith	~10,000	Unclear	No	No
Christianity – Protestantism	7,000–10,000	Yes	Yes	Yes
Christianity – Greek Orthodox Church of Antioch	7,000–9,000	Yes	Yes through the Treaty of Lausanne (1923)	No
Christianity – Union of the Armenian Evangelical Churches in the Near East	5,600	Yes	Yes through the Treaty of Lausanne (1923)	No
Christianity – Jehovah's Witnesses	5,000	Unclear	No	No
Christianity – Ecumenical Patriarchate of Constantinople	2,000-3,500	Yes	Yes through the Treaty of Lausanne (1923)	No
Christianity – Armenian Catholic Archeparchy of Istanbul	2,000-3,500	Yes	Yes through the Treaty of Lausanne (1923)	No
Christianity – Syriac Catholic Church	2,000	Yes	No	No
Christianity – Chaldean Catholicism	500–3,000	Yes	No	No
Yazidism	<1,000	Unclear	No	No
Christianity – LDS Church	573	Yes	No	No
Christianity – Autocephalous Turkish Orthodox Patriarchate (Note: unrecognized by Eastern Orthodox Church)	4-350	No	Yes through the Treaty of Lausanne (1923)	No
Christianity – Greek Byzantine Catholic Church	16	Yes	Yes through the Treaty of Lausanne (1923)	No

Data from various surveys
Source	Islam	No religion	Christianity	Other religions and no reply
Pew Research Center (2025)	95%	5%	N/A	N/A
KONDA (2024)	92%	8%	N/A	N/A
Report on Faith and Religiosity in Turkey (2023)	94%	6%	N/A	N/A
KONDA (2021)	92%	6%	N/A	2%
Optimar (2019)	89%	8.9%	0.3%	1.1%
World Values Survey (2018)	98.0%	1.2%	N/A	0.8%
MAK (2017)	86%	12.5%	0.5%	1%
Ipsos (2016)	82%	13%	2%	3%
Pew Research Center (2016)	98%	1.2%	0.4%	0.4%
KONDA (2008)	97%	2%	0.2%	0.8%
Sabancı University (2006)	98.3%	1.5%	0.2%	N/A
Government official numbers	99.8%	N/A	0.2%	N/A

=== Religiosity ===
Religiosity among Turkish People (KONDA Research, 2021)
1. Fully Devout (10%)
2. Fully Religious (50%)
3. Not Religious (33%)
4. Non-believers & Atheists (7%)
Distribution of Belief and Religiosity Typologies in Turkey (TFRS study, 2023, chart 5)
1. Mainstream Religious (40.2%)
2. Pious Muslim (30.6%)
3. Secular Muslim (22.2%)
4. Secular non-believer (6.00%)

In a poll conducted by Sabancı University in 2006, 98.3% of Turks revealed they were Muslim. Of that, 19% said they were "extremely religious", 45% said they were "somewhat religious", and 33% said they were "not very religious" and 3% had "no religious beliefs". 3% of Turks declare themselves with no religious beliefs.

According to Pew in 2020, 89% of Turks say religion plays an important role in their life (71% very important, 18% somewhat important), and 8% say religion does not play an important role in their lives (3% not at all important, 5% not too important), 75% of Turks also say it is necessary to believe in God to be moral, compare to 84% in 2002. A 2016 Pew Research Center Report, only 13% of all Turks believe laws should "strictly follow the teachings of the Qur'an."

According to a 2021 study by Kadir Has University, 12.5% of participants identified as 'non-religious', 58% as 'somewhat religious', and 29.5% as 'religious'. In terms of religious practice, 41.6% described themselves as 'non-practicing', 37.2% reported attending only Friday and/or holiday prayers, while 21.2% said they perform all daily prayers.

In 2023, the report Türkiye’de Dindarlık Algısı (“Perceptions of Religiousness in Turkey”), published by Sabancı Üniversitesi's Ankara Enstitüsü and Istanbul Policy Center (IPC) in November 2023, provides detailed findings on self-perceived religiosity in Turkey. Pages 37–39 present three major graphs, examining personal religiosity, religiosity by party preference, and religiosity across demographic groups. Graph 22 (p. 37) asks respondents “How would you describe yourself in terms of religiousness?”. According to the results, in the general population, 21.9% of respondents describe themselves as very religious and 48.2% as religious, totaling 70.1%. A further 15.0% identify as neither religious nor non-religious. Those who describe themselves as not religious account for 6.7%, while 6.0% say they are not religious at all. 2.3% of respondents state that they do not wish to answer. Graph 23 (p. 38) analyzes self-perceived religiosity by party preference. Among AK Parti voters, 39.4% describe themselves as very religious and 52.4% as religious (91.8% combined), while 6.2% did not respond. For MHP voters, 20.7% identify as very religious and 58.5% as religious (79.2%), with 19.4% identifying as neither religious nor non-religious and 1.4% declining to answer. CHP voters show a markedly different profile: 12.3% report being very religious and 34.5% religious (46.8%), 21.2% describe themselves as neither religious nor non-religious, 14.4% as not religious, 15.0% as not religious at all, and 2.6% did not respond. İYİ Party voters report 11.8% very religious and 56.3% religious (68.1%). 12.7% identify as neither, 9.2% as not religious, 3.6% as not religious at all, and 6.4% did not answer. Among HDP voters, 11.0% describe themselves as very religious and 35.3% as religious (46.3%). 11.9% identify as neither religious nor non-religious, 20.9% as not religious, 18.6% as not religious at all, and 2.3% did not respond. Graph 24 (p. 39) presents religiosity across age. Among those aged 18–24, 16.9% identify as very religious and 45.3% as religious (62.2% combined). 22.6% describe themselves as neither religious nor non-religious, while 5.7% say they are not religious and 6.7% not religious at all; 2.7% did not respond. In the 25–34 age group, 26.8% report being very religious and 43.5% religious (70.3% combined). 16.2% identify as neither, 6.5% as not religious, 4.8% as not religious at all, and 2.3% did not answer. Among respondents aged 35–44, 23.4% describe themselves as very religious and 51.1% as religious (74.5%). 16.0% identify as neither religious nor non-religious, 3.5% as not religious, 3.4% as not religious at all, and 2.5% gave no response. For those aged 45–54, 19.1% identify as very religious and 56.1% as religious (75.2%). 11.5% describe themselves as neither, 6.5% as not religious, 4.6% as not religious at all, and 2.2% did not respond. In the 55–64 age group, 19.6% report being very religious and 48.3% religious (67.9%). 11.3% identify as neither religious nor non-religious, 5.4% as not religious, 11.6% as not religious at all, and 3.7% did not answer. Among those aged 65 and over, 23.1% describe themselves as very religious and 43.8% as religious (66.9%). 11.2% identify as neither religious nor non-religious, while 21.9% describe themselves as not religious or not religious at all.

According to the Türkiye’de Dindarlık Algısı report in 2023

percentage	response
9.8%	"A religious person who fully performs the requirements of religion."
61.5%	"A religious person who tries to fulfill the requirements of religion."
18.3%	"A believer who does not fulfill religious requirements."
7.3%	"Not a believer."
3.0%	"No answer."

According to a poll made by OPTİMAR in 2019

percentage	response
89.5%	"I believe in God's existence and oneness." (Theist)
4.5%	"I think there is a Creator, but I am not religious." (Deist)
2.7%	"I'm not sure if there is a Creator." (agnostic)
1.7%	"I don't think there is a Creator." (Atheist)
1.7%	no answer

According to the Pew Research Center report 2015:

percentage	response
61%	religion is "very important" to their lives.
22%	religion is "somewhat important" to their lives.
7%	religion is "not too important" to their lives.
3%	religion is "not at all important" to their lives.

According to the Gallup Poll 2012:

percentage	response
23%	defined themselves as "a religious person".
73%	defined themselves as "not a religious person".
2%	defined themselves as "a convinced atheist".

According to the Eurobarometer Poll 2010:

percentage	response
94%	"I believe there is a God". (theist)
1%	"I believe there is some sort of spirit or life force". (spiritual)
1%	"I do not believe there is any sort of spirit, God, or life force". (neither theist nor spiritual)

According to the KONDA Research and Consultancy survey carried out throughout Turkey in 2007:

percentage	response
52.8%	defined themselves as "a religious person who strives to fulfill religious obligations" (Practicing religious).
34.3%	defined themselves as "a believer who does not fulfill religious obligations" (Religious in the name).
9.7%	defined themselves as "a fully devout person fulfilling all religious obligations" (Fully devout).
2.3%	defined themselves as "someone who does not believe in religious obligations" (Non-believer).
0.9%	defined themselves as "someone with no religious conviction" (Irreligious).

== Islam ==
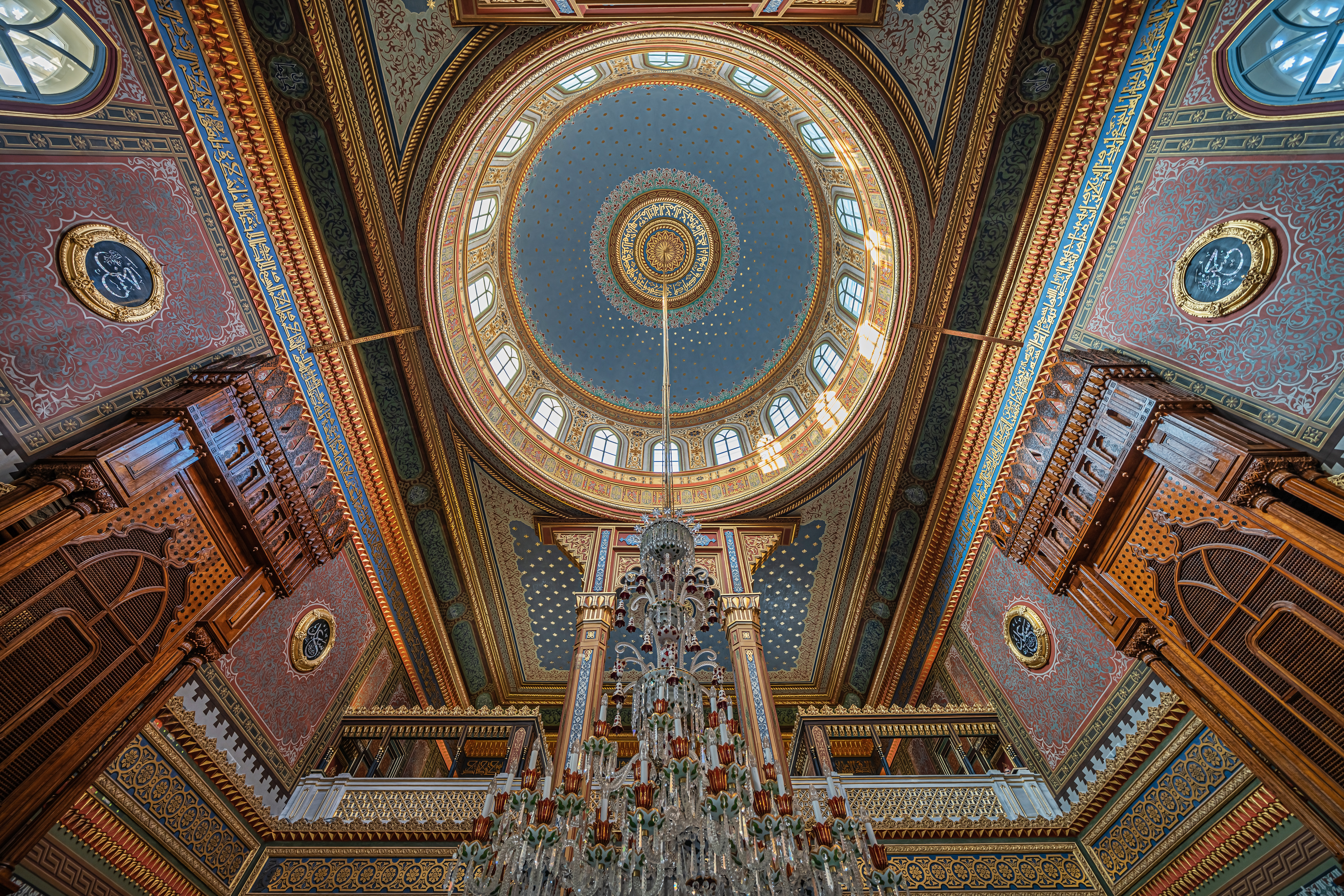
Islam is the predominant religion in Turkey. Interior view of the Yıldız Hamidiye Mosque in Istanbul.

Islam is the religion with the largest community of followers in the country, where most of the population is Muslim, of whom around 90% belong to the Sunni branch of Islam, predominantly following the Hanafi fiqh. About 10% of the Muslim population belongs to the Shia sects. The Alevi faith, thought by most of its adherents to be a form of Shia Islam while a minority considers it to have different origins (such as Ishikism and Yazdanism). It is mostly concentrated in the Central East Anatolia region. Tunceli is the only province of Turkey with an Alevi majority. Ethnic Kurds and Zazas make up a significant share of Alevi population of Turkey, although majority of them are ethnic Turks. The terms Alevi and Bektashi used interchangeably in Turkish religious discourse, the latter also has numerous followers in the Balkan peninsula. Alawite, which is observed by some ethnic Arabs in southern provinces, and Jafari, which is the traditional sect of ethnic Azerbaijanis of the Northeast Anatolia region, are other sects that have significant population in Turkey. It is hard to estimate an exact number for religious minorities since Turkey does not conduct censuses about religious denominations. Although the Shia population of Turkey varies according to different sources from 4% to more than 10%.

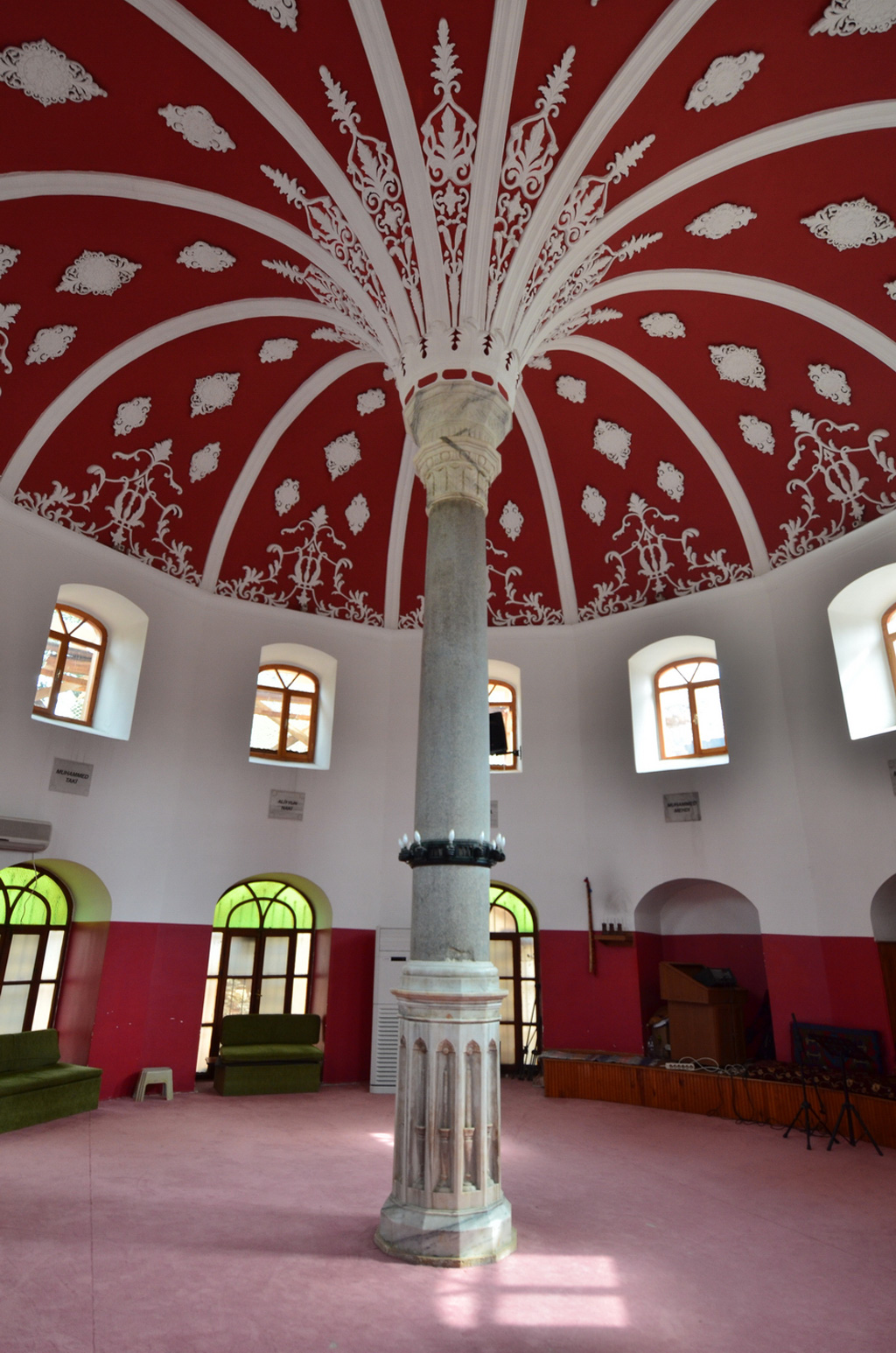
Şahkulu Sultan Dergahı is an Alevi cemevi.

Islam arrived in the region that comprises present-day Turkey, particularly the eastern provinces of the country, as early as the 7th century. The mainstream Hanafi school of Sunni Islam is largely organized by the state through the Presidency of Religious Affairs (known colloquially as Diyanet), which was established in 1924 following the abolition of the Ottoman Caliphate and controls all mosques and Muslim clerics, and is officially the highest religious authority in the country. The Shafi'i school of Sunni Islam is the dominant jurisprudence in Turkish Kurdistan.

As of today, there are thousands of historical mosques throughout the country which are still active. Notable mosques built in the Seljuk and Ottoman periods include the Sultan Ahmed Mosque and Süleymaniye Mosque in Istanbul, the Selimiye Mosque in Edirne, the Yeşil Mosque in Bursa, the Alâeddin Mosque and Mevlana Mosque in Konya, and the Great Mosque in Divriği, among many others. Large mosques built in the Republic of Turkey period include the Kocatepe Mosque in Ankara and the Sabancı Mosque in Adana.

== Minority religions ==
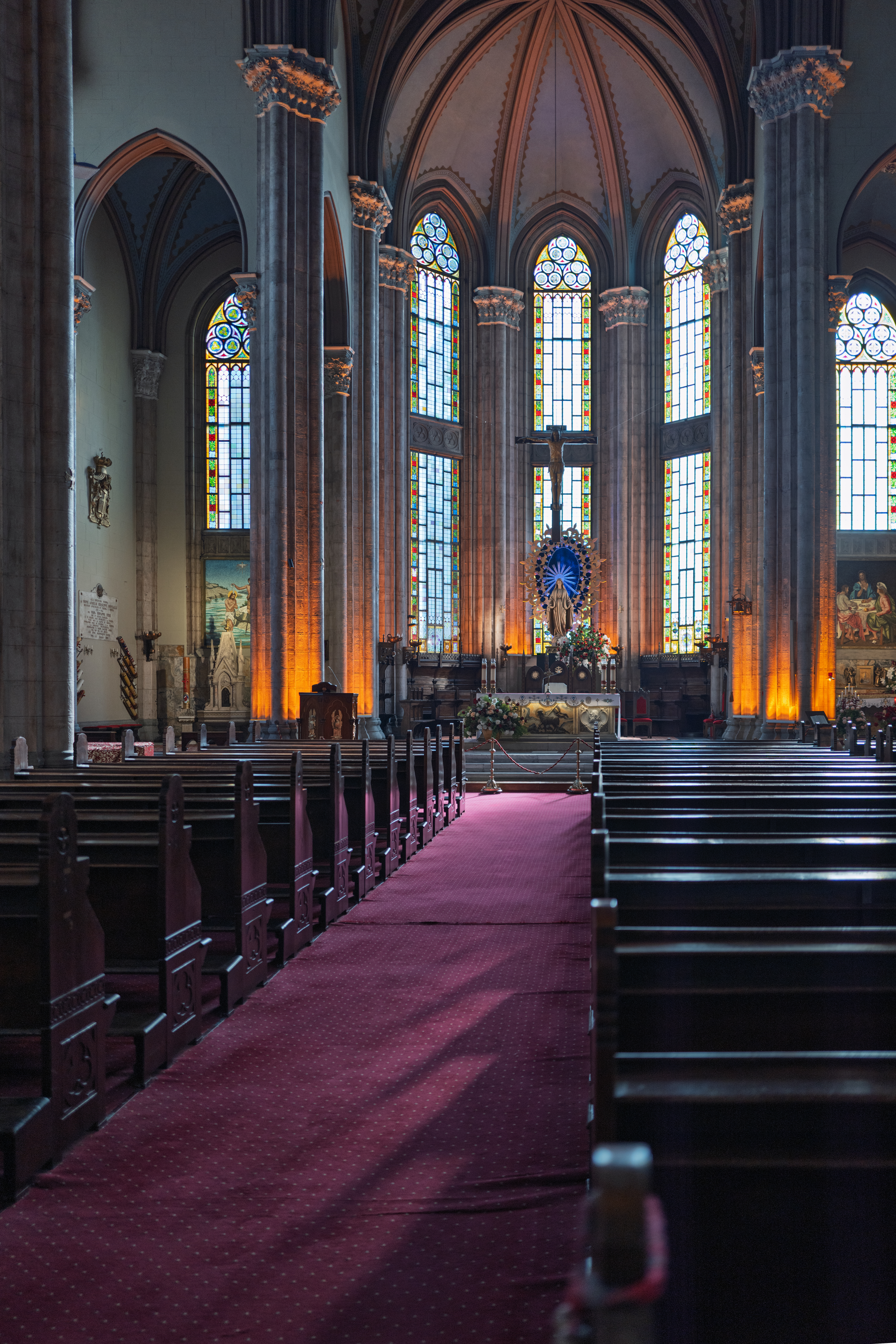
St. Anthony of Padua Church in the Beyoğlu district of Istanbul.

The remainder of the population belongs to other faiths, particularly Christian denominations (Eastern Orthodox, Armenian Apostolic, Syriac Orthodox, Catholic and Protestant), and Judaism (mostly Sephardi Jews, and a smaller Ashkenazi community). There are between 120,000 and 320,000 Christians who belong to various Christian denominations, and fewer than 15,000 Jews in Turkey as of 2024.

Turkey has numerous important sites for Judaism and Christianity, being one of the birthplaces of the latter. Since the 4th century, Istanbul (Constantinople) has been the seat of the Ecumenical Patriarchate of Constantinople (unofficially Fener Rum Ortodoks Patrikhanesi), which is one of the fourteen autocephalous Eastern Orthodox churches, and the primus inter pares (first among equals) in the Eastern Orthodox communion. However, the Turkish government does not recognize the ecumenical status of Patriarch Bartholomew I. The Halki seminary remains closed since 1971 due to the Patriarchate's refusal to accept the supervision of the Turkish Ministry of Education on the school's educational curricula; whereas the Turkish government wants the school to operate as a branch of the Faculty of Theology at Istanbul University. Other Eastern Orthodox denomination is the Turkish Orthodox Patriarchate with strong influences from Turkish nationalist ideology.

Istanbul, since 1461, is the seat of the Armenian Patriarchate of Constantinople. There have been 85 individual patriarchs since establishment of the patriarchate. The first Armenian Patriarch of Constantinople was Hovakim I who ruled from 1461 to 1478. Sultan Mehmed II allowed the establishment of the Patriarchate in 1461, just eight years after the Fall of Constantinople in 1453. The Patriarch was recognized as the religious and secular leader of all Armenians in the Ottoman Empire, and carried the title of milletbaşı or ethnarch as well as patriarch. 75 patriarchs have ruled during the Ottoman period (1461–1908), 4 patriarchs in the Young Turks period (1908–1922) and 6 patriarchs in the current secular Republic of Turkey (1923–present). The current Armenian Patriarch is Sahak II Mashalian (Սահակ Բ. Մաշալեան), who has been in office since 2019.

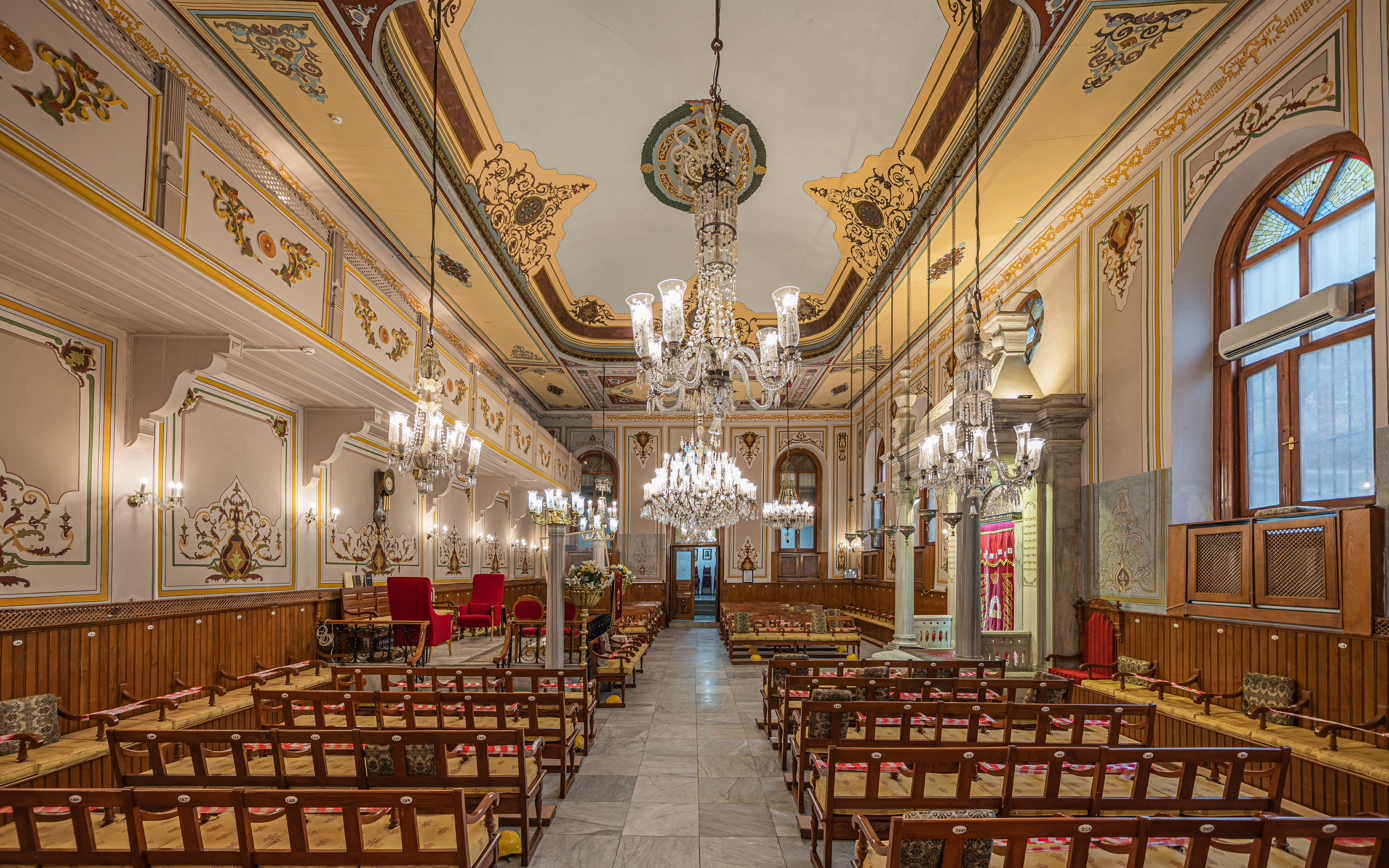
Hemdat Israel Synagogue in Istanbul.

There are many churches and synagogues throughout the country, such as the Church of St. George, the St. Anthony of Padua Church, the Cathedral of the Holy Spirit, the Neve Shalom Synagogue, the Italian Synagogue and the Ashkenazi Synagogue in Istanbul. There are also many historical churches which have been transformed into mosques or museums, such as the Hagia Sophia and Chora Church in Istanbul, the Church of St. Peter in Antakya, and the Church of St. Nicholas in Myra, among many others. 20 existing churches have been repaired by the government since 2002, such as the St. Giragos Armenian Church in Diyarbakır and the Vortvots Vorodman Church in Kumkapı. The Mor Ephrem Syriac Orthodox church, opened on 8 October 2023, is the first church built since the foundation of the Republic of Turkey. There is a small ethnic Turkish Protestant Christian community include about 4,000–5,000 adherents, most of them came from Muslim Turkish background. Around 18,000 Antiochian Greek Christians lives in Turkey, they live mostly in Istanbul, Antioch, Mersin, İskenderun, Samandağ, and in the villages of Altınözü and Tocakli, and the seaside town of Arsuz, As of 2019, an estimated 18,000 of the country's 25,000 Turkish Assyrians live in Istanbul, while the rest live in Tur Abdin. Also, there are around 500 Mormons who live in Turkey.

The percentage of Christians in Turkey fell from 17.5% (three million followers) in a population of 16 million to 2.5% percent in 1927. The drop was the result of events that had a significant impact on the country's demographic structure, such as the Armenian genocide, the population exchange between Greece and Turkey and the emigration of Christians that began in the late 19th century and gained pace in the first quarter of the 20th century. The Wealth Tax on non-Muslims in 1942, the emigration of a portion of Turkish Jews to Israel after 1948, and the ongoing Cyprus dispute, which damaged relations between Turks and Greeks (culminating in the Istanbul pogrom of 6–7 September 1955), were other important events that contributed to the decline of Turkey's non-Muslim population.

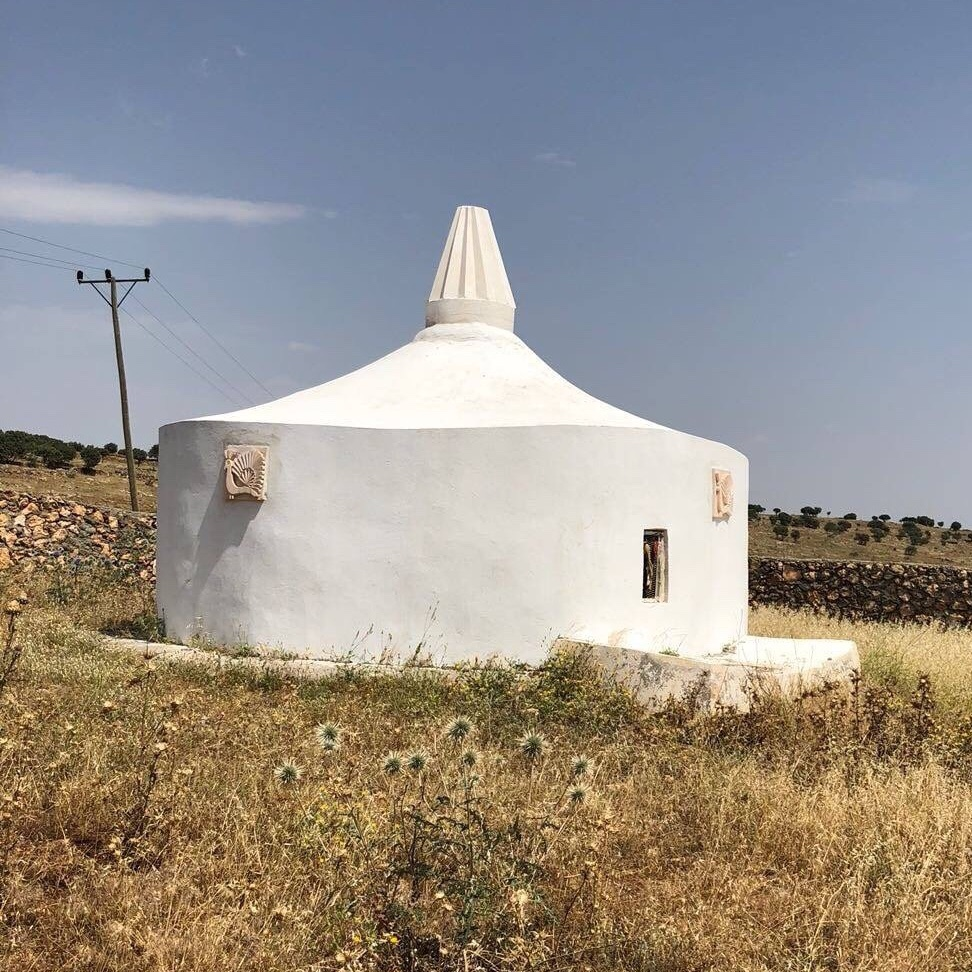
Yazidi temple in Bacin, Midyat District

The Baháʼí Faith in Turkey has roots in Bahá'u'lláh's, the founder of the Baháʼí Faith, being exiled to Constantinople, current-day Istanbul, by the Ottoman authorities. Baháʼís cannot register with the government officially, but there are probably 10 to 20 thousand Baháʼís, and around a hundred Baháʼí Local Spiritual Assemblies in Turkey.

Tengrism is also one of the small religious minorities in Turkey. The interest in Tengrism, which is the old Turkic religion, has been increasing in recent years and the number of people who consider themselves Tengrists has increased.

A sizeable part of the autochthonous Yazidi population of Turkey fled the country for present-day Armenia and Georgia starting from the late 19th century. There are additional communities in Russia and Germany due to recent migration. The Yazidi community of Turkey declined precipitously during the 20th century. Most of them have immigrated to Europe, particularly Germany; those who remain reside primarily in villages in their former heartland of Tur Abdin.

=== Historical Christian sites ===
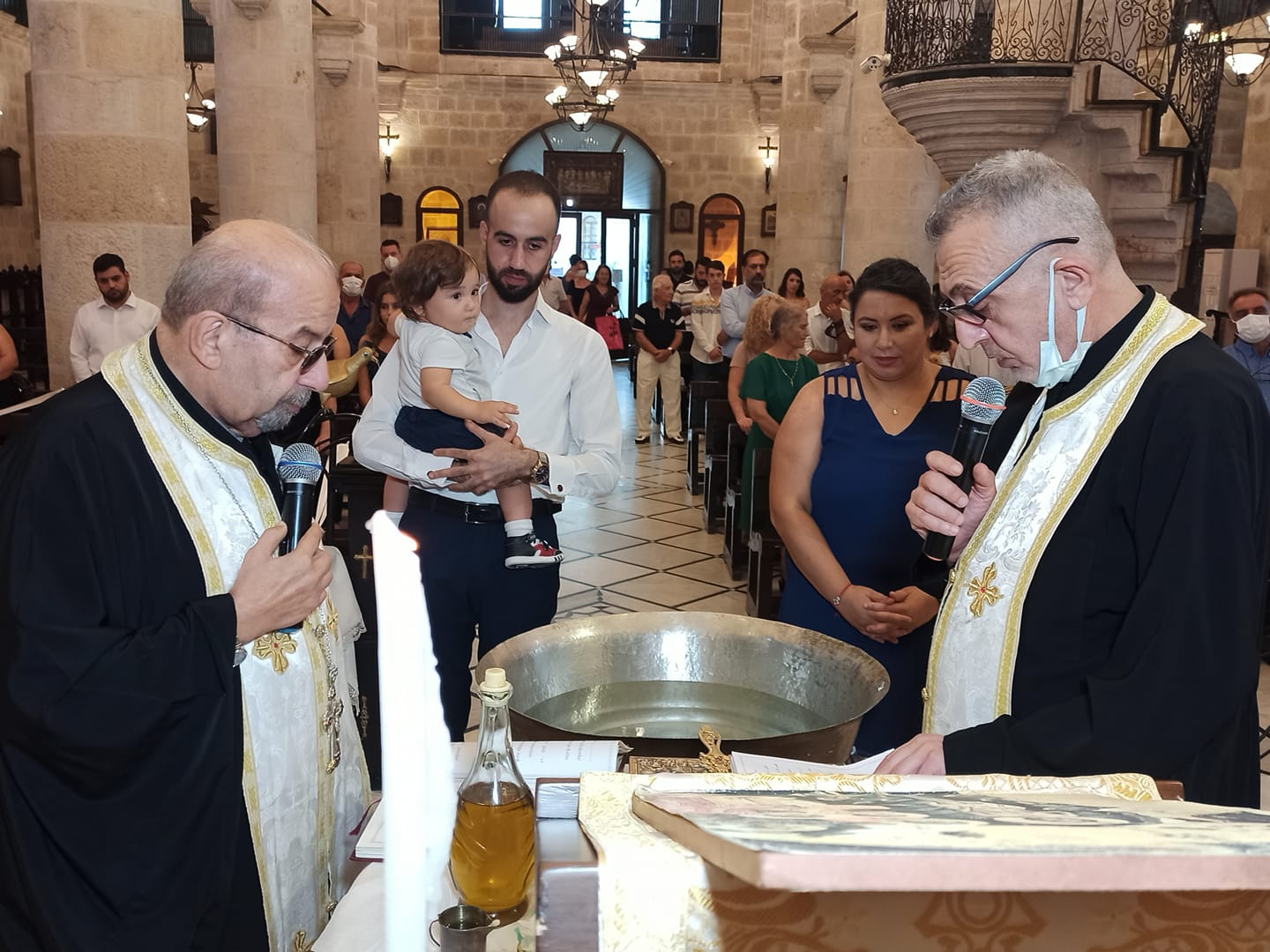
A baptism in St. Paul's Church, Antakya

Antioch (modern Antakya), the city where "the disciples were first called Christians" according to the biblical Book of Acts, is located in modern Turkey, as are most of the areas visited by St. Paul during his missions. The Epistle to the Galatians, Epistle to the Ephesians, Epistle to the Colossians, First Epistle of Peter, and Book of Revelation are addressed to recipients in the territory of modern Turkey.

Additionally, all of the first Seven Ecumenical Councils that define Christianity for Eastern Orthodox and Catholic Christians took place in the territory that is now Turkey. Many titular sees exist in Turkey, as Anatolia was historically home to a large Christian population for centuries.

=== Religious freedom ===
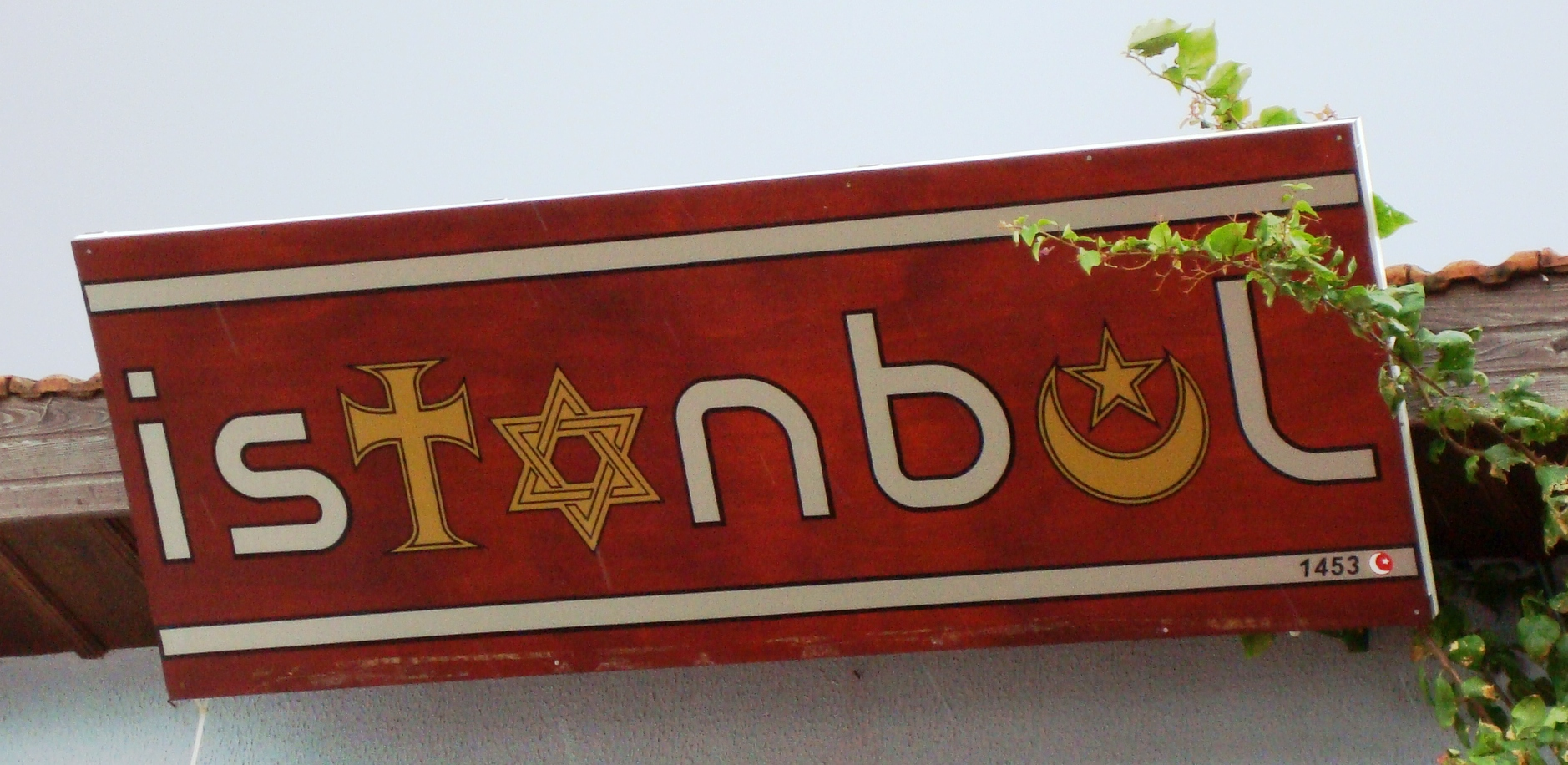
Istanbul text with Abrahamic symbol like the cross, the Star of David and the crescent and star

The Constitution provides for freedom of religion, and Turkey is a party to the European Convention on Human Rights.

Turkey has a democratic government and a strong tradition of secularism. Nevertheless, the Turkish state's interpretation of secularism has reportedly resulted in religious freedom violations for some of its non-Muslim citizens. The 2009 U.S. Commission on International Religious Freedom report placed Turkey on its watchlist with countries such as Afghanistan, Cuba, the Russian Federation, and Venezuela. Nevertheless, according to this report, the situation for Jews in Turkey is better than in other majority Muslim countries. Jews report being able to worship freely and their places of worship having the protection of the government when required. Jews also operate their own schools, hospitals, two elderly homes, welfare institutions, as well as a newspaper. Despite this, concerns have arisen in recent years because of attacks by extremists on synagogues in 2003, as well as growing anti-Semitism in some sectors of the Turkish media and society.

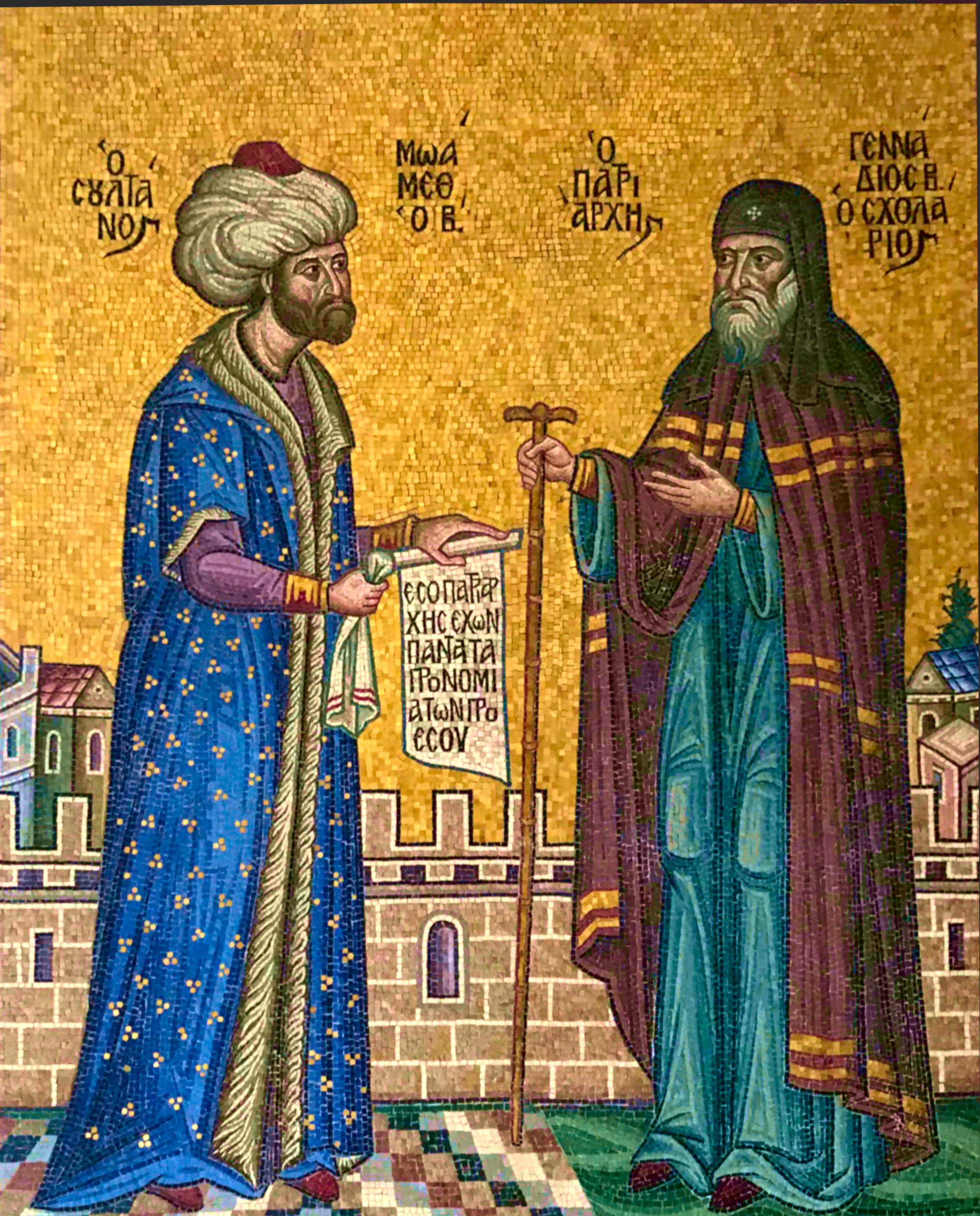
Ottoman Sultan Mehmed the Conqueror and Greek Orthodox Patriarch Gennadios II. Mehmed II not only allowed the Ecumenical Patriarchate of Constantinople to remain active in the city after its conquest by the Ottoman Turks in 1453, he also established the Armenian Patriarchate of Constantinople in 1461, as part of the Millet system. The Byzantines used to regard the Armenian Church as heretical and did not allow it to operate inside the Walls of Constantinople.

Catholic Christians have also occasionally been subjected to violent societal attacks. In February 2006, an Italian Catholic priest was shot to death in his church in Trabzon, reportedly by a youth angered over the caricatures of Muhammad in Danish newspapers. The government strongly condemned the killing. A 16-year-old boy was subsequently charged with the murder and sentenced to 19 years in prison. In December 2007, a 19-year-old stabbed a Catholic priest outside a church in İzmir; the priest was treated and released the following day. According to newspaper reports, the assailant, who was arrested soon afterward, admitted that he had been influenced by a recent television program that depicted Christian missionaries as "infiltrators" who took advantage of poor people.

The Armenian Patriarch, head of the Armenian Orthodox Church, also lacks the status of legal personality (unlike the Ecumenical Patriarch of Constantinople, who has a government-recognized role), and there is no seminary in Turkey to educate its clerics since the closure of the last remaining seminar by the state, as only 65,000 Armenian Orthodox people live in Turkey. In 2006, the Armenian Patriarch submitted a proposal to the Minister of Education to enable his community to establish a faculty in the Armenian language at a state university with instruction by the Patriarch. Under current restrictions, only the Sunni Muslim community can legally operate institutions to train new clergy in Turkey for future leadership.

Patriarch Bartholomew I, most senior bishop among equals in the traditional hierarchy of Orthodox Christianity, said that he felt "crucified" living in Turkey under a government that did not recognize the ecumenical status of Patriarch and which would like to see his Patriarchate die out. The AKP government under Prime Minister Recep Tayyip Erdoğan criticized Bartholomew I, with deputy prime minister Arınç saying that the Eastern Orthodox Church enjoyed their religious rights during the AKP's rule, and foreign minister Davutoğlu saying that he hoped that the Patriarch's remarks had been a "slip of the tongue". In response to the government's criticism, Bartholomew's lawyer said when the patriarchate was criticizing government, he was referring to the state, not the AKP government in particular. Prime Minister Erdoğan said that "When it comes to the question, 'Are you recognizing [him] as ecumenical?', I wouldn't be annoyed by it [this title]. Since it did not annoy my ancestors, it will not annoy me, either. But it may annoy some [people] in my country." The Greek Orthodox orphanage in Büyükada was closed by the government; however, following a ruling by the European Court of Human Rights, the deed to the orphanage was returned to the Ecumenical Patriarchate on 29 November 2010.

In 2022, Freedom House rated Turkey’s religious freedom as 2 out of 4, noting that apart from Sunni Islam, Judaism, Orthodox Christianity and Armenian Christianity are officially recognized, but there are regular disputes regarding property and training of clerics.

== Irreligion ==
Irreligion in Turkey is uncommon among Turks, as Islam is the predominant faith. However, in recent years some secular officials have claimed that atheism and deism are growing among Turkish people.

According to a Ipsos survey conducted in 2017, which interviewed 17,180 adults across 22 countries polls showed that 82% of Turkey was Muslim and 7% of those who were interviewed from Turkey followed no religion whereas 6% identified as "Spiritual but not religious".

According to a poll made by MAK in 2017, 86% of the Turkish population declared they believe in God. 76% declared they believe Quran and other holy books came through revelation by God. According to another poll made in 2019 by OPTİMAR, which interviewed 3,500 people across 26 cities that 89.5% of those who were interviewed declared they believe in God while 4.5% said they believe in a God but do not believe in a religion. Since there is stigma attached to being an atheist in Turkey, many Turkish atheists communicate with each other via the Internet.

Another poll conducted by Gezici Araştırma in 2020 found that across 12 provinces and 18 districts in Turkey with the sample size of 1,062 people stated that 28.5% of Gen Z in Turkey identified with no religion.

According to a 2023 survey, irreligiosity in the general population stood at 5.7% (including 1.5% for atheism) while it was 6% for those aged 25–34 and 11% for those aged 18–24. Looking more specifically at the "typologies of belief and religiosity", the same report shows that among the 18–24, 18.4% are "devout Muslims", 39.9% are "mainstream Muslims", 29.1% are "secular Muslims" while 12.6% are "secular non-believer."

== Secularism ==
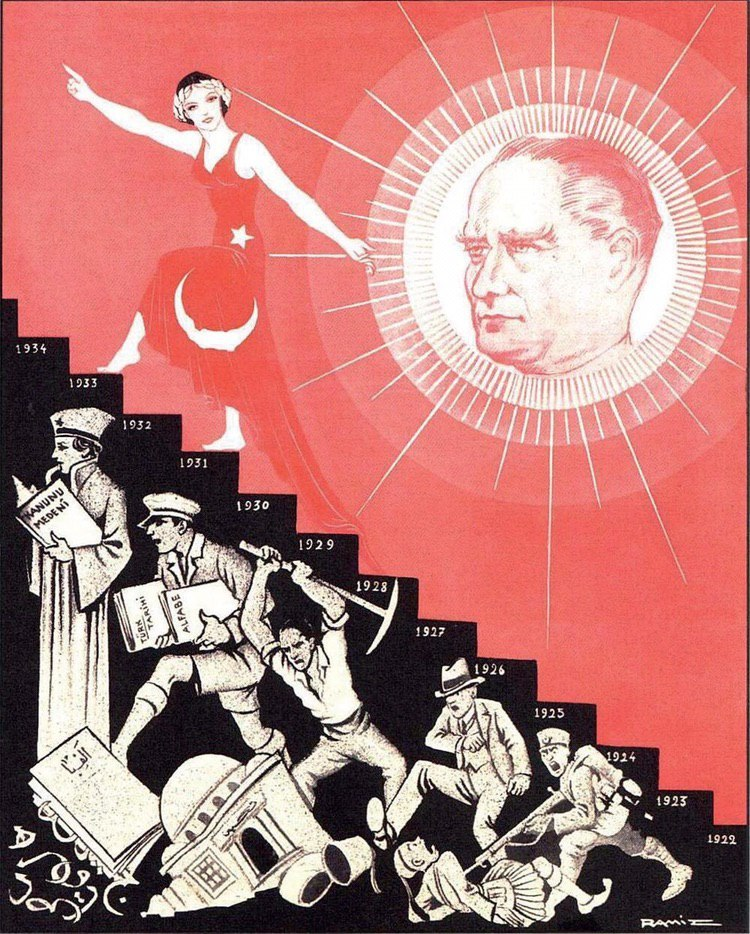
An illustration depicting Atatürk's reforms. From right to left: The victory over the Greek invasion, the abandonment of the fez, the closure of the sectarian lodges, the adoption of the new Turkish alphabet, the adoption of the Turkish civil code.

Turkey has a secular constitution, with no official state religion. Over the course of the 20th century, it developed a strong tradition of secularism similar to the French model of laïcité, with the main distinction being that the Turkish state "openly and publicly controls Islam through its State Directorate of Religious Affairs". The constitution recognizes the freedom of religion for individuals, whereas the religious communities are placed under the protection and jurisdiction of the state and cannot become involved in the political process (e.g. by forming a religious party) or establish faith-based schools. No political party can claim that it represents a form of religious belief; nevertheless, religious sensibilities are generally represented through conservative parties. For decades, the wearing of religious headcover and similar theopolitical symbolic garments was prohibited in universities and other public contexts such as military or police service. As a specific incarnation of an otherwise abstract principle, it accrued symbolic importance among both proponents and opponents of secularism and became the subject of various legal challenges before being dismantled in a series of legislative acts from 2010 to 2017.

Secularism was established in Turkey soon after its founding in 1923, with an amendment to the Turkish constitution that mandated that Turkey had no official state religion and that the government and the state were to be free of religious influence. The modernizing reforms undertaken by President Mustafa Kemal Atatürk in the 1920s and 1930s further established secularism in Turkey.

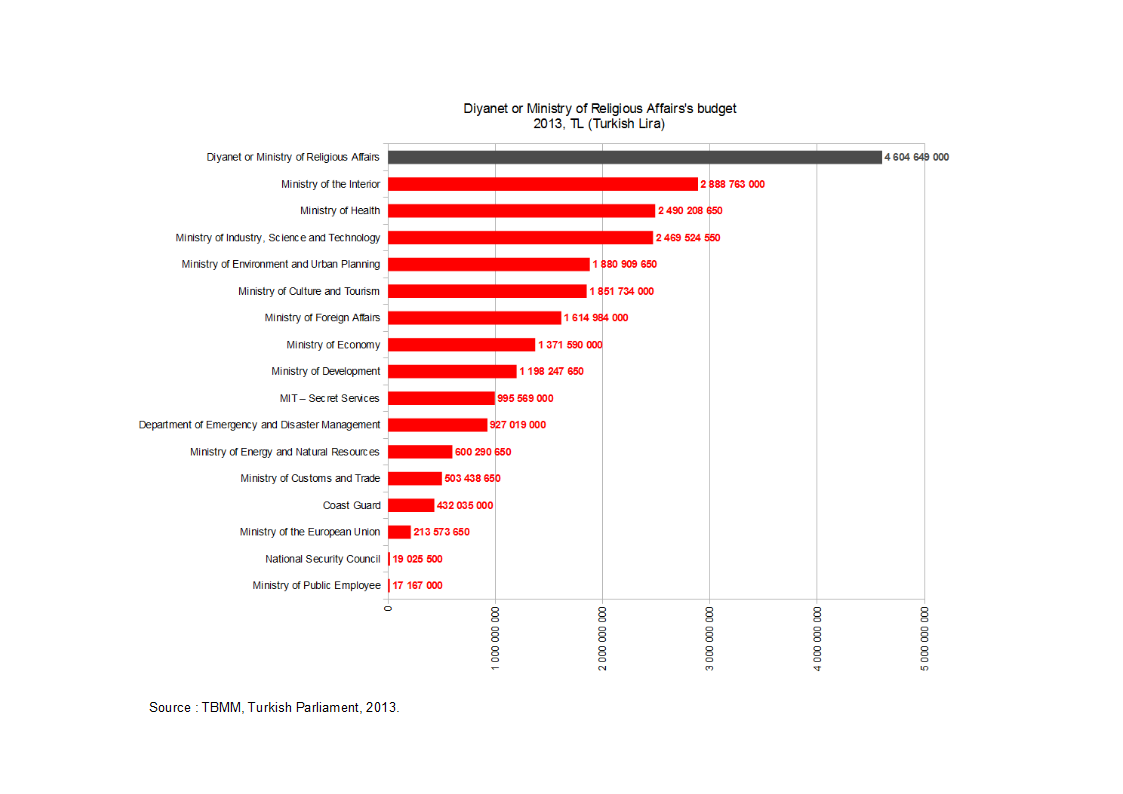
Diyanet's Budget in 2013 - Source : TBMM, Turkish Parliament, 2013.

Despite its official secularism, the Turkish government includes the state agency of the Presidency of Religious Affairs (Turkish: Diyanet İşleri Başkanlığı), whose purpose is stated by law "to execute the works concerning the beliefs, worship, and ethics of Islam, enlighten the public about their religion, and administer the sacred worshiping places". The institution, commonly known simply as Diyanet, operates 77,500 mosques, builds new ones, pays the salaries of imams, and approves all sermons given in mosques in Turkey. The Presidency of Religious Affairs finances only Sunni Muslim worship in Turkey. For example, Alevi, Jafari (mostly Azeris), and Bektashi Muslims (mostly Turkmen) participate in the financing of the mosques and the salaries of Sunni imams by paying taxes to the state, while their places of worship, which are not officially recognized, do not receive any state funding. The Presidency of Religious Affairs' budget rose from US$0.9 billion for the year 2006 to $2.5 billion in 2012.

Beginning in the 1980s, the role of religion in the state has been a divisive issue, as influential religious factions challenged the complete secularization called for by Kemalism and the observance of Islamic practices experienced a substantial revival. In the early 2000s (decade), Islamic groups challenged the concept of a secular state with increasing vigor after Recep Tayyip Erdoğan's Islamist-rooted Justice and Development Party (AKP) came into power in 2002.

Turkey, through the Treaty of Lausanne (1923), recognizes the civil, political, and cultural rights of non-Muslim minorities. In practice, Turkey only recognizes Greek, Armenian, and Jewish religious minorities. Alevi are partially recognized while Jafari (Twelever Shia) Muslims among other Muslim sects, as well as Latin Catholics and Protestants, are not recognized officially. In 2013, the European Court of Human Rights ruled that Turkey had discriminated against the religious freedom of Alevis.

With more than 100,000 employees, the Presidency of Religious Affairs has been described as state within the state.

== Islamization under AKP ==
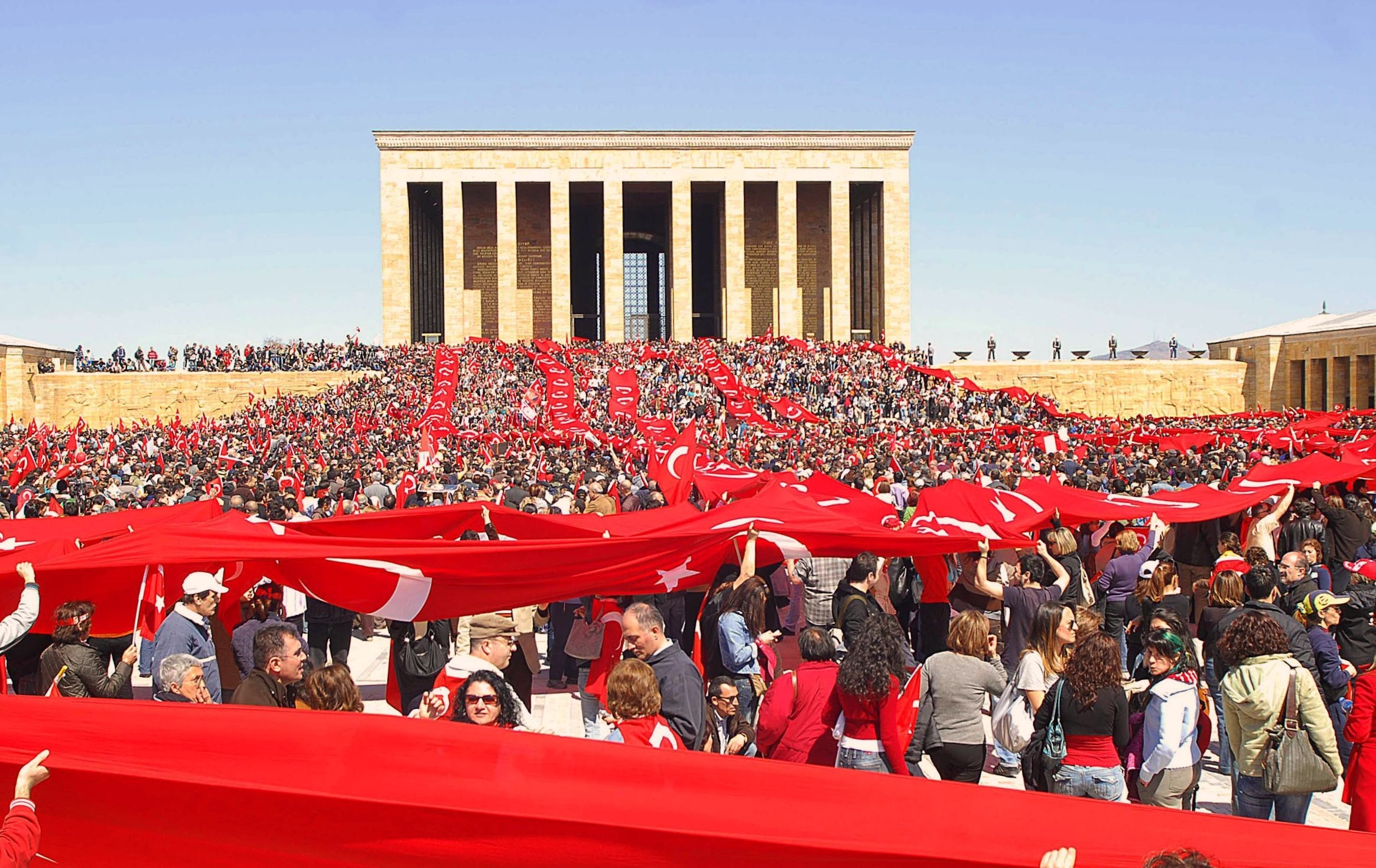
The Republic Protests took place in 2007 in support of the Kemalist ethos, avowing state secularism, against the perceived Islamization of Turkey under the ruling Justice and Development Party.

The rise of Islamic religiosity in Turkey in the last two decades, under the government of Recep Tayyip Erdoğan and the Justice and Development Party (AKP), has been discussed for the past several years. Many see Turkish society moving towards a more hardline Islamic identity and country, citing increasing religious criticisms against what is considered immoral behaviour and government policies seen as enforcing conservative Islamic morality, including mandates of wearing modest clothing and banning of lipstick and nail polish for airline hostesses, as well as the controversial blasphemy conviction of the pianist Fazıl Say for "insulting Islam" by retweeting a joke about the Islamic Friday prayer. The New York Times published a report about Turkey in 2012, noting an increased polarization between secular and religious groups in Turkish society and politics. Critics argue that Turkish public institutions, once staunchly secular, are shifting in favour of Islamists.

Turkish academic Ayhan Kaya, in his 2015 research article Islamisation of Turkey under the AKP Rule: Empowering Family, Faith and Charity, summarizes the question by talking of "a subtle Islamisation of society and politics in everyday life through the debates on the headscarf issue, Imam Hatip (religious) schools, faith communities and Alevism, the rise of an Islamic bourgeoisie with its roots in Anatolian culture, the emergence of consumerist lifestyles, not only among the secular segments of the Turkish society but also among Islamists, and, finally, the weakening of the legitimacy of the Turkish military as ‘the guardian of national unity and the laicist order’."

In a 2022 book chapter, Turkish political scientist S. Erdem Aytaç, while analyzing different nationally representative polls and surveys from 2002, when the AKP rule began, till 2018, when the latest data was available, noted "an increase in subjective religiosity during the AKP rule", as the share of "non-devout" respondents fell from 44% in 2002 to 28% in 2018 while the "devout" rose from 32% to 42% and the "very devout" from 24% to 30% during these years.

However, some claim that Erdoğan's "raise a pious generation" in Turkey, in turn created a backlash and even lowering the religiosity among the youth. For example, the use of veil is 40 to 50% of women in general, while only 35% of the young women are veiling.

=== Education ===
The government of Erdoğan and the AKP pursue the explicit policy agenda of Islamization of education to "raise a devout generation" against secular resistance, in the process causing lost jobs and school for many non-religious citizens of Turkey.

In 2013, several books that were previously recommended for classroom use were found to be rewritten to include more Islamic themes, without the Ministry of Education's consent. Traditional stories of Pinocchio, Heidi, and Tom Sawyer were rewritten to include characters that wished each other a "God-blessed morning" and statements that included "in Allah's Name"; in one rewrite, one of the Three Musketeers converted to Islam.

=== Headscarf controversy ===
For most of the 20th century, Turkish law prohibited the wearing of headscarves and similar garments of religious symbolism in public governmental institutions. The law became a wedge issue in the public discourse, culminating in an early effort to see the law overturned by the Grand Chamber of the European Court of Human Rights failing in 2005 when the court deemed it legitimate in Leyla Şahin v. Turkey.

Subsequently, the issue formed a core of Recep Tayyip Erdogan's first campaign for the presidency in 2007, arguing that it was an issue of human rights and freedoms Following his victory, the ban was eliminated in a series of legislative acts starting with an amendment to the constitution in 2008 allowing women to wear headscarves in Turkish universities while upholding the prohibition of symbols of other religions in that context. Further changes saw the ban eliminated in some government buildings including parliament the next year, followed by the police forces and, finally, the military in 2017.

=== Restriction of alcohol sales and advertising ===
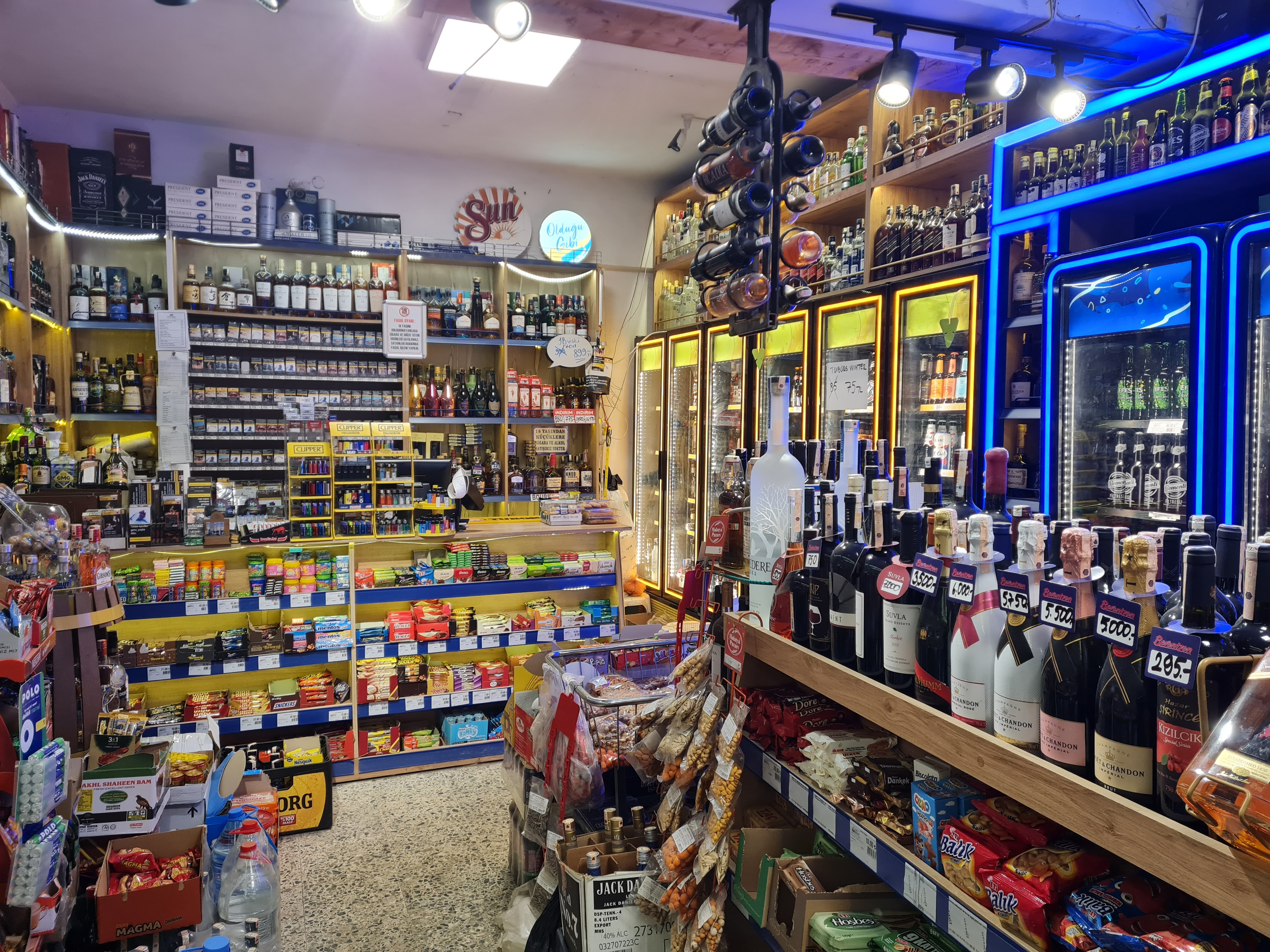
Even though alcohol sale hour restrictions are imposed on all stores except restaurants, the smaller grocery stores or Tekels are not following it thoroughly.

In 2013, the parliament of Turkey passed legislation that bans all forms of advertising for alcoholic beverages and restricting the alcohol sales after 11PM, except restaurants. This also includes the censoring of images on television, usually implemented by blurring, historically implemented by CNBC-e as flower placement. The law was sponsored by the ruling AKP.

=== Mosque conversions ===
==== Hagia Sophia ====
In early July 2020, the Council of State annulled the Cabinet's 1934 decision to establish the museum, revoking the monument's status, and a subsequent decree by Turkish president Recep Tayyip Erdoğan ordered the reclassification of Hagia Sophia as a mosque. The 1934 decree was ruled to be unlawful under both Ottoman and Turkish law as Hagia Sophia's waqf, endowed by Sultan Mehmed, had designated the site a mosque; proponents of the decision argued the Hagia Sophia was the personal property of the sultan. This redesignation is controversial, invoking condemnation from the Turkish opposition, UNESCO, the World Council of Churches, the International Association of Byzantine Studies, and many international leaders.

During his speech announcing the conversion of the monument, Erdoğan highlighted how the conversion would gratify the "spirit of conquest" of Mehmet II, and during the first sermon on 24 July 2020, Ali Erbaş, head of Turkey's Directorate of Religious Affairs, held a sword in his hand, symbolizing a tradition of conquest. This was perceived as a branding of the non-Muslim population of Turkey, especially the Greek Orthodox as "re-conquered subjects and second-class citizens".

==== Church of St. Saviour in Chora ====
In August 2020, just a month after the Hagia Sophia, the president of Turkey Recep Tayyip Erdoğan ordered the ancient Orthodox Church, the 1,000-year-old Church of St. Saviour in Chora to be converted into a mosque. Similar to the Hagia Sophia, it had earlier been converted from a church into a mosque in 1453, and then into a museum known as the Kariye Museum after the Second World War.

=== Counterclaims ===
Many also see interest and support of secularism in Turkey as increasing, not decreasing. After Erdogan made a statement in January 2012 about his desire to "raise a religious youth," politicians of all parties condemned his statements as abandoning Turkish values. A petition reading "[O]f Muslim, Christian, Jewish, Zoroastrian, Alawite, Shafi’i, religious and non-religious, atheist and agnostic backgrounds, all joined with a firm belief in secularism, [we] find your recent remarks about raising a religious and conservative youth most alarming and dangerous" was signed by over 2,000 people. The pro-government newspaper Bugün ran a story stating "no one has the right to convert this society into a religious one, or the opposite." Surveys of the Turkish people also show a great support for maintaining secular lifestyles. The Turkish Economic and Social Studies Foundation found that only 9% of Turks supported a religious state in 2006. A more recent 2015 poll by Metropoll found that over 80% of Turkish people supported the continuation of Turkey as a secular state, with even the majority of AKP voters supporting a secular state too. Furthermore, according to a 2016 Pew Research Center Report, only 13% of all Turks believe laws should "strictly follow the teachings of the Qur'an."

An early April 2018 report of the Turkish Ministry of Education, titled "The Youth is Sliding to Deism", observed that an increasing number of pupils in İmam Hatip schools was abandoning Islam in favour of deism. The report's publication generated large-scale controversy amongst conservative Muslim groups in Turkish society. Progressive Islamic theologian Mustafa Öztürk noted the deist trend a year earlier, arguing that the "very archaic, dogmatic notion of religion" held by the majority of those claiming to represent Islam was causing "the new generations [to get] indifferent, even distant, to the Islamic worldview." Despite lacking reliable statistical data, numerous anecdotes appear to point in this direction. Although some commentators claim the secularisation is merely a result of Western influence or even a "conspiracy", most commentators, even some pro-government ones, have come to conclude that "the real reason for the loss of faith in Islam is not the West but Turkey itself: It is a reaction to all the corruption, arrogance, narrow-mindedness, bigotry, cruelty and crudeness displayed in the name of Islam." Especially when the AKP Islamists are in power to enforce Islam upon society, this is making citizens turn their back on it. However, in a 2023 study, it was reported that "a significant portion of society, particularly younger individuals, believes in God but distances themselves from religious institutions and practices", conclude that despite deism having some attraction among university students in particular (highest of 15% among BA students), estimating the prevalence of deism in overall Turkish society to be less than 2%.

Yılmaz Esmer, a Turkish professor, did a survey on radicalism and fundamentalism in the country in 2009, on subjects such as Darwinian evolution (7% believed in it back then), but he noted that the results were not different from a similar survey done in 1990, thus noting that there has been no real "recent Islamic resurgence encouraged by the rule of the AKP", just that religiosity was always there but now "has become more visible."

== See also ==
- Armenian Patriarchate of Constantinople
- Greek (Ecumenical) Patriarchate of Constantinople
- List of mosques in Turkey
- List of churches in Turkey
- List of synagogues in Turkey
- Mersin Interfaith Cemetery
