= Ali Erbaş =

President of Directorate of Religious Affairs in Turkey

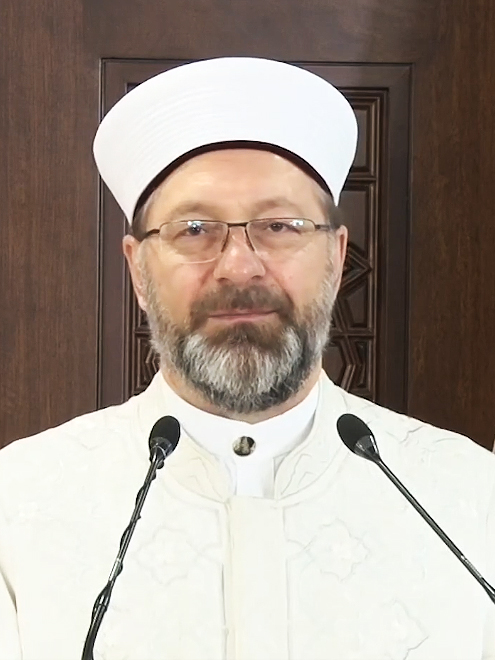

President of the Directorate of Religious Affairs
- In office 17 September 2017 – 17 September 2025
- President: Recep Tayyip Erdoğan
- Preceded by: Mehmet Görmez
- Succeeded by: Safi Arpaguş

Personal details
- Born: 10 September 1961 (age 65) Kabadüz, Ordu, Turkey
- Spouse: Seher Erbaş
- Children: 4
- Education: Marmara University

Ali Erbaş (born 10 September 1961) is a Turkish Islamic scholar and president of Directorate of Religious Affairs (Diyanet) in Turkey from 2017 to 2025.

== Education ==
Erbaş attended elementary school in Yeşilyurt, and graduated from the Imam Hatip School in Sakarya in 1984.

Erbaş received a master's degree at the Marmara University in 1987, and achieved a PhD in the Department of History of Religions in 1993 at the same university.

== Professional career ==
In 1993, he was nominated lecturer at the Theological Faculty of the Sakarya University.

Then he carried out studies in his field as a guest member of the teaching staff of the Faculty of Human Sciences at the University of Strasbourg for a full year as of the beginning of the academic year 1996–1997.

He returned to Turkey at the beginning of 1997–1998 academic year and became an associate professor in November 1998 and professor in January 2004.

In 2016 he was nominated as the rector of the Yalova University.

Ali Erbaş was appointed President of the Directorate of Religious Affairs in September 2017.

=== Controversy ===
Ali Erbaş, in his capacity as the head of the directorate of religious affairs, has stated during a sermon in the Hagia Sophia on the 24 April 2020 that homosexuality leads to illnesses, which drew criticism from the Bar Associations of Ankara and Diyarbakır. Both Bar associations resulted being investigated for insulting religious values over their critical remarks on Ali Erbaş. During the dispute, Erbas was supported by the Recep Tayyip Erdogan who mentioned that an assault on the Diyanet's head would not be tolerated. Erbaş also claimed that HIV and all the evil and pandemics in the world are caused by homosexuality. A student in Istanbul Technical University faced disciplinary action after distributing a leaflet that called Erbaş "reactionary".

== Personal life ==
Ali Erbaş is married and has four children.
