= Seyhan Soylu =

Turkish media figure

Seyhan Soylu is a well-known figure in Turkey, a high profile trans woman and media figure who has ventured into politics several times.

== Life ==
Seyhan Soylu was born in Istanbul in 1966. as Hakan Kapgit.

In 2007, she put herself forward to stand as a candidate for the DSP in the TBMM. In 2008 she was arrested as part of ongoing investigations into the Ergenekon scandal. In 2018 she put herself forward to stand as a candidate for the Felicity Party.

Until 2012 she was director of the Turkish television channel 24 TV, where she was involved in the controversial program Penitents Compete.

She is the owner of Business Channel Turkiye.
