= Safi Arpaguş =

Turkish academic and statesperson (born 1967)

19th President of the Presidency of Religious Affairs
- Incumbent
- Assumed office 18 September 2025
- President: Recep Tayyip Erdoğan
- Preceded by: Ali Erbaş

Mufti of Istanbul
- In office 15 October 2021 – 18 September 2025
- Preceded by: Mehmet Emin Maşalı
- Succeeded by: Emrullah Tuncel

Personal details
- Born: 1967 (age 58–59) Gümüşhacıköy, Amasya, Turkey
- Spouse: Hatice Kelpetin Arpaguş
- Education: Marmara University (Faculty of Theology)
- Occupation: Academic, theologian

Safi Arpaguş (born 1967, Gümüşhacıköy) is a Turkish academic and theologian, serving as the president of the Presidency of Religious Affairs (Diyanet) since 18 September 2025. Prior to this position, he served as the Mufti of Istanbul between 2021 and 2025. In his academic career, he specialises in the study of Rumi and Sufism.

== Early life and education ==
Arpaguş was born in 1967 in the Gümüşhacıköy district of Amasya. He graduated from the Gümüşhacıköy Imam-Hatip High School in 1985. In 1990, he graduated with a bachelor's degree from the Marmara University Faculty of Theology. In 1994, he completed his master's degree with the thesis titled "Analysis of Aziz Mahmud Hüdâyî's Work Nasâyıh and Mevâiz in Terms of Oratory and Guidance" (Turkish: Aziz Mahmud Hüdâyî’nin Nasâyıh ve Mevâiz adlı eserinin Hitâbet ve İrşâd açısından Tahlili). He later completed his PhD with his study titled "Rumi's Method of Religious Expression" (Turkish: Mevlânâ’nın Dîni Anlatım Metodu).

== Career ==
He started his academic career in 1992 as a research assistant in the field of Sufism (tasavvuf) at Marmara University. He conducted research related to his field in the United Kingdom between 2002 and 2003, and in Syria in 2010. He received the title of associate professor in 2008 and became a professor on 28 January 2014. Following Istanbul being chosen as the European Capital of Culture in 2010, he took part in the "Enderun Teravihi" project.

Between 2011 and 2021, he served as the Deputy Dean of the Marmara University Faculty of Theology. On 15 October 2021, he was appointed as the Mufti of Istanbul by a presidential decree. At the same time, he served as a faculty member and the head of the Sufism Department at the Marmara University Faculty of Theology. On 17 September 2025, with the appointment decision published in the Official Gazette, he was appointed to the Presidency of Religious Affairs, replacing Ali Erbaş.

While serving as the Mufti of Istanbul, Safi Arpaguş organized a mawlid program at the Bezmiâlem Valide Sultan Mosque on Friday, 10 November 2023, on the occasion of the 85th anniversary of Atatürk's death.

== Personal life ==
He is married to Hatice Kelpetin Arpaguş, who teaches as a professor in the Kalam Department of the Marmara University Faculty of Theology. He stated in his resume that he speaks English, Arabic, and Persian.

== Works ==
- Mevlânâ ve İslâm (Mevlana and Islam)
- Mevlevîlik’te Manevî Eğitim (Spiritual Education in Mevlevism)
- Hüseyin Azmi Dede; Risaleler (Hüseyin Azmi Dede; Treatises)
- Aziz Mahmud Hüdâyi, Sohbetler (Aziz Mahmud Hüdâyi, Conversations)
- Ahmed Avni Konuk, Mesnevî-i Şerif Şerhi, -Heyet-, I-XIII (Ahmed Avni Konuk, Commentary on the Masnavi, -Committee-, I-XIII)
- İsmail Rüsûhî Ankaravî, Minhâcü’l-Fukarâ (İsmail Rüsûhî Ankaravî, Minhaj al-Fukara)
- Tâhirü’l-Mevlevî, Yenikapı Mevlevihanesi Postnişini Şeyh Celaleddin Efendi (Tâhirü’l-Mevlevî, Sheikh Celaleddin Efendi, the Postnişin of the Yenikapı Mevlevi Lodge)
