= Mehmet Görmez =

Turkish civil servant

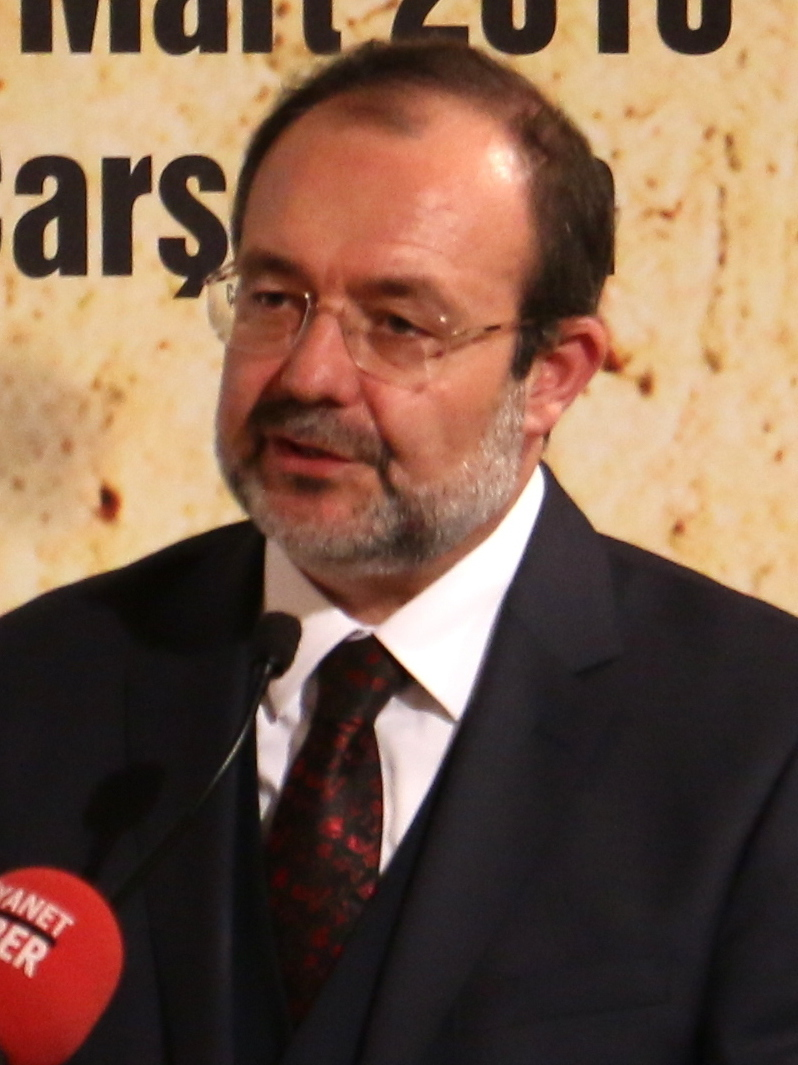

President of the Directorate of Religious Affairs
- In office 11 November 2010 – 31 July 2017
- President: Abdullah Gül; Recep Tayyip Erdoğan
- Preceded by: Ali Bardakoğlu
- Succeeded by: Ali Erbaş

Personal details
- Born: 1959 (age 66–67) Nizip, Gaziantep, Turkey
- Education: Ankara University, Islamic Studies
- Known for: President of Diyanet İşleri Başkanlığı

Mehmet Görmez (born 1959) is the former President of the Presidency of Religious Affairs (Turkish: Diyanet İşleri Başkanlığı from November 2010 to 31 July 2017, commonly known as Diyanet) and as such legally the highest level Islamic scholar in Turkey and the Turkish Republic of Northern Cyprus.

== Background ==
Mehmet Görmez was born in 1959 in Nizip in Gaziantep Province, Turkey. His maternal grandmother was Turkish, while his paternal grandmother was Kurdish. His paternal side is partially from Sivas.

He has been the President of Diyanet since November 2010. In 1987, he completed his studies of Islamic studies at Ankara University and gained his bachelor's degree at this faculty. Later, he became an assistant at Ahmet Yesevi University in Kazakhstan. From 1988 to 1989, he visited Cairo University. In 1995, he earned his PhD in Islamic studies at the Ankara University. From 1997 to 1998, he lived in the United Kingdom. From 2001 to 2003 he gave lessons at the Hacettepe University. He became a professor in 2006.

The Islamic State in Iraq and the Levant (ISIL) declared him an apostate.

He speaks fluent Turkish, Arabic, English, and partially speaks a regional dialect of Kurdish that is heavily Turkish-influenced according to his own account.

Government offices
Preceded by Ali Bardakoğlu	President of Religious Affairs of Turkey; 2010–2017	Succeeded by Ali Erbaş
