= Yalova University =

Public university in Yalova, Turkey

Coordinates: 40.65295°N 29.22053°E

- Yalova Üniversitesi
- Type: Public
- Established: 2008
- Rector: Prof. Dr. Mehmet Bahçekapılı
- Location: Yalova, Turkey
- Language: Turkish, English, Arabic
- Colours: Turquoise Maroon
- Website: www.yalova.edu.tr

Yalova University (Turkish: Yalova Üniversitesi) is a university in Turkey's Yalova Province.

Yalova University has been founded under the Law no 5765 on May 22, 2008, and Prof. Dr. M. Niyazi Eruslu has been appointed as the first rector.

The Faculty of Economics and Administrative Sciences and Vocational School of Higher Education of Yalova that had already been established and functioning as a constituent of Uludag University became a part of the recently founded university following the enactment of the law.

The Faculty of Economics and Administrative Sciences of the university provides education at the undergraduate and provides postgraduate levels for students from foreign countries and from Turkey. The faculty offers academic programs that strive to teach administrative, entrepreneurial, and economical skills. It encourages providing, compiling, and publishing new sources of information in the field of economics and administrative sciences. Also the faculty contributes the business world through programs that aim at mastering efficiency and productivity. Newer departments include business administration (English), international relations (English), social service and labor economics - industrial relations have already been established.

The Faculty of Law has also been founded and attempts to open new departments have been initiated.

The faculty of engineering aims not only to impart contemporary engineering and scientific knowledge in the disciplines concerned, but also to inculcate creativity, research techniques, and self development.

The undergraduate curriculum provides a firm background in the basic sciences through courses in computer science, chemistry, energy systems and polymer fields.

In addition to faculties, Yalova University has a vocational school of higher education.

The school of foreign languages aims to improve the students' language skills before they start their English-medium instruction. The school of foreign languages has a modular system in accordance with Common European Framework of Reference.

Despite being a new built university, national and international conferences, symposiums were Ottoman Empire's Establishment Date Symposium organized by Yalova - Bilkent Universities and International VII.
