= Ali Bardakoğlu =

Turkish academic (born 1952)

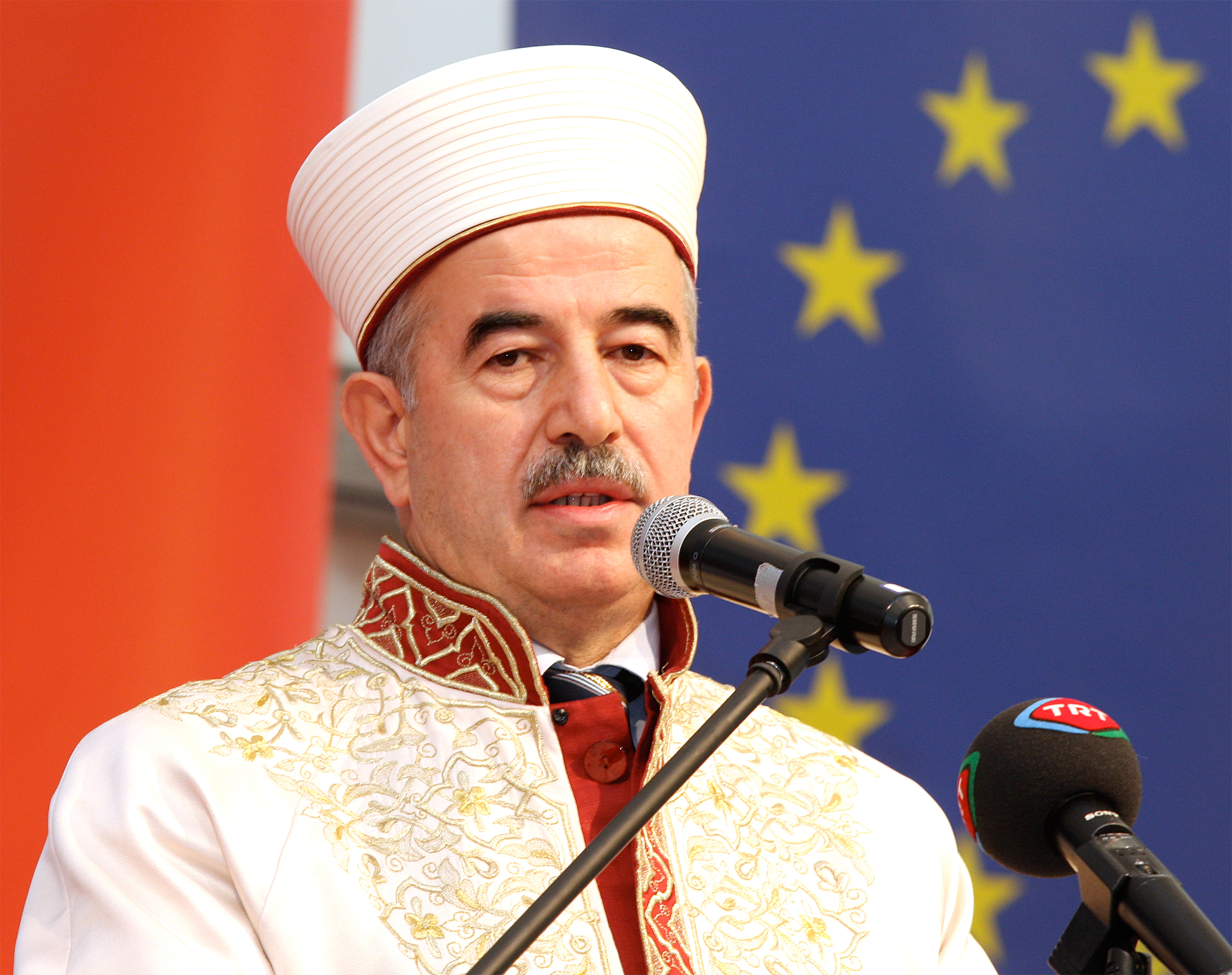

President of the Directorate of Religious Affairs
- In office 28 March 2003 – 11 November 2010
- President: Ahmet Necdet Sezer; Abdullah Gül
- Preceded by: Mehmet Nuri Yılmaz
- Succeeded by: Mehmet Görmez

Personal details
- Born: 1952 (age 73–74) Tosya, Kastamonu, Turkey
- Education: Istanbul University, Faculty of Law; Atatürk University, Islamic Studies
- Known for: Former president of Diyanet İşleri Başkanlığı

Ali Bardakoğlu (born 1952) served as the president of the Presidency of Religious Affairs (Turkish: Diyanet İşleri Başkanlığı) of Turkey between 2003 and 2010.

== Background ==
Ali Bardakoğlu was born in 1952 in Tosya in the province of Kastamonu. He was the president of the Diyanet İşleri Başkanlığı from May 2003 to November 2010. In 1975 he obtained a Bachelor of Arts degree in law from Istanbul University. Later he became an assistant for Islamic law at the High Islamic Institute in Kayseri. In 1982, he earned his PhD in Islamic studies from Atatürk University and taught as assistant professor at the theology faculty of the Erciyes University. From 1991 to 1992 he lived in the United Kingdom and in 1994 he visited the United States for the first time.

He is well known in Turkey and Europe as a moderate Islamic leader. He appointed, in 2005, two women from Diyanet Isleri as vice muftis (i.e. professional jurists who interpret Islamic law and counselor who help local Muslims on religious issues) for the mosques of the Turkish cities of Kayseri and Istanbul. In February 2006 he participated as an honored guest in the opening ceremony of a Protestant church in Alanya. He is one of the signatory Ulama of the Amman Message, which gives a broad foundation for defining Muslim orthodoxy.

He met with Pope Benedict XVI on November 28, 2006, in Ankara to help further interfaith dialog between Catholics and Muslims.

He speaks Turkish, Arabic and English. He is married and has three children.

Government offices
Preceded by Mehmet Nuri Yılmaz	President of Religious Affairs of Turkey; 2003–2010	Succeeded by Mehmet Görmez
