= Presidency of Religious Affairs =

Turkish state institution for religious affairs

- Logo of the Presidency of Religious Affairs
- Formation: 3 March 1924; 102 years ago
- Type: Islamic and religious education, administration of religious places
- Headquarters: Ankara, Turkey
- Location: Çankaya, Ankara, Turkey
- Official language: Turkish
- President: Safi Arpaguş
- Budget: $2 billion (2020)
- Website: Official website

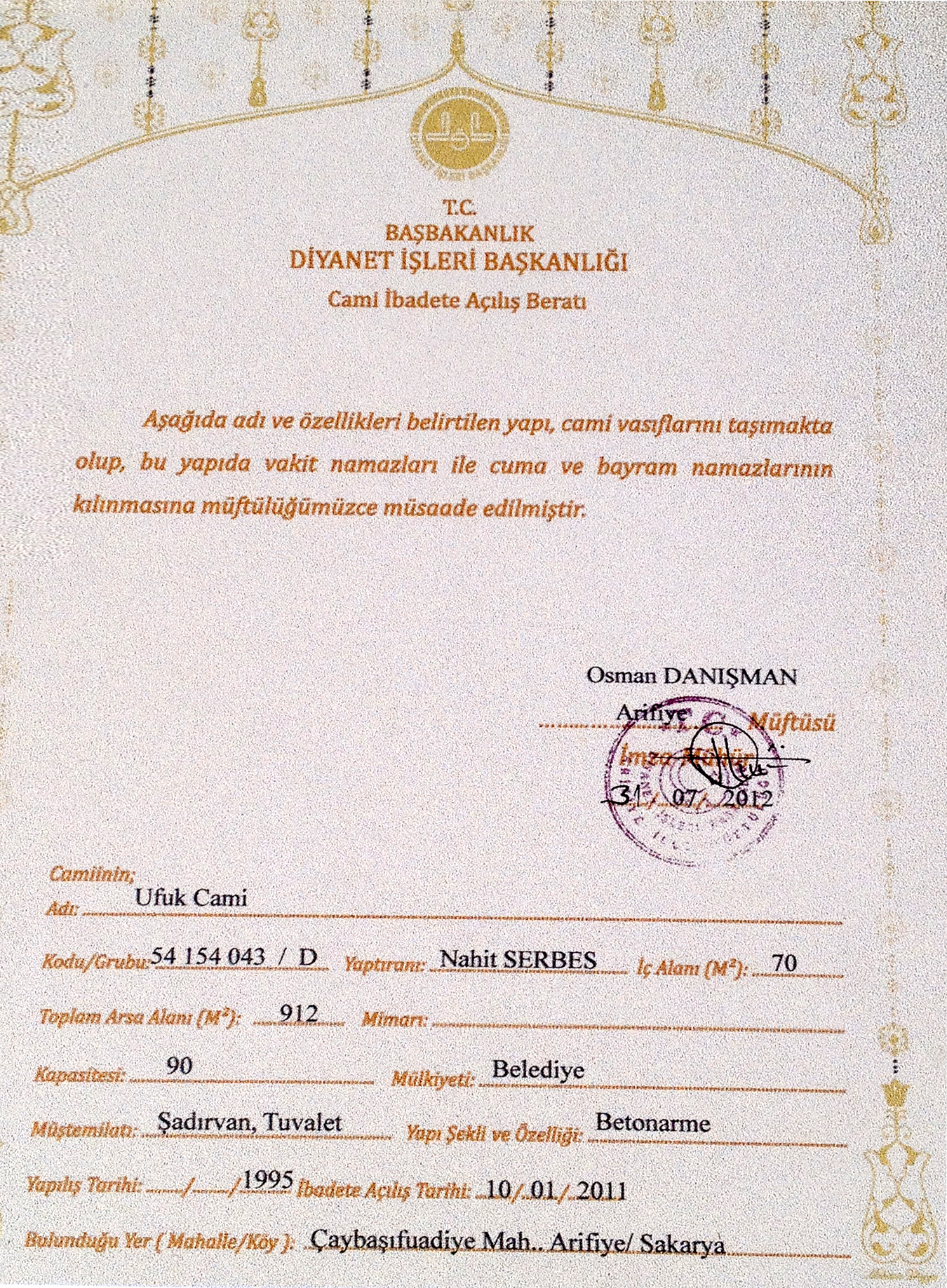
A typical example of a Diyanet document. Document given by Diyanet for the mosque built by the Circassian businessman and philanthropist Nahit Serbes.

The Presidency of Religious Affairs (Turkish: Diyanet İşleri Başkanlığı, commonly referred to as the Diyanet or DİB) is a state institution established in 1924 by the founding president of the Republic of Turkey Mustafa Kemal Atatürk. Initially created to manage religious duties which was previously overseen by the abolished Chiefdom of Islamic/Muslim Community (Shaykh al-Islām) before the establishment of the republic during the Ottoman Empire era, it later gained formal recognition under Article 136 of the Turkish constitution. The President of Religious Affairs effectively serves as the Grand Mufti of Turkey. This role is supported by a 16-member council elected from among clerics and university theology faculty.

As specified by law, the duties of the Diyanet are "to administer the affairs related to faith and worship of the religion of Islam". The Diyanet drafts a weekly sermon delivered at the nation's 85,000 mosques and more than 2,000 mosques abroad that function under the directorate. It provides Quranic education for children and trains and employs all of Turkey's imams, who are considered civil servants.

Starting from 2006, the Diyanet was fortified, by 2015 its budget had increased four-fold, and staff doubled to nearly 150,000. Its 2019 budget has been estimated at €1.7 billion ($1.87 billion), far exceeding that of most Turkish government ministries. It has 1,000 branches across Turkey and offers educational, cultural and charitable activities in 145 countries. Diyanet TV was launched in 2012, now broadcasting 24 hours a day. It has expanded Quranic education to early ages and boarding schools – "enabling the full immersion of young children in a religious lifestyle" – and now issues fatwa on demand.

== Activities and history ==
During the government of the Democrat Party, İmam Hatip schools which offered religious classes and were run by the Diyanet, were re-opened. The number of schools offering Quran classes rose from 61 in 1946 to 118 in 1948. From 1975 onwards, graduates of İmam Hatip schools were given the same status as regular high-school graduates and therefore they were granted permission to study at universities. In 1975 there were more than 300 İmam Hatip schools, with almost 300,000 students.

Türkiye Diyanet Foundation (Turkish: Türkiye Diyanet Vakfı) was established in 1975 to support the works of the Directorate of Religious Affairs, spread Islam, and raise clerics who would take on religious services. One of its major works is the 44 volume TDV Encyclopedia of Islam (Turkish: TDV İslam Ansiklopedisi), which is available online.

A 2021 academic publication summarized the Diyanet's growing activities as such: in 2012 it launched its own 24-hour satellite television channel, Diyanet Television, alongside presence on social media. The number of preschool Qur'an courses it offered went from 3,000 in 2000 to 16,200 in 2018, employing 24,463 instructors by the end of 2019, with nearly 4 million attending the summer Qur'anic courses in 2018 while aiming for 24 million by 2023. It had published 1,734 books as of 2019 and distributing 9 million books free of charge as of 2018.

Prior to 2010, the Diyanet had taken some non-traditional stances on gender and health issues. In 2005, 450 women were appointed vaizes (who are more senior than imams) by the Diyanet, and it deemed in vitro fertilisation and birth control pills "proper according to Islam".

In 2006, Pope Benedict XVI visited the Diyanet, where he met with its then president, Ali Bardakoğlu, and with various Turkish Muslim leaders, among them the Grand Muftis of Ankara and Istanbul.

In 2012, Turkish President Abdullah Gül visited the institution and said "it is undoubtedly one of the most important duties of the Religious Affairs Directorate [i.e. the Diyanet] to teach our religion to our people in the most correct, clear and concise way and steer them away from superstition".

The Diyanet also conducts research into Islamic literature and culture of minority peoples in Turkey and the Ottoman Empire, including Circassians and Bosnians. Diyanet has released studies about Mawlid songs in these languages.

=== Turkish Muslims outside the Diyanet ===
The Diyanet has been criticized for following the Hanafi school and being "indifferent to the diversity of other Turkish Islamic creeds", i.e. the non-Hanafi who make up "a third to two fifths" of Turkey's population. Non-Hanafi self-identified Muslims in Turkey include "about 9 million Alevis, perhaps two million Shia, and over a million Nusayris (Alawites)", plus the 15 million Sunni Kurds who follow the Shafi'i school and not the Hanafi school.

=== The Diyanet and the Alevi ===
The Diyanet's relations with the Alevi have been ambiguous. During the Government of Süleyman Demirel, the Diyanet's approach towards the Alevi became denialist in nature as Ibrahim Elmali was opposed to the mere existence of the Alevi stating "There is no such thing as Alevis". Additionally, during the early 2000s during a trial in the Turkish Court of Cassation, the Diyanet was strongly opposed to the recognition of Alevi associations or to research on Alevi heritage as it would lead to "separatism". The Ministry of Culture and also the Council of State criticized this approach as the Alevi represented a part of the Turkish culture. The Diyanet responded denying any existence of an Alevi religion. The Alevi were much more on the political agenda during the tenure of Mehmet Görmez, in which for the first time in the Diyanet's history, an Alevi question was acknowledged.

=== 2010 and after ===
In 2010–2011, Diyanet began its transformation to "a supersized government bureaucracy for the promotion of Sunni Islam". Diyanet chairman Ali Bardakoğlu, who had been appointed by a secularist president, was fired in late 2010 and replaced by Mehmet Görmez. In 2010, while the AKP was involved in policy changes that ended bans on hijab, Bardakoğlu refused to recommend that Muslim women wear the hijab, saying the religion does not require it.

Under the AKP government, the budget of the Diyanet quadrupled to over $2 billion by 2015, making its budget allocation 40 percent greater than the Ministry of the Interior's and equal to those of the Foreign, Energy, and Culture and Tourism ministries combined. It now employs between 120,000 and 150,000 employees.

Reforms undertaken in the administration of the İmam Hatip schools in 2012 have led to what one Turkish commentator called "the removal, in practice, of one of the most important laws of the revolution, the Tevhid-i Tedrisat (unity of education)".

The Diyanet has been accused of serving for the ruling AKP party, and of lavish spending (an expensive car and Jacuzzi for its head Mehmet Görmez).

Following the July 2016 coup attempt, President Recep Tayyip Erdoğan removed 492 religious officials from the Diyanet.

Also in 2016, Diyanet instructed affiliated imams and religious instances to collect detailed information on the Gülen movement. It handed 50 intelligence reports from 38 countries over to the Turkish parliament. The Diyanet's imams are involved, under the auspices of the National Intelligence Organization, in the Turkish state's efforts to monitor its citizens abroad, particularly those suspected of involvement with the Gulen movement, the Kurdistan Workers Party, and the Revolutionary People's Liberation Party/Front.

In 2017, some argued that "Diyanet's implication in Turkish domestic and foreign politics opens a new chapter on Erdoğan's increasing authoritarianism".

In 2018 Mustafa Çağrıcı claimed "The Diyanet of today has a more Islamist, more Arab worldview". The same year, Diyanet has suggested citizens practice e-fasting during Ramadan. E-fasting refers to cutting down on use of technologies such as smartphones, laptops and social media.

== Criticism ==
The DRA has been accused of eroding the secular constitution of Turkey with the appointment of hardline religious clerics and the promotion of Islam into civil society.

=== Fatwas ===
The Diyanet began issuing fatwas on request sometime after 2011, and their number has been "rising rapidly". Among the activities it found forbidden (haram) in Islam over a one-year period ending in late 2015 were: "feeding dogs at home, celebrating the western New Year, lotteries, and tattoos".

Use of toilet paper is not prohibited by the Diyanet on condition water is also used. This matter was misunderstood by some non-Muslims since the majority do not use water for cleaning following urination or defecation. Muslims are required to purify themselves with water following these and some other bodily excretions. In an April 2015 fatwa that made news outside of Turkey's borders, the Diyanet ruled its usage permissible within Islam though it emphasized that water should be the primary source of cleansing.

Fatwa of the Diyanet that have come under criticism from some members of the Turkish public include an early 2016 ruling that engaged couples should not hold hands or spend time alone during their engagement period.

=== Controversies ===
In January 2016 a controversy arose over a fatwa which briefly appeared on the fatwa section of the Diyanet website, answering a reader's question on whether a man's marriage would become invalid from a religious perspective if the man felt sexual desire for his daughter. The Diyanet posted a reply stating that there was a difference of opinion among Islam's different Madhhab (schools of religious jurisprudence). "For some, a father kissing his daughter with lust or caressing her with desire has no effect on the man's marriage," but the Hanafi school believed that the daughter's mother would become haram (forbidden) to such a man. A "social media storm" ensued with "scores of users appealed to the Telecommunications Presidency's Internet Hotline accusing Turkey's top religious body of 'encouraging child abuse'." The Diyanet subsequently removed the answer from its website, posting that the fatwa page was "under repair." It later issued an official statement to the press, insisting that its response was distorted through "tricks, wiliness and wordplay" aiming to discredit the institution, and that it would take legal action against news reports of the response. (Note: According to a 2015 Freedom House report, authorities in Turkey "continued to aggressively use the penal code, criminal defamation laws, and the antiterrorism law to crack down on journalists and media outlets. Verbal attacks on journalists by senior politicians—including Recep Tayyip Erdoğan, the incumbent prime minister who was elected president in August—were often followed by harassment and even death threats against the targeted journalists on social media.")

Following the 2023 Turkey–Syria earthquake, in response to a question on adopting children orphaned by the earthquake, the Diyanet caused controversy by pointing out that in Islam adopted children can be married to their parents and while adoption was praiseworthy, adopted children were not kin. The question had not mentioned marriage to adopted children. Activist groups criticized this as "paving the way for child abuse" while the Turkish Bars Association and secularist newspapers further pointed out that it violated the articles of the Turkish civil code that allows inheritance and bans marriage between adopted children and their step-parents. The Diyanet issued a second statement after the controversy, claiming it had been misrepresented. The statement reiterated its initial ruling but also included that the laws of the country should be followed.

== International ==
The Diyanet provides services and is active in countries with a significant Turkish diaspora. As of 2018, the Diyanet was present with 61 branches in 38 countries.

=== Australia ===
The Diyanet provides services to about a dozen mosques and associations in Australia. The Diyanet has an office in Sydney and Melbourne that are responsible for different states. Some of the major mosques in Sydney and Melbourne are administered by the Diyanet including Sunshine Mosque and Auburn Gallipoli Mosque. Some of the regional mosques administered by the Diyanet include Mildura and Shepparton in Victoria, Wollongong in NSW, Renmark in South Australia, Forestdale and Bundaberg in Queensland.

=== Austria ===
The Avusturya Türk Islam Kültür ve Sosyal Yardımlaşma Birliği (abbreviated ATIB) is the largest Muslim organization in Austria and in 2018 had between 75 and 100 thousand members.

The roots of the ATIB are found in Turkish immigration to Austria from the 1960s onwards. The goal of its foundation was to create a Turkish-nationalist movement of Islam and to prevent adherents from joining mosques run by the Millî Görüş. As a new religious law came into effect in 2015 in Austria, Islamic congregations and community organisations had to find domestic sources of revenue as foreign financing of religious institutions was banned. The then-president of the Diyanet, Mehmet Görmez (2011–2017) called for Muslims to argue against the new law. In 2019, a number of imams employed by the ATIB, who had to leave the country due to the new regulations, launched a legal challenge the regulations which was rejected by the Constitutional Court of Austria. An immigrant party called Social Austria of the Future has ties to Diyanet.

=== Belgium ===
The Diyanet, under Fondation religieuse islamique turque de Belgique, controls 70 out of the 300 mosques in Belgium and forms the largest network of Muslim communities. In comparison to other Muslim organizations it has a simple method of operation. Muslims in Belgium buy or construct a mosque and donate the premises to the Diyanet. The Diyanet will then send an imam trained in Turkey and pay his salary. The imam will stay a few years and then be rotated back to Turkey to pursue a career or be sent to another Diyanet mosque abroad. The imams are officials of the Turkish state.

=== Cyprus ===
The Diyanet overlooks TRNC Directorate of Religious Affairs in the island of Cyprus, particularly in Northern Cyprus.

=== Denmark ===
The "Danish Turkish Islamic Foundation" (Danish: Dansk Tyrkisk Islamisk Stiftelse) is part of the Diyanet and is the largest Muslim organisation in Denmark. The Diyanet's major competing Islamic networks are the Millî Görüş as well as the Alevi association.

=== France ===
The Diyanet controls about 270 mosques in France and pays the salaries of about 150 Turkish imams in the country.

=== Germany ===
The Turkish-Islamic Union for Religious Affairs (German: Türkisch-Islamische Union der Anstalt für Religion e.V., Turkish: Diyanet İşleri Türk-İslam Birliği), usually referred to as DİTİB, was founded in 1984. As of 2016, the DİTİB funds 900 mosques in Germany. The headquarters of DİTİB is the Cologne Central Mosque in Cologne-Ehrenfeld.

=== Japan ===
Tokyo Camii and Diyanet Turkish Cultural Center was established as the "Tokyo Camii Foundation" under the Presidency of Religious Affairs of Turkey in 1997. 12 imams have served in the mosque as of 2022.

=== Netherlands ===
Of the 475 mosques in the Netherlands in 2018, a plurality (146) are controlled by the Turkish Directorate of Religious Affairs (Diyanet). Diyanet implements the political ideology of the Turkish AKP party and employ imams trained in Turkey in mosques under its control. Critics argue that the Diyanet imams, some of whom do not speak Dutch, hinder the effective integration of Dutch-Turkish Muslims into the society of the Netherlands by promoting allegiance to the Turkish state while neglecting to promote loyalty to the Dutch state.

=== Sweden ===
The Diyanet headquarter in Sweden is a foundation based in Huddinge.

According to public service radio SR in 2017, the Diyanet runs nine mosques and pays the salaries of 14 imams in Sweden. After the failed coup in 2016, many of them wrote strongly worded posts on social media condemning the Gülen movement and other opponents of the Erdoğan rule. Along with their religious duties, the imams are also tasked with reporting on critics of the Turkish government. According to Dagens Nyheter, propaganda for president Erdoğan and the AKP party is presented in the mosques. An Islamist party called Nuance Party has ties to Diyanet.

=== United Kingdom ===
Established in 2001, the UK branch of the Diyanet operated 17 mosques in 2018. It was also a main force behind the construction of the first eco-friendly European Mosque in Cambridge.

=== United States ===
The Diyanet runs over a dozen mosques in the United States of America from the Diyanet Center of America based in the suburbs of the Washington D.C. Metropolitan Area.

== Presidents ==
The following people have presided over the institution:

Image	Name	Tenure	
Image	Name	Began	End
	Mehmet Rifat Börekçi	1924	1941
	Mehmet Şerefettin Yaltkaya	1942	1947
	Ahmet Hamdi Akseki	1947	1951
	Eyüp Sabri Hayırlıoğlu	1951	1960
	Ömer Nasuhi Bilmen	1960	1961
	Hasan Hüsnü Erdem	1961	1964
	Mehmet Tevfik Gerçeker	1964	1965
	İbrahim Bedrettin Elmalılı	1965	1966
	Ali Rıza Hakses	1966	1968
	Lütfi Doğan	1968	1972
	Lütfi Doğan	1972	1976
	Süleyman Ateş	1976	1978
	Tayyar Altıkulaç	1978	1986
	Mustafa Sait Yazıcıoğlu	1986	1992
	Mehmet Nuri Yılmaz	1992	2003
	Ali Bardakoğlu	2003	2010
	Mehmet Görmez	2010	2017
	Ali Erbaş	2017	2025
	Safi Arpaguş	2025	-

== See also ==
- Conservatism in Turkey
- Religion in Turkey
- Islam in Turkey
- Secularism in Turkey
- Politics of Turkey
- Freedom of religion in Turkey
- Shaykh al-Islām
- Christianity in Turkey
- Indonesian Ulema Council
- National Commission on Muslim Filipinos

== Bibliography ==
- Nielsen, Jørgen S.; Akgonul, Samim; Alibasic, Ahmet (2009), Yearbook of Muslims in Europe, BRILL, ISBN 978-90-04-17505-1
- Yücel, İrfan (1994). "DİYANET İŞLERİ BAŞKANLIĞI". TDV Encyclopedia of Islam, Vol. 9 (Dârüsaâde – Dulkadi̇roğulları) (in Turkish). Istanbul: Presidency of Religious Affairs, Centre for Islamic Studies. pp. 455–460. ISBN 978-975-389-436-4.
