= Mustafa Çağrıcı =

Turkish theologian

Prof. Dr. Mustafa Çağrıcı

Personal life
- Born: 1950 (age 75–76) Şarkışla, Sivas, Turkey
- Main interest(s): History of religion, Hadith, Islamic philosophy, History of Islam, Kalam, Sufism, Tafsir
- Notable works: Gazzâlî’ye Göre İslâm Ahlâkı: Nazari ve Ameli Olarak; Anahatlarıyla İslâm Ahlâkı; İslâm Düşüncesinde Ahlâk
- Education: Marmara University

Religious life
- Religion: Islam
- Denomination: Sunni
- Jurisprudence: Hanafi
- Creed: Maturidi

Muslim leader
- Influenced by: Al-Ghazali, al-Kindi, Ibn Hazm

Mustafa Çağrıcı is a Turkish former mufti of Istanbul.

In 2018 he claimed “The Diyanet of today has a more Islamist, more Arab worldview”.
