= İmam hatip school =

Vocational schools in Turkey for cultivating muslims

İmam hatip School
- İmam hatip okulu
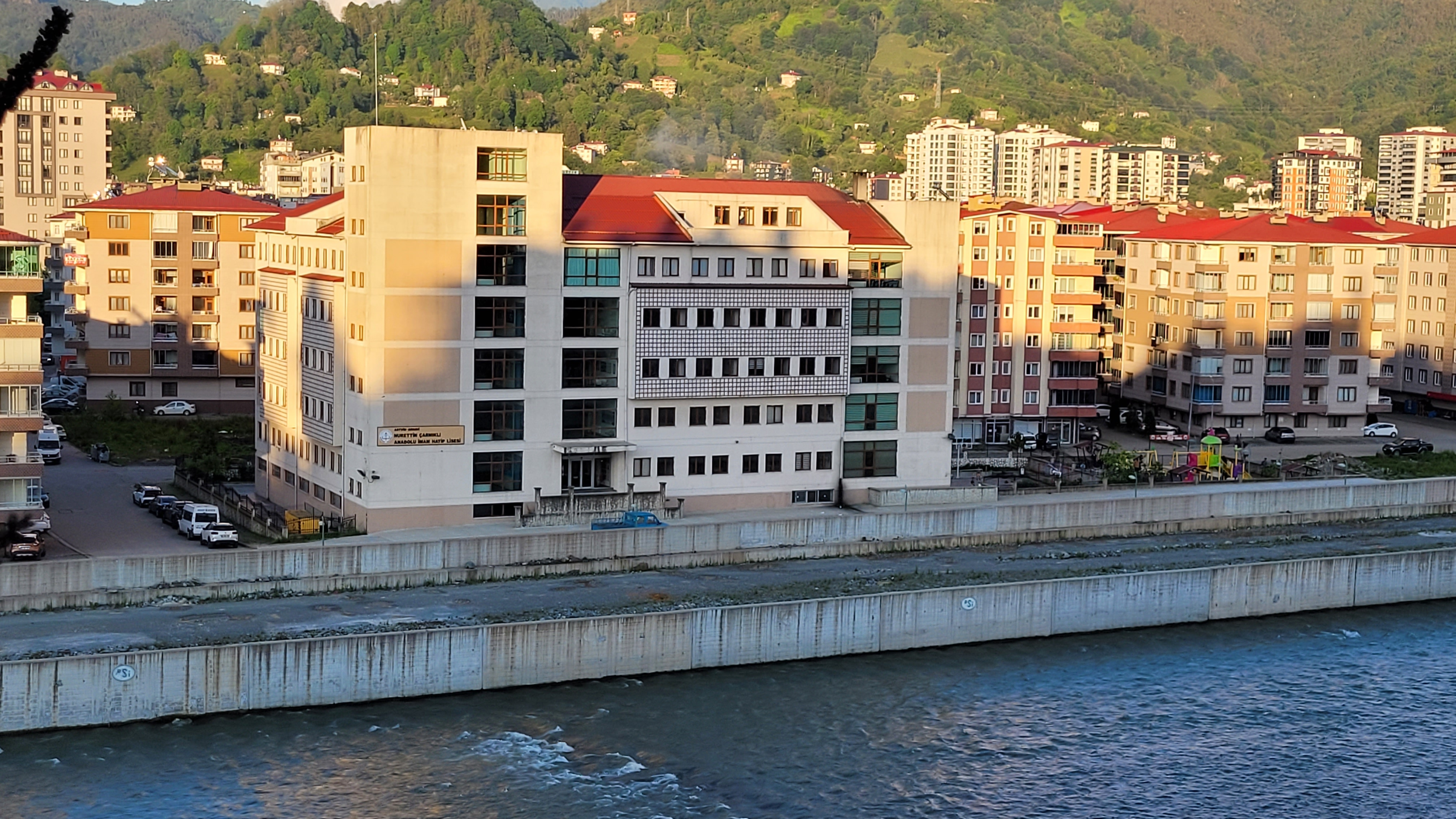
- An imam hatip school in Artvin
- Turkey

Information
- Type: Secondary education
- Established: 1951 (re-opened)
- Founder: Democrat Party
- Status: Open
- Gender: Co-educational

In Turkey, an imam hatip school (Turkish: imam hatip okulu, 'hatip' coming from Arabic khatib) is a secondary education institution. It was founded in lieu of a vocational school to train government employed imams; after madrasas in Turkey were abolished by the Unification of Education Act (Turkish: Tevhid-i Tedrisat Kanunu).

== History ==
During the Ottoman Empire, a key objective of education was to raise 'good Muslims'. Thus there was a need for Islamic scholars, which was sustained through Islamic Theology Schools, called Madrasa. In 1913, the Medresetü-l Eimmeti vel Hutaba (School of ministers and preachers, Ottoman Turkish: مدرسة الأئمة والخطباء) and Medresetü-l Vaazin (Schools for Preachers, Ottoman Turkish: مدرسة الواعظين) were combined to form the tangible origins of today's imam hatip high schools.

In 1924, the Tevhid-i Tedrisat (Law of Unification of Educational Instruction, Ottoman Turkish: توحيدِ تدريسات) was passed, replacing the existing, mostly sectarian educational system with a secular, centralist and nationalist education one. The new law brought all educational institutions under the control of the Ministry of National Education. A Faculty of Theology at the Darülfünun (Istanbul University), special schools for training imams and hatips (ministers and preachers) were opened by the new Ministry of National Education.

In 1949, a Faculty of Theology at University of Ankara was established. First steps for the establishment of special imam hatip schools began in 1951 under the Democrat Party government, which set up seven special secondary schools (Imam Hatip Okulları). In addition, in 1959 Islamic Institutes were opened for graduates of imam hatip schools.

Following the coup d'etat in 1960, imam hatip schools encountered the threat of closure. Following the return to civilian politics and the introduction of the new constitution in 1961, graduates of imam hatip schools could enrol in university programmes only if they had passed courses offered at secular schools. During the premiership of Süleyman Demirel however, graduates of imam hatip schools were given access to university programmes without such requirements. The 1971 Turkish coup d'état introduced two key reforms: firstly junior high imam hatip schools were abolished, and in 1973 imam hatip schools were renamed as imam hatip high schools. Under the subsequent National Education Basic Law, imam hatip schools were defined as vocational schools, where students were to be trained as preachers and ministers or prepared for higher education.

İmam hatip schools grew slowly at first, but their numbers expanded rapidly to 334 during the 1970s. The coalition government of 1974, established by the CHP and the MSP (National Salvation Party), committed to reopen junior high schools and giving the right of entry to university through examination. 230 new imam hatip high schools were opened in a period of nearly four years. During the 1974-75 school year the number of students attending to the imam hatip high schools grew to 48,895. This number subsequently grew to 200,300 by 1980-81. In addition, females gained the right of entry to imam hatip high schools in 1976. The proliferation of imam hatip high schools is often cited as the effect of the National Salvation Party's membership of a number of coalitions with Nationalist Front governments.

== Situation since 1980 ==
The coup d'etat of September 12, 1980 is a critical turning point in the history of Turkey and also for the history of imam hatip high schools. Under military governance, graduates of imam hatip high schools gained the right of entry to all university departments. In 1985, two new imam hatip high schools opened, one in Tunceli, despite the so-called ethno-sectarian structure of the region, and the other in Beykoz as an Anatolian imam hatip high school, with the aim of contributing to the education of children of families who work abroad. Although the number of imam hatip high schools had not increased since, the number of students attending imam hatip high schools has increased by 45%. This is partly due to the improvement in the quality of imam hatip high schools and the education offered at such schools.

During the education year of 1973-74, the total number of imam hatip students was 34,570; in 1997 this number had sharply increased to reach 511,502. Alongside this massive increase in popularity, the number of schools also increased. The number of imam hatip junior high schools reached 601 and senior high schools 402. The increase in both student and school numbers can be attributed to factors including the commitment of people to religion, dormitory facilities, scholarships, the admittance of females and an increase in demand for religious education.

Research suggests that between the years of 1993 and 2000, prospective students registered at imam hatip high schools primarily to receive religious tutoring alongside a more general education. In addition, research shows enrollment at imam hatip high schools was based solely on the student's decision. The third proposed factor in the rise in popularity of imam hatip schools is the admission of female students in 1976. By 1998, almost 100,000 females attended imam hatip high schools, making up almost half of all students. This statistic is particularly revealing because women are not eligible to become either priests or ministers.

However, the introduction of eight years of compulsory education in 1997 has seen a sudden decline in the popularity of imam hatip schools. In 1999, the reclassification of imam hatip schools as "vocational schools" meant that, although more options had been made available to graduates, attaining places at prestigious university courses became more difficult. By requiring that all eight compulsory years of schooling be spent under the same primary-school roof, middle schools were abolished. Children could not enter vocational schools (one of them the imam hatip school) until the ninth grade (rather than the sixth, as before).

By the mid-1990s, imam hatip schools were attracting some 11 percent of children in the relevant age group and developing into a parallel system of education. When the Justice and Development Party (AK Party) came to power in 2002, only about 2 percent of eligible children attended clerical schools. The reform in education introduced in March 2012 extended mandatory schooling to 12 years and divided into four years of primary school, four years of middle school and four years of high school. In 2002 attendance at imam hatip schools was about 60,000; by 2017 this number had increased to over 1.1 million (about 10% of all public-school students). Pro-imam hatip school reforms undertaken by the AK Party government include reducing the minimum population requirement for areas where the schools are allowed to open from 50,000 to 5,000 and lowering the age at which children can enter them from fourteen to ten.

== Criticism ==
Since their creation in the 1950s, imam hatips have been controversial in the debate about Turkey's secular state. Kenan Cayir, assistant professor of sociology at Istanbul's Istanbul Bilgi University, says the schools can have a positive impact so that religion and modernity can be together. An objection to the free choice of imam hatip graduates came from TÜSIAD (Turkish Industrialists' and Businessmen's Association). According to their research conducted in 1988, approximately 32% of graduates of imam hatip schools picked faculties of law as their first choice in university entrance exams, proving more popular than religious based alternatives. The report concluded that, due to fundamental differences in their upbringing, imam hatip graduates were rendered unsuitable for public office. Politicians tended not to agree with TÜSIAD's position. For example, the then Minister of National Education, Avni Akyol, criticised the report in terms of human rights, claiming such proposals undermined the principle of equal opportunity in education.

Following the reforms of March 2012 that extended compulsory education to 12 years and allowed for imam hatip schools to be opened for "middle school" level (second term of four years), experts warned that the possible increase in the number of imam hatip schools was not in line with people's expectations and described it as a "top-down" process. Critics noted that the new education system seemed to be a revenge being taken for imam hatip schools that were shut down after 1997. A survey conducted by the Turkey İmam-Hatip Alumni Foundation (TİMAV), revealed that the majority of Turks hold positive views about imam hatip schools. The survey, titled "Perception of İmam-Hatip High Schools and İmam-Hatip Students in Turkey", was conducted between April 24 and May 18, 2012 with 2,689 people in 26 provinces. Most of the respondents were not imam hatip graduates.

The bill of March 2012 was written without public debate — or even discussion in the education ministry's own consultative body, the National Education Council — and it did not figure in the government's 2011 election manifesto. According to education specialists, the new measures would undermine educational standards and deepen social inequalities. The education faculties of most of Turkey's leading universities — including Sabancı University, Boğaziçi University, Middle East Technical University and Koç University all issued press statements describing the reforms of 2012 as "hastily conceived, retrograde and out of step with current thinking".

== Notable alumni ==
- Cemal Çavdarlı (born 1966), Former Belgian MP (2003-2007)
- Ahmet Hakan Coşkun (born 1967), journalist
- Ömer Dinçer (born 1956), academician, politician and former government minister
- Nazım Ekren (born 1956), Deputy Prime Minister of Turkey
- Recep Tayyip Erdoğan (born 1954), former mayor of Istanbul, former Prime Minister of Turkey and leader of Justice and Development Party (AK Party), now President of the Republic of Turkey
- Mehmet Müezzinoğlu (born 1955), physician and minister of health

== See also ==
- Education in Turkey
