= Solmaz Ünaydın =

Turkish diplomat

Turkey Ambassador to Japan
- In office 1 January 2003 – 1 January 2007
- President: Ahmet Necdet Sezer
- Preceded by: Yaman Başkut
- Succeeded by: Selim Sermet Atacanlı

Turkey Ambassador to Poland
- In office 12 November 1996 – 17 November 1998
- President: Süleyman Demirel
- Preceded by: Korkmaz Haktanır
- Succeeded by: Ateş Balkan

Turkey Ambassador to Sweden
- In office 1992–1996
- President: Turgut Özal; Süleyman Demirel
- Preceded by: Orhan Ertuğruloğlu
- Succeeded by: Oktay Aksoy

Personal details
- Born: 1942 Ankara, Turkey
- Died: 26 August 2010 (aged 67–68) Ankara, Turkey
- Resting place: Cebeci Asri Cemetery
- Spouse: Tevfik Ünaydın (married 1975)
- Education: Bryn Mawr College
- Profession: Diplomat

Solmaz Ünaydın (1942 – 26 August 2010) was a Turkish diplomat and ambassador.

== Private life ==
After completing her secondary education at TED Ankara College with honours, Solamz Ünaydı was educated in International Relations, Economics and International Law at Bryn Mawr College in the United States. Later, she received a Master's degree in International Relations from her alma mater.

She married diplomat Tevfik Ünaydın (1927-2012) in 1975.

Ünaydın died in Ankara on 26 August 2010. She was interred at the Cebeci Asri Cemetery following the religious service at Kocatepe Mosque. She was survived by her mother Melahat Baydur and her spouse Tevfik Ünaydın.

== Career ==
Ünayedın entered joined the Ministry of Foreign Affairs in 1967. After working in Department for Middle East, she was appointed to her first position abroad at the Permanent Representative of Turkey to the United Nations (UN), where she served for three years. She then was assigned to the diplomatic mission in Cairo, Egypt. After working again in the Department for Middle East in the Ministry, she became Undersecretary at the UN office. Returned home, she became head of the Department for Middle East, and then was promoted to Deputy Director General. She gained diplomatic experience during the crisis prior to the Gulf War in 1990–91.

She served as Ambassador of Turkey to Sweden between 1992 and 1996. In 1992 Fügen Ok was appointed permanent representative of Turkey to the United Nations, and they became the highest-rank women diplomats in Turkey after Filiz Dinçmen. Ünaydın served as the Ambassador of Turkey to Poland from 12 November 1996 to 17 November 1998. After her return to Turkey, she served as Director General of the departments for Overseas Promotion and then for Policy Planning. On 1 January 2003, Ünaydın took office in Tokyo as ambassador, where she served just four years long.

After her retirement in 2007, she chaired Turkey's publicity campaign for the Expo 2015.

== Criticism ==
In a newspaper interview, she delivered in August 2006, Ünaydın criticized the early personnel policy and discrimination practices against women in the Ministry. She claimed that "during the application, women candidates were examined for 45 minutes while the interview time for the men applicants were only 15 minutes". She added that "there existed three criteria for the recruiting diplomats: they must be male, and graduate of Galatasaray High School and Faculty of Political Science, Ankara University". She told that "she prepared herself six months long for the application exam after her return from the United States". She said that "she had to wait eight years for her appointment as an ambassador while her male associates reached that position in three or four years". Solmaz Ünaydın was the second woman ambassador, who was promoted to this position after Filiz Dinçmen.

She admitted that "all those discrimination were finally thrown over now".
