= Pakistani 10-rupee coin =

Denomination of the Pakistani rupee

10 rupee
- Pakistan
- Mass: 5.50 g
- Diameter: 25.5 mm
- Years of minting: 2016–present

Obverse
- Design: Lettering of "Islami Jamhooria Pakistan" along the periphery above, crescent moon and five-pointed star at centre facing northwest. Year of issuance below the crescent, with two wheat sprigs curving upwards below. Circle of small beads adorning the edge.
- Designer: State Bank of Pakistan

Reverse
- Design: Faisal Mosque front view at centre, doves in flight above.
- Designer: State Bank of Pakistan

The Pakistani 10-rupee coin (Rs. 10) is a denomination of the Pakistani rupee.

The 10-rupee coin is a yellow, round piece with a serrated edge, a weight of 5.50 grams, and a diameter of 25.5mm.

== History ==
On July 17, 2016, the federal government of Pakistan authorized the State Bank of Pakistan (SBP) to distribute a Rs10 coin. The coin was issued on October 24, 2016, by the State Bank of Pakistan.

In April 2023, it was reported that the 10-rupee coin has faced challenges in gaining widespread acceptance as a legal tender.

== Obverse ==
The coin's obverse side features a waxing crescent moon and a five-pointed star in a rising position facing northwest. The Urdu inscription "Islami Jamhooria Pakistan" is inscribed along the periphery above the star and the moon. The year of issuance is displayed below the crescent, above two upwardly curved wheat sprigs. A circle of small beads adorns the coin's edge.

== Reverse ==
The reverse side of the coin carries an image of the front view of the Faisal Mosque with doves in flight above it.
