= Ünaydın =

Ünaydın is a Turkish surname. Notable people with the surname include:

- Ruşen Eşref Ünaydın (1892–1959), Turkish linguist, politician, and diplomat
- Solmaz Ünaydın (1942–2010), Turkish diplomat
