= Vehicle registration plates of Pakistan =

Islamic Republic of Pakistan
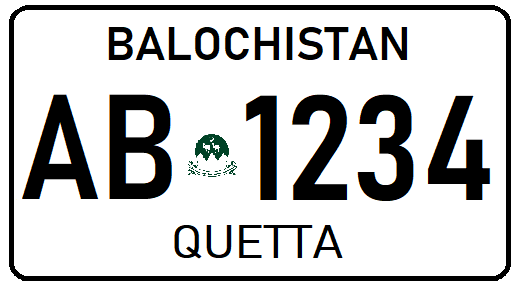
- Regular legal standard number plate from the Pakistani province of Balochistan.
- Country: Pakistan
- Country code: PK

Current series
- Size: 30.48 cm × 15.24 cm 12.00 in × 6.00 in
- Serial format: AAHN-499(will depend on the administrative unit)
- Colour (front): Will depend on the administrative unit
- Colour (rear): Will depend on the administrative unit

Vehicle registration plates of Pakistan are issued by an agency of the provincial or territorial government. Generally, the appearance of plates is frequently chosen to contain symbols, colours, or slogans associated with the issuing jurisdiction. All vehicle registration plates use the Latin alphabet. Every vehicle has a unique registration plate number in Pakistan.

== Design ==
Vehicle registration plate numbers are usually assigned in ascending order, beginning with a starting point such as AAA-001. Thus, someone familiar with the sequence can determine roughly when the vehicle registration plate was issued. Depending on where the number plate was registered, the plate could have two to three numbers and three to four letters. The letters I, O and U are not used to avoid confusion with 1, 0 and V. Many provinces distinguish their vehicle registration plates through distinctive colour schemes and logos. For example, the Datura metel flower has appeared on every Punjab plate since 2007. In Sindh, plates have long featured the provincial coat of arms with a distinctive yellow background. Islamabad Capital Territory recently unveiled a new plate with Faisal Mosque in the background. Typically, the registration number is embossed. Other identifying information, such as the name of the issuing jurisdiction and the vehicle class, can be either surface-printed or embossed. The Government of Pakistan fixed the size for all their passenger vehicle registration plates at 150 mm (6 in) in height by 300 mm (12 in) in width (the same as those in the United States), although these figures may vary slightly by jurisdiction. Smaller-sized plates are used for motorcycles, scooters and rickshaws.

== Ownership ==
Between 2024 and 2025, Pakistan's vehicle registration framework underwent a transition from a vehicle-based system to an owner-based system. Under the earlier model, number plates were issued to a specific vehicle and remained with it even after a change in ownership. New provincial and federal policies instead linked registration numbers directly to the owner's Computerized National Identity Card.

In the Islamabad Capital Territory, the Excise and Taxation Department introduced a policy under which number plates are issued to individuals rather than vehicles. When a vehicle is sold, the seller retains the registration number for use on a future vehicle, while the buyer is required to obtain a new plate under their own CNIC. The reforms also introduced personalised number plates and digital registration cards to improve record verification and administrative efficiency.

The Punjab government implemented a similar policy, linking all vehicle registration numbers to the owner's CNIC. Under this system, legal responsibility for the registration mark remained with the registered individual even after the vehicle was sold.

In Khyber Pakhtunkhwa, the provincial government introduced "citizen-owned" number plates as part of a broader digital overhaul of the motor registration system. The policy granted lifetime ownership of a specific registration number to individuals, effectively ending the informal resale of so-called "fancy" numbers. The reforms aimed to establish a more consistent and secure registration database for administrative and law enforcement use.

== Federal plates ==
Pakistan vehicle registration plates
Ministry/Department	Image	Example	Description
Government of Pakistan			Plates are green with white letters and numbers.
Foreign Diplomats			Plates are red with white letters and numbers.
Armed Forces of PakistanGp 1011			Plates are black with white letters and numbers.
Police			Plates are black with white letters and numbers.
NGO/Semi Government			Plates are blue with white letters and numbers.

== Provincial plates ==
Each province and territory has its own vehicle registration plate design.

=== Azad Jammu & Kashmir ===
Azad Jammu & Kashmir vehicle registration plates
Vehicle Type	Image	Example	Description
Cars			Plates are white with black letters and numbers. The plates consist of two letters and three numbers, with AJ&K written above and the name of the issuing city below. There is a white strip on the left, with the state symbol, a single Chinar or Oriental Plane (Platanus orientalis) leaf.
Motorcycles		AA·BB; 000	Plates are white with black letters and numbers. The plates consist of four letters and three numbers, with AJK written above only.
Public transport		AA·BB·000	Plates are yellow with black letters and numbers. The plates consist of four letters and three numbers, with Azad Jammu & Kashmir written above and the name of the issuing city below.
Government		AA·BB·000	Plates are green with black letters and numbers. The plates consist of four letters and three numbers, with Azad Jammu & Kashmir written above.

=== Balochistan ===
Balochistan vehicle registration plates
Vehicle Type	Image	Example	Description
Cars			Plates are white with black letters and numbers. The plates consist of two letters and three numbers with the Balochistan coat of arms between them. Balochistan written above and the name of the issuing city below.
Motorcycles		AA; 000	Plates are white with black letters and numbers. The plates consist of two letters and four numbers, with Balochistan written above and the name of the issuing city below.
Public transport		AA·000	Plates are yellow with black letters and numbers. The plates consist of two letters and four numbers, with Balochistan written above and the name of the issuing city below.
Government		AA·000	Plates are green with white letters and numbers. The plates consist of four letters and three numbers, with Balochistan written above.

=== Gilgit-Baltistan ===
Gilgit-Baltistan vehicle registration plates
Vehicle Type	Image	Example	Description
Cars			Plates are black with white letters and numbers. The plates consist of three letters and two numbers. There is a blue strip on the left, with GB written below and the Markhor symbol above.
Motorcycles			
Public transport			
Government			

=== Islamabad Capital Territory ===
Islamabad Capital Territory vehicle registration plates
Vehicle Type	Image	Example	Description
Cars			Plates are white with black letters and numbers. The plates consist of two letters and three numbers, with ICT-ISLAMABAD written below. There is a dark blue strip on the left, with the territory symbol, an image of Faisal Mosque.
Motorcycles			Same as the car plates but with a different aspect ratio.
Public transport			Government owned public transport have government plates, non government owned public transport have regular car plates.
Government			Plates are green with white letters and numbers

=== Khyber Pakhtunkhwa ===
Khyber Pakhtunkhwa vehicle registration plates
Vehicle Type	Image	Example	Description
Cars			Plates are white with black letters and numbers. The plates consist of two letters and four numbers with the Khyber Pakhtunkhwa's coat of arms between them. Khyber Pakhtunkhwa is written above and the name of the issuing city below. Issuing cities are Peshawar, Charsadda, Nowshera, Abbottabad, Bannu, and Kohat.
Motorcycles		AA; 000	Plates are white plate with black letters, but smaller in dimension. The plates consist of two letters above and three numbers below with the Khyber Pakhtunkhwa's coat of arms on the left. KP is written above and the name of the issuing city below. Issuing cities are Peshawar, Charsadda, Nowshera, Abbottabad, Bannu, and Kohat.
Public transport		AA·000	Plates are yellow with black letters.
Government		AA·000	Plates are green with white letters.

=== Punjab ===
Punjab vehicle registration plates
Vehicle Type	Image	Example	Description
Cars			Plates are all white with black letters and numbers. "PUNJAB" is written on the top with a logo of Government of Punjab on the left side and ET&NC is written on the right side as well. New Punjab Plates have three digit registration numbers for cars. However vehicles registered before August 2020 have four digit numbers on them and they have the issuing year on them as well (eg 06). The first letter indicated the city they were registered from (eg L for Lahore, M for Multan, V for Vehari)
Motorcycles		starting 2022 the new number plate is introduced with new alphabet ALP and four digit is same as previously used.	Plates are white with black letters and numbers, but smaller in dimension. Plates are all white with black letters and numbers. "PUNJAB" is written on the side with a logo of Government of Punjab on the left side and ET&NC. New Punjab Plates have four digit registration numbers for motorcycles. However vehicles registered before August 2020 have four digit numbers on them and they have the issuing year on them as well (eg 06). The first letter indicated the city they were registered from (eg L for Lahore, M for Multan, V for Vehari)
Public transport		CAA 000	Plates are white with black letters. With the first letter being (eg CAA).
Government			Plates are white with black letters. However they have a green strip on them on the top where "PUNJAB" is written.

=== Sindh ===
Sindh vehicle registration plates
Vehicle Type	Image	Example	Description
Cars			Plates are yellow with embossed black letters and numbers. The plates consist of three letters and three numbers with the Sindh coat of arms above. Sindh is written above only. Plates start with alphabets (beginning with AAA) followed by a string of numbers (beginning with 001).
Motorcycles		AAA; 0000	Plates are White with embossed black letters and numbers, but smaller in dimension.
Public transport		KH-5708	Plates are black with white letters and numbers.
Government		AAA·000	Plates are fully green with white letters and numbers embossed. Plates start with alphabets (GS) (GP) (GL) HC for high court (SP) for sindh police followed by a string of numbers.

== See also ==
- Transport in Pakistan
