= Fügen Ok =

Turkish diplomat

Ambassador of Turkey to Denmark
- In office 1 January 2001 – 1 January 2005
- Preceded by: Gün Gör
- Succeeded by: Mehmet Akat

Permanent Representative of Turkey to the United Nations
- In office 1992–1998

Personal details
- Born: Fügen Yücesoy
- Spouse: Nurettin Ok
- Children: 2
- Education: American College for Girls; Ankara University

Fügen Ok (née Yücesoy) is a retired diplomat who served as Turkey's permanent representative to the United Nations in Vienna from 1992 to 1998 and as ambassador of Turkey to Denmark between 2001 and 2005.

== Education ==
She graduated from the American College for Girls, Istanbul, in 1961. She received a degree in political sciences in 1965 from Ankara University.

== Career ==
Following her graduation she was employed at the Ministry of Foreign Affairs. In 1992 Ok was named as the permanent representative to the UN in Vienna. The same year Solmaz Ünaydın was made the ambassador of Turkey to Sweden, and both became the highest-rank women diplomats in Turkey after Filiz Dinçmen. In addition, Turkey's diplomatic mission at the United Nations in Vienna was initiated with the appointment of Fügen Ok on 15 October 1992. Ok remained in the post until 1998.

She was appointed ambassador of Turkey to Denmark on 1 January 2001, replacing Gün Gör in the post. Her term ended on 1 January 2005, and she was replaced by Mehmet Akat in the post. She retired from the diplomatic post in February 2006. She taught at different universities in Ankara.

== Personal life ==
She married Nurettin Ok in 1967. He was a politician and served as the minister of public works. She has two sons from this marriage.
