= Nurettin Ok =

Turkish lawyer, journalist and politician (1927–2013)

Minister of Public Works and Housing
- In office 31 March 1975 – 1977
- Prime Minister: Süleyman Demirel

Minister of Public Works
- In office 1973–1974
- Prime Minister: Naim Talu

Personal details
- Born: 1927 Çankırı, Turkey
- Died: 17 July 2013 (aged 85–86) Ankara, Turkey
- Resting place: Çankırı, Turkey
- Party: Democrat Party; Republican Villagers Nation Party; Justice Party
- Spouse: Fügen Ok
- Children: 2
- Education: Istanbul University

Nurettin Ok (1927–2013) was a Turkish lawyer, journalist and politician who served at the Parliament for five times. He was also a cabinet member in the 1970s.

== Early life and education ==
Ok was born in Çankırı in 1927. He graduated from Kabataş High School, Istanbul, in 1946. He received a degree in law from Istanbul University. He also obtained a master's degree in journalism.

== Career ==
Following his graduation Ok began to work as a lawyer and journalist in his hometown. He was elected as the mayor of Çankırı in 1955, and his term ended shortly after the military coup on 27 May 1960. He won a seat from the Republican Villagers Nation Party representing Çankırı in the general election in 1961. He left the Republican Villagers Nation Party in 1965 becoming a member of the Justice Party. He was also elected as a member of the Parliament in the 1965 elections for the Justice Party.

Ok was appointed minister of public works to the cabinet led by Naim Talu on 15 April 1973. The same year he was again elected as a deputy from Çankırı. Ok was named as the minister of public works and housing on 31 March 1975 to the cabinet led by Prime Minister Süleyman Demirel. Ok was last elected to the Parliament in 1977.

== Personal life and died ==
Ok married Fügen Ok in 1967. He had two sons from this marriage.

Ok died in Ankara on 17 July 2013. Funeral prayers for him were performed in Kocatepe Mosque, Ankara, and he was buried in Çankırı.
