= Yıldız İbrahimova =

Yıldız İbrahimova Йълдъз Ибрахимова
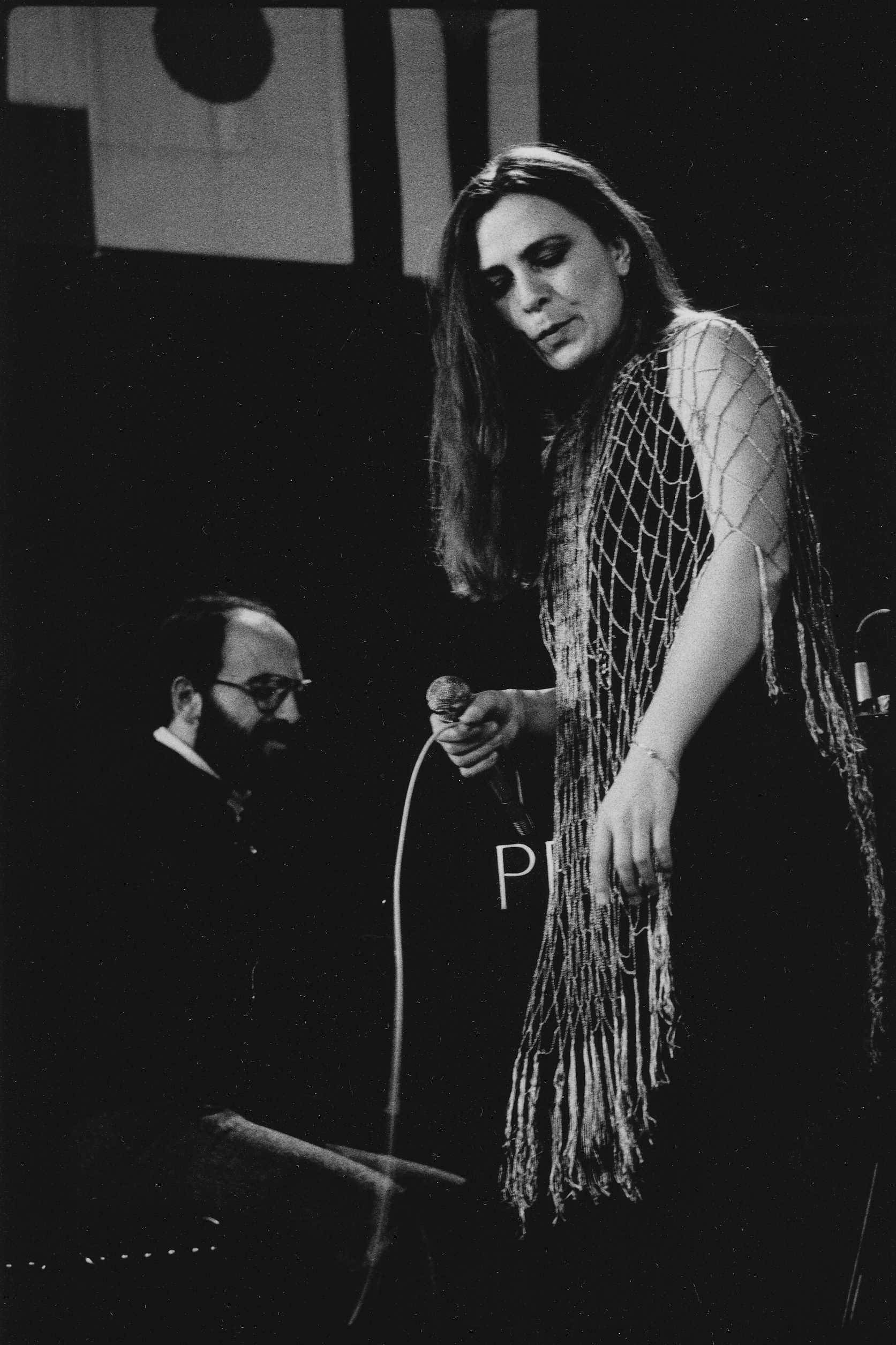

Background information
- Born: April 8, 1952 (age 74)
- Origin: Silistra, Bulgaria
- Genres: Jazz, fusion, folk
- Occupation: Singer

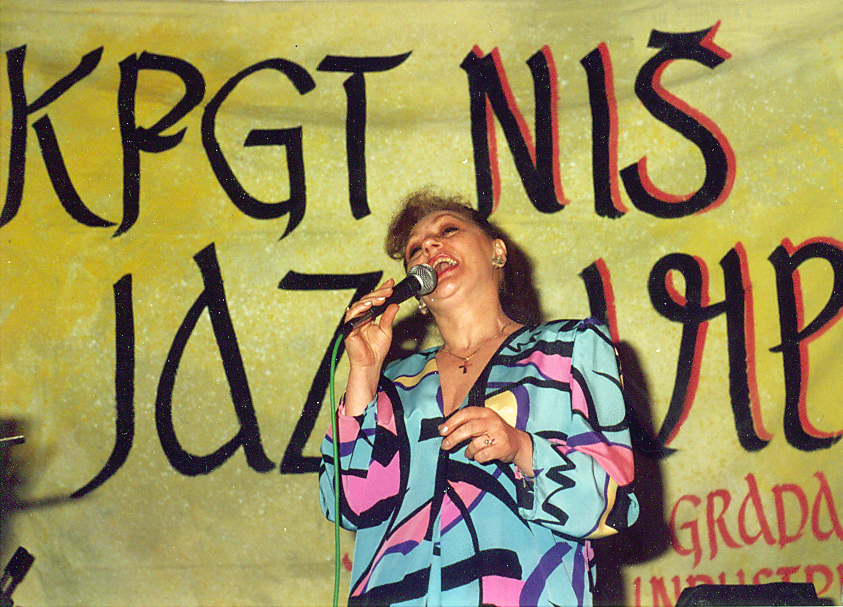
Yıldız İbrahimova performed at the Jazz Festival in Niš, 1996

Yıldız İbrahimova (Bulgarian: Йълдъз Ибрахимова Yǎldǎz Ibrahimova, Turkish: Yıldız İbrahimova; born 1952 in Silistra) is a Bulgarian singer of Turkish ancestry. Besides jazz, she has also recorded Bulgarian, Turkish, Gypsy and Russian folk songs. She married Ali Dinçer, a Turkish politician, also born in Bulgaria and former mayor of Ankara, in 1993. Since then she has lived in Turkey. Her husband died in 2007.

Yildiz Ibrahimova has participated in tours in over 40 countries in Europe, North America, Asia, Australia and Africa.

== Albums ==
Her records include the following albums:

- (1979) Turkish Folk Songs, LP, Balkanton, Sofia-Bulgaria
- (1981) Naissus Jazz-81-LP, Discos, Nish-Serbia
- (1987) Jazz and Something More, LP, Balkanton
- (1987) The Girl with Lovely Eyes, LP, Balkanton
- (1990) Illusory Eternity, LP, Balkanton
- (1991) Paris -Zagreb, with Antoine Herve quintet, CD-DEUX Z, Paris, France
- (1992) Illusory Eternıty, CD, Balkanton
- (1992) Hard way to Freedom -with Anatoly Vapirov - AVA Records, Sofia, Bulgaria
- (1995) Ișığın Sesi (Voice of Rainbow)- Raks Music, Istanbul, Turkey
- (1997) Balkanatolia feat. Ivo Papasov, Raks Music, Istanbul
- (1999) Marcanja e Romeskere Gilya (Songs of the Gypsy), Universal Music Turkey
- (2000) Marcanja-Songs of the Gypsy, Virginia Records-Universal Music Bulgaria
- (2003) Çocukça Șarkılar-Children Songs, Boyut, Istanbul, Turkey
- (2003) Pesni za Malki i Golemi-Children Songs, Virginia Records-Universal Bulgaria
- (2005) 30 Years on Stage, Virginia Records
- (2009) Back to my Love, Virginia Records-Bulgaria
- (2011) Balkanatolia 2 - Annemden Rumeli Türküleri-Kalan-Turkey
