= List of ambassadors of Turkey to the Council of Europe =

The list of ambassadors of Turkey to the Council of Europe includes diplomats responsible for representing Turkey within the Council of Europe (CoE). Turkey established a diplomatic mission in Strasbourg on 1 August 1953 to serve as the permanent representation of Turkey at CoE and as a consulate general for Turkish citizens in Strasbourg. On 2 February 1967, the permanent representation to CoE was separated from the consular section and the first ambassador was appointed as chief of mission.

The current chancery building, located at 23 Boulevard de l’Orangerie, has been operational since 28 April 1966.

== List of consuls general ==
#	Consul General	Term start	Term end	Ref.
1	Affan Akça	22 July 1953	31 October 1955	
2	Mustafa Borovalı	31 October 1955	17 October 1960	
3	Melih Z. Akbil	5 November 1960	30 May 1962	

== List of ambassadors ==
#	Ambassador	Term start	Term end	Ref.
1	Nihat Dinç	30 May 1962	21 September 1967	
2	Efdal Deringil	4 December 1967	31 October 1969	
3	Cahit S. Hayta	20 November 1969	31 December 1971	
4	Rahmi Gümrükçüoğlu	31 December 1971	22 May 1975	
5	Semih Günver	25 May 1975	14 March 1982	
6	Selçuk Korkud	23 March 1982	1 November 1984	
7	Filiz Dinçmen	2 November 1984	31 May 1988	
8	Turhan Fırat	31 May 1988	25 December 1990	
9	Sönmez Köksal	25 December 1990	17 December 1992	
10	İsmet Birsel	31 March 1993	29 September 1996	
11	Rıza Türmen	29 September 1996	18 October 1998	
12	Alev Kılıç	18 October 1998	22 November 2001	
13	Numan Hazar	1 December 2001	21 March 2004	
14	Daryal Batıbay	28 March 2004	16 September 2011	
15	Rauf Engin Soysal	15 November 2011	16 July 2014	
16	Erdoğan Şerif İşcan	28 October 2014	20 November 2018	
17	Kaan Esener	21 November 2018	11 January 2023	
18	Nurdan Bayraktar Golder	11 January 2023	Present	

== See also ==
- Council of Europe
- Ministry of Foreign Affairs
- List of diplomatic missions of Turkey
