= Vedat Dalokay =

Turkish architect and mayor (1927–1991)

Mayor of Ankara
- In office 10 December 1973 – 12 December 1977
- Preceded by: Ekrem Barlas
- Succeeded by: Ali Dinçer

Personal details
- Born: Vedat Ali Dalokay; 10 November 1927 Elazığ, Turkey
- Died: 21 March 1991 (aged 63) Kırıkkale, Turkey
- Party: Republican People's Party; Workers' Party; Unity Party; Socialist Workers' Party; Party of the Socialist Revolution; Populist Party; Party of Social Democracy; Social Democratic Populist Party; People's Labour Party
- Education: Istanbul Technical University
- Occupation: Architect

Vedat Ali Dalokay (10 November 1927 – 21 March 1991) was a Turkish architect and a former mayor of Ankara. He is best known for being the designer of the Faisal Mosque in Islamabad.

== Early life and education ==
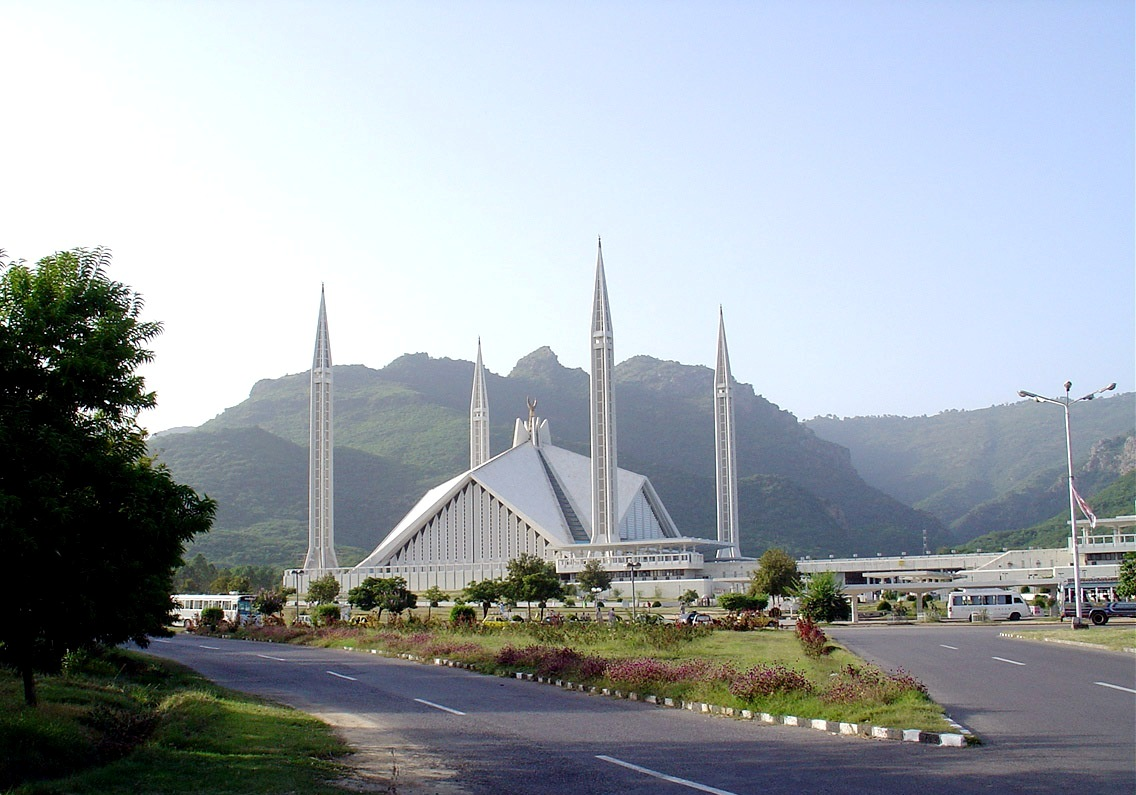
Faisal Masjid in Islamabad, Pakistan

Dalokay was born in Elazığ in 1927 to İbrahim Bey and Emine Hanım, in an Alevi Kurdish family who had relocated from Pertek. He completed his elementary and secondary education in Elazığ. He left for Istanbul for higher education, where he attended and graduated from the Istanbul Technical University Faculty of Architecture in 1949. His lecturers were Clemens Holzmeister and Paul Bonatz. Following his graduation in 1949, he entered the Ministry of Works and the Post and Telecommunications Department. In 1950, he settled in Paris to begin postgraduate studies at the City Planning Department of Sorbonne University in Paris, France, but did not graduate.

== Career ==
In the 1973 Turkish local elections, he was elected mayor of Ankara from the Republican People's Party (CHP). In 1975, Dalokay requested assistance from the Soviet Union to build a public transportation system and affordable housing in Ankara. In 1977 Dalokay and other CHP mayors, including İstanbul mayor Ahmet İsvan and İzmit mayor Erol Köse issued a declaration on social municipalism.

Dalokay served as mayor of Ankara until the 1977 Turkish local elections and was replaced by another CHP member, Ali Dinçer, in the post.

== Awards and work ==
Along with numerous national award-winning projects in Turkey, Dalokay has been awarded internationally for the Islamic Development Bank (1981) in Riyadh, Saudi Arabia.

His design for the Kocatepe Mosque in the Turkish capital, Ankara was selected in the architectural competition in 1957 but, as a result of criticism, was not built. Later, a modified design was used as a basis for the Faisal Mosque in Islamabad, Pakistan. In Pakistan, he was also the architect of two not realized buildings, then of the constricted monument Summit Minar, Lahore and is considered a major Turkish influence in Pakistani architecture.

== Death ==
Vedat Dalokay passed away along with his wife Ayçe Dalokay (aged 64) in a traffic accident near Kırıkkale on 21 March 1991. His son Barış Dalokay (aged 17), who was injured in the accident, also died on 27 March 1991.

== See also ==
- List of Turkish architects

== Sources ==
- Drawings and model photos of Vedat Dalokay's unbuilt mosque design for the Kocatepe Mosque
- Animation of Vedat Dalokay's unbuilt mosque design for the Kocatepe Mosque
- As, Imdat "The Kocatepe Mosque Experience, " in Emergent Design: Rethinking Contemporary Mosque Architecture in Light of Digital Technology, S.M.Arch.S. Thesis, Massachusetts Institute of Technology, Cambridge, MA, 2002. pp.24-46

Political offices
Preceded by Ekrem Barlas	Mayor of Ankara; 1973–1977	Succeeded by Ali Dinçer
