= Ali Dinçer =

Turkish politician

Mayor of Ankara
- In office 11 December 1977 – 12 September 1980
- Preceded by: Vedat Dalokay
- Succeeded by: Süleyman Önder

Minister of State
- In office 30 October 1995 – 6 March 1996
- Prime Minister: Tansu Çiller

Personal details
- Born: 1945 Razgrad, Bulgaria
- Died: 18 April 2007 (aged 61–62) Ankara
- Education: Middle East Technical University
- Occupation: Politician
- Profession: Engineer

Ali Dinçer (1945 – 18 April 2007) was a Turkish mechanical engineer, politician, former mayor of Ankara and former government minister.

Ali Dinçer was born in Razgrad, Bulgaria to a family of Turkish ancestry in 1945. While he was four years old, his family moved to Turkey. After completing Yıldırım Bayezıd High School and the Mechanical Engineering School of the Middle East Technical University, he obtained a Master's degree in Industrial Engineering. During his professional career, he was elected as the speaker of the Union of Chambers of Turkish Engineers and Architects.

Ali Dinçer married to Yıldız İbrahimova, a Bulgarian singer of Turkish ancestry.

== Political career ==
In the university, he was a member of the Social Democracy Association. He joined the Republican People's Party (CHP), and in the local elections held on 11 December 1977, he was elected as the Mayor of Ankara. His term was cut short by the 1980 Turkish coup d'état. In 1995, he returned to politics. On 24 December 1995, he was elected into the 20th Parliament of Turkey as a deputy of Ankara. In the short-lived 52nd government of Turkey, he was appointed Minister of State serving between 30 October 1995 and 6 March 1996. The CHP failed to enter the parliament in the next general election held on 18 April 1999. In the general election held on 3 November 2002, he was elected as a deputy of Bursa into the 22nd Parliament.

Ali Dinçer died in Ankara on 18 April 2007 due to liver cancer.

== Legacy ==
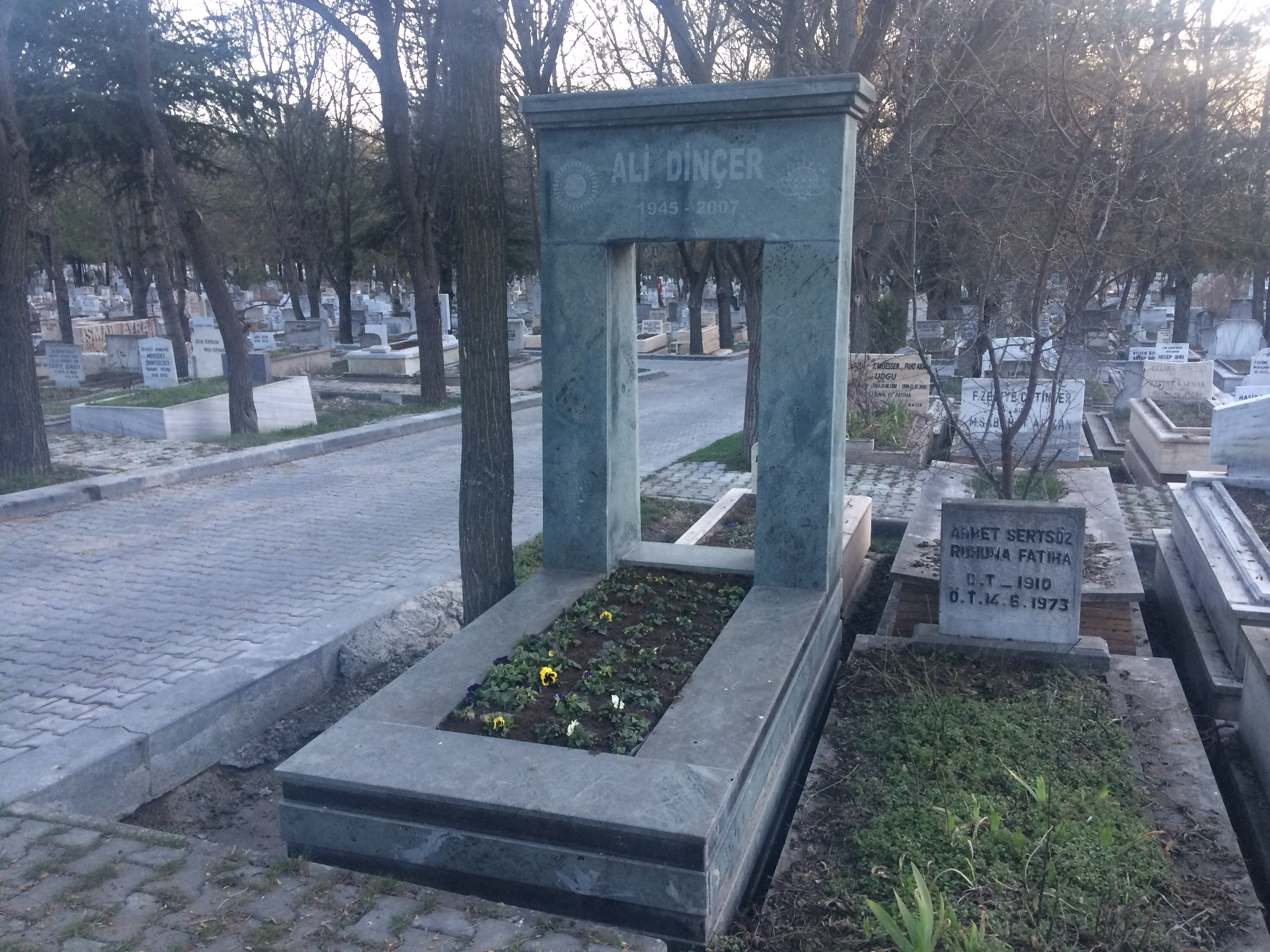
Grave of Ali Dinçer at Karşıyaka Cemetery.

A 68,000 m^{2} (730,000 sq ft) covering urban park in Yenimahalle secondary municipality of Ankara, which was opened to public on 29 September 2007, is named after Ali Dinçer.

Political offices
| Preceded by Vedat Dalokay | Mayor of Ankara; 1977–1980 | Succeeded by Süleyman Önder |
