= Kocatepe Mosque =

Mosque in Ankara, Turkey

- Kocatepe Camii ve Külliyesi
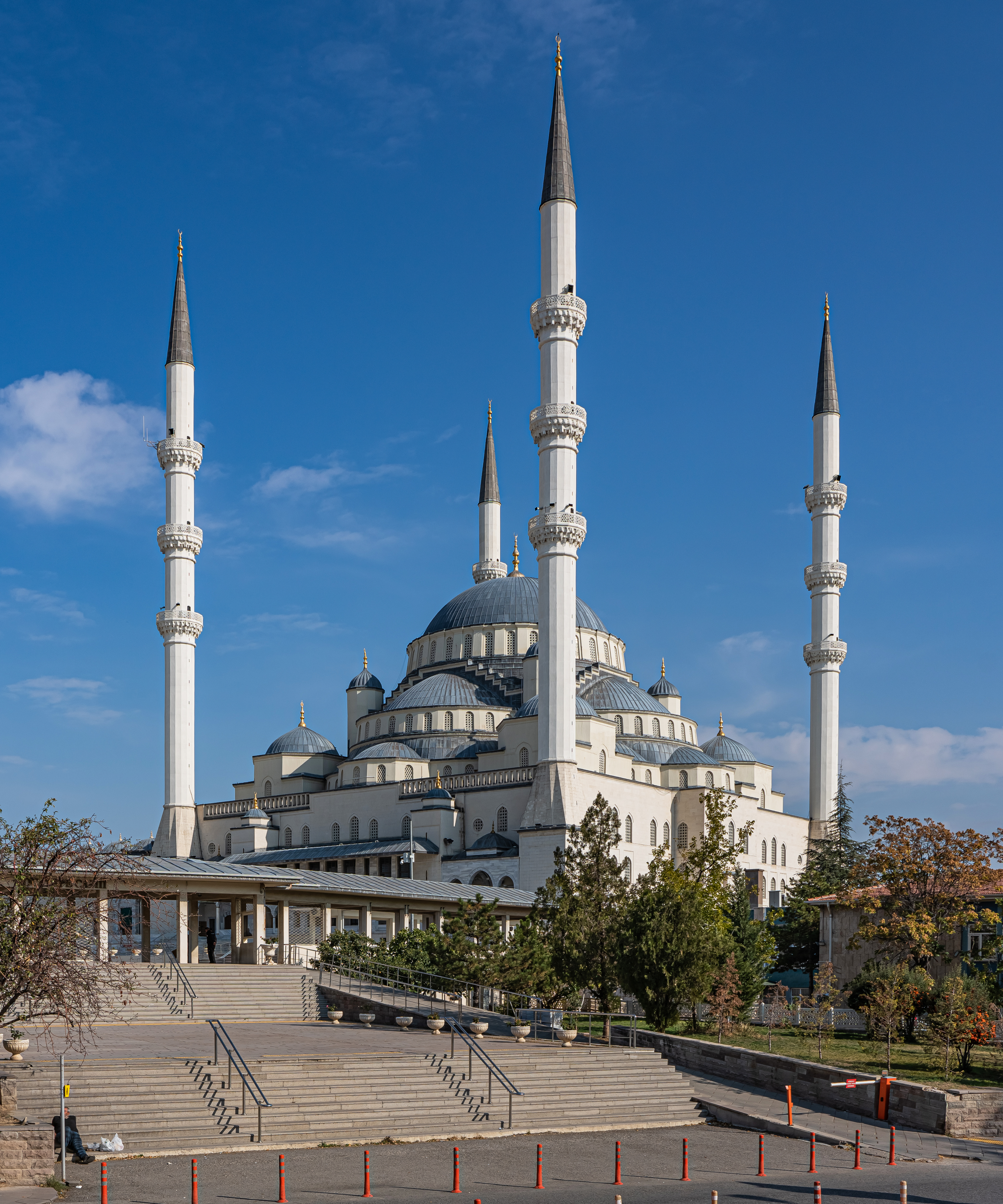

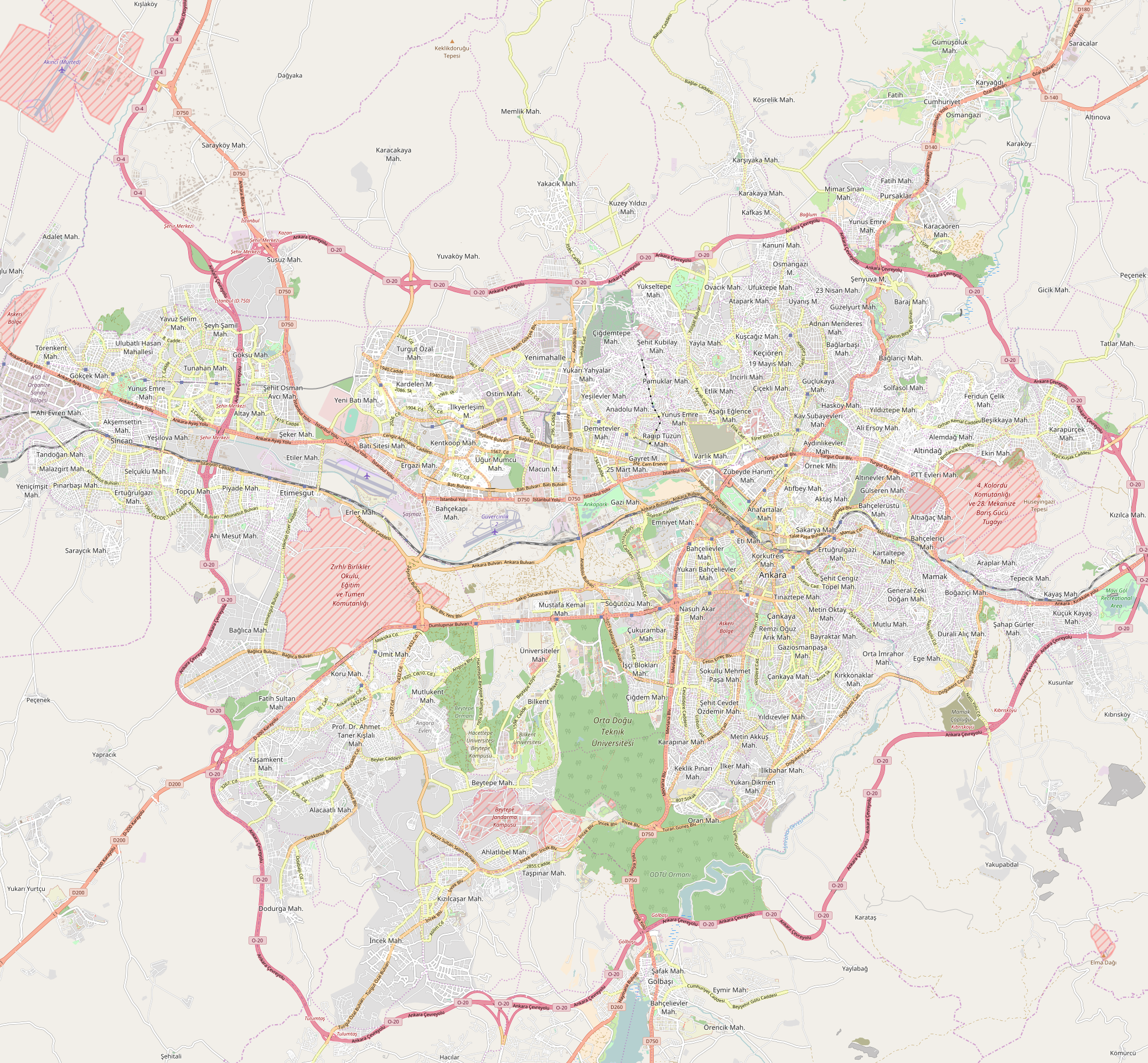
- Location within Ankara Location within Turkey

Religion
- Affiliation: Islam
- Leadership: Imam(s): Mehmet Atıcı

Location
- Location: Ankara, Turkey
- Administration: Turkish government
- Coordinates: 39°55′00″N 32°51′39″E

Architecture
- Type: Mosque
- Established: Islamic era

Specifications
- Capacity: 24,000 worshippers
- Length: 67 m (220 ft)
- Width: 64 m (210 ft)
- Minaret: 4
- Minaret height: 88 m (289 ft)

Website
- www.ankara.bel.tr

The Kocatepe Mosque (Turkish: Kocatepe Camii) is the largest mosque in Ankara, Turkey. It was built between 1967 and 1987 in the Kocatepe quarter in Kızılay, and its size and prominent situation have made it a landmark that can be seen from almost anywhere in central Ankara.

== History ==
The idea of building the Kocatepe Mosque dates back to the 1940s. On December 8, 1944, Ahmet Hamdi Akseki, the vice-president of Turkish Religious Affairs, along with seventy-two founding members, established a society known as the "Society to Build a Mosque in Yenişehir, Ankara." In 1947 this society called for projects to be drawn up by architects, but none of the submitted projects was accepted. In 1956, through the efforts of the late Adnan Menderes, Prime Minister of the time, land was allocated for the project to build a mosque in Ankara, and a request for projects was made once again in 1957. This time thirty-six projects were evaluated, with the joint project of Vedat Dalokay and Nejat Tekelioğlu being chosen as the one to be implemented.

== Architecture ==
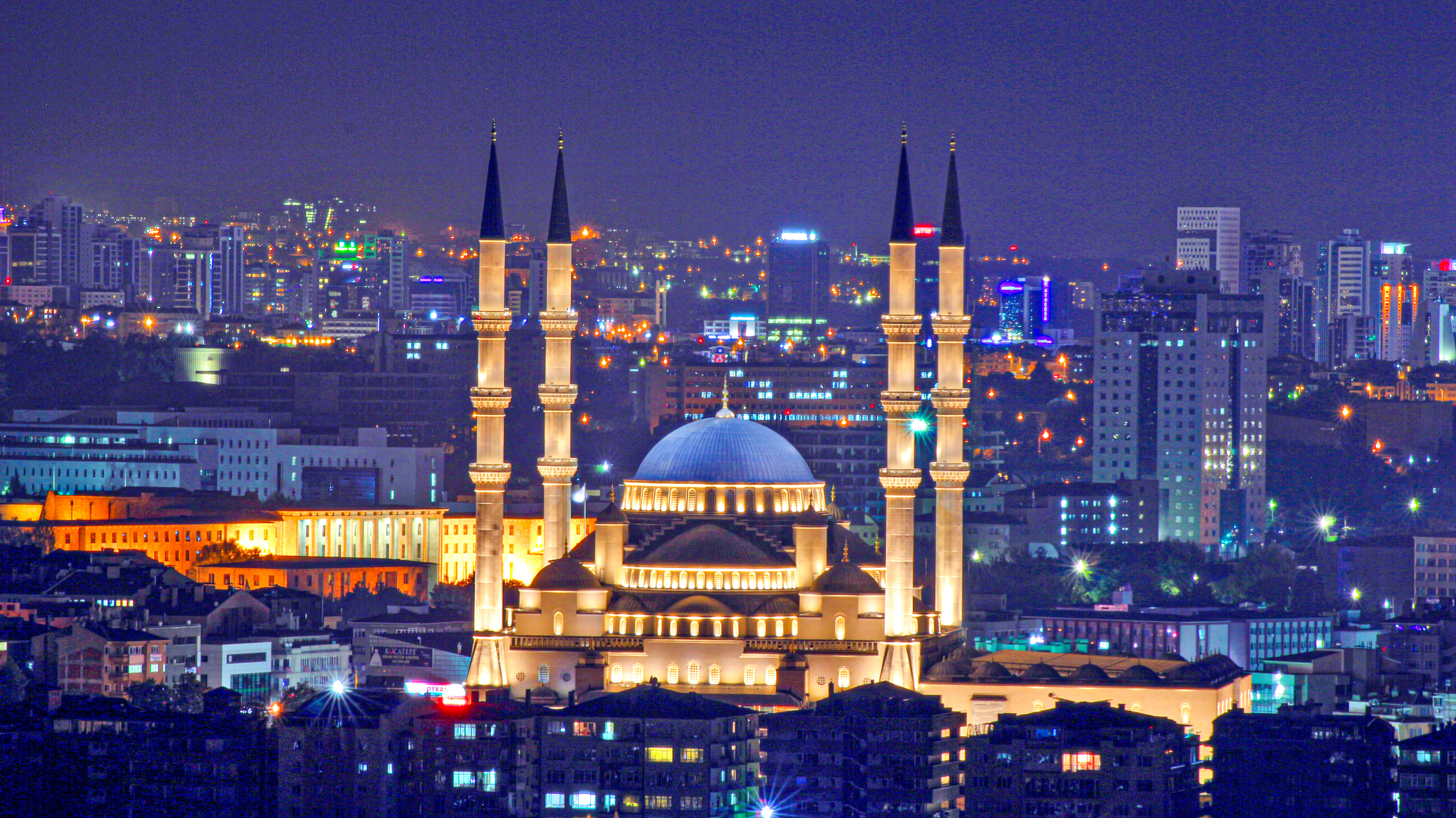
Nighttime view of the mosque

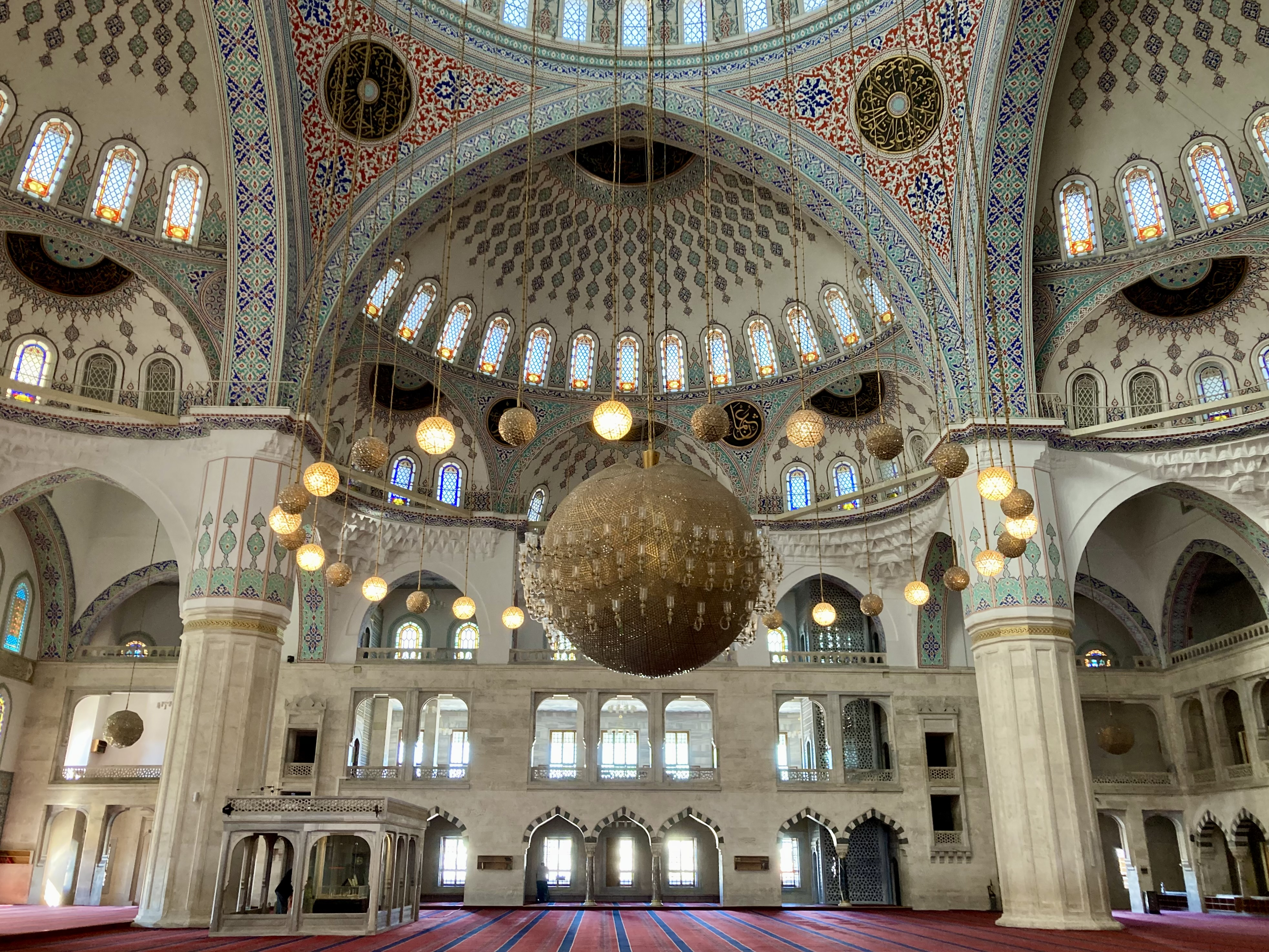
Interior of the mosque

The accepted project was an innovative and modern design. The construction started, but due to heavy critique from conservatives for its modernist look, the construction was stopped at the foundation level. Vedat Dalokay later built a modified version of the Kocatepe Mosque after winning an international competition for the Shah Faisal Mosque in Islamabad, Pakistan in 1969. This mosque, which can accommodate 24,000 worshippers, is one of the largest mosques in the world, and accepted by many as the frontiers of modern Islamic architecture.

After a third architectural competition in 1967, a more conservative design by Hüsrev Tayla and M. Fatin Uluengin was chosen. It was completed in 1987, and was built in a neo-classical Ottoman architecture style. It was inspired by the Selimiye Mosque in Edirne, as well as the Shehzade and Sultan Ahmet mosques in Istanbul, which in turn, were influenced by the Eastern Roman architecture of the Hagia Sophia.
