= Filiz Dinçmen =

Turkish diplomat

Turkish Ambassador to the Netherlands
- In office 1982–1984

Turkish Ambassador to Council of Europe
- In office 1984–1988

Turkish Ambassador to Austria
- In office 1993–1997

Turkish Ambassador to Vatican
- In office 2002–2004

Turkish Ambassador to Malta
- In office 2002–2004

Personal details
- Born: July 24, 1939 (age 87) Zonguldak, Turkey
- Citizenship: Turkish
- Spouse: Üstün Dinçmen
- Education: Faculty of Political Science, Ankara University
- Profession: Diplomat

Filiz Dinçmen (born July 24, 1939, in Zonguldak, Turkey ) is a former Turkish diplomat, who became the first female Turkish ambassador to a foreign country.

== Education ==
Dinçmen completed her high school education at Ankara Highschool for Girls in 1956. She studied at the Faculty of Political Science, Ankara University between 1956 and 1960 earning a Bachelor of Arts degree.

== Career ==
Dinçmen served in the Ministry of Foreign Affairs of Turkey. Between 1961 and 1965, she held the positions of candidate foreign service officer, third and second secretary within the Department of the United Nations. Between August 1965 and January 1968, she served within the United Nations at the New York City Permanent Mission as second and first secretary.

In 1968, Dinçmen served at the Tehran Embassy, where she occupied the post of first secretary until 1970. In July of that same year, she occupied the post of first secretary, chief of section, within the Department of Bilateral Economic Relations, following which she was appointed chief of section of the Economic Co-operation Group until 1972.

Between 1972 and 1976, Dinçmen served as first secretary and counselor at the Permanent Mission to the Common Market. She was head of the Department of Political Affairs between 1976 and 1980.

In September 1980, she was appointed acting director-general and then director general within the Directorate-General of Multilateral Political Affairs, where she served until 1982. Between September 1982 and November 1984, she served as Ambassador of Turkey at The Embassy of the Hague. She became the first Turkish female Ambassador to a foreign country. After this, she was appointed Ambassador to the Permanent Mission to the Council of Europe in Strasbourg until 1988.

Between 1988 and 1991, Dinçmen worked at the Directorate-General for Multilateral Political Affairs as ambassador, director-general and deputy under-secretary. In 1991, she served as spokeswoman for the Ministry of Foreign Affairs of Turkey, which post she occupied until April 1993.

Filiz Dinçmen was then appointed Ambassador of Turkey to Austria, where she served at the Embassy of Vienna until 1997. Dinçmen was a member of the Foreign Policy Consultative Council and adviser to the speaker of the Turkish Grand National Assembly.

In 2001, Dinçmen was appointed Ambassador to Vatican City State and Malta, where she served until 2004. Upon her return to home country, she retired due to age limit. Currently, she is a member of the Board of Ethic of Civil Servants.
