= Faisal Mosque =

World's sixth-largest mosque in Islamabad, Pakistan

- فیصل مسجد
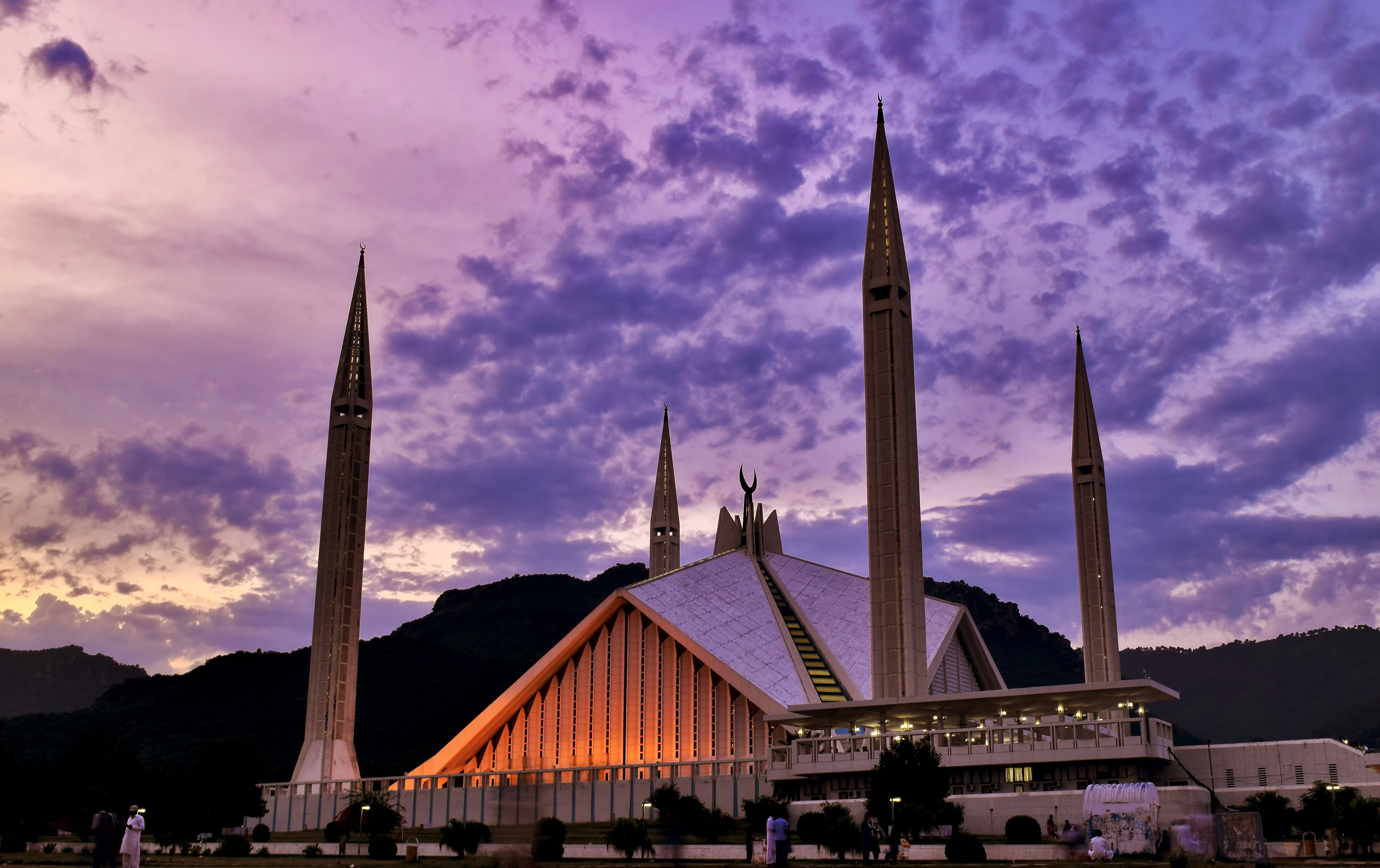

Religion
- Affiliation: Islam

Location
- Location: Islamabad
- Municipality: Capital Development Authority
- Country: Pakistan
- Interactive map of Faisal Mosque
- Administration: International Islamic University, Islamabad
- Coordinates: 33°43′47″N 73°2′14″E

Architecture
- Architect: Vedat Dalokay
- Type: Mosque
- Style: Modern Islamic
- Established: 1986
- Construction cost: US$120 million

Specifications
- Capacity: 300,000 worshippers
- Minaret: 4
- Minaret height: 90 m (300 ft)
- Site area: 130,000 m^{2}; 1,400,000 ft^{2}

The Faisal Mosque (Note: Urdu: فیصل مسجد, romanized: faisal masjid) is the national mosque of Pakistan, located in Islamabad, the capital of the country. It is the sixth-largest mosque in the world and located on the foothills of Margalla Hills. It is named after the late King Faisal of Saudi Arabia (r. 1964–75). Designed by Turkish architect Vedat Dalokay, the mosque features a contemporary design consisting of eight sides of concrete shell and is inspired by the design of a typical Bedouin tent.

A major tourist attraction in Pakistan, the mosque is a contemporary and influential piece of Islamic architecture. Famous spots including the mosque as a masterpiece of modern Islamic architecture, and the Pakistan Monument, which represents the country’s cultural history, add to the city’s charm.

Construction of the mosque began in 1976 after a $28 million grant from Saudi King Faisal, whose name the mosque bears. The unconventional design by Turkish architect Vedat Dalokay was selected after an international competition. Without a typical dome, the mosque is shaped like a Bedouin tent, surrounded by four 90 m (300 ft)-tall minarets. The design features eight-sided shell shaped sloping roofs forming a triangular worship hall which can hold 10,000 worshippers.

Combined the structure covers an area of 130,000 square metres (33 acres), the mosque dominates the landscape of Islamabad. It is situated at the north end of Faisal Avenue, putting it at the northernmost end of the city and at the foot of Margalla Hills, the westernmost foothills of the Himalayas. It is located on an elevated area of land against a picturesque backdrop of the national park. Faisal Mosque was the largest mosque in the world from 1986 until 1993 when it was overtaken by the mosques in Saudi Arabia. It is now the sixth-largest mosque in the world in terms of capacity.

== History ==
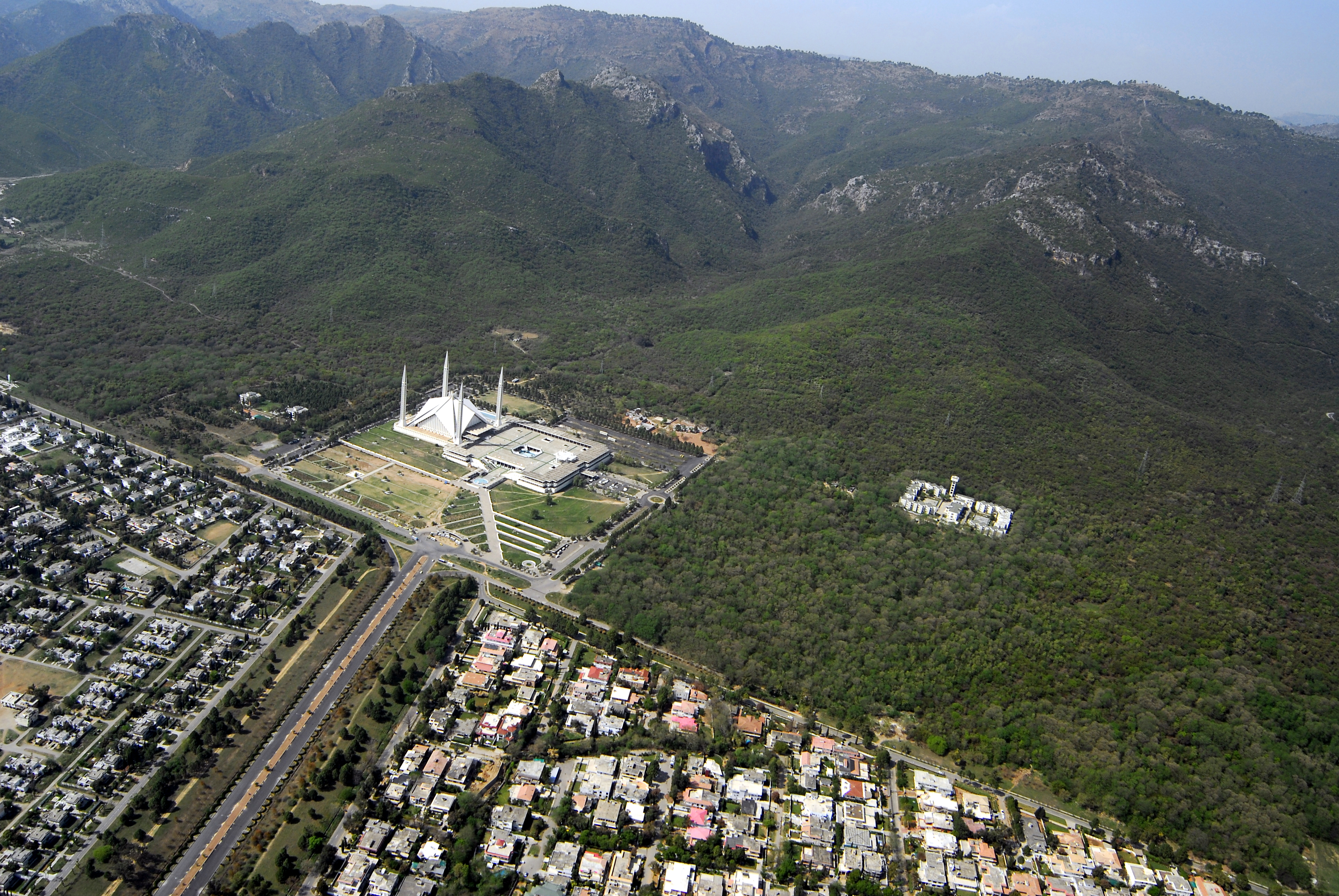
Aerial view

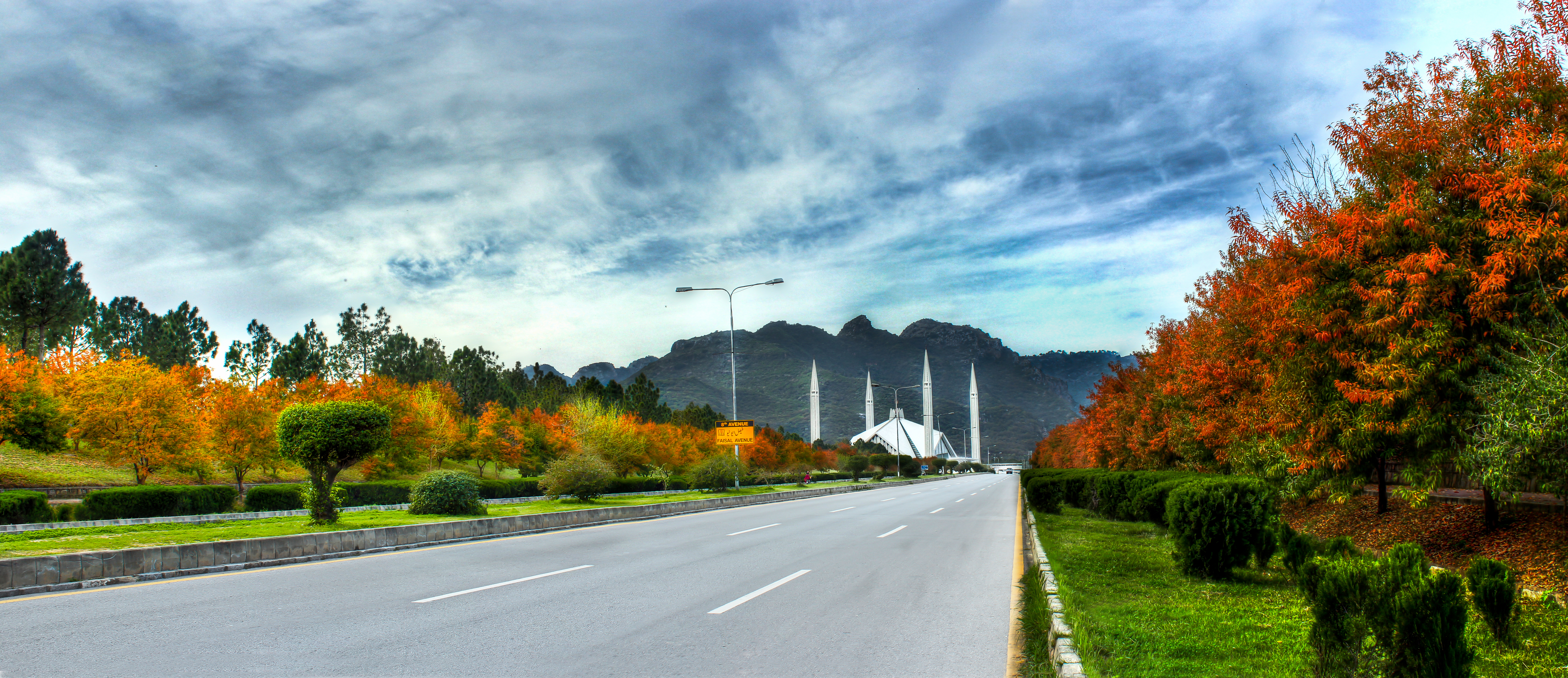
View from Faisal Avenue in Islamabad

The impetus for the mosque began in 1966 when King Faisal bin Abdul-Aziz supported the initiative of the Pakistani Government to build a national mosque in Islamabad during an official visit to Pakistan. In 1969, an international competition was held in which architects from 17 countries submitted 43 proposals. The winning design was that of Turkish architect Vedat Dalokay. 190,000 m^{2}; 2,000,000 ft^{2} of land were assigned for the project and the execution was assigned to Pakistani engineers and workers. Construction of the mosque began in 1976 by National Construction Limited of Pakistan, led by Azim Khan and was funded by the government of Saudi Arabia, at a cost of over 130 million Saudi riyals (approximately 120 million USD today). King Faisal bin Abdul Aziz was instrumental in the funding, and both the mosque and the road leading to it were named after him after his assassination in 1975. King Faisal bin Abdulaziz's successor King Khalid laid the foundation stone for the mosque in October 1976 and signed the construction agreement in 1978. Basic information about the mosque can be found written on the foundation stone. On 18 June 1988, the first prayer was held, although the mosque was completed in 1986. The mosque grounds along with being a building for prayer also used to house the International Islamic University some years ago but has since relocated to a new campus in 2000. Some traditional and conservative Muslims criticised the design at first for its unconventional design and lack of a traditional dome structure.

== Capacity ==
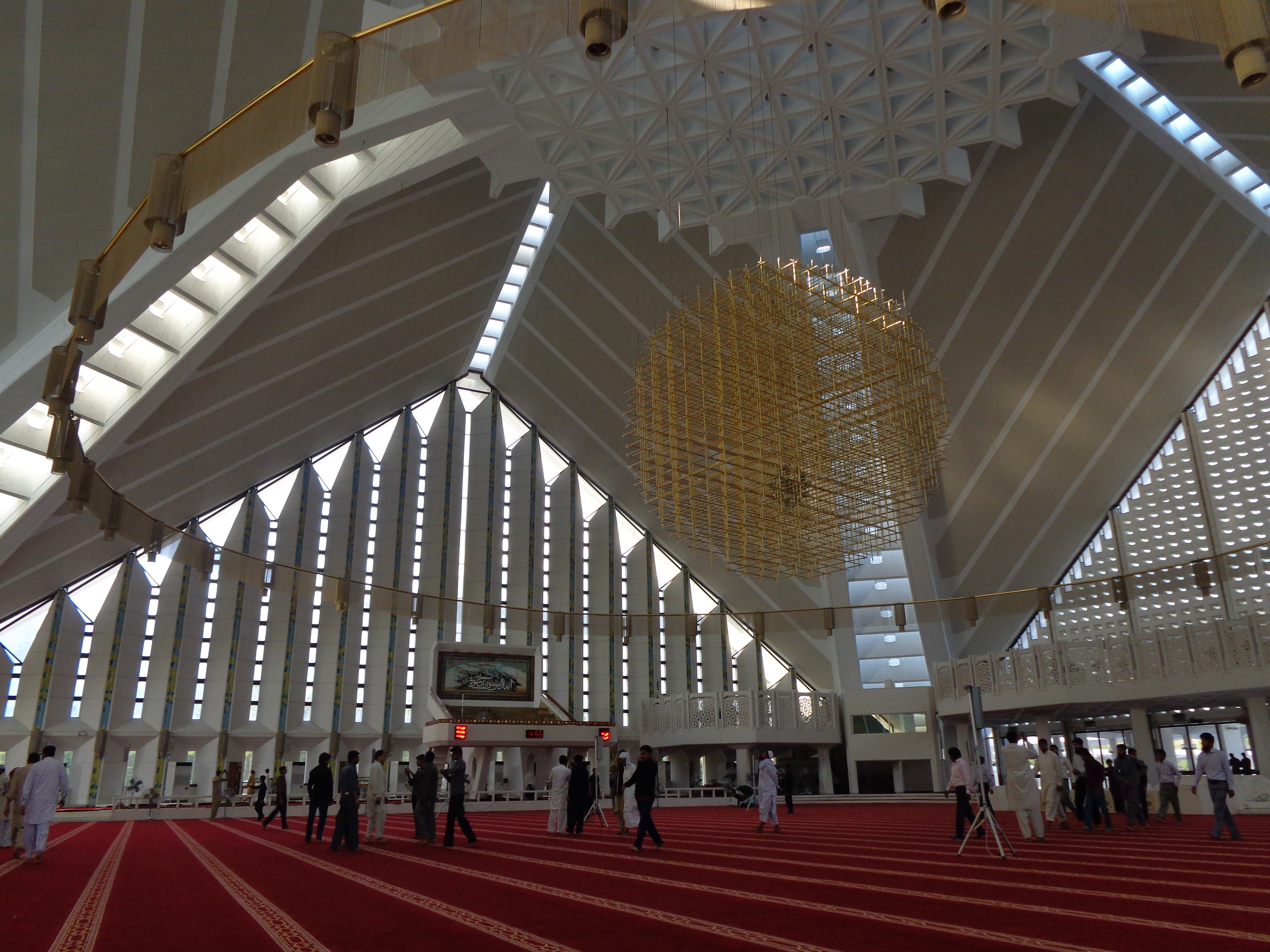
Interior view

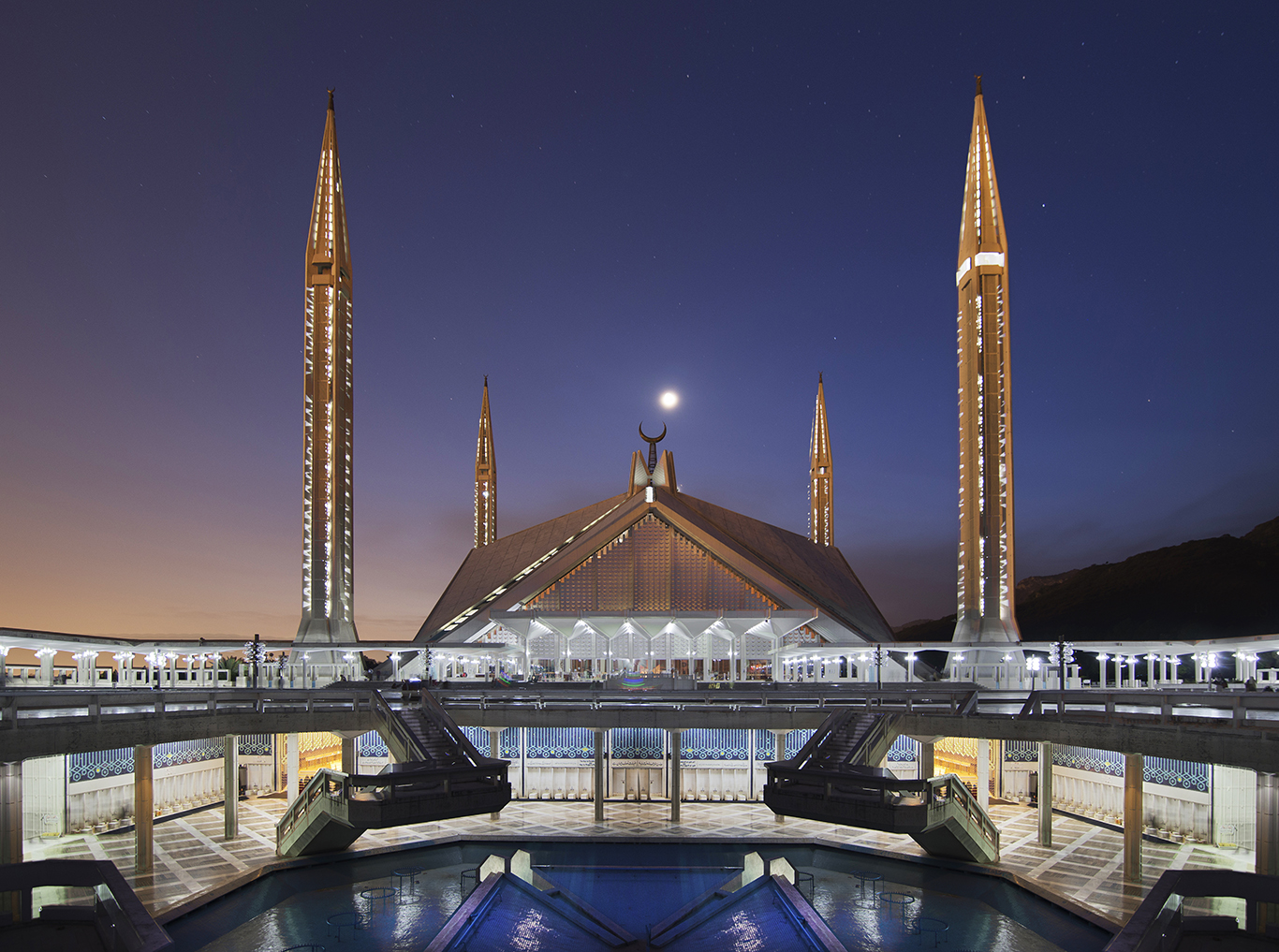

The mosque can accommodate about 300,000 worshippers. Each of the Mosque's four minarets are 90 metres (300 ft) high (the tallest minarets in South Asia) and measure 10×10 metres in circumference. The main areas have the capacity to hold up to 74000 people in the main areas including the inner hall, and the courtyards. The grounds around the mosque have the capacity to contain up to 200,000 people.

== Architecture ==
I tried to capture the spirit, proportion, and geometry of Kaaba in a purely abstract manner. Imagine the apex of each of the four minarets as a scaled explosion of four highest corners of Kaaba – thus an unseen Kaaba form is bounded by the minarets at the four corners in a proportion of height to base. Shah Faisal Mosque is akin to the Holy Kaaba in the designer's imaginative eyes. Now, if you join the apex of each minaret to the base of the minaret diagonally opposite to it correspondingly, a four-sided pyramid shall be bound by these lines at the base side within that invisible cube. That lower level pyramid is treated as a solid body while four minarets with their apex complete the imaginary cube of Kaaba.

— Vedat Dalokay, "Dalokay further explaining the thinking behind the design of the Masjid to students of a design school."

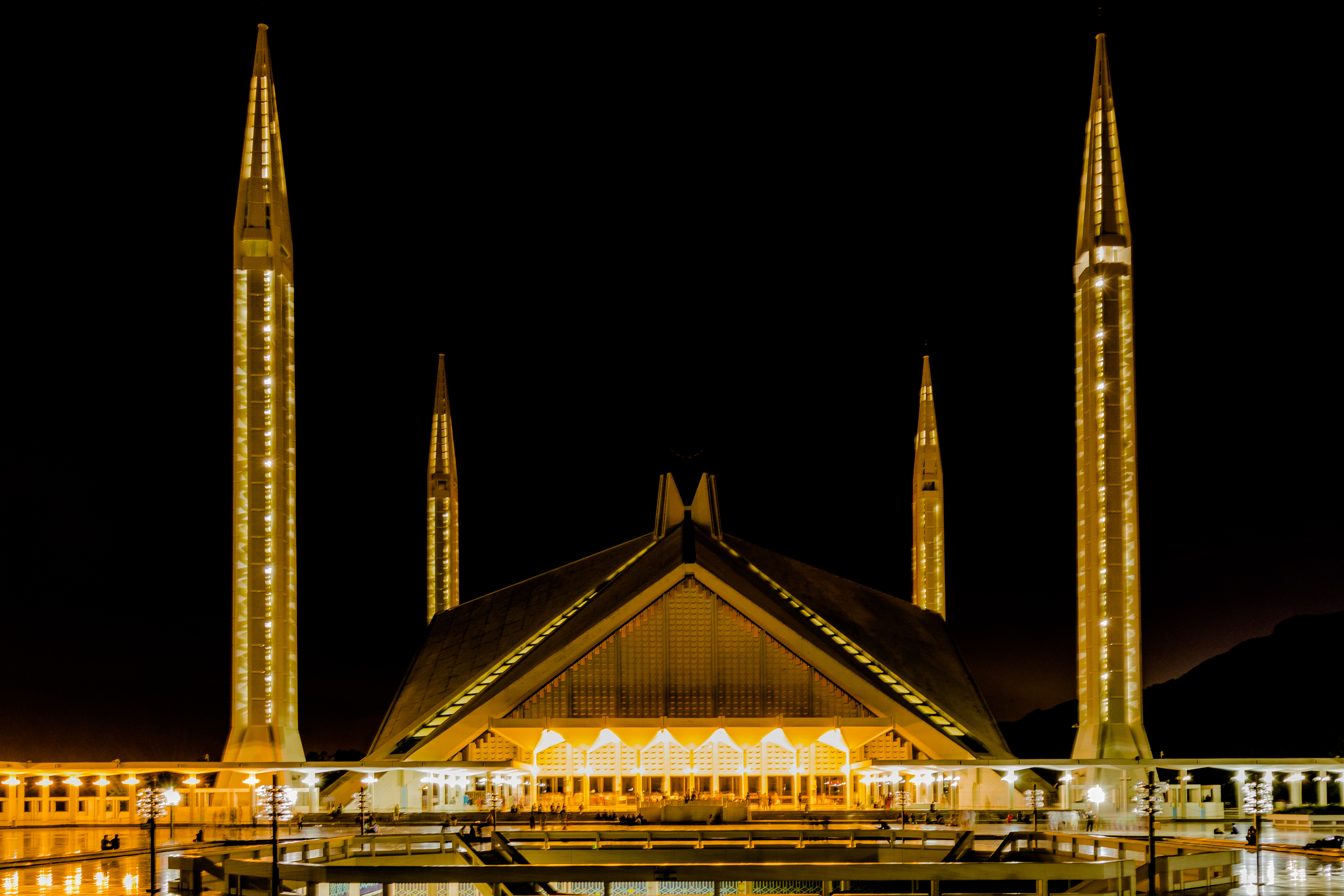
Faisal Mosque close-up view during night

Instead of using traditional domes, Vedat Dalokay designed an eight-sided main hall that looked like an Arab's Bedouin desert tent. Additionally, he added four minarets on all four corners of the main hall, which are of 90 m (300 ft) high, the tallest minarets in South Asia. The main structure of the building is the main prayer hall, which is supported by four concrete girders. The four unusual minarets are inspired by Turkish architecture. Dalokay also believed that the design of the Masjid represents Kaaba in an abstract manner. Entrance is from the east, where the prayer hall is fronted by a courtyard with porticoes. The International Islamic University was housed under the main courtyard but now has relocated to a new campus. The mosque still houses a library, lecture hall, museum, and cafe. The interior of the main tent-shaped hall is covered in white marble and decorated with mosaics and calligraphy by the famous Pakistani artist Sadequain, and a Turkish-style chandelier. The mosaic pattern adorns the west wall and has the Kalimah written in early Kufic script, repeated in mirror image pattern.

The Qibla Wall is covered with blue and white calligraphic tiles designed by a Turkish artist Mengu Ertel. The interior of the mosque uses Turkish and Pakistani inspired decorations. The mosque takes an unusual route to its design by combining contemporary and classic Islamic architecture. The unique design takes most of its elements from nomadic Bedouin tent, but it still manages to keep in contact with Islamic architecture by using Ottoman style minarets and square shape form the Kaaba.

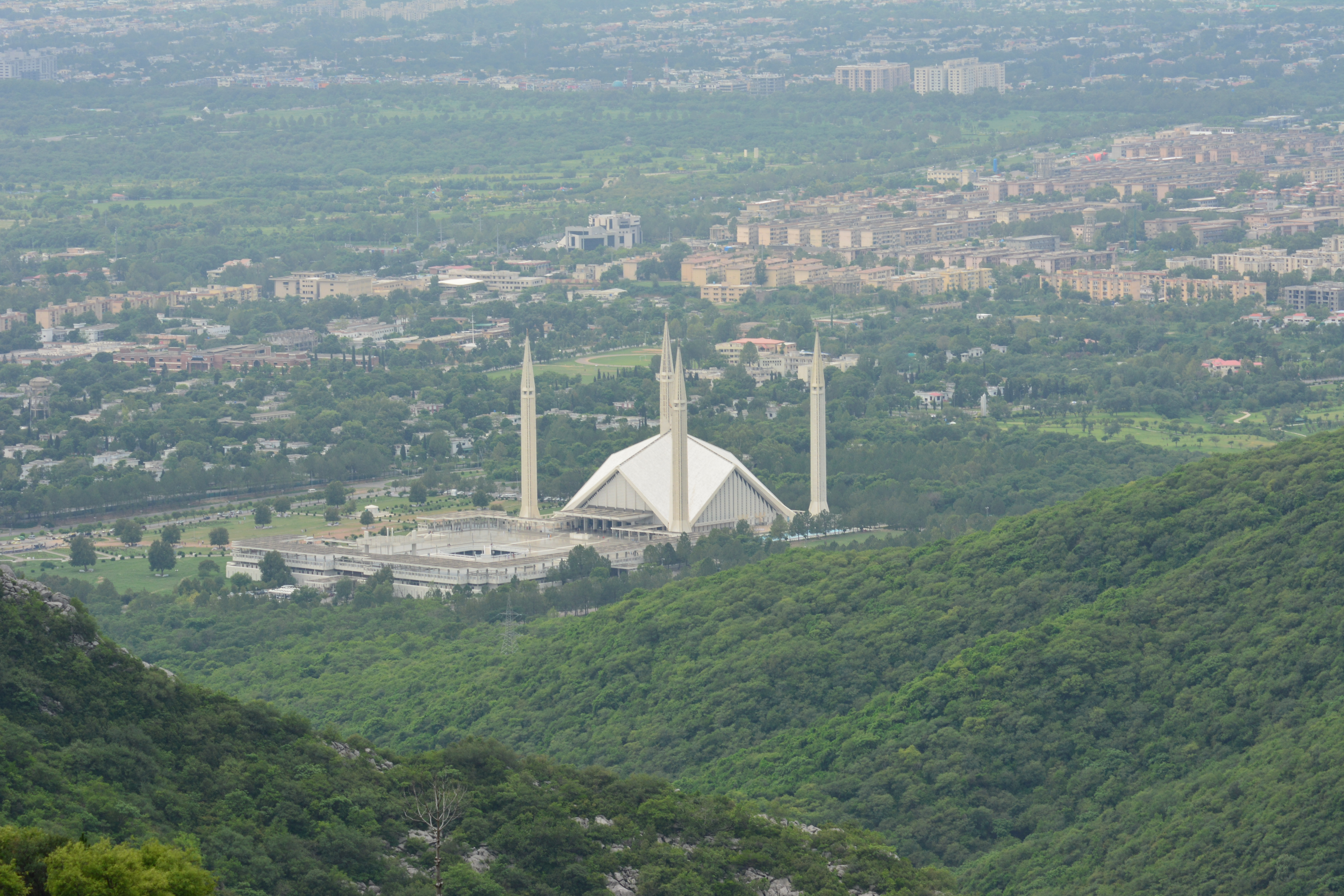
Faisal Mosque from the Margalla Hills

== Topography ==
Located at the foot of the Margalla Hills, the location plays a significant role for the mosque. The mosque is visible from miles away and sits on a higher surface compared to the main city. It faces the city and is backed by green mountain ranges, giving it a scenic view. One of the main highways of Islamabad, Faisal Avenue leads straight to the mosque showing the importance of the landmark. The shining white color in comparison to the dark green background makes the mosque stand out and reveals its significance to the city of Islamabad.

== References in literature ==
The Faisal Mosque is described in the book The Kite Runner by Khalid Hosseini. It is frequently referenced in the work of Michael Muhammad Knight, who came to the mosque to study Islam as a teenager.

== Gallery ==
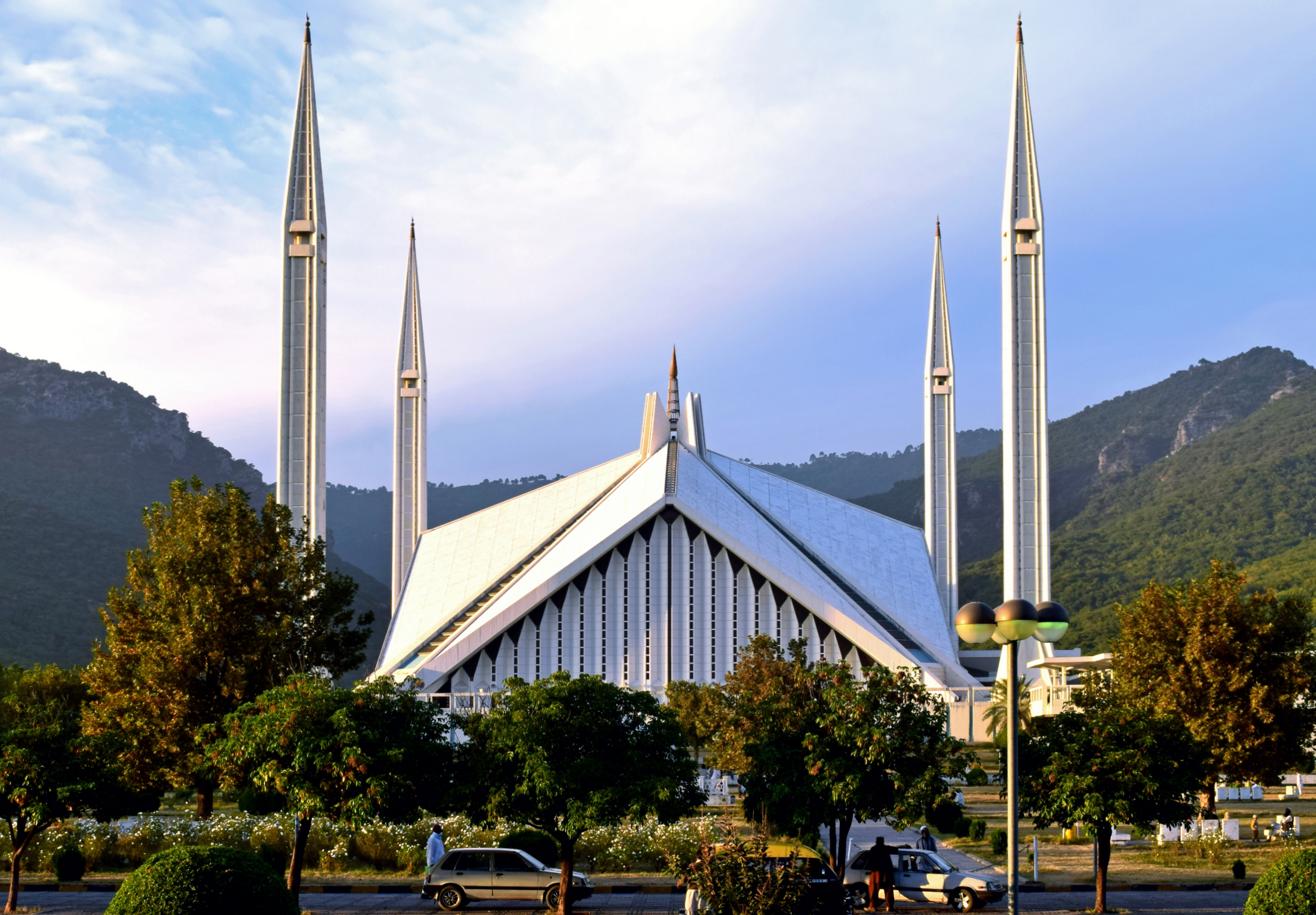
Front view

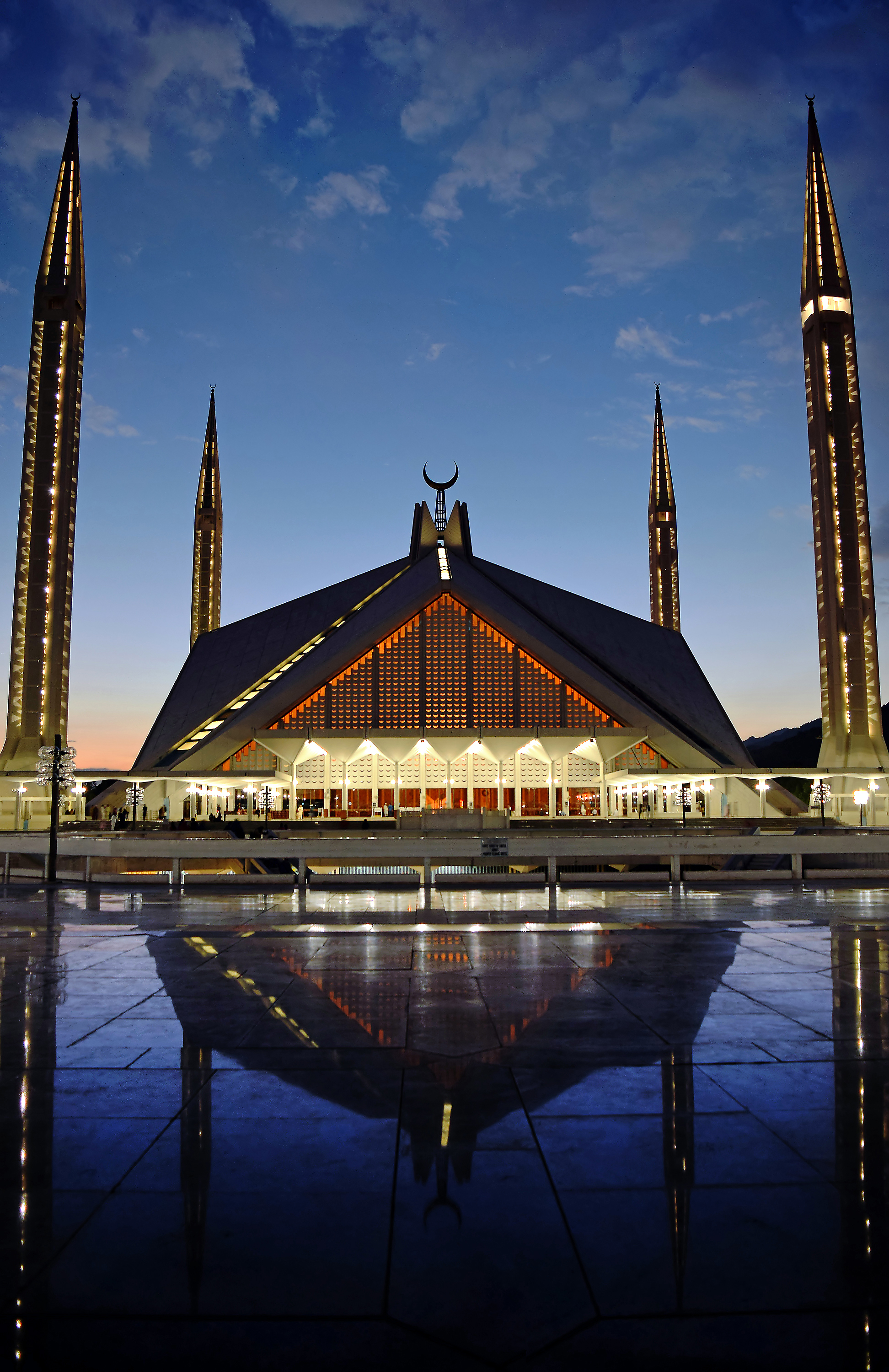
Portrait

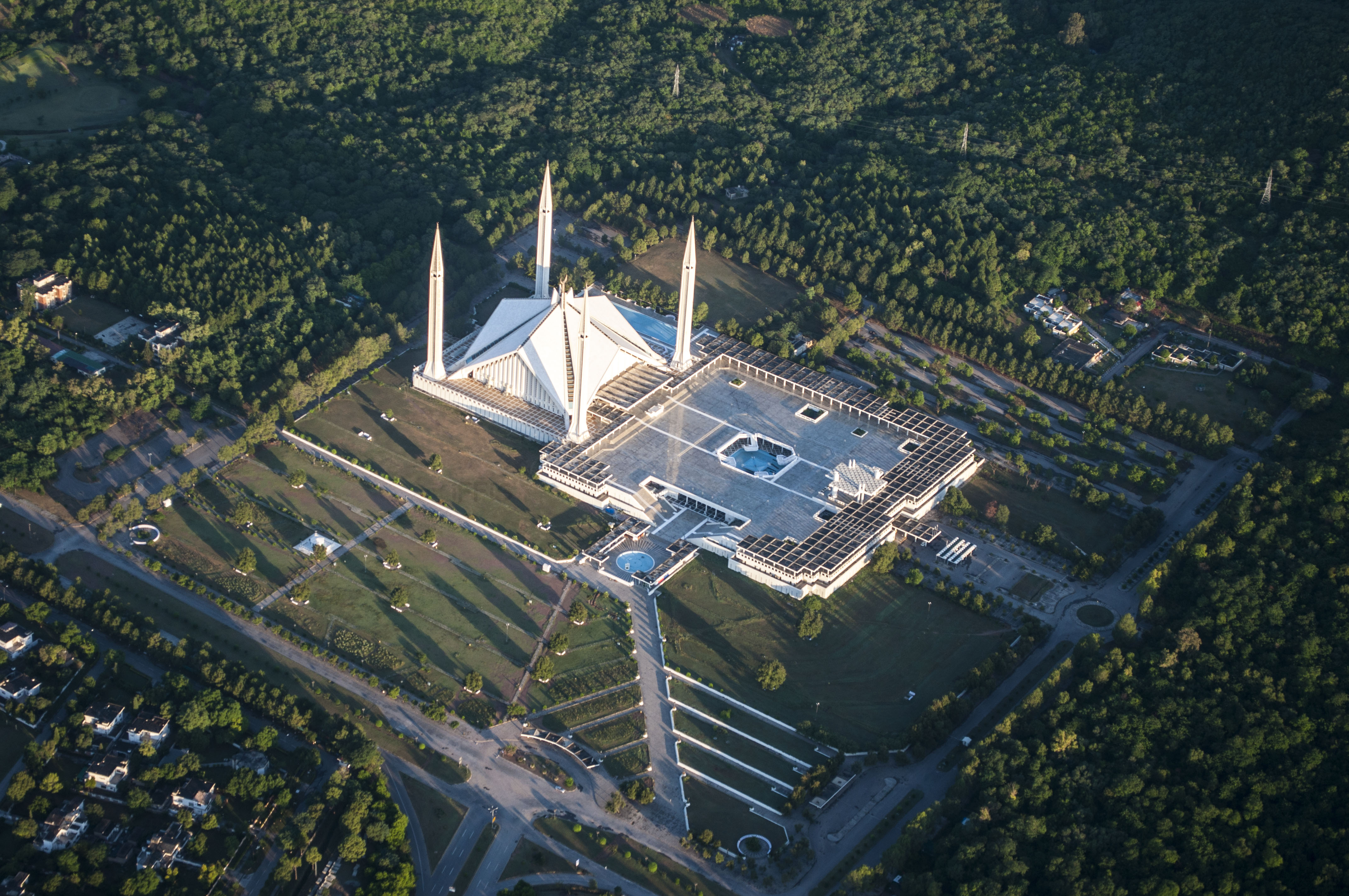
Aerial view

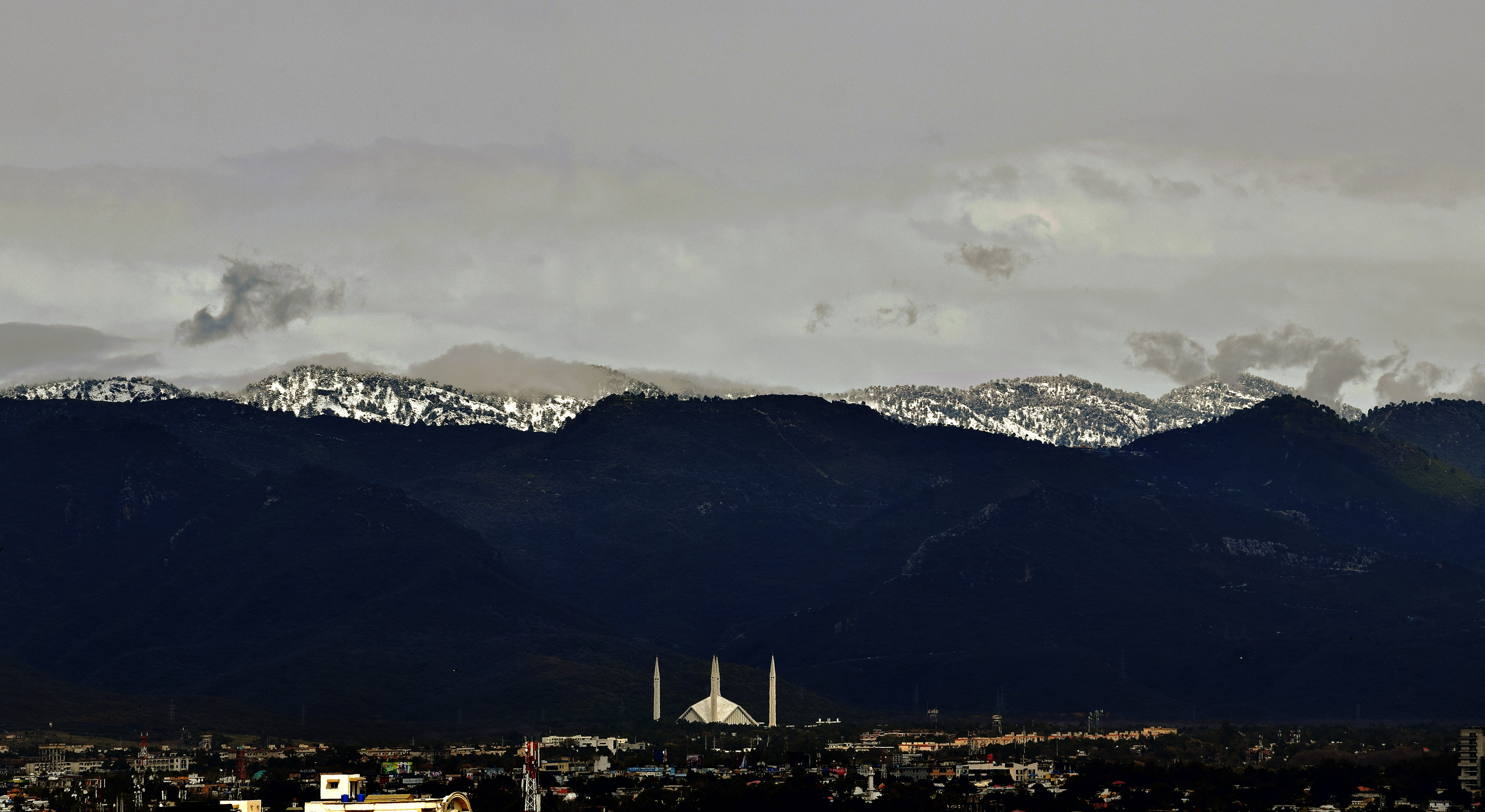
The mosque and Snow-capped Margalla Hills

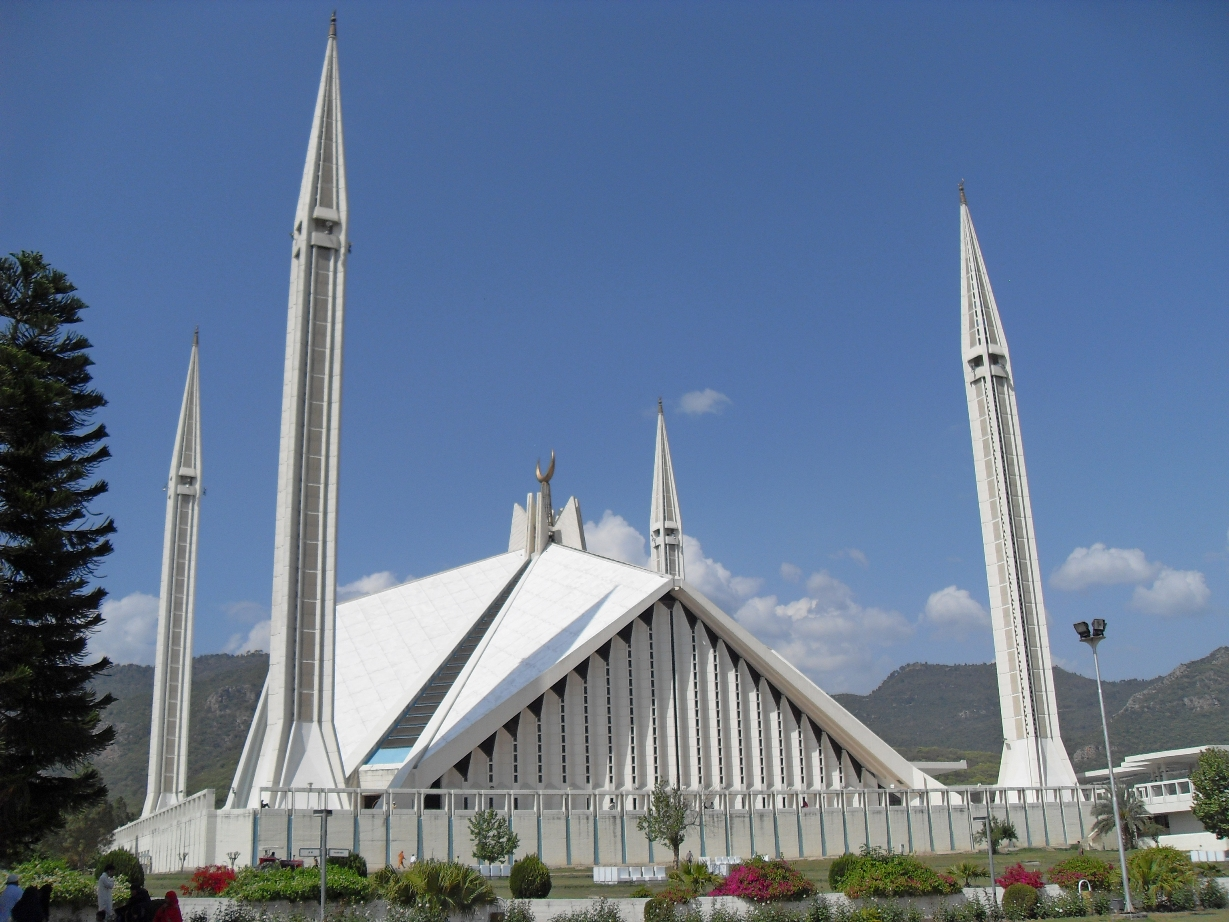
Elevation view of the mosque

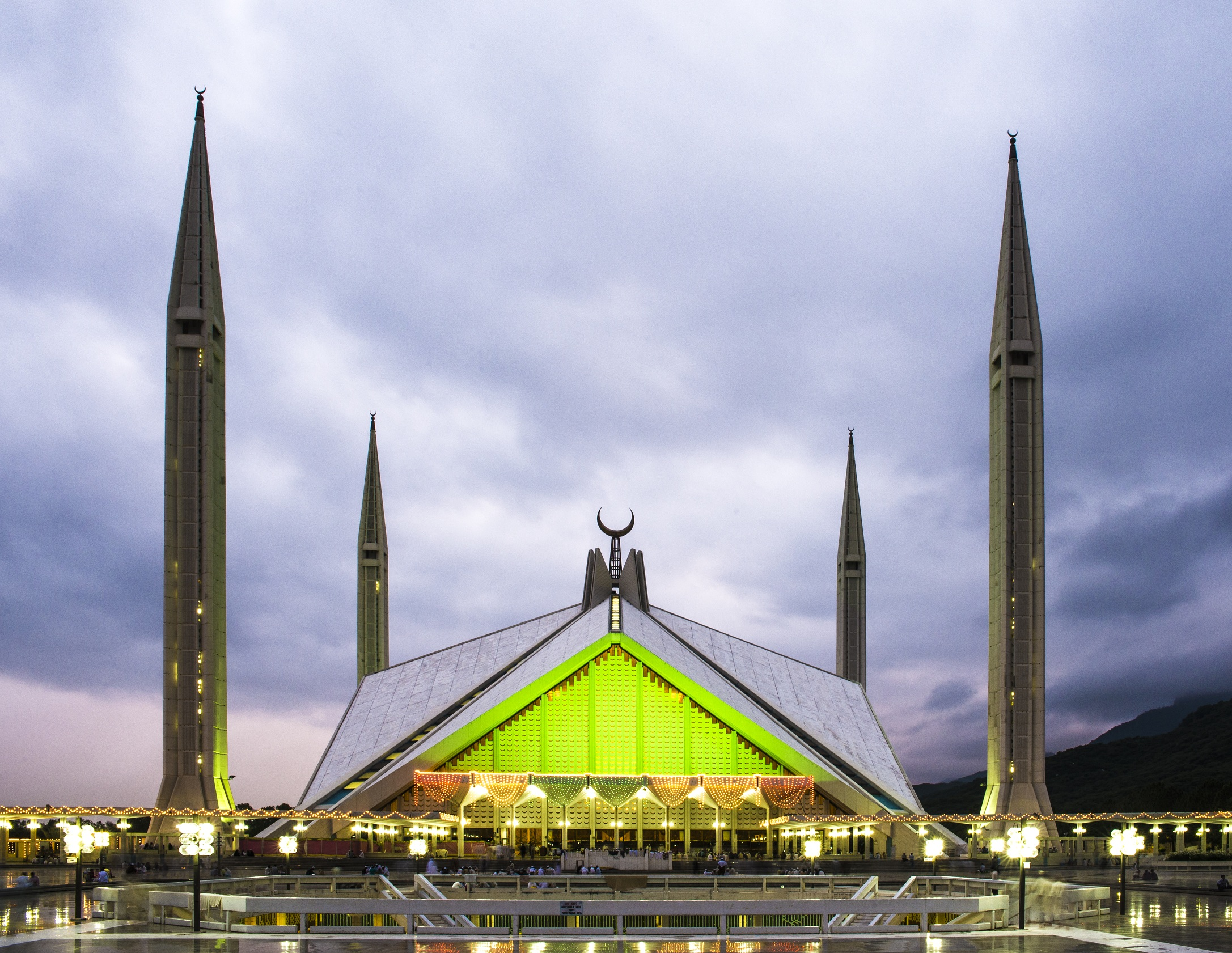
During 27th Ramadan

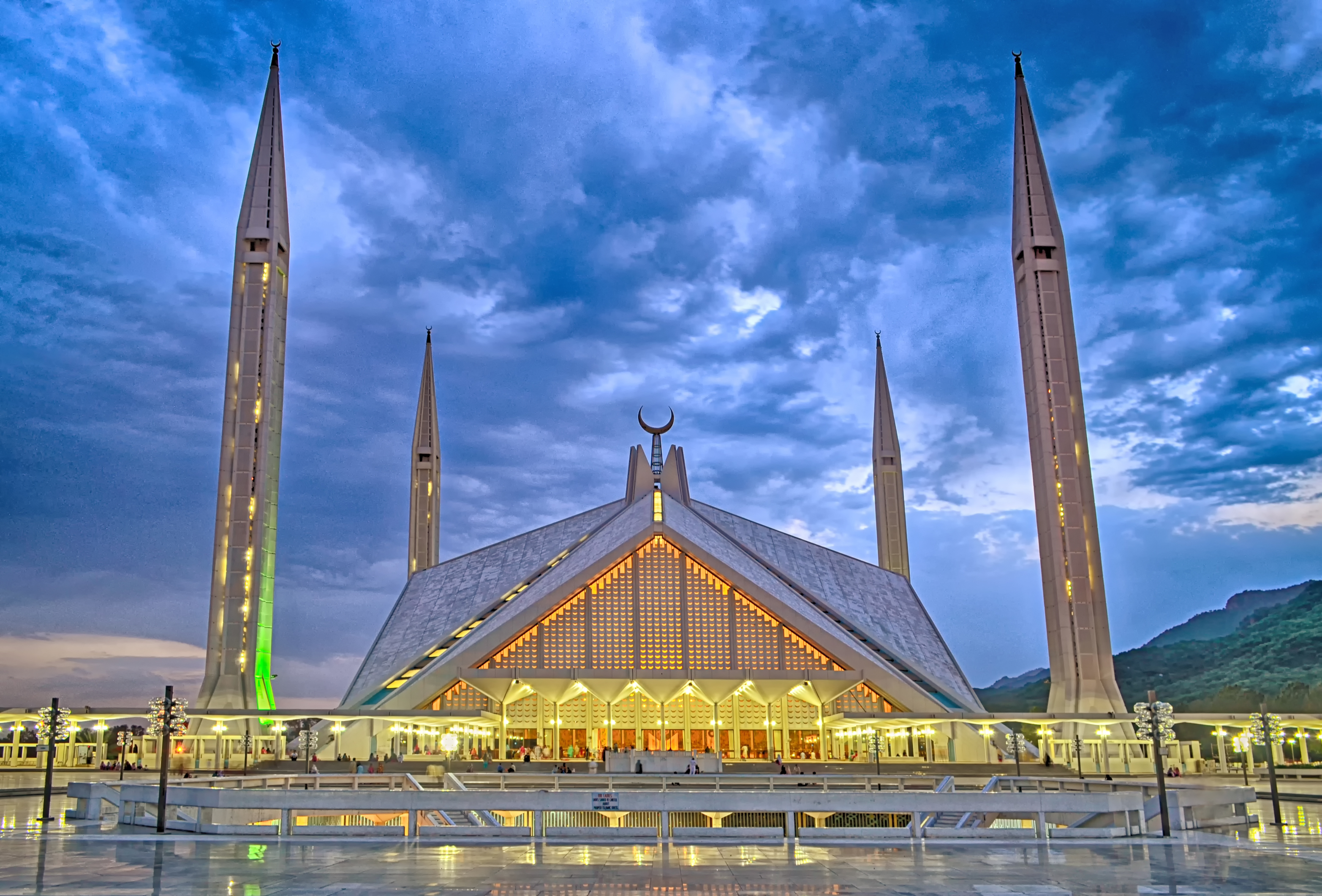

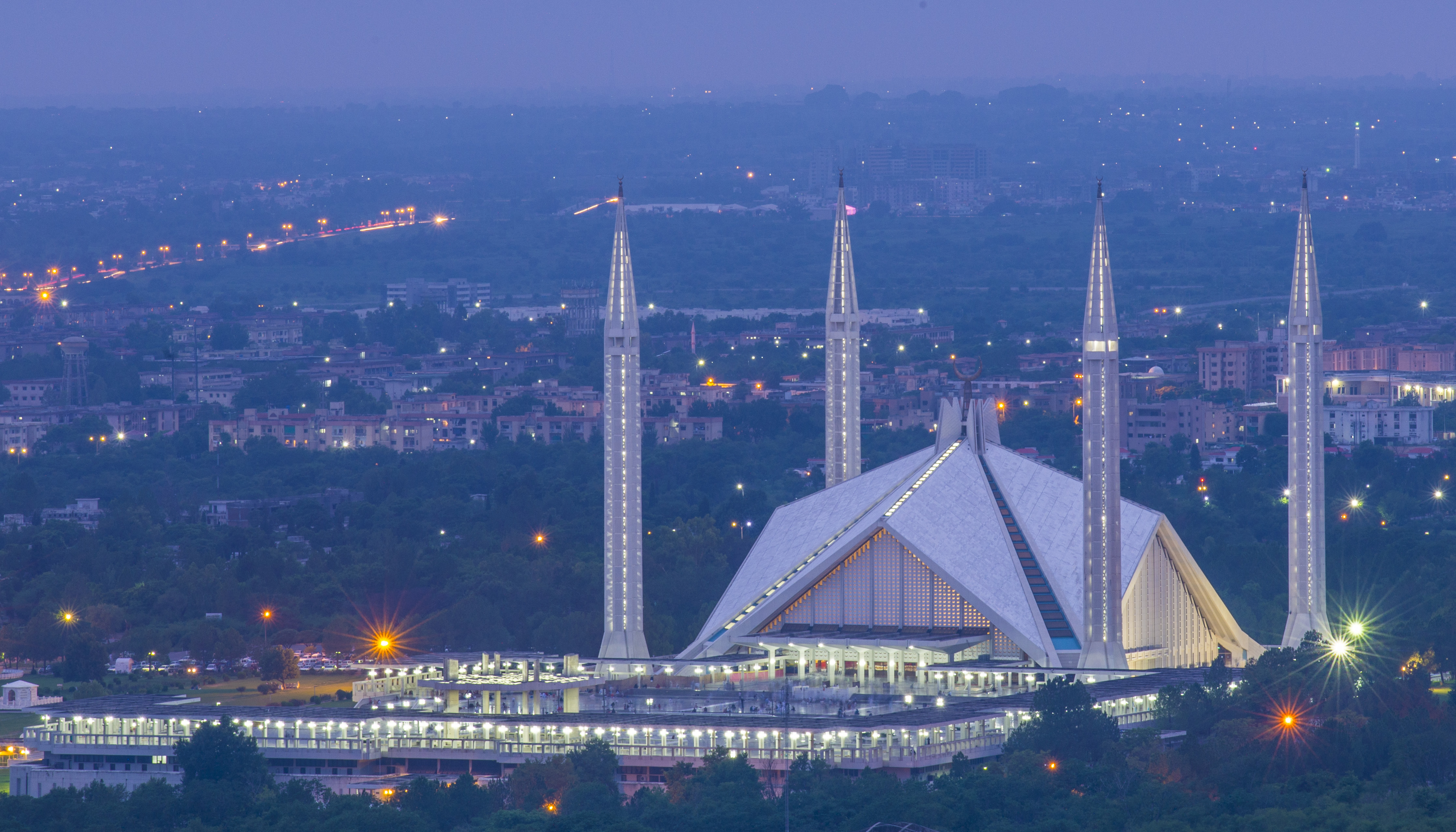
From Daman-e-Koh

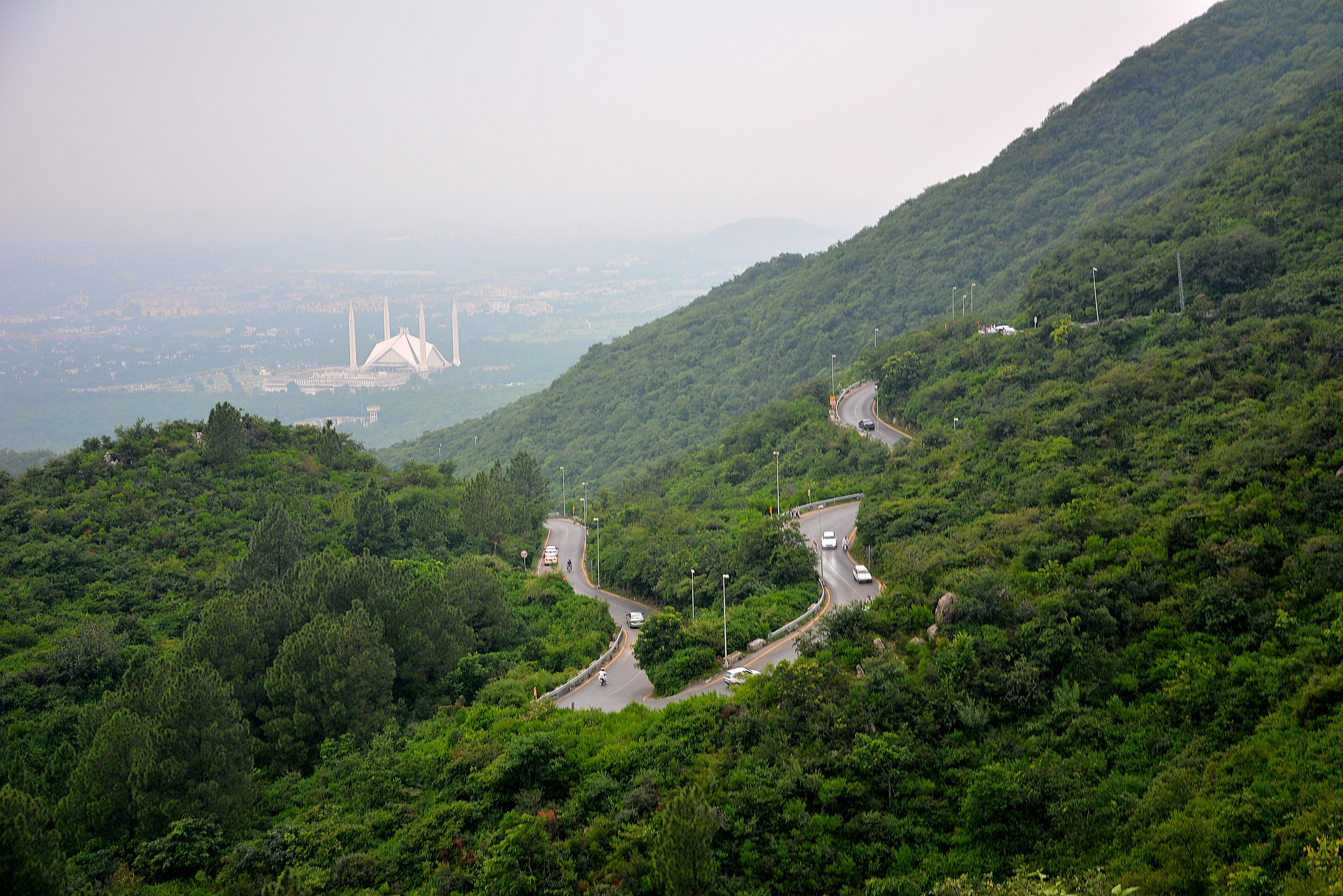
View from Margalla Hills

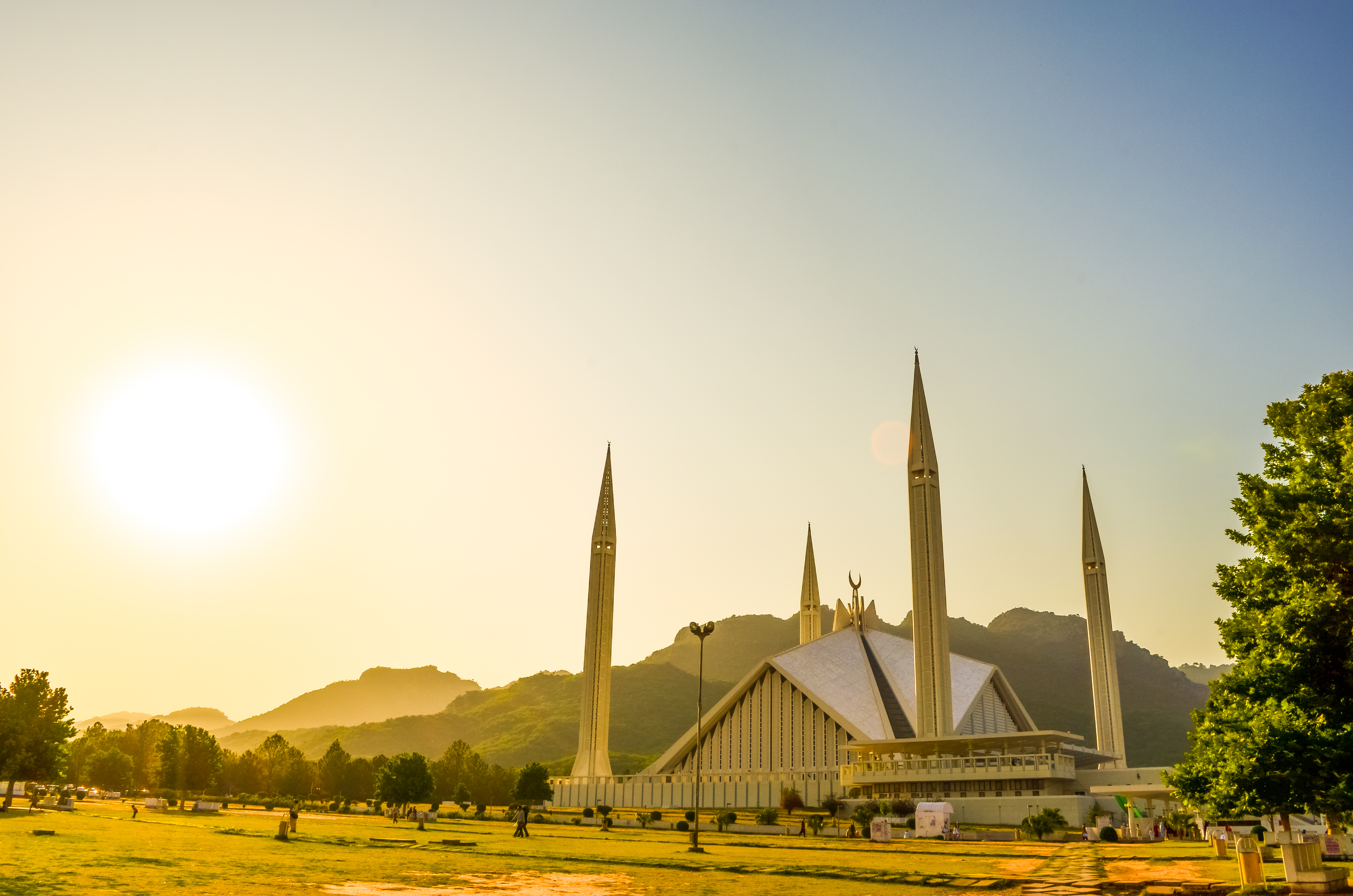
View before sunset

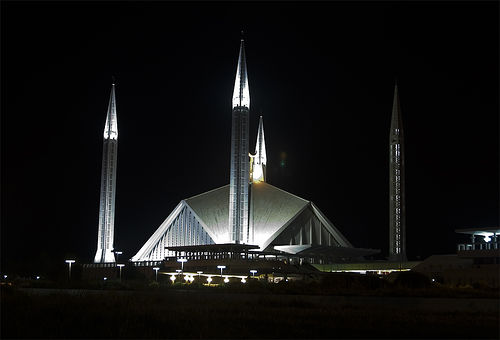
The mosque at night during prayer times

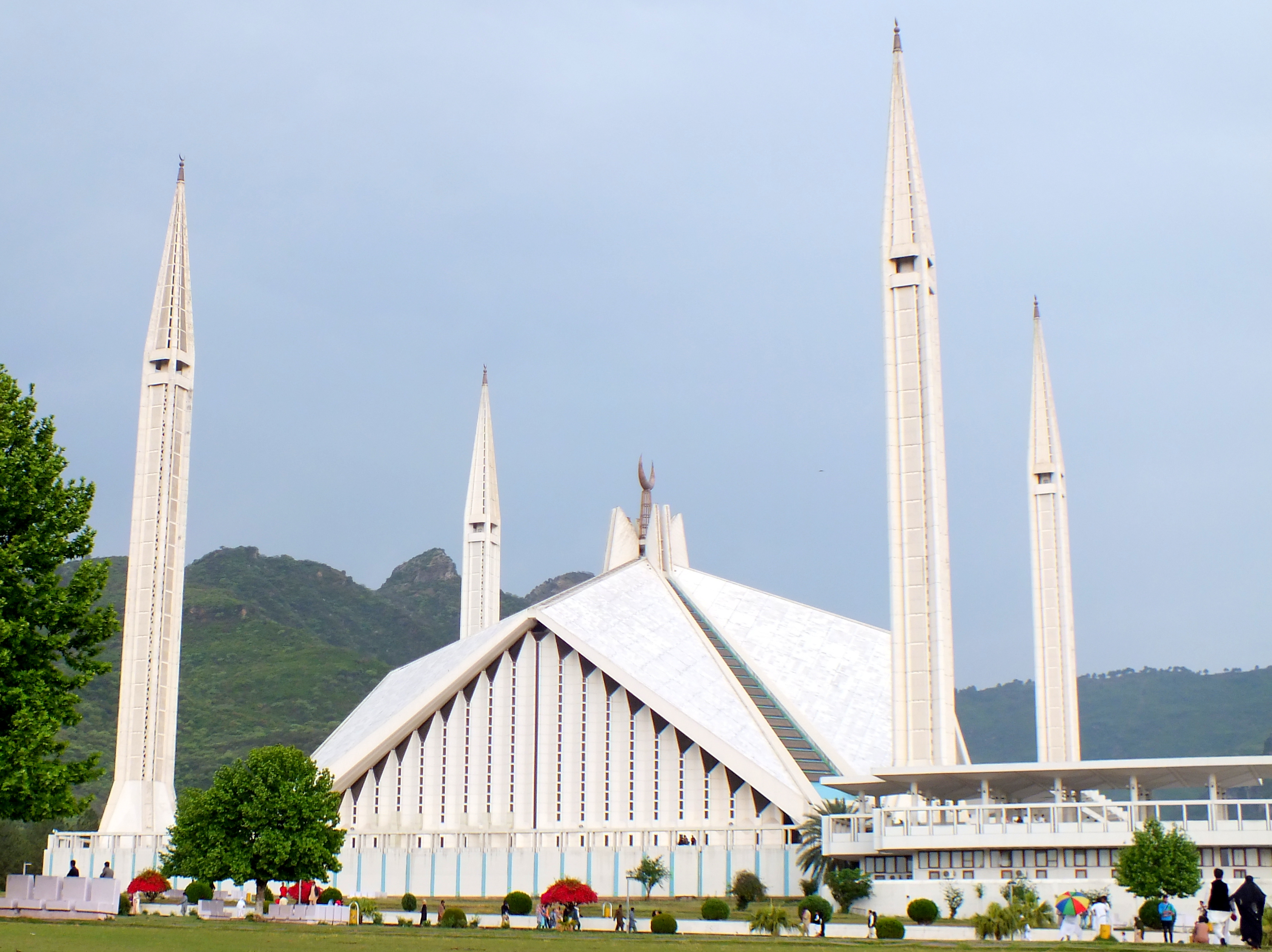
Faisal Masjid in cloudy weather

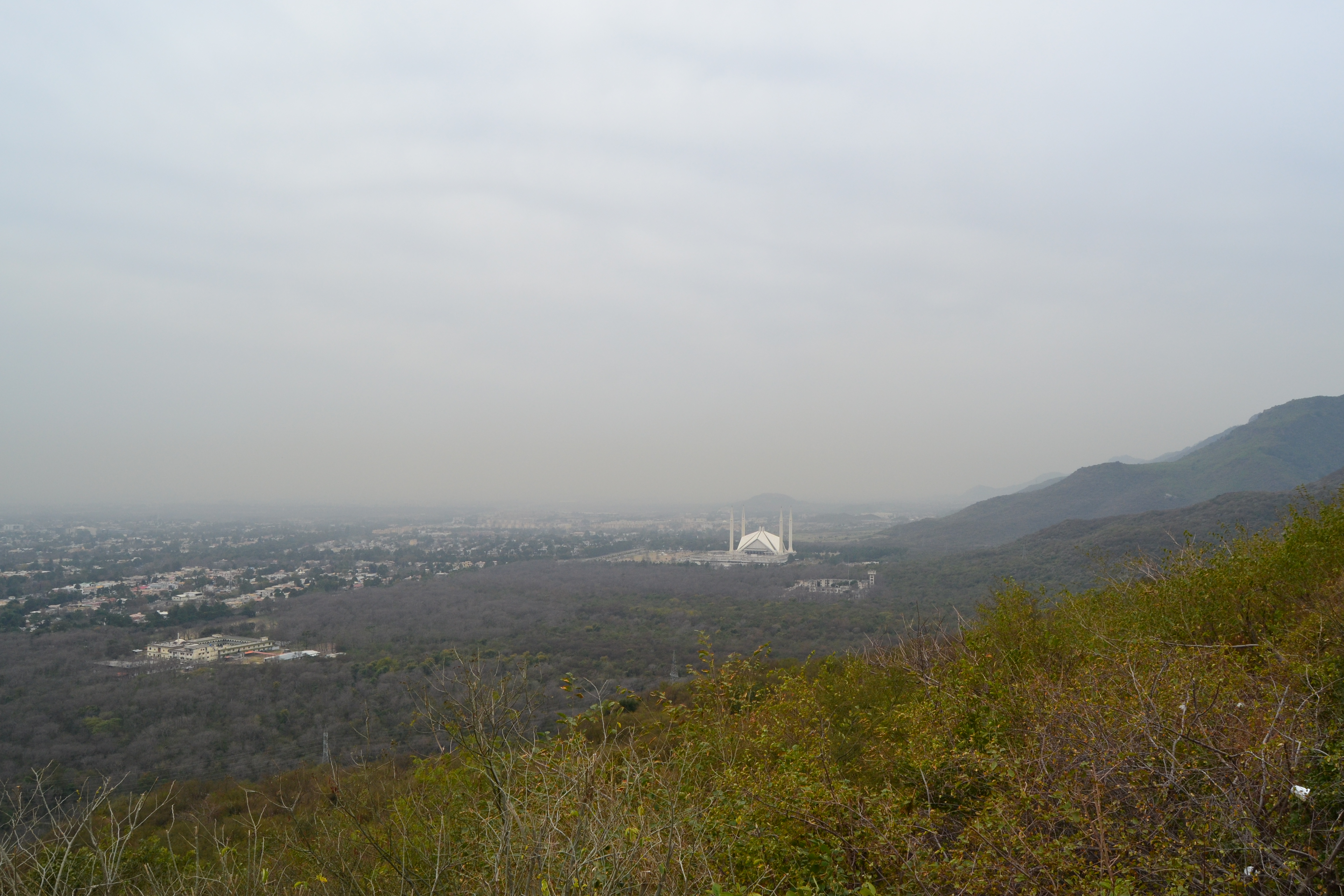
View of Faisal Mosque and Jamia Faridia from Daman-e-Koh, Islamabad

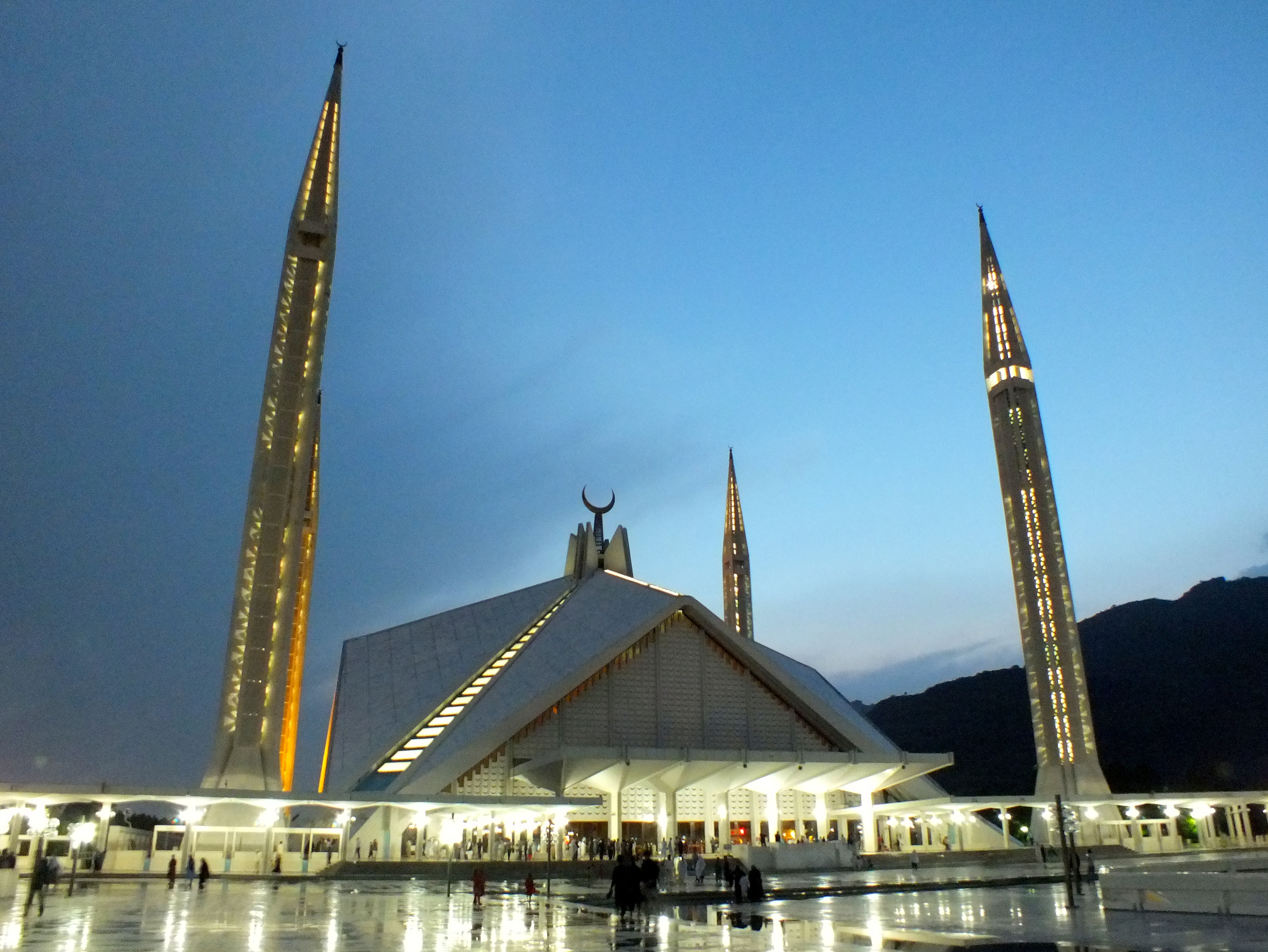
Faisal Masjid at twilight

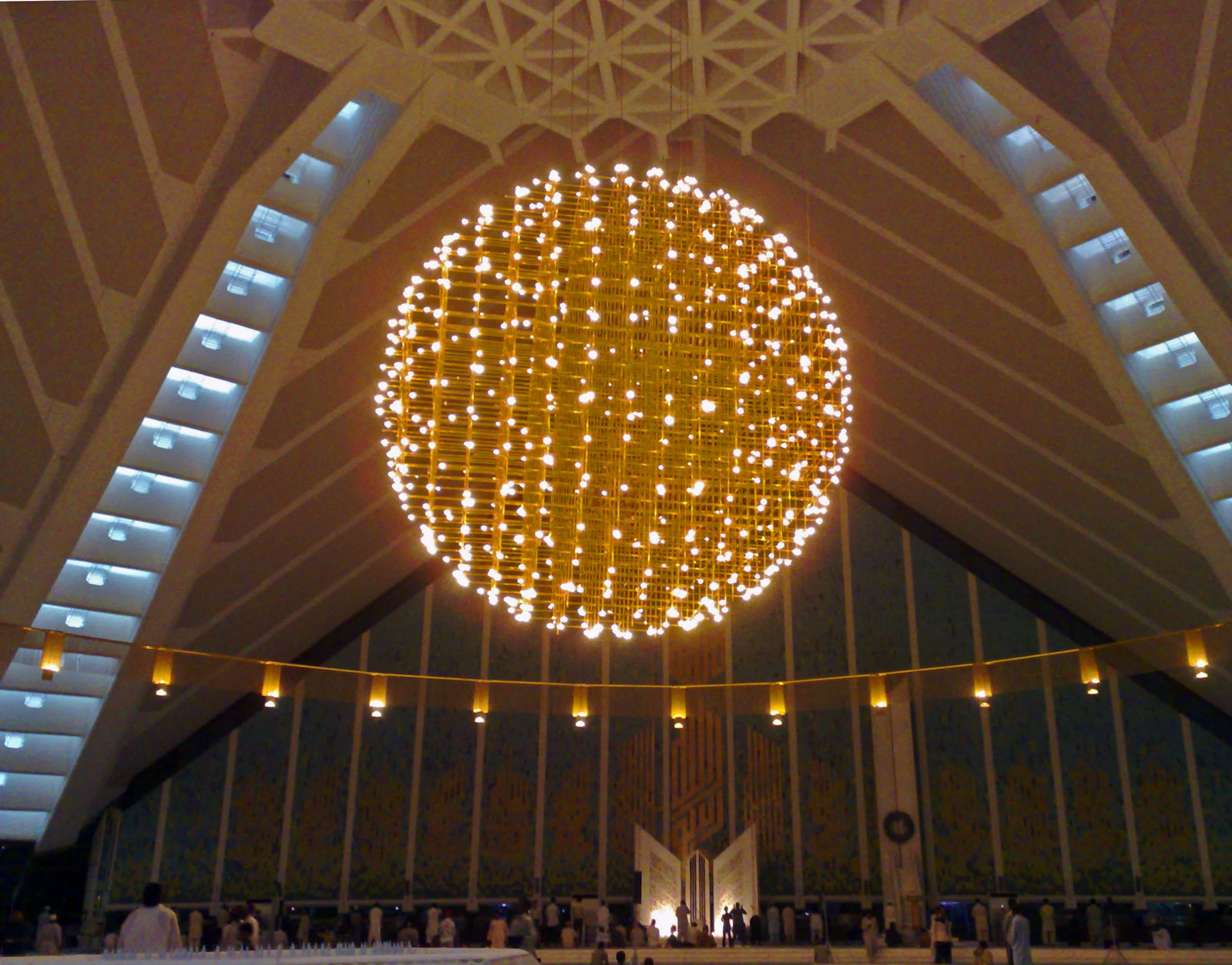
Faisal mosque main hall chandelier

== See also ==
- Badshahi Mosque
- Islamic art
- List of mosques in Pakistan
- List of largest mosques
- List of things named after Saudi kings
- Timeline of Muslim history
- Minar-e-Pakistan
