= List of burials at Cebeci Asri Cemetery =

This is an incomplete list of burials at Cebeci Asri Cemetery by occupation.

== A ==
Photo	Person	Notable for	Day of death	Grave photo	Source
	Abdulkerim Saraçoğlu	Turkish MD and senator	26 March 1991	133x133pik	
	Abdurrahman Kızılay	Turkish voice artist and composer	12 December 2010	133x133pik	
132x132pik	Abdülhalik Renda	Turkish statesman	1 October 1957	133x133pik	
	Abdülkadir Noyan	Turkish doctor, academician	5 September 1977	133x133pik	
	Abidin Yurdakul	Turkish politician	15 January 1950	133x133pik	
133x133pik	Adalet Ağaoğlu	Turkish writer	14 July 2020	133x133pik	
	Adnan Azar	Turkish poet	10 January 2014	133x133pik	
133x133pik	Afet İnan	Turkish academic and historian	8 June 1985	133x133pik	
	Ahmed Arif	Turkish poet and journalist	2 June 1991	133x133pik	
	Ahmed Mükerrem Karaağaç	Turkish politician	1949		
	Ahmet Eymir	Turkish politician	3 June 1964	133x133pik	
	Ahmet İhsan Gürsoy	Turkish politician	15 August 2008	133x133pik	
	Ahmet Gürkan	Turkish politician	20 February 1990	133x133pik	
	Ahmet Rifat Bilge	Turcologist	22 February 1953	133x133pik	
	Ahmet Sungur	Turkish politician	8 January 1948	133x133pik	
	Ahmet Tahtakılıç	Turkish politician	13 December 2000	133x133pik	
	Ahmet Nusret Tuna	Turkish politician	22 November 1988	133x133pik	
	Ahmet Gündüz Ökçün	Turkish politician and lawyer	26 November 1986	133x133pik	
	Ahmet Hamdi Akseki	Turkish theolog, former President of Religious Affairs	9 January 1951	133x133pik	
133x133pik	Ahmet Mithat Kalabalık	Turkish politician	30 January 1953	133x133pik	
	Ahmet Naşit Mengü	Turkish soldier and Atatürk's aide	29 October 1964		
	Ahmet Niyazi Mergen	Turkish bureaucrat	8 October 1959	133x133pik	
133x133pik	Ahmet Özer	Turkish bureaucrat	16 December 2014	133x133pik	
133x133pik	Ahmet Tevfik İleri	Turkish politician	31 December 1961	133x133pik	
	Ahmet Şener	Turkish politician	14 June 1991	133x133pik	
	Alaettin Hüsnü Öskiper	Turkish bureaucrat	22 March 2008	133x133pik	
	Ali Kami Akyüz	Turkish teacher, politician	11 March 1945	133x133pik	
	Ali Ecder Akışık	Turkish voice actor	28 September 2010	133x133pik	
	Ali Elverdi	Retired general and politician	17 April 2010	133x133pik	
133x133pik	Ali Galip Pekel	Turkish politician	13 March 1949		
	Ali Zırh	Turkish politician	8 May 1951	133x133pik	
	Arif Çubukçu	Turkish politician	28 March 1954	133x133pik	
	Arif Nusret Say	Turkish sportsman and sport manager	21 April 1995	133x133pik	
133x133pik	Atıf Tüzün	Turkish politician	3 April 1970	133x133pik	
	Asım Türeli	Turkish bureaucrat	30 November 1973	133x133pik	
	Aydın Sayılı	Turkish scientist	15 October 1993	133x133pik	
	Ayhan Baran	Turkish opera singer	24 July 2014		
	Aytaç Kardüz	Former TRT radio and TV presenter	14 July 2022	133x133pik	
	Azmiye Hami Güandn	Turkish writer	13 October 1954	133x133pik	

== B ==
Photo	Person	Notable for	Day of death	Grave photo	Source
	Baha Koldaş	Turkish politician	10 December 1965	133x133pik	
	Baki Komsuoğlu	Turkish doctor	23 January 2008	133x133pik	
	Baykal Saran	Turkish actor and director	28 July 2006	133x133pik	
	Bedri Gürsoy	Turkish academician and former minister of finance	15 April 1991	133x133pik	

== C ==
Photo	Person	Notable for	Day of death	Grave photo	Source
133x133pik	Cahit Sıtkı Tarancı	Turkish poet and writer	12 October 1956	133x133pik	
	Cahit Kınay	Turkish bureaucrat, archaeologist and art historian	31 July 2001		
133x133pik	Cavid Bey	Turkish politician	26 August 1926		
	Celil Gürkan	Turkish soldier	29 May 2014	133x133pik	
	Cemal Aydın	Turkish sports manager	8 December 2021	133x133pik	

== D ==
Photo	Person	Notable for	Day of death	Grave photo	Source
	Deniz Bölükbaşı	Turkish diplomat and politician	21 March 2018	133x133pik	
	Devrim Sağıroğlu	Turkish journalist and writer	6 July 2015	133x133pik	
133x133pik	Dilhan Eryurt	Turkish academician, astrophysicist	13 September 2012	133x133pik	
	Doğan Kasaroğlu	Turkish politician and journalist	26 May 1995	133x133pik	
133x133pik	Durul Gence	Turkish drummer, jazz musician and conductor	20 October 2021	133x133pik	
	Duygu Aykal	Turkish ballerina and choreographer	8 January 1988	133x133pik	

== E ==
Photo	Person	Notable for	Day of death	Grave photo	Source
	Ekrem Barlas	Former Mayor of Ankara and bureaucrat	18 February 1998	133x133pik	
	Ekrem Ceyhun	Turkish politician	1 April 2017	133x133pik	
	Ekrem Güyer	Turkish musician	19 February 1954	133x133pik	
	Ekrem Tüzemen	Turkish politician	13 December 1934	133x133pik	
133x133pik	Emin Fikri Eralp	Turkish politician	13 December 1934		
	Emin Özdemir	Turkish academician	1 September 2017	133x133pik	
	Enis Behiç Koryürek	Turkish poet, teacher, diplomat and bureaucrat	18 October 1949	133x133pik	
	Ergun Sav	Turkish diplomat	10 February 2015	133x133pik	
	Erman Şener	Turkish cinema critic, journalist, script and book writer	29 March 2002		
	Ernst Praetorius	German music historian, teacher and conductor	27 March 1946	133x133pik	
	Erol Çırakman	Eski Danıştay Başkanı	11 January 2021	133x133pik	
	Erol Kardeseci	Turkish actor	15 May 2012	133x133pik	
133x133pik	Ethem Menemencioğlu	Turkish lawyer and politician	26 August 1965	133x133pik	
	Eyüp Sabri Hayırlıoğlu	Turkish lawyer, theolog, politician and former President of Religious Affairs	8 October 1960	133x133pik	

== F ==
Photo	Person	Notable for	Day of death	Grave photo	Source
	Fahir Özgüden	Turkish athlete	8 August 1979	133x133pik	
	Fahri Kopuz	Oud virtuoso	7 January 1968		
133x133pik	Fakihe Öymen	Turkish politician and school teacher	6 April 1983	133x133pik	
	Fatih Urunç	Turkish painter	8 August 2012		
	Ferda Güley	Turkish soldier and politician	17 November 2008	133x133pik	
	Ferit Melen	Turkish politician and former prime minister of Republic of Turkey	3 September 1988	133x133pik	
	Ferit Sıdal	Turkish composer	9 August 2001	133x133pik	
	Fethi Gürcan	Turkish soldier	27 June 1964	133x133pik	

== G ==
Photo	Person	Notable for	Day of death	Grave photo	Source
	Galip Balkar	Turkish diplomat	11 March 1983	133x133pik	
	Galip Erdem	Turkish journalist	12 March 1997	133x133pik	
	Galip Mendi	Turkish soldier	24 August 2024	133x133pik	
	Gurhan Çelebican	Turkish politician	25 December 2013		
	Gülşen Girginkoç	Turkish actor	17 February 2022	133x133pik	
	Güner Sümer	Turkish actor	27 April 1977	133x133pik	
	Günseli Özkaya	Turkish politician	1 December 2020	133x133pik	

== H ==
Photo	Person	Notable for	Day of death	Grave photo	Source
	Halil Boztepe	Turkish politician	17 February 1949	133x133pik	
133x133pik	Halil İbrahim Özkaya	Turkish politician and school teacher	26 January 1972	133x133pik	
133x133pik	Haluk Pekşen	Turkish politician and lawyer	16 September 2022	133x133pik	
	Haluk Timurtaş	Turkish politician	3 August 1987		
	Hamza Günalp	Turkish soldier	25 February 1977	133x133pik	
133x133pik	Hasan Âli Yücel	Turkish statesman, founder of Village Institutes	26 February 1961	133x133pik	
	Hasan Eren	Turcologist	26 May 2007	133x133pik	
	Hasan Tez	Turkish politician	21 April 1968	133x133pik	
	Hasan Yalçın	Activist, politician	29 August 2002	133x133pik	
	Hilmi Atlıoğlu	Turkish politician	11 February 1948	133x133pik	
	Hilmi Çoruk	Turkish politician	11 December 1947	133x133pik	
	Hüseyin Avni Sağesen	Turkish politician	8 November 2020	133x133pik	
133x133pik	Hüseyin Aziz Akyürek	Turkish bureaucrat and politician	15 August 1951		
133x133pik	Hüseyin Hüsnü Emir Erkilet	Turkish soldier, writer and politician	2 April 1958	133x133pik	
	Hüseyin İleri	Turkish musician	10 May 2017	133x133pik	
	Hüseyin Kocadağ	Turkish police, former Istanbul Deputy Chief of Police	3 November 1996	133x133pik	
	Hüseyin Maloğlu	Football player	31 July 2009	133x133pik	
	Hüseyin Namık Orkun	Turkish academician and historian	23 March 1956	133x133pik	

== İ ==
Photo	Person	Notable for	Day of death	Grave photo	Source
133x133pik	İbrahim Alaettin Gövsa	Turkish writer, poet and politician	29 October 1949	133x133pik	
133x133pik	İbrahim Bey Haydarov	Engineer and politician	23 September 1949	133x133pik	
	İbrahim İmirzalıoğlu	Turkish politician	5 November 2010	133x133pik	
	İbrahim Şevki Atasagun	Turkish politician and doctor	28 May 1984	133x133pik	
133x133pik	İhsan Hamit Tiğrel	Turkish politician	4 April 1985	133x133pik	
	İhsan Sungu	Turkish linguist	11 April 1946	133x133pik	
	İlhan Baran	Turkish musician, teacher	27 November 2016		
	İlhan Bardakçı	Turkish journalist, writer	27 February 2004	133x133pik	
133x133pik	İlhan Cavcav	Turkish businessman and sports manager	22 January 2017	133x133pik	
	İlkan San	Turkish poet, songwriter	20 October 2008	133x133pik	
	İsmail Arar	Politician and lawyer	20 March 1993	133x133pik	

== K ==
Photo	Person	Notable for	Day of death	Grave photo	Source
	Kamil Tuğrul Coşkunoğlu	Turkish politician	19 December 1995	133x133pik	
	Kamuran Özbir	Turkish journalist, writer and poet	5 December 2018		
	Kâni Vrana	Turkish lawyer	17 June 1984	133x133pik	
	Kemal Akkaya	Turkish politician	2 March 2021	133x133pik	
	Kemal Ataman	Turkish journalist and politician	8 December 2015	133x133pik	
	Kemal Cantürk	Turkish politician	29 March 2012	133x133pik	
	Kemalettin Kamu	Turkish poet and politician	6 March 1948	133x133pik	
	Kerim Afşar	Turkish actor	26 September 2003	133x133pik	
	Kudret Kantoğlu	Turkish bureaucrat	1 July 1965	133x133pik	
133x133pik	Kurtcebe Noyan	Turkish soldier	7 May 1951	133x133pik	
	Kurthan Fişek	Turkish academician and journalist	17 September 2012	133x133pik	

== L ==
Photo	Person	Notable for	Day of death	Grave photo	Source
133x133pik	Levon Ekmekjian	ASALA member, his grave has been moved from Cebeci Asri Cemetery in 2016.	29 January 1983		
	Lütfi Doğan	Turkish theologian, politician and former President of Religious Affairs	22 January 2018	133x133pik	

== M ==
Photo	Person	Notable for	Day of death	Grave photo	Source
	Mahmut Cuhruk	Turkish lawyer	8 October 2018	133x133pik	
133x133pik	Makbule Atadan	Turkish writer, politician and Mustafa Kemal Atatürk's sister	18 January 1956	133x133pik	
	Makbule Dıblan	Turkish doctor and politician	25 August 1970	133x133pik	
133x133pik	Mahammad Amin Rasulzade	Azerbaijani statesman and founder of Azerbaijan Democratic Republic	6 March 1955	133x133pik	
	Mehmet Faruk Sükan	Turkish politician, former minister	3 January 2005	133x133pik	
133x133pik	Mehmet Kadri Üçok	Turkish politician	29 May 1958	133x133pik	
	Mehmet Rifat Börekçi	Turkish theolog, politician and First President of Religious Affairs	5 March 1941	133x133pik	
133x133pik	Mehmet Rifat Vardar	Turkish politician	5 June 1948	133x133pik	
	Mehmet Şevket Erdoğan	Turkish politician	29 January 1964	133x133pik	
	Mehmet Tevfik Gerçeker	Turkish lawyer, theolog, and former President of Religious Affairs	28 January 1982		
	Melahat Gedik	Turkish lawyer and politician	28 July 1999		
133x133pik	Memduh Şevket Esendal	Turkish writer, diplomat and politician	11 March 1983	133x133pik	
	Metin Milli	Turkish musician	16 June 2023	133x133pik	
	Metin Toker	Turkish journalist and writer	18 July 2002	133x133pik	
133x133pik	Metin Uca	Turkish voice actor, writer	17 November 2023	133x133pik	
	Metin Yalman	Turkish journalist	19 June 2016	133x133pik	
133x133pik	Mevhibe İnönü	Spouse of second president of Turkey İsmet İnönü	7 February 1992	133x133pik	
	Misbah Ongan	Turkish politician	13 December 2014		
	Muammer Aksoy	Turkish lawyer, politician and writer	31 January 1990	133x133pik	
	Muammer Alakant	Turkish politician	15 April 1974		
	Muhan Soysal	Turkish academician	2 August 2006	133x133pik	
	Mustafa Ekmekçi	Turkish writer and journalist	21 May 1997	133x133pik	
133x133pik	Mustafa Ferit Arsan	Turkish politician	9 October 1941	133x133pik	
133x133pik	Mustafa Fevzi Sarhan	Turkish lawyer and politician	19 September 1933		
	Mustafa Kazım Atakul	Turkish bureaucrat	29 August 1970	133x133pik	
133x133pik	Mustafa Necati	Turkish politician, lawyer, teacher	1 January 1929	133x133pik	
	Mustafa Rüştü Taşar	Turkish politician	3 January 2007	133x133pik	
133x133pik	Muzaffer Sarısözen	Turkish artist	4 January 1963	133x133pik	
	Müjgân Cunbur	Turkish literary researcher	25 September 2013	133x133pik	
	Müzehher Güyer	Turkish musician	4 April 1998	133x133pik	

== N ==
Photo	Person	Notable for	Day of death	Grave photo	Source
	Nafi Atuf Kansu	Turkish politician and teacher	28 October 1949	133x133pik	
	Naşit Fırat	Turkish politician	2 August 1978	133x133pik	
	Nazlı Ecevit	Turkish painter and mother of Bülent Ecevit the 16th prime minister of Turkey	14 August 1985	133x133pik	
	Nazire Dedeman	Turkish entrepreneur	4 February 2019	133x133pik	
	Necdet Calp	Turkish bureaucrat and politician	13 September 1998	133x133pik	
	Necdet Darıcıoğlu	Turkish lawyer	14 September 2016	133x133pik	
	Necmettin Cevheri	Turkish politician	5 September 2023	133x133pik	
133x133pik	Nevzat Tandoğan	Turkish bureaucrat	9 July 1946	133x133pik	
	Nihat Nuri Yörükoğlu	Turkish medicine historian and doctor	9 January 1994	133x133pik	
	Nihat Tulunay	Turkish soldier	31 October 1998	133x133pik	
133x133pik	Nilüfer Gürsoy	Turkish politician and daughter of Celâl Bayar	2 July 2024	133x133pik	
	Niyazi Dalokay	Turkish bureaucrat	3 July 1967	133x133pik	
133x133pik	Numan Menemencioğlu	Turkish diplomat and politician	15 February 1958	133x133pik	
	Nusret Çetinel	Turkish actor	1 September 2021	133x133pik	
133x133pik	Nusret Fişek	Turkish doctor	3 November 1990	133x133pik	
	Nusret Karasu	Turkish MD, academician, soldier and statesman	12 August 1987	133x133pik	

== O ==
Photo	Person	Notable for	Day of death	Grave photo	Source
	Oğuz Akşit	Turkish football player	3 June 2011	133x133pik	
	Oğuz Aygün	Turkish politician	17 January 2013	133x133pik	
	Oğuz Kayaalp	Turkish doctor	3 October 2013	133x133pik	
133x133pik	Oğuzhan Asiltürk	Turkish politician	1 October 2021	133x133pik	
	Onur Kumbaracıbaşı	Turkish politician	15 February 2022	133x133pik	
	Ordal Demokan	Turkish physicist and academician	29 October 2004		
	Orhan Alp	Turkish politician	21 January 2010	133x133pik	
	Orhan Asena	Turkish poet	15 February 2001	133x133pik	
133x133pik	Osman Bölükbaşı	Turkish politician	6 February 2002	133x133pik	
133x133pik	Osman Nuri Koptagel	Turkish soldier and politician	22 November 1942	133x133pik	
	Osman Olcay	Turkish diplomat	12 September 2010	133x133pik	
	Osman Rafet Aksoy	Turkish politician	31 December 1967	133x133pik	
	Osman Yüksel Serdengeçti	Turkish politician, journalist and poet	10 November 1983	133x133pik	

== Ö ==
Photo	Person	Notable for	Day of death	Grave photo	Source
	Ömer Haluk Sipahioğlu	Turkish diplomat	4 July 1994	133x133pik	
	Özay Gönlüm	Turkish vocal artist	1 March 2000	133x133pik	

== R ==
Photo	Person	Notable for	Day of death	Grave photo	Source
133x133pik	Raif Karadeniz	Turkish politician	30 June 1976	133x133pik	
	Recai İskenderoğlu	Turkish politician	30 April 2000	133x133pik	
133x133pik	Refik Koraltan	Turkish politician	17 June 1974	133x133pik	
133x133pik	Refik Saydam	Turkish doctor, politician and former prime minister	8 July 1942	133x133pik	
	Reşide Bayar	Spouse of 3rd president of Turkey Celâl Bayar	24 December 1962	133x133pik	
133x133pik	Reşit Galip	Turkish politician	5 March 1934	133x133pik	
133x133pik	Rıdvan Ege	Turkish doctor	8 June 2017	133x133pik	
	Rukiye Belkıs Baykan	Turkish politician	30 June 1983		
	Rüştü Erdelhun	Turkish soldier	9 November 1983	133x133pik	
	Rüştü Yüce	National sportsman	25 September 1996	133x133pik	

== S ==
Photo	Person	Notable for	Day of death	Grave photo	Source
	Sabri Şakir Ansay	Turkish lawyer and academician	9 November 1962		
	Sadık Perinçek	Turkish politician	13 September 2000	133x133pik	
	Sadun Aren	Turkish politician	8 March 2008	133x133pik	
	Salih Ragıp Üner	Turkish politician, minister	31 August 1994	133x133pik	
	Savaş Başar	Turkish actor and vocal artist	21 August 1985	133x133pik	
	Savaş Yurttaş	Turkish actor	8 April 2002	133x133pik	
	Sekine Evren	Spouse of Kenan Evren	3 March 1982	133x133pik	
	Selahattin Babüroğlu	Turkish politician	5 June 2021	133x133pik	
	Semih Günver	Turkish diplomat	10 January 2000	133x133pik	
	Sırrı Atalay	Turkish politician and lawyer	9 September 1985	133x133pik	
133x133pik	Sırrı İçöz	Turkish politician	8 January 1963	133x133pik	
	Solmaz Ünaydın	Turkish diplomat	26 August 2010		
	Suphi Ziya Özbekkan	Turkish composer and lawyer	19 July 1966	133x133pik	

== Ş ==
Photo	Person	Notable for	Day of death	Grave photo	Source
	Şaban Karataş	Turkish politician	14 February 2016		
	Şahin Mengü	Turkish lawyer and politician	20 September 2021		
	Şarık Arıyak	Turkish academician and diplomat	17 December 1980	133x133pik	
133x133pik	Şefik Fenmen	Turkish diplomat	17 December 1980	133x133pik	
133x133pik	Şemsettin Günaltay	Former prime minister of Turkey	19 October 1961	133x133pik	
	Şerif Ercan	Turkish statesman	12 June 2018	133x133pik	
	Şevket Aziz Kansu	Turkish doctor and academician	10 April 1983	133x133pik	
	Şevket Süreyya Aydemir	Turkish writer	25 March 1976	133x133pik	
	Şevket Kazan	Turkish lawyer, politician and former minister	16 July 1969	133x133pik	
	Şiar Yalçın	Turkish writer and translator	17 October 2010		
	Şükran Özkaya	Turkish soldier and politician	2 February 2014	133x133pik	
	Şükrü Kaymakçalan	Turkish doctor	22 July 1984	133x133pik	

== T ==
Photo	Person	Notable for	Day of death	Grave photo	Source
	Tahsin Çelebican	Turkish soldier	27 January 1962	133x133pik	
133x133pik	Tahsin Yazıcı	Turkish soldier and politician	11 February 1970	133x133pik	
	Talat Aydemir	Turkish soldier	5 July 1964	133x133pik	
133x133pik	Talat Sönmez	Turkish politician	24 June 1950	133x133pik	
	Taner Şener	Turkish musician	30 August 1993	133x133pik	
	Taylan Özgür	Political activist	23 September 1969	133x133pik	
	Temel Karamahmut	Turkish director, senarist and actor	8 January 1963	133x133pik	
133x133pik	Tunalı Hilmi	Turkish politician	26 July 1928	133x133pik	
	Turan Dursun	Turkish writer and theologian	4 September 1990	133x133pik	
	Turan Yavuz	Turkish journalist	14 May 2007	133x133pik	
	Turhan Feyzioğlu	Turkish politician and academician	24 March 1988	133x133pik	
	Turhan Özek	Turkish singer	26 November 1990	133x133pik	

== U ==
Photo	Person	Notable for	Day of death	Grave photo	Source
	Uğur Mumcu	Turkish journalist, writer and researcher	24 January 1993	133x133pik	
	Utkan Kocatürk	Turkish academician and politician	12 March 2011	133x133pik	

== Ü ==
Photo	Person	Notable for	Day of death	Grave photo	Source
	Ünal İnanç	Turkish journalist	6 March 2015	133x133pik	

== V ==
Photo	Person	Notable for	Day of death	Grave photo	Source
	Vasfi Mahir Kocatürk	Turkish poet, teacher and politician	17 July 1961	133x133pik	
133x133pik	Vecihi Hürkuş	Turkish pilot, engineer and entrepreneur	16 July 1969	133x133pik	
133x133pik	Vasıf Çınar	Turkish politician, journalist and teacher	2 June 1935	133x133pik	
	Vedat Dalokay	Turkish politician, former mayor of Ankara	27 March 1991	133x133pik	
133x133pik	Veled Çelebi İzbudak	Turkish academician, poet and politician	4 May 1953	133x133pik	
	Veysel Atasoy	Turkish politician	24 August 2004	133x133pik	

== Y ==
Photo	Person	Notable for	Day of death	Grave photo	Source
	Yener Rakıcıoğlu	Turkish bureaucrat	13 January 2015	133x133pik	
	Yiğit Köker	Turkish politician	1 April 1999	133x133pik	
	Yüksel Bozer	Turkish doctor and academician	7 November 2019	133x133pik	

== Z ==
Photo	Person	Notable for	Day of death	Grave photo	Source
	Zakir Kadiri Ugan	Tatar historian and writer	22 October 1954	133x133pik	
	Zihni Orhon	Turkish soldier and politician	26 December 1955	133x133pik	
	Ziya Soylu	Turkish politician	15 April 1987	133x133pik	
	Ziya Taşkent	Turkish musician	17 August 1999	133x133pik	
