= Yaltkaya =

Yaltkaya is a surname. Notable people with the surname include:

- Korkut Yaltkaya (1938-2001), Turkish neuropsychiatrist, electrophysiologist and academician
- Mehmet Şerefettin Yaltkaya (1880–1947), Turkish religious scholar
