= Korkut Yaltkaya =

Turkish neurologist

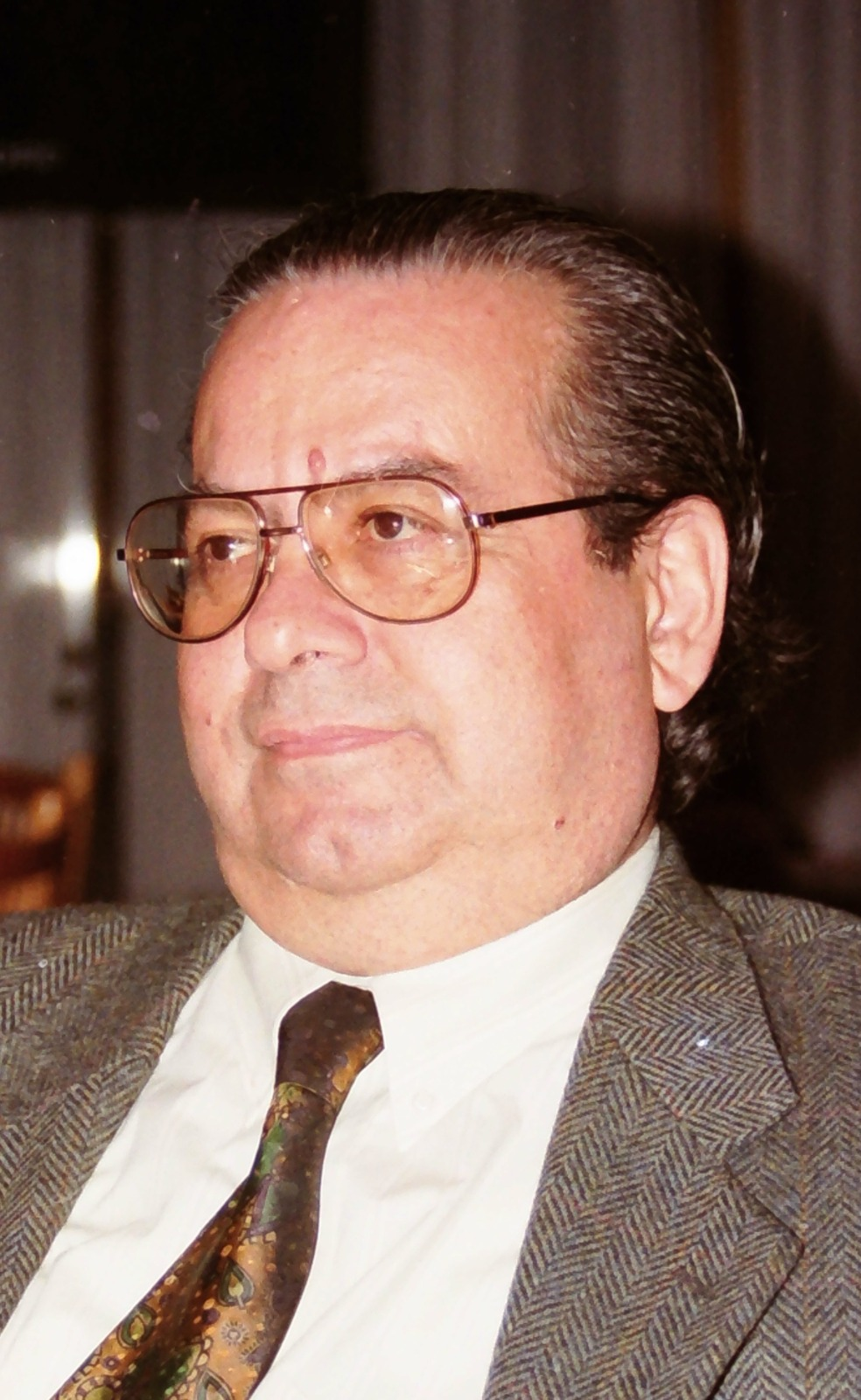
- Born: 27 May 1938; Istanbul, Turkey
- Died: 23 December 2001 (aged 63); Antalya, Turkey
- Education: Ankara University Faculty of Medicine (M.D.)
- Scientific career
- Fields: Clinical neurophysiology
- Workplaces: Ankara University Faculty of Medicine, University of Copenhagen, Akdeniz University Faculty of Medicine
- Thesis: Mechanical and Electrophysiological Parameters of Normal, Stiff, Rigid Patellar Reflex (1971)

Korkut Yaltkaya (27 May 1938 – 23 December 2001) was a Turkish neuropsychiatrist, electrophysiologist and academic.

== Biography ==
Yaltkaya was born in Istanbul on 27 May 1938. After graduating from the Ankara Atatürk High School in 1955, he graduated from the Ankara University Faculty of Medicine in 1962. In 1966, he became a neuropsychiatrist at the Ankara University Faculty of Medicine. In 1967, he worked on electromyography at the Clinical Neurophysiology Laboratory of the University of Copenhagen with a Danish government scholarship. Upon returning to Turkey, he became a docent at the Ankara University Faculty of Medicine in 1971 with his thesis titled Mechanical and Electrophysiological Parameters of Normal, Stiff, Rigid Patellar Reflex. Yaltkaya, who was promoted to professorship on 28 September 1979, was assigned to establish the Department of Neurology at the Akdeniz University Faculty of Medicine in Antalya. He was the head of this department for 22 years until his death. During his career, Yaltkaya wrote around 300 domestic and foreign articles and organized clinical neurophysiology congresses at national level twice. He was known as one of Turkey's two most important neurophysiologists when he died.

Korkut Yaltkaya was a son of Mehmet Şerefettin Yaltkaya, who served as the 2nd president of religious affairs of Turkey after had led Mustafa Kemal Atatürk's funeral prayer.

== After his death ==
Two days after his death on 23 December 2001, a ceremony was held at the Akdeniz University for him. Since 23 December 2006, a clinical neurophysiology symposium on behalf of Korkut Yaltkaya has been organized by the Akdeniz University every December.
