= Burhanettin Muz =

Turkish diplomat

Turkey Ambassador to Algeria
- In office 1 September 1995 – 20 August 1999
- President: Süleyman Demirel
- Preceded by: Ümit Pamir
- Succeeded by: Atilla Uzer

Personal details
- Born: 15 April 1939 (age 87) Anamur, Mersin, Turkey
- Education: Ankara University Faculty of Law

Burhanettin Muz (born 15 April 1939) is a Turkish diplomat and poet.

He graduated from Ankara Atatürk High School and Ankara University Faculty of Law. He started to work at the Ministry of Foreign Affairs in 1961.

He served as Turkey's ambassador to Algeria from 1995 to 1999. Apart from his duty as an ambassador, he served as the consul general of Karlsruhe between 1986 and 1990 and the consul general of Geneva between 2001 and 2003.

He also served as a member of the Ministry of Foreign Affairs Inspection Board between 1999-2001 and 2003–2004.
