= Rosmarie Frick =

Swiss nurse and lecturer

- Education: Viktoria-Hospital, Bern; University Hospital Zurich

Rosmarie Frick (born 26 December 1949) is a Swiss nurse and lecturer of a microsurgery course at the University Hospital of Zürich.

== Early life and education ==
Frick was born in Bazenheid. She was the daughter of peasants in Oberbüren, and decided to become a nurse when her parents were forced to sell their farm. She studied nursing at the Viktoria-Hospital in Bern, completing her placement at the Hospital at Flawil. This was a time of rising interest in neurosurgery in Zürich and, notably, Gazi Yaşargil performed such surgery to treat the cerebral vessels of a stroke sufferer.

== Research and career ==
Frick joined Gazi Yaşargil's team and learnt how to perform neurosurgery. Frick went on to work in several hospitals, including those in Zurich, Olten and Bern. She taught the neurosurgical microsurgery laboratory at the University Hospital of Zürich from 1979 until 2013. Over a career spanning more than 30 years, she has taught microsurgery in many countries, including Taipei, China, Italy, Turkey and Switzerland, Pakistan and Poland. She has taught thousands of young surgeons, including many vascular surgeons.

Her story has been documented by the Swiss public radio and broadcast television company SRF. She earned an honorary doctorate from Yeditepe University Hospital, Istanbul, in 2017.
