= Ahmet Hamdi Akseki =

Islamic scholar

Vice President of the Directorate of Religious Affairs
- In office 20 July 1939 – 29 April 1947

President of the Directorate of Religious Affairs
- In office 29 April 1947 – 9 January 1951
- President: İsmet İnönü, Celâl Bayar
- Preceded by: Mehmet Şerefettin Yaltkaya
- Succeeded by: Eyüp Sabri Hayırlıoğlu

Personal details
- Born: 1886 Güzelsu, Antalya Province
- Died: 9 January 1951 (aged 64–65)

Ahmet Hamdi Akseki (1886 – 9 January 1951) was an Islamic scholar who served as the President of the Directorate of Religious Affairs in Turkey. The Ahmet Hamdi Akseki Mosque is named after him.

== Biography ==
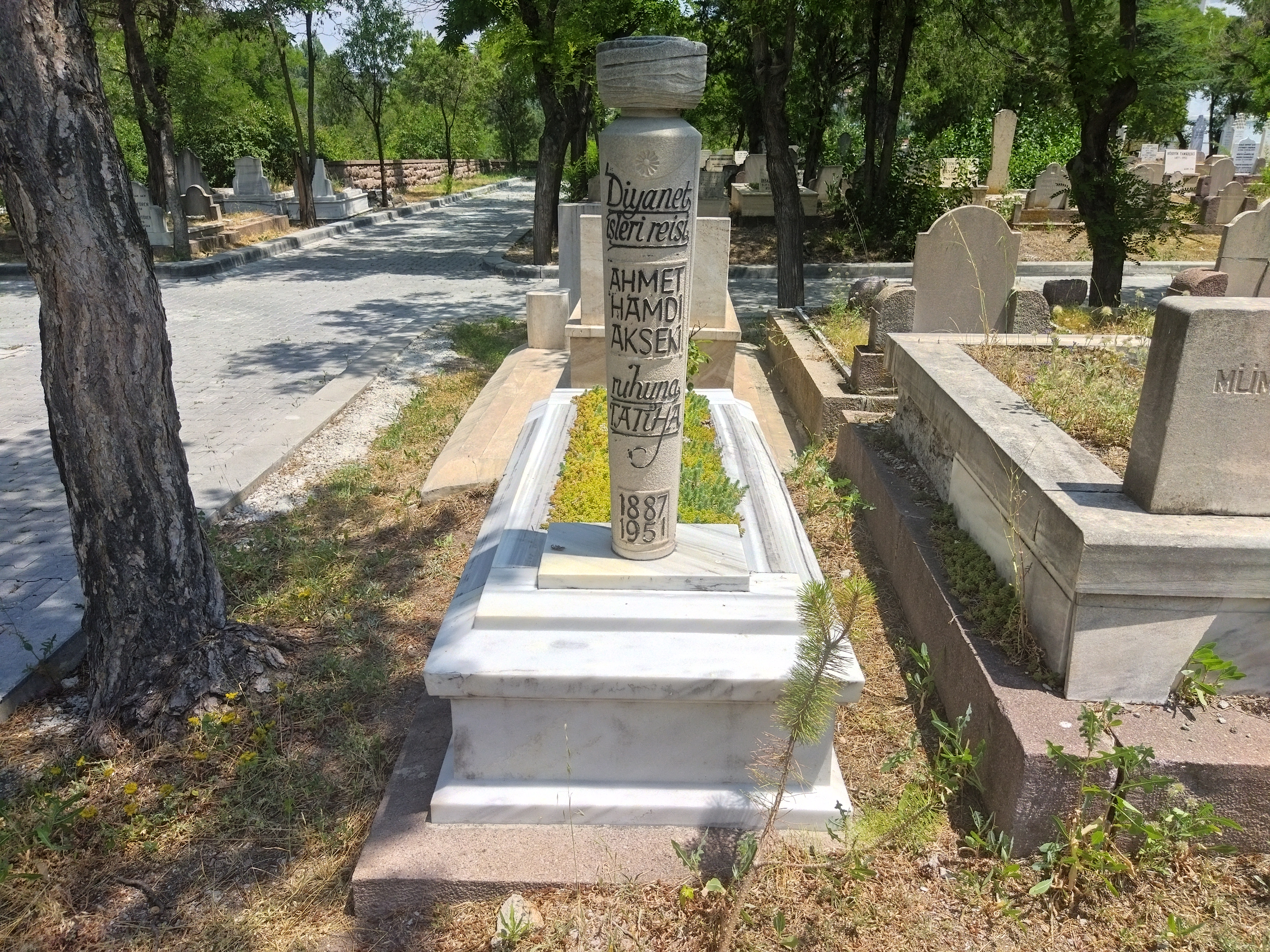
Grave of Ahmet Hamdi Akseki in Cebeci Asri Cemetery, Ankara

Akseki was born in 1886 in Antalya Province. He both studied and taught at various Madrasas and became an Islamic cleric. Mehmet Rifat Börekçi appointed him as the Vice President of the Directorate of Religious Affairs in 1939, and he remained at the post until the death of Mehmet Şerefettin Yaltkaya, when he took the position of Minister.
