= Hasan Hüsnü Erdem =

Turkish Mufti

President of the Directorate of Religious Affairs
- In office 6 April 1961 – 13 October 1964
- President: Cemal Gürsel (acting until 10 October 1961)
- Preceded by: Ömer Nasuhi Bilmen
- Succeeded by: Mehmet Tevfik Gerçeker

Personal details
- Born: 8 July 1889 Sadıkler Village, Akseki, Antalya
- Died: 22 August 1974 (aged 85)

Hasan Hüsnü Erdem (8 July 1889 – 22 August 1974) was a Turkish scholar, teacher, and Mufti who served as the sixth president of the Turkish Directorate of Religious Affairs from 1961 to 1964.

== Biography ==
In his early life, Erdem learned Arabic from his father, before completing an education in Fiqh. He received a PhD on this topic in 1916 and subsequently taught at many schools and became an Islamic scholar. He retired in 1964.

== Works ==
He also contributed to more than two hundred biographies in the Turkish Encyclopedia of Islam. His writings include:

- Ebedî Risâlet - a translation of Abdul Rahman Azzam's Eternal Message
- Riyâzü’s-sâlihîn ve Tercemesi - on Al-Nawawi's The Meadows of the Righteous
- İlâhî Hadisler - on translation of hadiths
- Berat Gecesi Hakkında Bir Tedkik
