= Nuri Saryal =

Turkish academic (1929–2020)

- Born: September 2, 1929; Baku, Azerbaijan SSR
- Died: December 22, 2020 (aged 91)
- Education: Robert College (BS); Purdue University (MS); TU Berlin (PhD)

Nuri Saryal (2 September 1929 - 22 December 2020) was a Turkish engineer, academic and university administrator of the Azerbaijani and German origin. He served as rector of Middle East Technical University from 1977 to 1979.

== Early life ==
He was born in Baku, Azerbaijan SSR, to Ismail and German Helena (née Hoffmann) Seyitzade. In 1931, he became a Turkish citizen, and the family name was changed to Saryal. He graduated from the Atatürk Gymnasium in Ankara in 1947 and attended an English medium preparatory school from 1947 to 1948. In 1952, he earned a B.Sc. in Mechanical Engineering from Robert College Engineering School. He later pursued graduate studies at Purdue University, where he obtained an M.Sc. in Mechanical Engineering, and completed his Ph.D. in Mechanical Engineering at Technische Universität Berlin in 1956. His doctoral dissertation, titled "Unsteady State Temperature Distribution in Steam Turbine Rotors Using Electrical Analogy," resulted in a patent by AEG Company, which financed his research. From 1956 to 1957, he served as a reserve officer at the General Staff's Technical Research and Development Center.

== Career ==
From 1958 to 1962, he served as chief engineer at a private company, overseeing the construction of electrical and electronic utilities for five NATO airbases. In 1962, he joined the Mechanical Engineering Department of the Middle East Technical University (METU) as an assistant professor. Between 1963 and 1965, he chaired the department and served as Assistant to the President of METU from 1964 to 1969. In 1966, he became an associate professor, with his habilitation focusing on "Determination of (Unsteady State) Thermal Stresses Through Electrical Analogy."

From 1970 to 1972, he was an Alexander von Humboldt Fellow and visiting professor at the Technical University of Munich, where his lectures on "Elektrische Analogiemethoden für Wärmeübertragungs- und Wärmespannungsprobleme" were published. He returned to METU and became a full professor in 1975. From 1977 to 1979, he served as Rector of METU.

In 1979, he lectured for three months at the University of Stuttgart and, from 1979 to 1980, at the Technical University of Munich on the Electrical Analogy of Heat Transfer and Mechanical Systems. He returned to METU, where he remained from 1980 until his retirement in 1996, when he became an Emeritus Professor.

In 1992, he was awarded Das Grosse Verdienstkreuz des Verdienstordens der Bundesrepublik Deutschland (English: The Grand Cross of the Order of Merit of the Federal Republic of Germany). Afterward, he continued his research on "Electrical Simulation of Compressible Fluid Flow" and developed a drift-free, highly stable analog integrator suitable for hybrid analog-digital computation of scientific phenomena.

== Memberships ==
- From 1962 to 2004, he was a member of the Turkish-German Cultural Advisory Board (German: Turkisch-Deutscher Kulturbeirat) and served as President of the Board at the Goethe-Institut in Ankara from 1998 to 2003.
- Between 1981 and 1993, he was the President of the Turkish Society for Heat and Mass Transfer.
- In 1982, he became a founding member of the Alexander von Humboldt Club in Ankara. In 2000, he assumed the presidency of the club.
