= Sicilian Questions =

13th-century philosophical work by Ibn Sab'in

Sicilian Questions (المسائل الصقلية, al-Masāʼil al-Ṣiqilliyya, in Arabic) is a 13th-century philosophical work by Ibn Sab'in. It contains the answer given by him to some philosophical questions raised by the Frederick II of Hohenstaufen and has been defined as "symbol on the intellectual relations between medieval Christian Europe and the Islamic world".

On the Sicilian Questions exist, so far, the complete editions of Şerefettin Yaltkaya, according to the 534th Arabic manuscript from the Bodleian Library at Oxford; and several complete translations: to Turkish, to Italian, and to Spanish; as well as diverse partial translations: to French, Spanish and German.

Regarding the author's style, the book has obvious signs of eloquence and elegance, as well as extensive scientific knowledge. But at the same time, it warns, sometimes, a certain monotony, excessive rhetoric, with consequent abrupt interruptions retakes, disjunctions, etc.

== Structure ==
The treatise is divided into a prologue, written perhaps by one of his disciples, which explains the origin of the correspondence, the answer to the four philosophical questions raised by Frederick II of Hohenstaufen, an Appendix referred to several issues, and finally, an epilogue. These parts are of variable length and are subdivided, in turn, into several sections. Given, then, that its structure is as follows:

- A. Preface of the work
  - 1. Question I: On the eternity of the world
  - 1.1. On the framing of the question
  - 1.2. The terms of the issue
  - 1.2.1. The world
  - 1.2.2. Eternity
  - 1.2.3. Innovation
  - 1.2.4. Creating
  - 1.2.5. The invention
  - 1.3. Controversy of opinions
  - 1.4. Aristotle's philosophical way
  - 1.5. Displayed on the eternity of the world (11 shows)
  - 1.6. Several theories about the eternity of the world: Asharites Ibn Al-Sa'ig, Peripatetics, Ibn Sina, Mutazilites.
  - 1.7. The innovation of the world according to Ibn Sab'in.
  - 1.8. Epilogue of the matter.
  - 2. Question II: On the Divine Science
  - 2.1. The aim of the divine knowledge
  - 2.1.2. The Ancients
  - 2.1.3. The Sufis
  - 2.1.4. The Greeks
  - 2.2. The premises of the divine knowledge
  - 2.2.1. On the framing of the question
  - 2.2.2. The premises according to the ancients
  - 2.2.3. The art of logic
  - 2.2.3.1. Logic parts (8 parts)
  - 2.2.3.2. Types of premises (13 types)
  - 2.2.3.3. The states of the premises (5 states). Syllogisms
  - 2.3. The soul
  - 2.4. The intellect
  - 2.5. The parts of philosophy (science)
  - 2.6. The premises of the divine knowledge
  - 2.6.1. The conditions required for the divine knowledge according to the ancients
  - 2.6.2. The conditions required for the divine knowledge according to the Sufis
  - 2.7. The way of Walker (The proficient on the way to God)
  - 2.8. Some considerations on the conditions required by the object
  - 2.9. The end of divine knowledge
  - 3. Question III: On the categories
  - 3.1. On the framing of the question
  - 3.2. Explanation of category
  - 3.3. Branch of the categories
  - 4. Question IV: On the Soul
  - 4.1. On the framing of the question
  - 4.2. The types of soul
  - 4.2.1. The vegetative soul
  - 4.2.2. The animal soul
  - 4.2.3. Various theories about the soul: ancient brahmans, followers of the metempsychosis, that of Ibn Sab'in and others
  - 4.2.4. The rational soul
  - 4.2.4.1. The immortality of the rational soul
  - 4.2.4.2. Demonstrations of the immortality of the soul (8 shows)
  - 4.2.4.3. Commentary on the demonstrations
  - 4.2.4.4. Some theories of the intellect
- B. Appendix: Questions more
  - B.1. Comment of the term 'right'
  - B.2. Review of the word 'eye'
  - B.3. On the dual of the terms 'eye' and 'hand'
  - B.4. Comment of the term 'hand'. Explanation of the hadith "The heart of the believer is between two fingers of the Merciful"
  - B.5. Outline of the controversy of Alexander of Aphrodisias to Aristotle
- C. Epilogue of the work

As usual in medieval Arabic treatises, and how could it be otherwise, if we take into account the rich and highly educated of Ibn Sab'in, in the Sicilian Questions the author quotes from other writers, especially those in the classical antiquity; among them are, for example, Plato's Phaedrus and especially those belonging to the logic of Aristotle, as the most relevant. Similarly, and for the same reason, it makes frequent references to ancient philosophers and thinkers to a greater extent, but also to his fellow followers of other faiths and representatives of the most varied theories and doctrines, explained or simply commented on the work, which make it a rich melting pot of scientific knowledge to justify the time and interest in it. Among all these philosophers, he notes, the volume of citations is made on his thought and his writings, Aristotle, which is really central to the treaty and the Andalusian mystic most often named as the Wise (al-Hakim) and the Man (al-Rayul).

Other important philosophers and thinkers in the Sicilian Questions referred to are, in alphabetical order, Alexander of Aphrodisias, Anaxagoras, Berossus, Crates, Diogenes, Euclid, al-Farabi, Galen, al-Ghazali, al-Hallaj, Ibn Bajja (Avempace), Ibn Sina (Avicenna), Iamblichus, Parmenides, Pythagoras, Plato, Socrates, Themistius, Theophrastus and Zeno of Elea.

The character of the work lies at the confluence of all these philosophical currents and beliefs.
