= Ibn Sab'in =

13th-century Muslim philosopher

Abd al-Haqq ibn Sabʿin al-Mursi
- Born: 1216/1217 CE; Murcia
- Died: March 21, 1271 CE (9 Shawwal 669 AH); Mecca

Philosophical work
- School: Founder of the Sab'iniyya
- Main interests: Sufism and philosophy
- Notable works: Sicilian Questions

Ibn Sab'in (Arabic: محمدبن عبدالحق بن سبعين ʿAbd al-Ḥaqq b. Sabʿīn al-Mursī) was an Arab Sufi, philosopher from al-Andalus in the west land of Islamic world. He was born in 1217 in modern-day Ricote in Murcia. It has been suggested that he was a Neoplatonic philosopher, a Peripatetic philosopher, a Pythagorean philosopher, a Hermeticist, an alchemist, a heterodox Sufi, a pantheist, though none of these adequately characterise Ibn Sab'in. He was also known for his knowledge of esotericism and was well versed in the knowledge of Islam and of other religions.

From his time and continuing through to today, Ibn Sabʿīn has been criticized for his views, though often by detractors who did so without an in-depth knowledge of his works, as many of the accusations against Ibn Sabʿīn are invalidated by Ibn Sabʿīn’s own writings, and suggest that some of our author’s critics were not even familiar with his works.

== The Sicilian Questions ==
Ibn Sabʿīn is most famously remembered for his replies to the questions sent to him by Frederick II, Holy Roman Emperor and published as الكلام على المسائل الصقلية al-Kalam 'ala al-Masa'il as-Siqiliya (Discourse on the Sicilian Questions) which were first popularised in the West in 1853 by Sicilian Orientalist Michele Amari who recognised Ibn Sab'in as the author, among others, of the responses to the Sicilian Questions.

== Works ==
In addition to the Sicilian Question, his other major work and longest is بد العارف Budd al-Arif (The Essential of the Gnostic), which is extant in manuscript and an edited version. His writing style has been described as composite and cryptic, which some of the modern publishers had difficulty understanding. He authored a number of epistles and books, some of which have been published by Abderrahman Badawi among others.

== Criticism of Averroes ==
In his work Bud al-'Arif (The Essential of the Gnostic), Ibn Sab'in virulently criticized Averroes and considered him a fanatic Aristotelian who always sought to validate Aristotle's ideas even when they were absurd. In this work, Ibn Sab'in states:

وهذا الرجل بن رشد مفتون بارسط ومعظم له ويكاد أن يقلده في الحس والمعقولات الأولى. ولو سمع الحكيم يقول إن القائم قاعد في زمان واحد لقال به وإعتقده. واكثر تواليفه من كلام ارسط إما يلخصها أو يمشي معها. وهو في نفسه قصير الباع قليل المباع بليد التصور غير مدرك, غير أنه إنسان جيد وقليل الفضول ومنصف وعالم بعجزه. ولا يعول عليه في إجتهاده فإنه مقلد لأرسط.
And this man, Ibn Rushd, is a fanatic of Aristotle and his glorifier and would almost imitate him in the senses and the first intelligibles, and if he hears the philosopher saying that the standing is sitting at the same time, he would believe in it and assert it. And most of his writings are from the words of Aristotle, either summarizing it or validating it. And he is in his spirit short in breadth, scant in offering, of primitive conceptualization, and incognizant. However, he is a man of quality and of little meddlesomeness, and he is fair and aware of his shortcomings. He cannot be relied upon in his exegesis for he is an imitator of Aristotle.

== Death ==
In approximately 668/1270 Ibn Sabʿīn died in Mecca, under suspicious circumstances. There are two descriptions of his death, one that states that he was poisoned and another that reports that he committed suicide. However there is evidence indicating that the story of Ibn Sabʿīn’s suicide was fabricated. Casewit states that “his alleged suicide seems untenable firstly because it was related by one of Ibn Sabʿīn’s foes, and secondly because suicide is wholly contrary to both Islamic law and Ibn Sabʿīn’s philosophical beliefs.” Despite the mutually exclusive versions, it is the more controversial suicide adopted by Massignon and Corbin that is repeatedly stated, and even fictionalised by Bensalem Himmich in A Muslim Suicide.
