= Ömer Nasuhi Bilmen =

Muslim scholar

President of the Directorate of Religious Affairs
- In office 30 June 1960 – 6 April 1961
- President: Cemal Gürsel (acting)
- Preceded by: Eyüp Sabri Hayırlıoğlu
- Succeeded by: Hasan Hüsnü Erdem

Personal details
- Born: Omar Nasuhi (عُمر نصوحى); 1883 Erzurum, Erzurum Vilayet, Ottoman Empire
- Died: 12 October 1971 (aged 87–88) Ankara, Turkey

Ömer Nasuhi Bilmen (1883–1971) was a Muslim scholar of fiqh and tafsir, and the fifth president of the Directorate of Religious Affairs of the Republic of Turkey. He is known for his expansive work on a concise manual on Islamic faith, worship and ethics called The Big Book of Islamic Catechism (Büyük İslâm İlmihali).

== Early life and education ==
Bilmen was born in Erzurum, Ottoman Empire in 1883 (Rabi ul-Awwal 1300 Hijri, 1299 Rumi). His father was Haji Ahmed Efendi and his mother was Muhîbe Hanim. Upon his father's death when he was a child, he was raised under the patronage of his uncle Abdürrezzak İlmî Efendi at the Erzurum Ahmediyye Madrasa. He studied under his uncle and the mufti of Erzurum, Narmanlı Hüseyin Efendi. When his two teachers died at close intervals, he moved to Istanbul in 1908 and in 1909 started attending the classes of Tokatlı Şâkir Efendi, one of the Fatih Mosque lecturers. In addition, he passed the exam of Attorney General in 1912 and graduated from the School of Judges (Medreset ul-Kudât) he was attending in 1913.

Ömer Nasuhi Bilmen knew Arabic and Persian, and together with Turkish wrote poetry in three languages. He also had a curiosity for French and learned enough to translate it.

== Major works ==
Bilmen's major works are the following:

- Hukūk-ı İslâmiyye ve Istılâhât-ı Fıkhiyye Kāmûsu
- Büyük İslâm İlmihali
- Kur’ân-ı Kerîm’in Türkçe Meâl-i Âlîsi ve Tefsiri (I-VIII, Istanbul 1963-1966)
- Büyük Tefsir Tarihi (I-II, Ankara 1955-1961)
- Kur’ân-ı Kerîm’den Dersler ve Öğütler (Istanbul 1947)
- Sûre-i Fethin Türkçe Tefsiri İ‘tilâ-yı İslâm ile İstanbul Tarihçesi (Istanbul 1953, 1972)
- Hikmet Goncaları. 500 hadisin tercüme ve izahını ihtiva etmektedir (Istanbul 1963)
- Muvazzah İlm-i Kelâm (Istanbul 1955)
- Mülehhas İlm-i Tevhid Akaid-i İslâmiye (Istanbul 1962, 1973)
- Yüksek İslâm Ahlâkı (Istanbul 1949, 1964)
- Dinî Bilgiler (Ankara 1959)

Bilmen had his essays published in Beyânülhak, Sırât-ı Müstakîm ve Sebîlürreşâd magazines, published a poetry book titled Nüzhetü’l Ervâh (Istanbul 1968) which he wrote in Persian and translated to Turkish, and published a novel, İki Şükûfe-i Taaşşuk (1904).
