= Ahmet Hamdi Akseki Mosque =

Mosque in Ankara, Turkey

Coordinates: 39.9064°N 32.7632°E

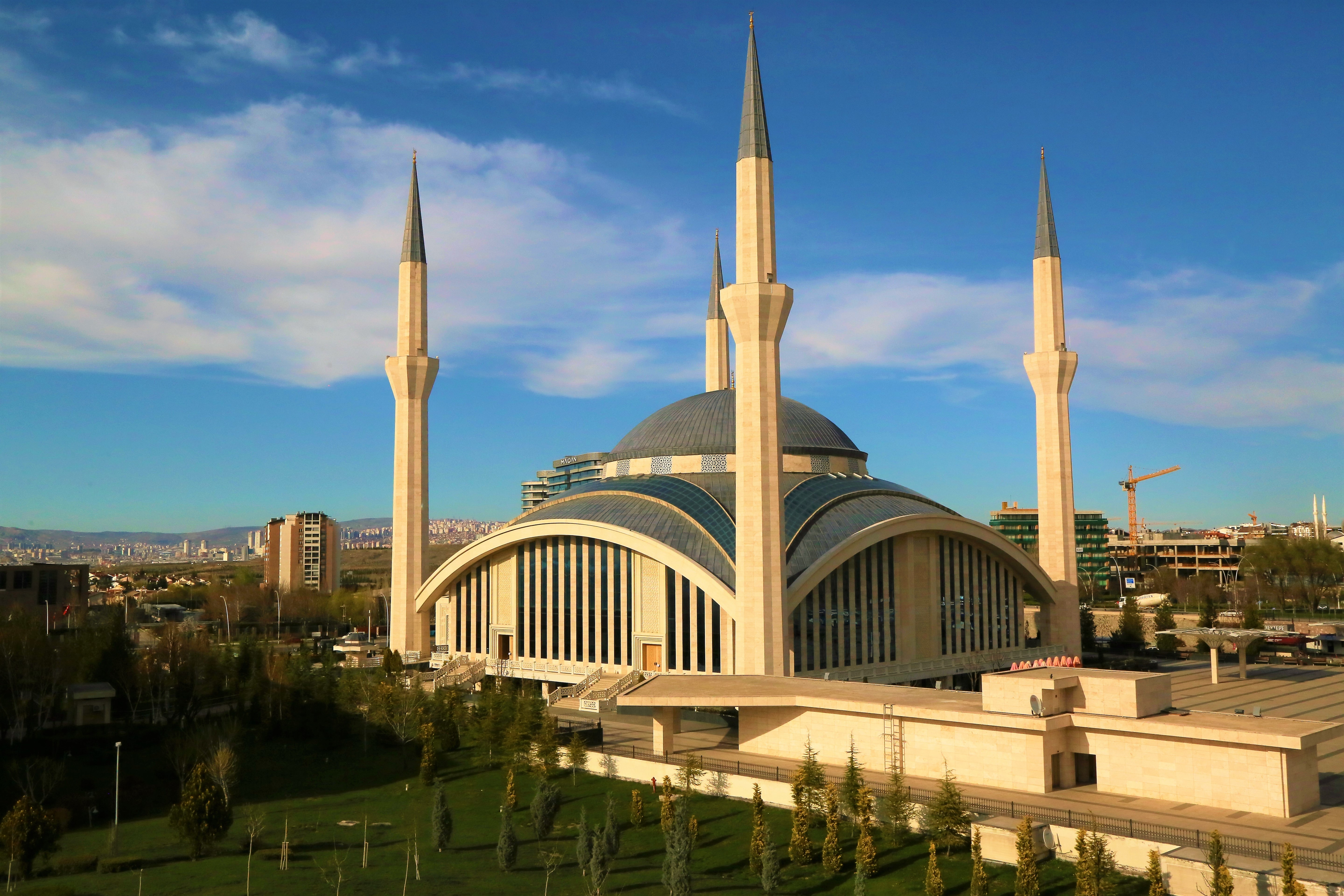

Religion
- Affiliation: Islam

Location
- Location: Ankara, Turkey
- Interactive map of Ahmet Hamdi Akseki Mosque

Specifications
- Dome: 1
- Minaret: 4
- Minaret height: 66 metres

The Ahmet Hamdi Akseki Mosque is a mosque in Ankara, Turkey. The mosque is among the largest in Turkey.

== History ==
The foundations were laid in 2008 and construction of the mosque began in 2009.

The mosque was inaugurated on April 19, 2013, with a ceremony attended by then Prime Minister Recep Tayyip Erdoğan. It was named after Ahmet Hamdi Akseki, a religious scholar and former president of the Directorate of Religious Affairs.

Ahmet Hamdi Akseki, after whom the mosque is named, was a respected figure, known for his contributions to Islamic scholarship and his efforts in the field of education and religious affairs.

== Architecture ==
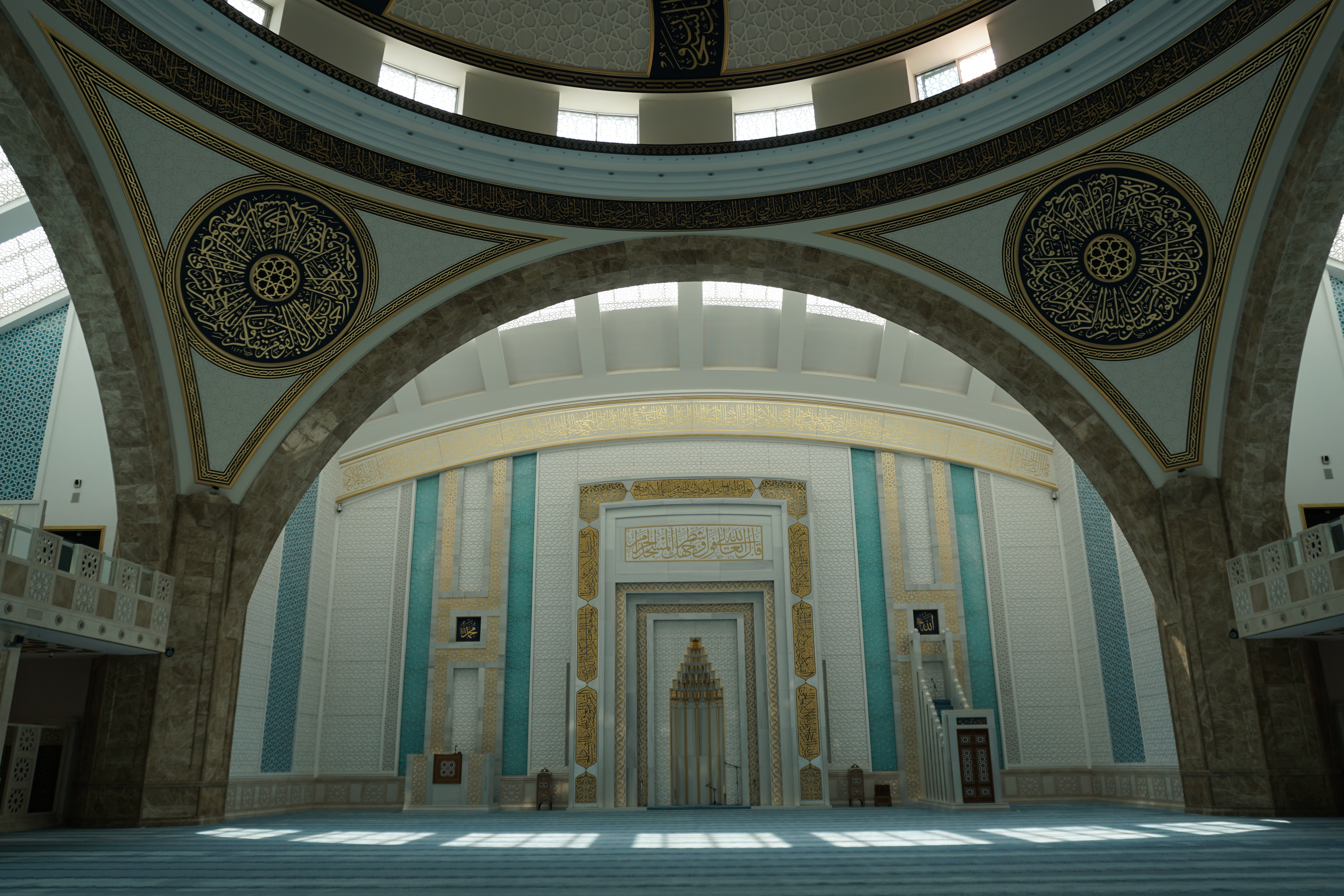
Interior of the mosque

The mosque consists of four minarets, each 66 m tall, and a dome with a diameter of 30 m.

=== Interior ===
The mosque interior consists of traditional architectural elements. Contrary to what is generally seen, there is no chandelier.
