= Mehmet Tevfik Gerçeker =

Turkish scholar of Islam

President of the Directorate of Religious Affairs
- In office 15 October 1964 – 16 December 1965
- Preceded by: Hasan Hüsnü Erdem
- Succeeded by: İbrahim Bedreddin Elmalılı

Personal details
- Born: Mehmed Tawfiq; 1898 Bursa Province, Ottoman Empire
- Died: 28 January 1982 (aged 83–84) Ankara, Turkey

Mehmet Tevfik Gerçeker (born Mehmed Tawfiq; 1898 – 28 January 1982) was a Turkish scholar.

== Biography ==
In his hometown, he studied religion and astronomy for his education. After this period, he moved to Istanbul where he completed higher education in a Madrasah. He was a founding member of the Turkish Directorate of Religious Affairs, and served at a high position in that department. He then served as Deputy Head of the Council of State from 1952 until his retirement in 1963. He was appointed President of the Directorate of Religious Affairs in 1964.
