= Gazi Yaşargil =

Turkish neurosurgeon (1925–2025)

Mahmut Gazi Yaşargil
- Born: 6 July 1925; Lice, Diyarbakır, Turkey
- Died: 10 June 2025 (aged 99); Stäfa, Canton of Zurich, Switzerland
- Education: University of Jena; University of Basel
- Years active: Surgical field (1950–2009); Professor of Neurosurgical Anatomy (1950–?)
- Known for: Founding of Microneurosurgery
- Medical career
- Profession: Neurosurgeon
- Institutions: University of Vermont; University of Zurich; University of Arkansas for Medical Sciences; Istanbul University
- Sub-specialties: Neurosurgery Microneurosurgery Neuroanatomy
- Research: Microvascular surgery Cerebrovascular disease
- Awards: Marcel Benoist Prize (1975) State Medal of Distinguished Service (2000)

Mahmut Gazi Yaşargil (6 July 1925 – 10 June 2025) was a Turkish-Swiss medical scientist and neurosurgeon. He collaborated with Raymond M. P. Donaghy M.D at the University of Vermont in developing microneurosurgery. Yaşargil treated epilepsy and brain tumours with instruments of his own design. From 1953 until his retirement in 1993, he was first resident, chief resident and then professor and chairman of the Department of Neurosurgery, University of Zurich and the Zurich University Hospital. In 1999, he was honored as "Neurosurgery’s Man of the Century 1950–1999" at the Congress of Neurological Surgeons Annual Meeting. He was a founding member of Eurasian Academy.

== Life and career ==
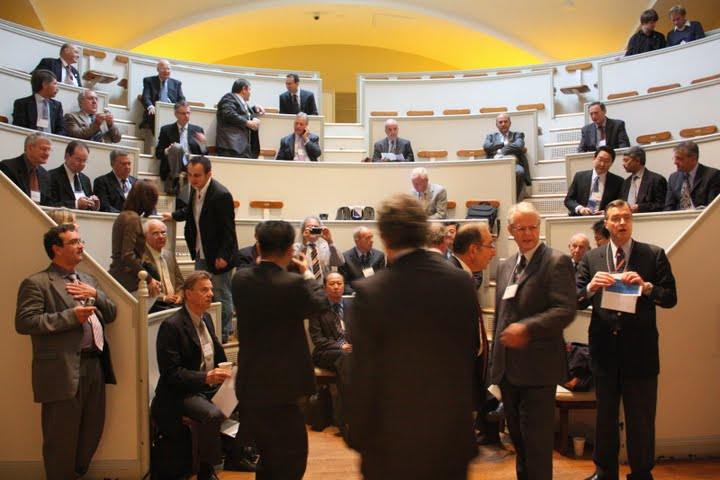
Yaşargil at the Ether Dome

He was born in Lice, Turkey. After attending Ankara Atatürk Lisesi and Ankara University between 1931 and 1943, he went to Germany to study medicine at the Friedrich Schiller University of Jena, Germany. In 1945 he joined the University of Basel where he received a doctorate in 1950. His genius in developing microsurgical techniques for use in cerebrovascular neurosurgery transformed the outcomes of patients with conditions that were previously inoperable. In 1969, Yaşargil became associate professor and in 1973 professor and chairman of the Department of Neurosurgery, University of Zurich succeeding his mentor, Prof. Krayenbuhl. Over the next 20 years, he carried out laboratory work and clinical applications of micro techniques, performing 7500 intracranial operations in Zurich until his retirement in 1993. In 1994, Yaşargil accepted an appointment as Professor of Neurosurgery at the College of Medicine, University of Arkansas for Medical Sciences in Little Rock where he was active in the practice of micro-neurosurgery, research, and teaching.

Together with Harvey Cushing, Yaşargil is hailed as one of the greatest neurosurgeons of the twentieth century. In the micro-neurosurgical anatomical laboratory in Zurich, he trained around 3000 colleagues from all continents and representing all surgical specialties. He participated in several hundred national and international neurosurgical congresses, symposia, and courses as an invited guest.

Yaşargil was married to Dianne Bader-Gibson Yaşargil, who was the nurse in charge of the operating suite by his side since 1973. He died on 10 June 2025, at the age of 99, in his home in Stäfa, Switzerland.

== Publications ==
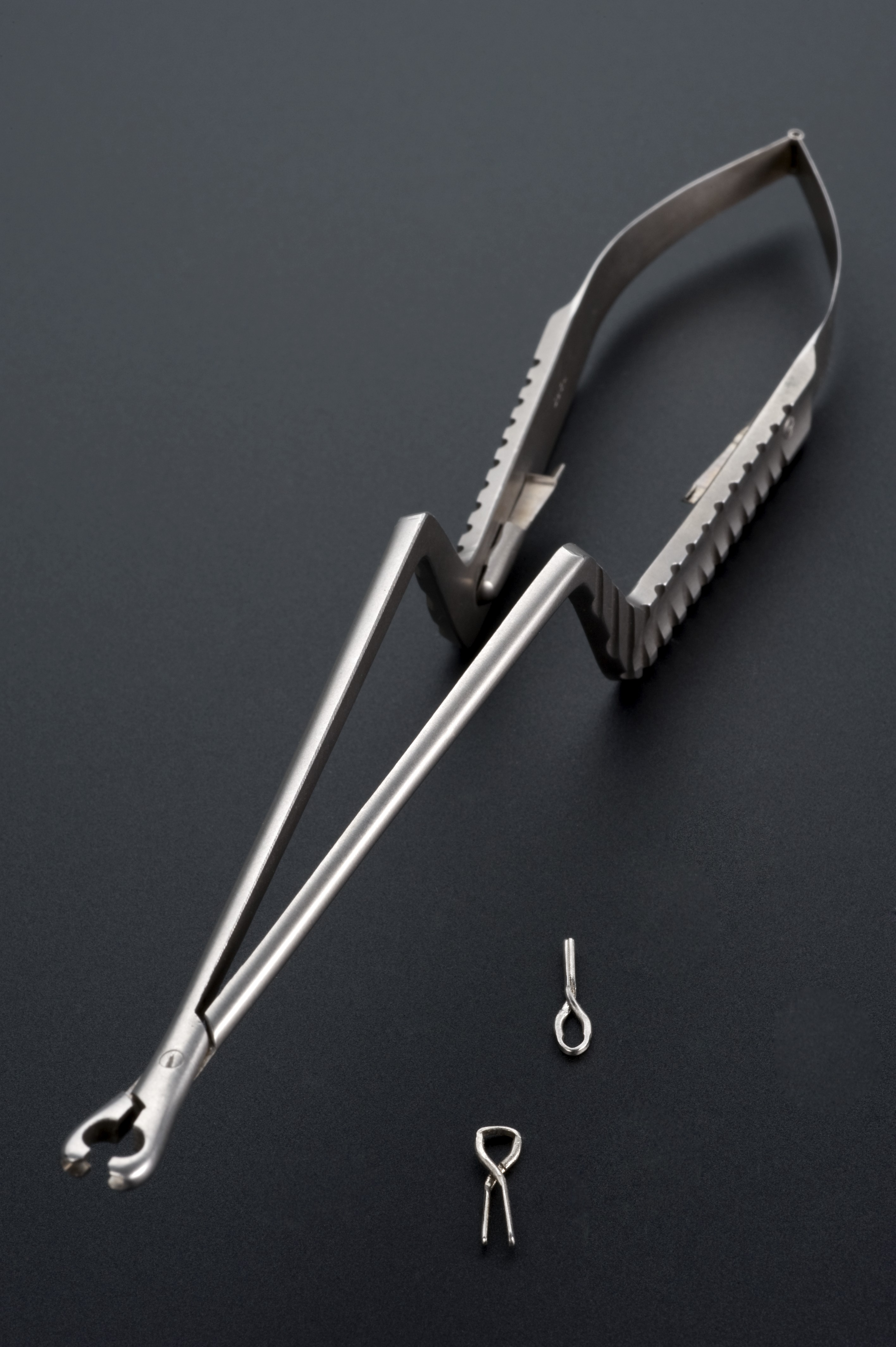
Yasargil clips with their compression forceps. This kind of metallic clips were developed by Yaşargil and are still used during neurosurgery to help treat aneurysms.

Yaşargil published his surgical experiences in 330 papers and 13 monographs. The six-volume publication Microneurosurgery (1984–1996, Georg Thieme Verlag Stuttgart & New York) is the comprehensive review of his broad experiences and a major contribution to the neurosurgery literature.

== Membership ==
- President of the Neurosurgical Society of Switzerland (1973–1975)

== Awards ==
- Marcel Benoist Prize (1975)
- State Medal of Distinguished Service (2000)

== Other Achievements ==
In 2022, Yaşargil was featured on a Posta ve Telgraf Teşkilatı postage stamp.
