= Beynam, Bala =

Beynam
- Neighbourhood
- Location in Turkey Beynam (Turkey Central Anatolia)
- Coordinates: 39°41′N 32°54′E
- Country: Turkey
- Province: Ankara
- District: Bala
- Population (2022): 767
- Time zone: UTC+3 (TRT)

Beynam is a neighbourhood in the municipality and district of Bala, Ankara Province, Turkey. Its population is 767 (2022).
