= Eyüp Sabri Hayırlıoğlu =

Turkish politician and lawyer (1887–1960)

Member of the Grand National Assembly of Turkey
- In office 1923–Unknown (Note: Sometime before 1927.)

President of the Directorate of Religious Affairs
- In office 17 October 1951 – 10 June 1960
- President: Celâl Bayar, Cemal Gürsel (acting)
- Preceded by: Ahmet Hamdi Akseki
- Succeeded by: Ömer Nasuhi Bilmen

Personal details
- Born: Eyüb Sabri; 1 January 1887
- Died: 8 October 1960 (aged 73)

Eyüp Sabri Hayırlıoğlu, born Eyüb Sabri (Ottoman Turkish: ایوب صبری; 1 January 1887 – 8 October 1960) was a Turkish politician and lawyer.
