= Ankara Atatürk High School =

- Ankara Atatürk Lisesi
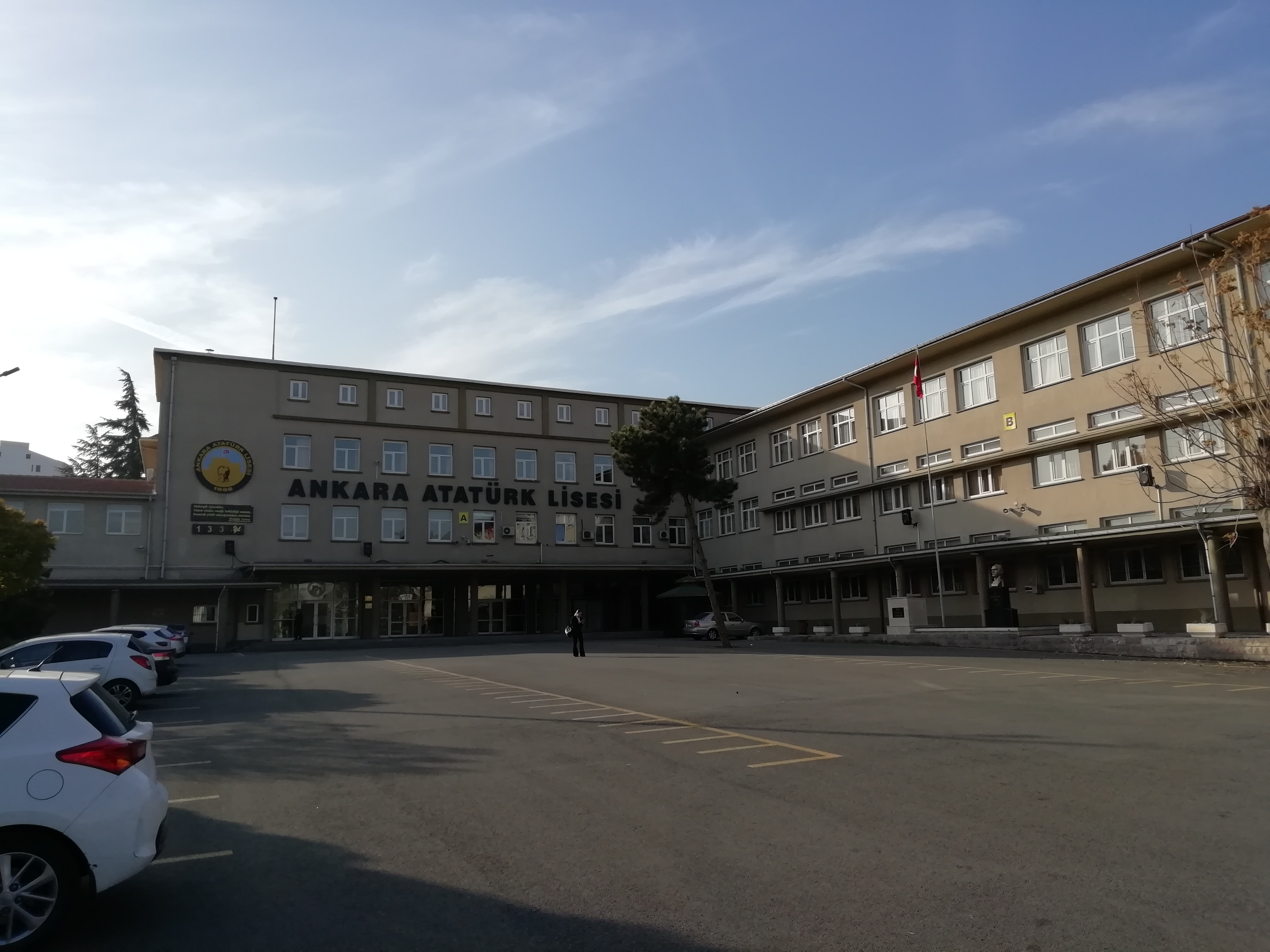
- A view of Ankara Ataürk High School

Location
- Çankaya, Ankara; Turkey; 39.926757°N 32.851517°E

Information
- Former names: Taş Mektep; Ankara İdadisi; Ankara Sultanisi; Ankara Erkek Lisesi; Ankara Atatürk Lisesi
- Type: Public
- Motto: Dünya Dillerini Buluşturan Lise (The High School that Brings Together the Languages of the World)
- Established: 1886; 140 years ago
- CEEB code: 696075
- Principal: Adil Yaman
- Language: Turkish; English; German; French; Spanish; Chinese; Russian; Arabic
- Website: ankaraataturklisesi.meb.k12.tr

Ankara Atatürk High School (Turkish: Ankara Atatürk Lisesi) is a public co-educational Anatolian high school located near the Sıhhiye district of Çankaya, Ankara.

== History ==
The school, originally known as Taş Mektep has a storied history that includes several relocations and transformations. It was first established following an order by Ankara's governor, Sırrı Bey, in 1886. The building was completed in 1889 and initially functioned as an idadi, later upgraded to a sultani in 1908.

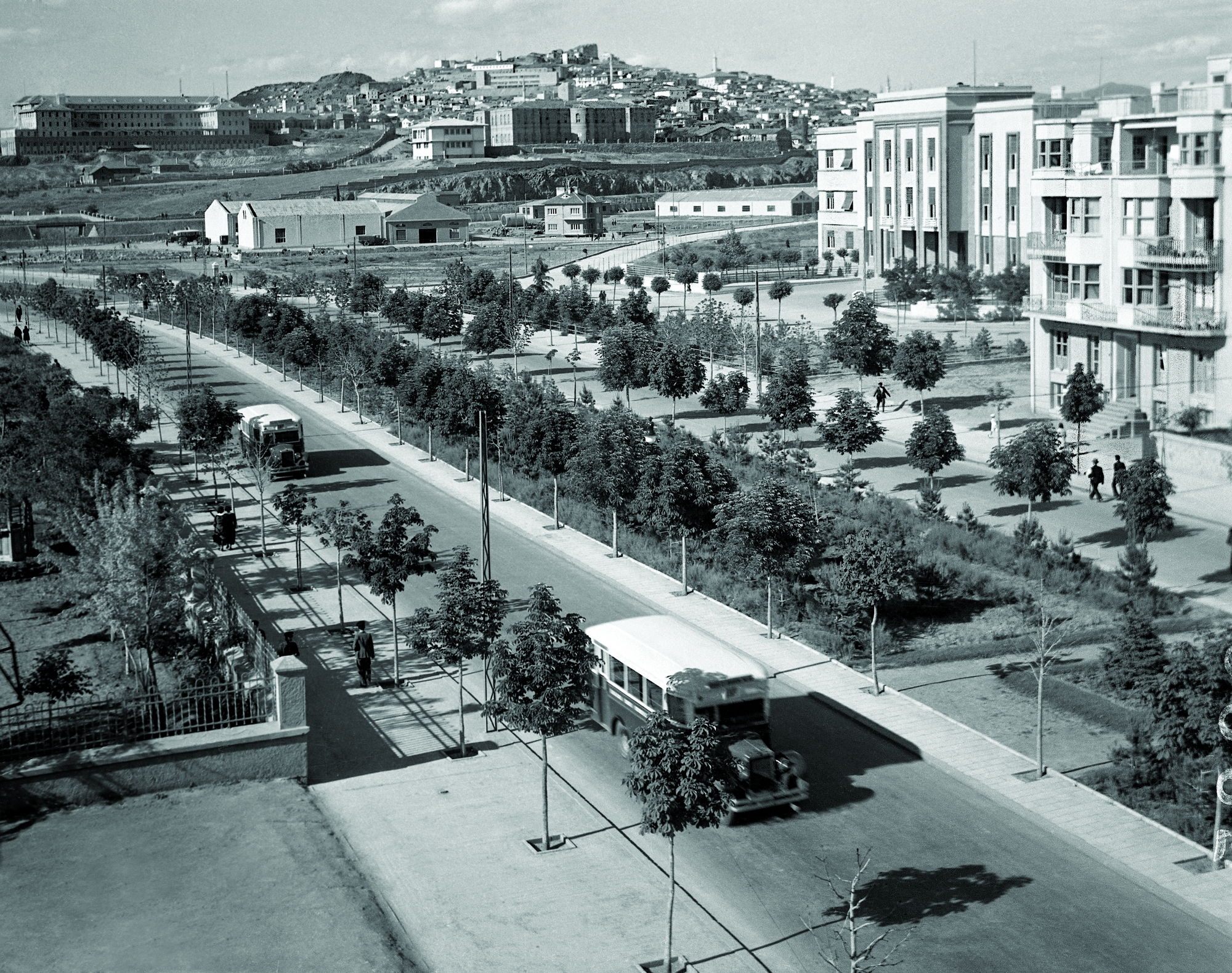
Ankara High School for Boys (Turkish: Ankara Erkek Lisesi)

The institution underwent significant changes during the National Struggle, temporarily relocating to Kayseri in 1921 before returning to Ankara in 1922. Both teachers and students participated in the battles of the National Struggle, earning accolades for their valor. In recognition of their efforts, Mustafa Kemal Atatürk personally awarded the school a crescent and star-adorned flag, now housed in the school's 75th Year Education Museum.

Following the implementation of the Tevhid-i Tedrisat Law on March 3, 1924, the school's name was changed to Ankara Erkek Lisesi (English: Ankara High School for Boys). In 1933, Atatürk visited the school, attending exams and signing a report card. The school was proposed to be renamed Atatürk Lisesi (English: Atatürk High School) during a meeting in 1938, a change that Atatürk approved.

In 1937–38, the school underwent a significant rebuild by German architects Bruno Taut and Franz Hillinger, marking a new architectural era for the institution. The building moved to its new current location in 1940, subsequently expanded with additional facilities.

In the 1940s, the Republic of Turkey made substantial efforts to deepen its cultural engagement with classical antiquity. Ankara Atatürk High School played a significant role in this initiative. During this period, the school started to provide structured education in Latin and Ancient Greek, reflecting a broader national policy to integrate classical studies into the educational curriculum.

== Academics ==
Ankara Atatürk Lisesi stands out among Anatolian high schools in Ankara due to its unique structure that includes a preparatory class and a comprehensive five-year educational program. It is notable for being one of the few schools in Turkey that extends its curriculum beyond the standard four years. The school's educational approach is particularly rigorous in the area of foreign languages; starting from the preparatory class, students engage in learning English as the primary foreign language, supplemented by German, French, Spanish, Russian, and Chinese as secondary languages throughout the five years of study.

Since the 2015-2016 academic year, Ankara Atatürk Lisesi has been designated as one of the select project schools, a recognition that underscores its commitment to advanced and specialized educational practices. This status allows the school to implement innovative teaching methods and curricula designed to enhance the educational experience of its students.

Support for the students at Ankara Atatürk Lisesi is robust, facilitated by the Ankara Atatürk Lisesi Education Foundation (ALEV). ALEV aids students through scholarships, achievement awards, and opportunities for foreign language training abroad. It also provides additional educational support such as language courses offered during the preparatory year and supplementary courses aimed at university preparation. The school also receives logistical support that includes transportation and meals, ensuring that students' basic needs are met so they can focus on their academic pursuits.

== Alumni ==
Ankara Atatürk High School has long been recognized by the local press as an alma mater for Turkish leaders. The school boasts a distinguished list of alumni who have made notable contributions in various fields:

- Ahmet Kurtcebe Alptemoçin — Former Minister of Foreign Affairs
- Altan Öymen — Former Leader of the Republican People's Party
- Aydın Sayılı — Historian of science
- Burhan Doğançay — Turkish-American artist
- Can Dündar — Journalist, former editor-in-chief of Cumhuriyet
- Can Yücel — Poet
- Gazi Yaşargil — Medical scientist and neurosurgeon (AAL Classics Section alumnus)
- Hasan Cemal — Journalist, former editor-in-chief of Cumhuriyet
- Hikmet Çetin — Former Minister of Foreign Affairs and NATO Senior Civilian Representative in Afghanistan
- Hüsamettin Cindoruk — Former Speaker of the Parliament
- İhsan Sabri Çağlayangil — Former President of the Senate of Turkey and Minister of Foreign Affairs
- İlber Ortaylı — Historian and former director of Topkapı Museum
- Korkut Yaltkaya — Neurologist
- Melih Cevdet Anday — Poet and author
- Murat Bardakçı — Journalist
- Münci Kalayoğlu — Physician
- Müşfik Kenter — Actor
- Nuri Saryal — Former rector of the Middle East Technical University
- Orhan Veli — Poet
- Recep Akdağ — Former Minister of Health
- Rüşdü Saracoğlu — Former governor of the Central Bank of the Republic of Turkey
- Sinan Çetin — Film director and producer
- Süha Sevük — Former rector of the Middle East Technical University
- Vehbi Koç — Businessman and industrialist

Ankara Atatürk High School fosters a strong sense of community and continuity through the support of two major alumni organizations. The Ankara Atatürk High School Alumni Association works to maintain connections among former students and actively supports various school activities and initiatives. Complementing this, the Ankara Atatürk Lisesi Education Foundation is committed to enhancing the educational facilities and opportunities at the school. This foundation is instrumental in ensuring the continued success of its students and alumni by providing critical resources and support. Together, these organizations play vital roles in upholding the school's legacy of excellence and community engagement.
