= Death and state funeral of Mustafa Kemal Atatürk =

1938 death of the President of Turkey

Funeral of Mustafa Kemal Atatürk
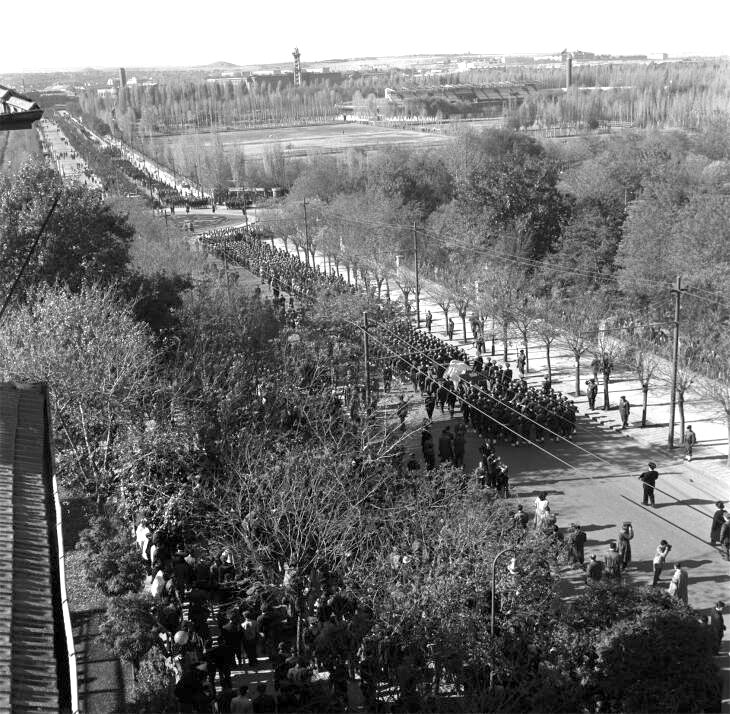
- Mustafa Kemal Atatürk's funeral
- Date: 21 November 1938; 87 years ago
- Location: Ethnography Museum of Ankara
- Outcome: Death of Atatürk

Mustafa Kemal Atatürk, the first president of the Republic of Turkey, died at the Dolmabahçe Palace, his official residence in Istanbul, on 10 November 1938. His state funeral was held in the capital city of Ankara on 21 November, and was attended by dignitaries from seventeen nations. His body remained at the Ethnography Museum of Ankara until 10 November 1953, the fifteenth anniversary of his death, when his remains were carried to his final resting place at Anıtkabir.

== Health and death ==
During 1937, indications of Atatürk's worsening health started to appear. In 1938, while he was on a trip to Yalova, he suffered from a serious illness. After a short period of treatment in Yalova, an apparent improvement in his health was observed, but his condition again worsened following his journeys first to Ankara, and then to Mersin and Adana. Upon his return to Ankara in May, he was recommended to go to İstanbul for treatment, where he was diagnosed with cirrhosis of the liver.

During his stay in İstanbul, he made an effort to keep up with his regular lifestyle for a while, heading the Council of Ministers meeting, working on the Hatay issue, and hosting King Carol II of Romania during his visit in June. He stayed on board his newly arrived yacht, Savarona, until the end of July, after which his health again worsened and then he moved to a room arranged for him at the Dolmabahçe Palace.

Atatürk's death certificate, signed by nine medical professors, officially declared he had died at 09:05 local time on 10 November 1938, in the state residence of Dolmabahçe Palace in Istanbul from his long-lasting illness.

== Services ==
Preparations started for the state funeral of Atatürk organized by the leading officials. However, no decision was made yet for the final resting place. The next day on 11 November, the parliament in Ankara convened and elected İsmet İnönü as the new president.

=== Religious service ===
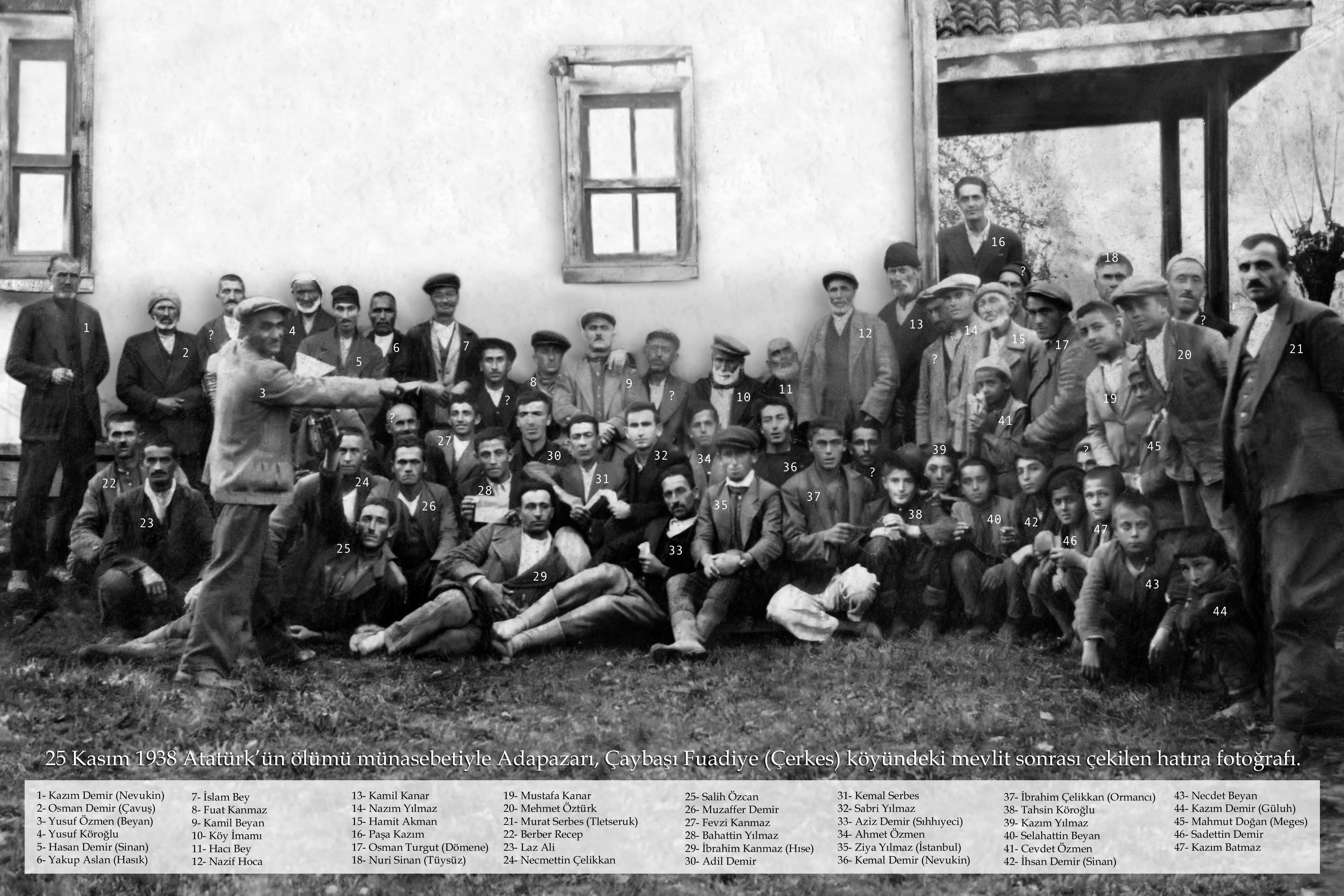
After a mevlid ceremony at Çaybaşı Fuadiye village

No religious funeral service was at first foreseen. However, his sister Makbule Atadan, who stayed at the palace for several days, insisted on a religious funeral service to be held in a mosque, as is normally the case, before her brother's body was transferred to Ankara. She was subsequently convinced by the President of Religious Affairs Rifat Börekçi that an Islamic funeral service may also be held outside of a mosque.

The funeral prayer was conducted at 08:10 local time in the morning of 19 November by Şerefettin Yaltkaya, Director of the Institute for Islamic Studies. During the religious ceremony, photographs were not allowed. The funeral prayer was attended by people who were close to him, some generals, religious officials, palace servants and Hafız Major Yaşar Okur, who served with Atatürk for fifteen years.

=== Catafalque ===
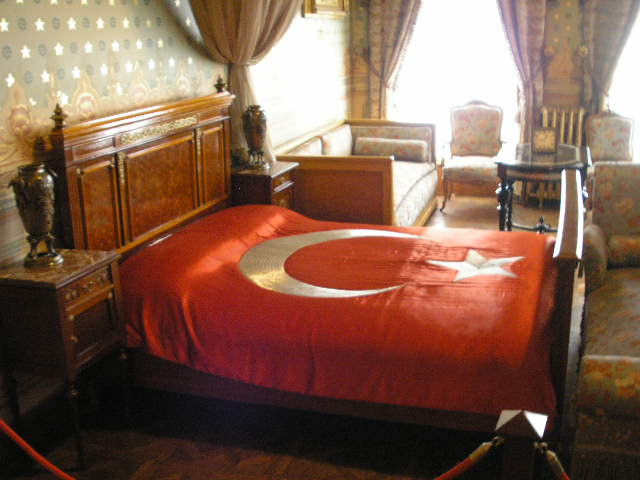
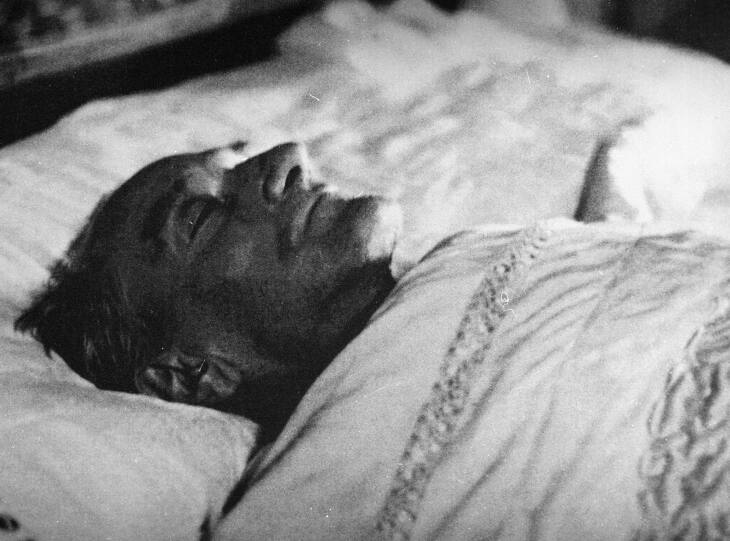
Catafalque

Prof. Mehmet Kâmil Berk, one of the signers of the death certificate, bound Atatürk's jaw with a silk handkerchief and his big toes with a bandage, as per Islamic rites. Since the burial would be delayed, his body was embalmed by pathologist Prof. Lütfi Aksu, who came for this purpose from the Gülhane Military Medical Academy (GMMA) in Ankara. His body then lay in repose while his sister Makbule Atadan, high-ranking government officials and officers, and other influential people came at specified times to pay their respects.

Atatürk's body was put in a zinc-lined mahogany casket of walnut wood. The flag-draped casket was placed on 16 November in the reception hall of the palace on a catafalque. It was flanked by three high torches at each side symbolizing the six pillars of Kemalist ideology and crowned by wreaths for lying in state.

For three days, thousands of mourning people paid their respects passing by the catafalque, where an honor guard of officers stood vigil.

=== Transfer to the capital city ===
Following the funeral prayer, Atatürk's casket was taken out the Dolmabahçe Palace, placed on a horse-drawn caisson and brought in front of a cortege to Gülhane Park. From Seraglio Point, a torpedo boat forwarded it to the battlecruiser TCG Yavuz. Turkish navy ships and foreign vessels escorted TCG Yavuz with Atatürk's casket aboard until off Büyükada. Yavuz carried then Atatürk's body to Izmit.

Subsequently, Atatürk's casket was transferred to a funeral train in Izmit that brought it to Ankara arriving the next day on 20 November. In Ankara, President İsmet İnönü, Speaker of the Parliament Abdülhalik Renda, Prime minister Celal Bayar, government ministers, Chief of the General Staff Marshal Fevzi Çakmak, high-ranked officers and members of the parliament were all present during the arrival of the funeral train in the Ankara Central Station.

== State funeral ==
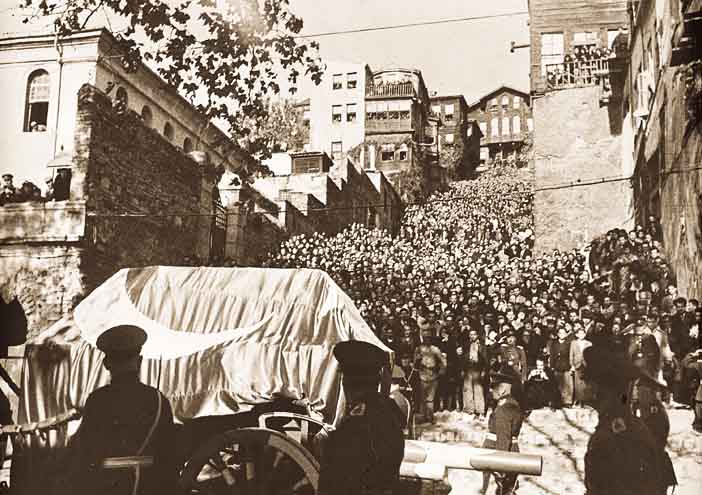
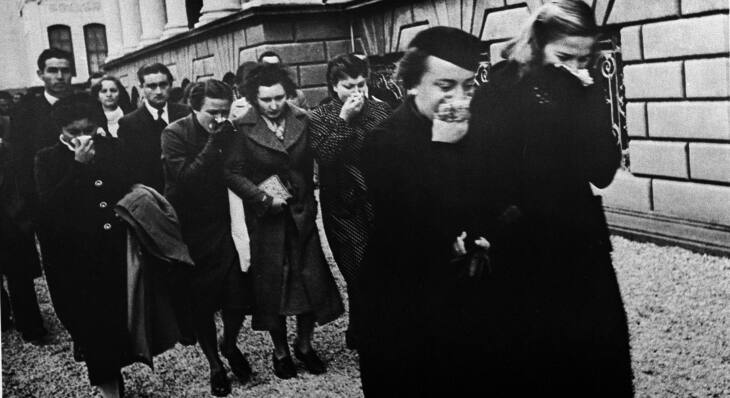
State funeral

Atatürk's casket was brought on a caisson to the building of Turkish Grand National Assembly in Ulus, where it was placed on a catafalque in front of the parliament building for lying in state. Thousands of residents of Ankara paid their respects.

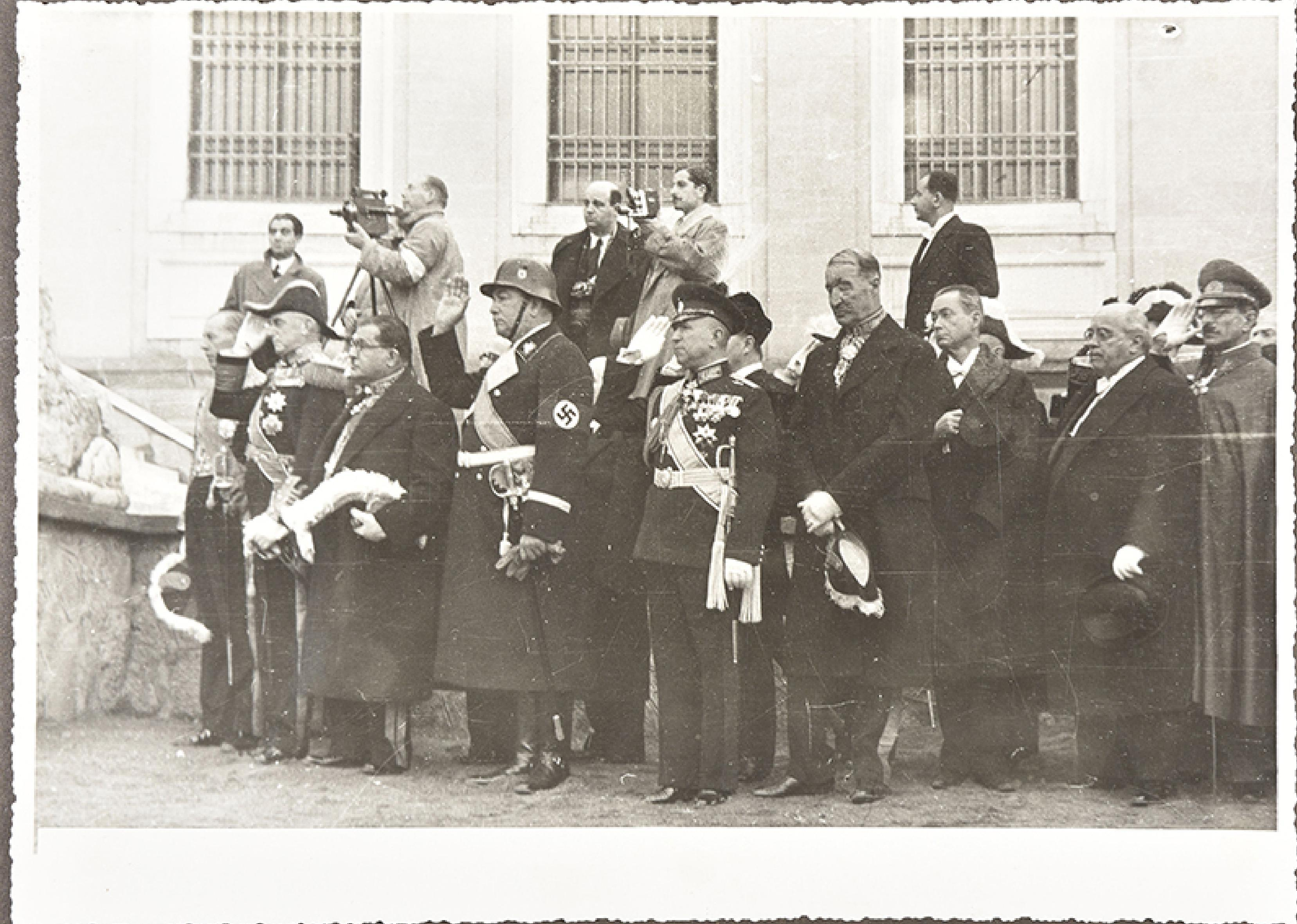
Foreign state officials at the funeral

The next day, on 21 November, a grander funeral ceremony was held, at which dignitaries from seventeen countries attended. A delegation from the League of Nations was also present at the funeral procession. The cortege with Atatürk's flag-covered casket on a horse-drawn caisson processed to the Ethnography Museum of Ankara escorted also by nine armed detachments from foreign nations, among them British, Iranian and Yugoslavian guards of honor.

=== Dignitaries ===
- Afghanistan: Amanullah Khan
- Albania
- Belgium
- Bulgaria
- Czechoslovakia
- China
- Denmark
- Egypt
- Estonia
- Finland
- France: Albert Sarraut
- Germany: Konstantin von Neurath
- Greece: Ioannis Metaxas
- Hungary
- Iran
- Iraq
- Italy: Pompeo Aloisi
- Japan
- Latvia
- Lithuania
- Netherlands
- Norway
- Poland
- Romania
- Sweden
- Switzerland
- Syria
- USSR: Vladimir Potemkin
- Spain
- United Kingdom: Dudley Pound and William Birdwood
- United States
- Yugoslavia: Milan Nedić

== Transfer to Anıtkabir ==
=== Temporary resting place ===
Arrived at the Ethnography Museum of Ankara, Atatürk's casket was placed inside a white marmor sarcophagus specially built along with the covering Turkish flag.

Officials planned a monumental mausoleum for Atatürk at the topmost hill in Ankara, Rasattepe as it was called that time. During the fifteen years required for the mausoleum's construction, the Ethnography Museum of Ankara became Atatürk's temporary resting place.

=== Final resting place ===
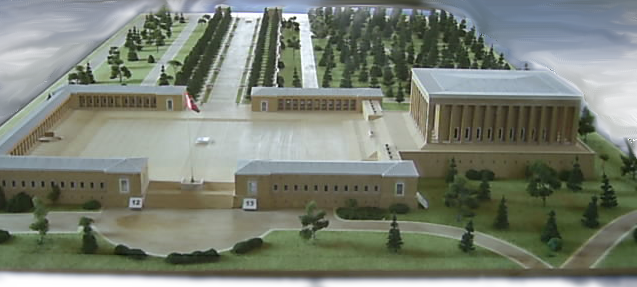
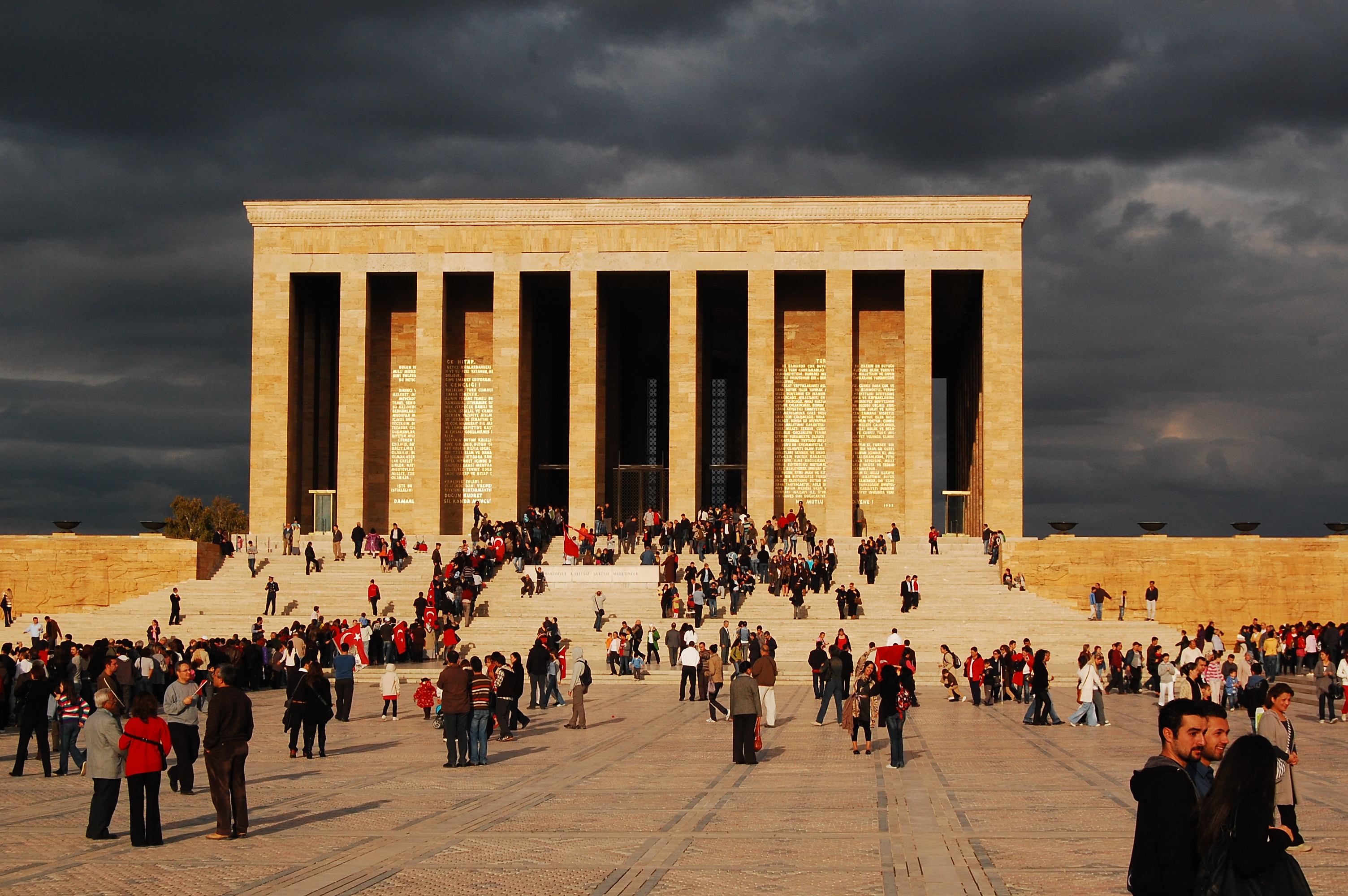
Final resting place

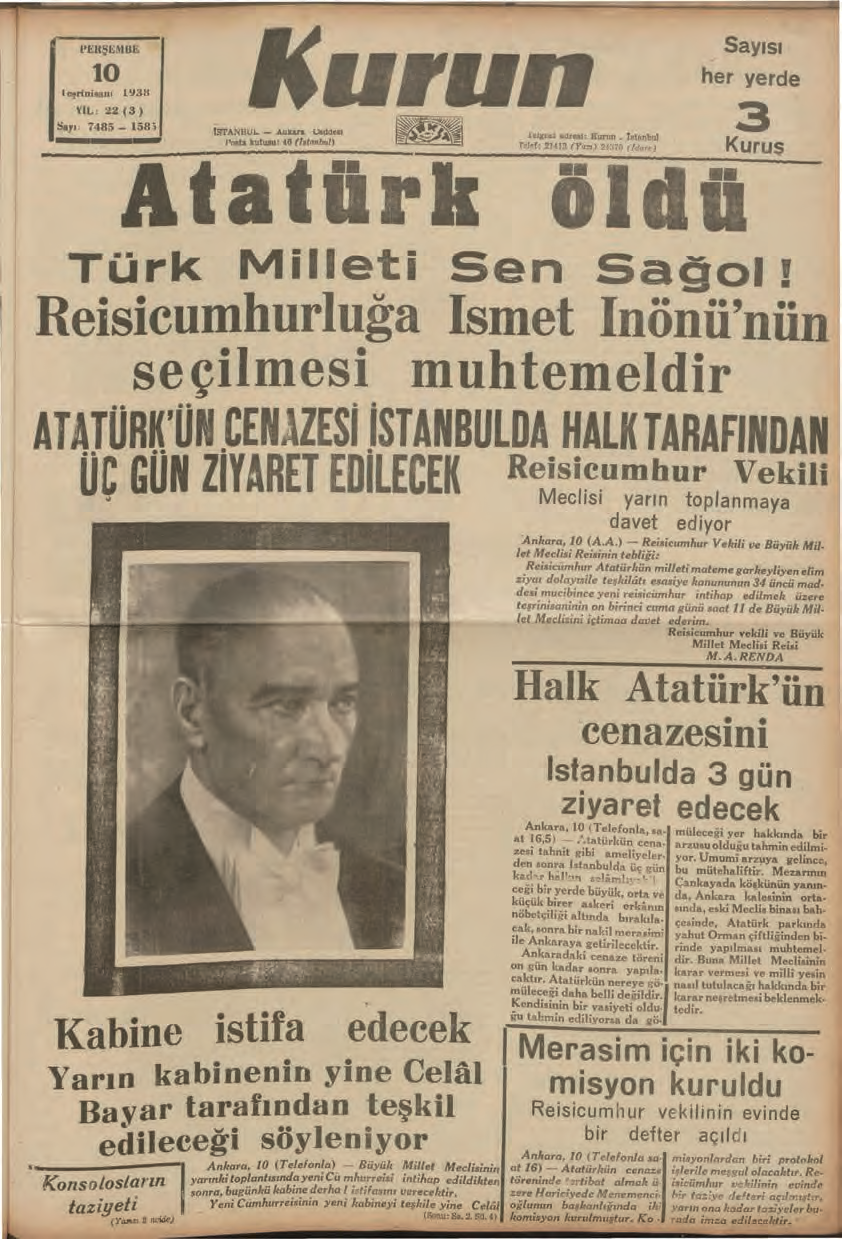
Kurun 10 November 1938 issue announcing the death of President Mustafa Kemal Atatürk

After completion of Anıtkabır in 1953, his sarcophagus was opened and his casket was taken out with the help of a trispastos in the presence of his sister Makbule Atadan, President Celal Bayar, Parliament speaker Refik Koraltan, Prime Minister Adnan Menderes, Chief of General Staff Nuri Yamut, Abdülhalik Renda and some other high officials. The casket was placed on a catafalque. Pathologist Prof. Kamile Şevki Mutlu from the Faculty of Medicine at Ankara University was tasked by Kemal Aygün, the governor of Ankara, with the opening of the casket, the inspection of the remains and the supervision of the preparations for the subsequent burial, which is required by funeral traditional customs. On 9 November, her colleagues Dr. Cahit Özen and Dr. Şeref Yazgan and ten teachers of the technical vocational high school assisted her at this operation attended by high state officials.

After opening of the casket's zinc lining, a brown plastic sack holding his remains came into appearance supported by wood splints. Following the removal of the plastic sack and the shroud inside wrapping his body, it was seen that Atatürk's body remained intact and unputrified thanks to the perfect embalming by Prof. Lütfi Aksu, who died in 1951. A sample of the embalming chemical used was found in the casket in a sealed bottle, labeled with the chemical's description.

The dignitaries present climbed one by one to the catafalque and looked at Atatürk's face. Following the advice of Mutlu, the casket was closed again after treatment of the remains with a special fixator and wrapping in shroud again.

On 10 November, the 15th anniversary of Atatürk's death, his flag-covered casket was taken out the Ethnography Museum and carried on the shoulders of twelve soldiers onto a caisson. 138 young reserve officers in a procession that stretched for two miles (3 km) including the President, the Premier, every Cabinet minister, every parliamentary deputy, every provincial governor and every foreign diplomat, while at the same time 21 million Turks stood silently and motionless for five minutes all over the country. One admiral guarded a velvet cushion which bore the Medal of Independence; the only decoration, among many others held, that Atatürk preferred to wear. The Father of the Turks finally came to rest at his mausoleum, the Anıtkabir. An official noted:

I was on active duty during his funeral, when I shed bitter tears at the finality of death. Today I am not sad, for 15 years have taught me that Atatürk will never die.

In the cortege, the leaders of different religious communities in Turkey as the Armenian Patriarch, Greek Orthodox Patriarch, Roman Catholic Bishop and Jewish Chief Rabbi marched along with the Muslim President of Religious Affairs of Turkey.
