= Atıf Tüzün =

Turkish politician

Mehmet Atıf Tüzün
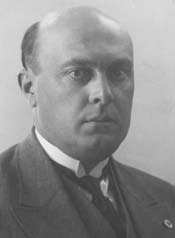

Member of the Grand National Assembly

Personal details
- Born: 1885 Artvin, Ottoman Empire
- Died: 3 April 1970 (aged 84–85)

Mehmet Atıf Tüzün (1885 – 3 April 1970) was a Turkish politician. He was a member of parliament, being a representative from Rize. He also served as the governor of Ankara, and was furthermore involved in activities regarding the transition to a multi-party system.
