= Mustafa Ferit Arsan =

Turkish politician (1876–1941)

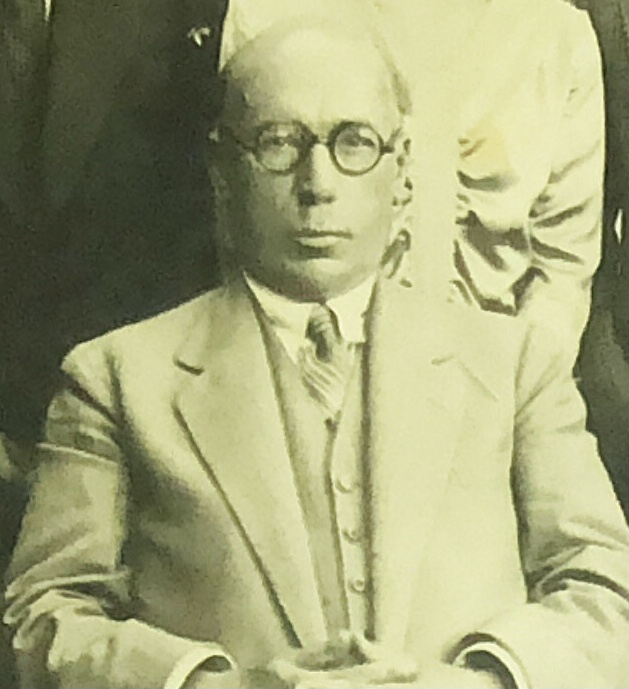
- Arsan in Aintab in early 20th century, after the establishment of the republic
- Born: Mustafa Ferit; 1876; Aintab, Ottoman Empire
- Died: 9 October 1941 (aged 65); Ankara, Turkey

Mustafa Ferit Arsan (1876 – 9 October 1941) was a Turkish politician who represented Gaziantep in the 2nd and 3rd Parliaments of Turkey, and was the leader of the local Association for Defence of National Rights in Aintab, which organized the Turkish militias against the French siege.

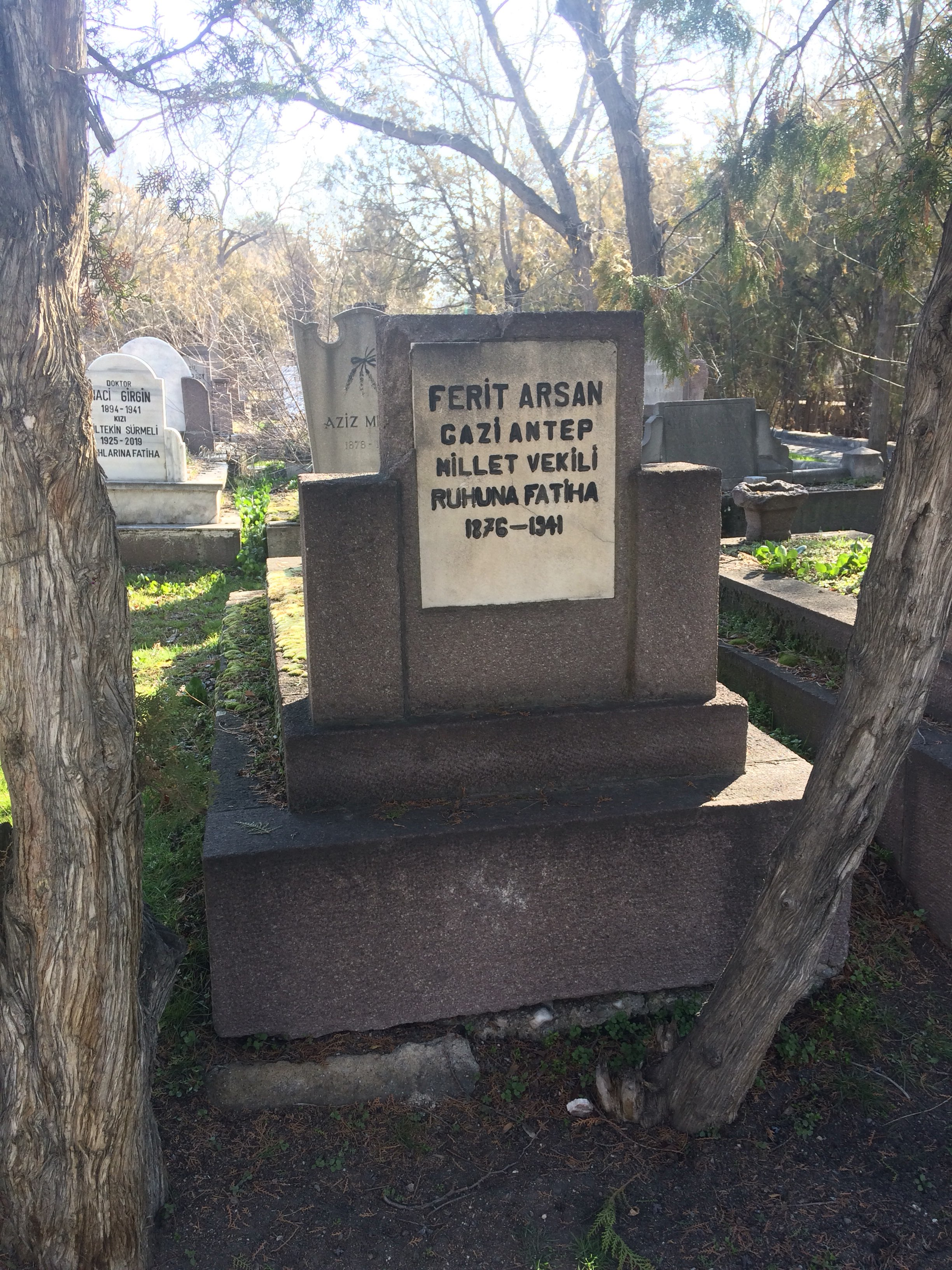
Grave of Arsan, Ankara

Mustafa Ferit was born in Aintab to Mustafa Nuri and Ayşe in 1876. He had two wives, Hatice and Naime, and 6 children, Abdullah, İsmail, Hüseyin Ferit, Hilmi, Beşire, and Ayşe. He went to the local middle school of Aintab and then studied in the French school, where he mastered French and Armenian. After his education, he was particularly involved in trade in Erzurum. During the Franco-Turkish War, he rebelled against the French forces in Aintab and was ultimately captured and held for 9 months, until the French retreat. He died in Ankara on 9 October 1941.
