= Mehmet Şerefettin Yaltkaya =

Turkish religious scholar (1880–1947)

President of Religious Affairs of Turkey
- In office 14 January 1942 – 23 April 1947
- Preceded by: Mehmet Rifat Börekçi
- Succeeded by: Ahmet Hamdi Akseki

Personal details
- Born: 17 November 1880 Istanbul, Ottoman Empire
- Died: 23 April 1947 (aged 66) Ankara, Turkey
- Resting place: Cebeci Asri Cemetery, Ankara
- Children: 3

Mehmet Şerefettin Yaltkaya (17 November 1880 – 23 April 1947) was a Turkish religious scholar, who served as the 2nd president of religious affairs of the Republic of Turkey from 1942 until his death in 1947. He is known for leading the funeral prayer of Mustafa Kemal Atatürk on 19 November 1938 at the Dolmabahçe Palace in Turkish. More than 60 of his works are available.

He was born in Istanbul. After graduating from the Davutpaşa Middle School, he graduated from the Male Teachers' College for Secondary Schools. In 1924, he became a lecturer in the history of remark at the Istanbul University Faculty of Theology, and later became a distinguished professor in the field of Islam and its philosophy. On November 19, 1938, while he was the director of the Institute of Islamic Studies, he led Ataturk's funeral prayer by a limited congregation. He was appointed as the president of religious affairs on January 14, 1942, and died on April 23, 1947, while on duty. His grave is in Cebeci Asri Cemetery in Ankara.

His library was given to the Ankara University Faculty of Language and History–Geography in accordance with his will. He was a supporter of Ataturk's reforms such as Turkish adhan.

== See also ==
- Death and state funeral of Mustafa Kemal Atatürk
- Sicilian Questions
