= Mehmet Rifat Börekçi =

1st President of Religious Affairs
- In office 1 April 1924 – 5 March 1941
- Preceded by: Office created
- Succeeded by: Mehmed Şerafeddin Yaltkaya

Personal details
- Born: Börekçizade Mehmet Rifat; 29 November 1860 Beynam, Bala, Ankara Vilayet, Ottoman Empire
- Died: 5 April 1941 (aged 80) Ankara, Turkey
- Resting place: Cebeci Asri Cemetery, Ankara
- Party: Association for Defence of National Rights (1920)
- Spouse: Samiye
- Occupation: Politician
- Profession: Clergy

Mehmet Rifat Börekçi (29 October 1860 - 5 March 1941) was a Turkish politician and clergy who served as the first president of Religious Affairs in Turkey between 1924 and 1941. At the early stages of the Turkish War of Independence, he founded the Ankara Association for Defence of National Rights (Ankara Müdafaa-i Hukuk Cemiyeti) and supported Turkish National Movement. He was elected as a deputy to the 1st Parliament of Turkey from Menteşe (Muğla). Börekçi had been dismissed as a mufti by the Istanbul Government on 25 April 1920, as he had issued a counter fatwa against anti-Kemalist fatwa of Dürrizade Abdullah. However the Ankara Government had reinstated him to the position.

As a native and the mufti of Ankara, Börekçi was an important supporter of the Independence War and Mustafa Kemal Pasha. He served in the Parliament for six months; after which he left the office and chose to continue his profession.

== Early life and education ==
Börekçizade Mehmet Rifat was born in Beynam village, Bala kaza in 1860. His father was Börekçizade Ali Kazım Efendi, who was regarded as one of the ulama of Ankara. After completing his primary and secondary education in Ankara, he went to Istanbul for higher education. He attended the classes of Atıf Efendi, a müderris of Beyazıt Madrasa and was awarded an ijazah (icazetname).

== Career ==
Mehmet Rifat started his employment as a lecturer in Fazliye Medrese, Ankara. He became a member of the Ankara Court of Appeals on 10 October 1898. He became the Mufti of Ankara on 25 November 1908. He also served as the Kaymakam of Sivrihisar for a while in 1911. He was promoted in 1918 by the Süleymaniye Madrasa and served as the Mufti of Bursa. He was awarded 4th Class Order of Osmanieh in 1920.

During the war, he declared Ankara Fatwa against Shaykh-al-Islam Dürrizade Abdallah's fatwa. The fatwa was signed by 153 muftis and distributed as pamphlets. Soon after, he was dismissed as the Mufti of Ankara on 24 April 1920 by Padishah Mehmed VI, and was sentenced to death by court-martial for his support to the Ankara Government.

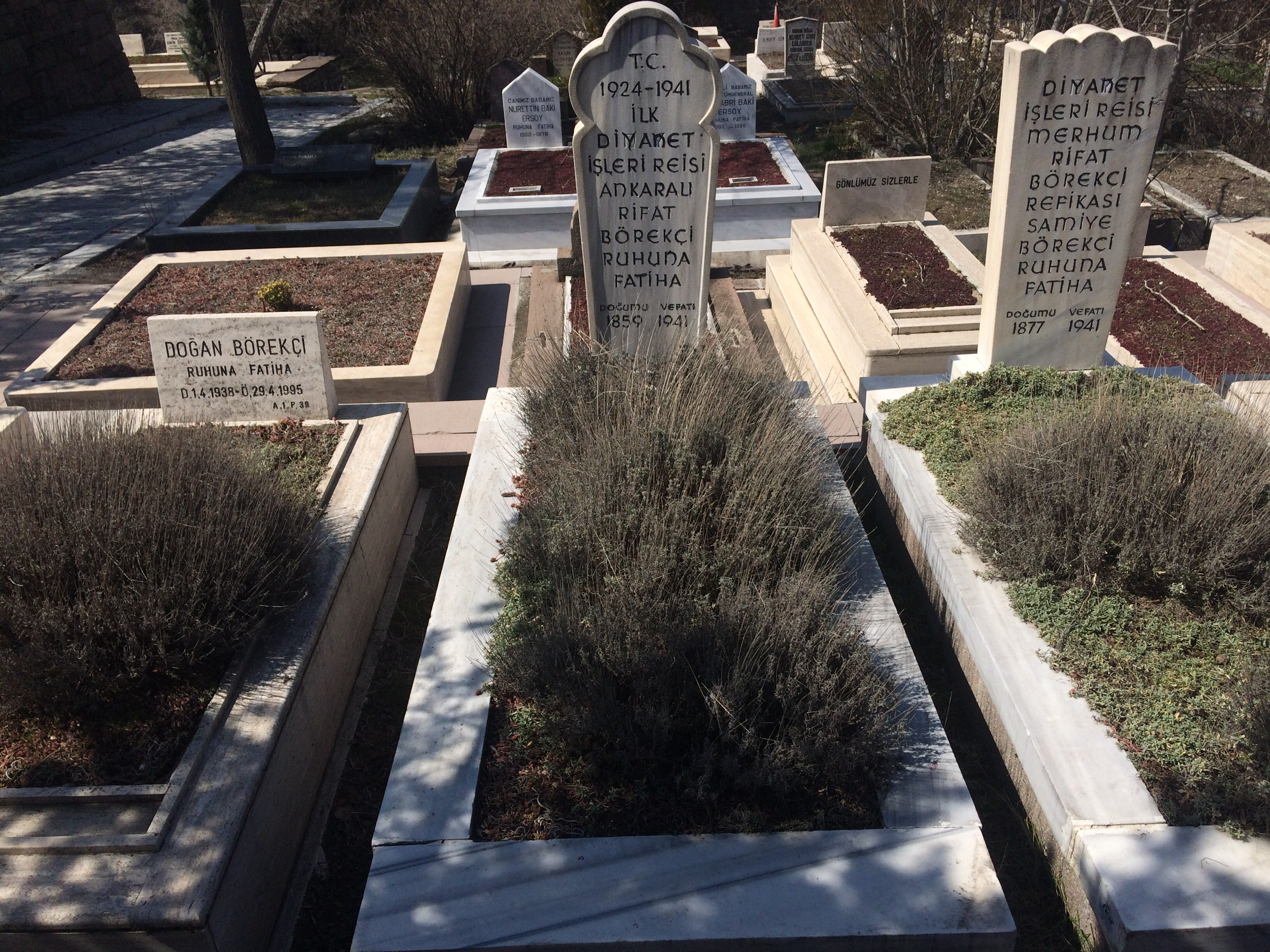
Grave of Rifat Börekçi, Cebeci Asri Cemetery.

He was elected to the 1st Parliament of Turkey on 23 April 1920 as the deputy of Menteşe (Muğla). However he resigned on 27 October 1920, preferring to continue his work as a mufti. He served as a member on the executive board (Heyet-i İtfa) of Ministry of Sharia and the Foundations between 23 December 1922 and 30 March 1924. After the dissolution of the Ministry, he became the first president of Religious Affairs on 4 April 1924. After the Surname Law, he received "Börekçi" surname and served in the position until his death on 5 March 1941.

== See also ==
- Ankara Fatwa

== Sources ==
- Presidency of Religious Affairs

Government offices
Preceded by Office established	1st Presidency of Religious Affairs; 1 April 1924 - 5 March 1941	Succeeded by Mehmed Şerafeddin Yaltkaya
