= Hulki Cevizoğlu =

Turkish journalist, writer and television programmer (born 1958)

Hulki Cevizoğlu MP
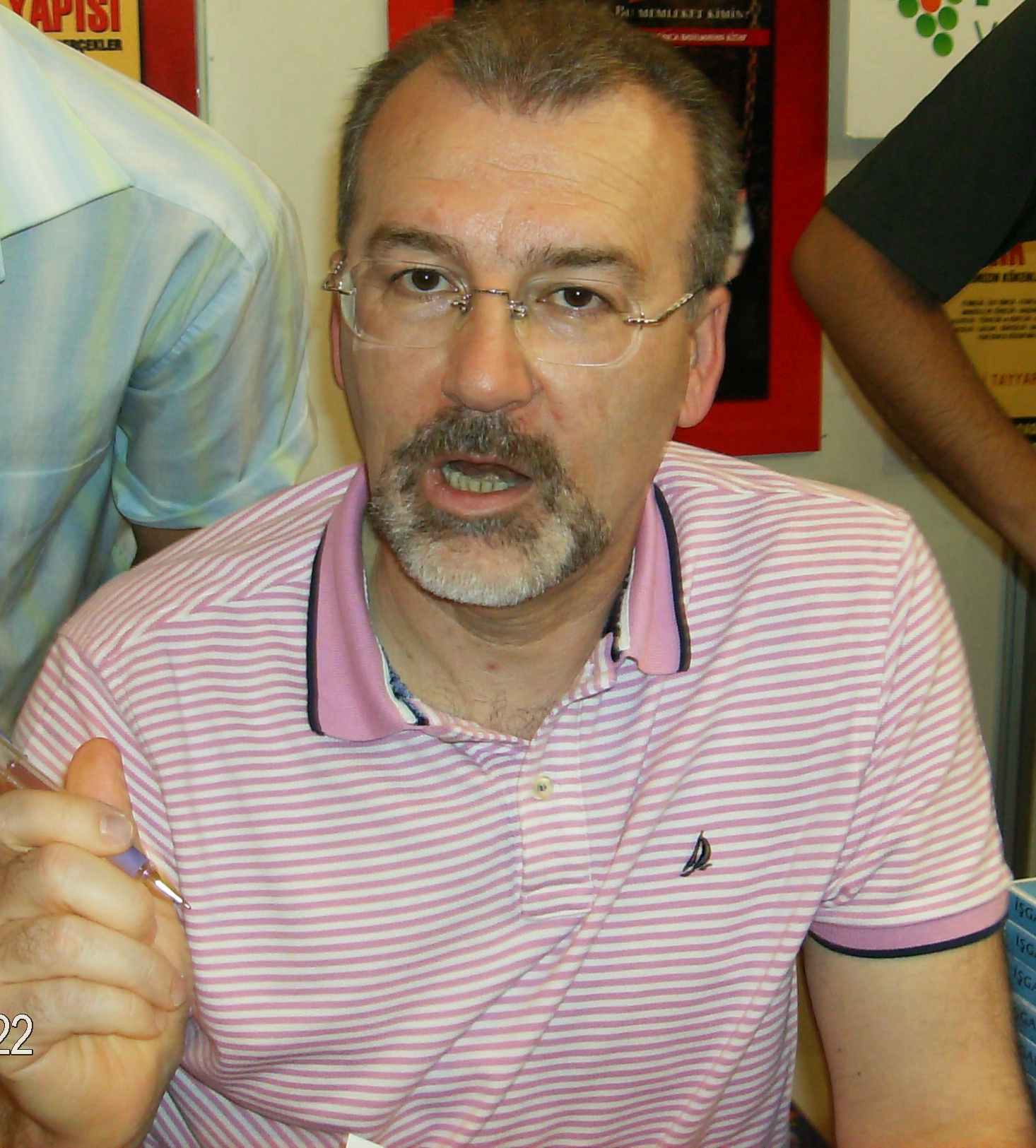

Member of the Grand National Assembly
- Incumbent
- Assumed office 2 June 2023
- Constituency: İstanbul (I) (2023)

Chairman of the Democratic Left People's Party
- In office 23 November 2009 – 13 January 2010
- Preceded by: Party established.
- Succeeded by: Rahşan Ecevit

Personal details
- Born: 1 May 1958 (age 68) Tirebolu, Giresun, Turkey
- Party: Democratic Left People's Party (2009–2010); Patriotic Party (2015); Justice and Development Party (2023-present)
- Children: 1
- Profession: Journalist, writer, political scientist, sociologist

Mustafa Hulki Cevizoğlu (born 1 May 1958, Tirebolu) is a Turkish journalist, author television presenter and politician. He has been a member of the Grand National Assembly for Istanbul's first electoral district in 2023 representing the AKP.

Cevizoğlu began his career at Hürriyet in 1981 and from 1994 presented the discussion programme Ceviz Kabuğu on a succession of channels among the Kanal 6, show TV, ATV, Kanaltürk, Ulusal Kanal and Halk TV. During the 2000s and 2010s he was associated with the Kemalist nationalist current in Turkish media and was a critic of the AKP. He spoke at the 2007 Republic Rallies. He is also the author of books on history, politics and religion and received a doctorate in sociology from Maltepe University in 2019.

He run unsuccessfully for parliament as an independent in 2007 and 2011 as a Vatan party candidate in 2015 and briefly chaired the Democratic Left People’s Party (DSHP) in 2009-2010. In 2023 he was elected as an AKP candidate, a move that drew criticism from former supporters and commentators.

== Life ==
Cevizoğlu, who is originally from Tirebolu, has received many awards with his program Ceviz Kabuğu, which is identified with him.

In 1980, he completed his bachelor's degree in 'Political Science' and then his master's degree in 'Business Administration' at Ankara University Faculty of Political Sciences. In 2019, he completed his doctorate in Sociology at Maltepe University. After working at Hürriyet, where he started his journalism career in 1981, for 8 years without interruption, he worked as a reporter and manager in various press organizations. He took a compulsory 2-year break from the Ceviz Kabuğu program, which he started in 1994. Then the program started again on Karadeniz TV and continued on Ulusal Kanal and Halk TV. In 2020, he announced that the Ceviz Kabuğu program will not continue on Halk TV in the new broadcast period. He was a columnist for Yeniçağ newspaper. He taught Social and Cultural Anthropology in the Department of Sociology at Başkent University.

== Personal life ==
Cevizoğlu is married and has 1 child.

== Political career ==
Cevizoğlu first ran for parliament as an independent candidate in Ankara's first electoral district in the 2007 Turkish general elections, and was not elected. On 23 November 2009 he became the founding chairman of the Democratic Left People’s Party (DSHP), resigning after 39 days on 13 January 2010.Before the 2011 Turkish general elections he applied for a CHP candidacy, but was not placed on the list. He again run as an independent in Ankara 1 and was not elected. In 2015 he was the Vatan party's candidate in Izmir 1 and was not elected.

In the March 2023 Cevizoğlu applied for candidacy with the AKP, which placed him 6th on its Istanbul 1st District in the 2023 general elections. He was elected as an MP from Istanbul 1st District from AK Party.

=== Reaction ===
His candidacy draw attention because of his earlier prominence as an opponent of the AKP, including as a speaker at the 2007 Republic Rallies. After his election he was protested at an event Kadıköy. Cevizoğlu rejected the charge that he came from “another neighbourhood”, saying his support for Atatürk’s principles was unchanged, and has described Erdoğan as acting in an Atatürkist spirit.

== Awards ==
Some of the awards Hulki Cevizoğlu accepted:

- En İyi Gazeteci Ödülü (Rumeli Dernekleri Federasyonu, Best of Rumeli ödülleri) – 2019
- TV Haber Programı Dalında "Yılın Yıldızı" (Yıldız Teknik Üniversitesi-2006)
- Yılın İlkeli ve Onurlu Gazetecisi Ödülü (Sivas Cumhuriyet Üniversitesi.-2005)
- En İyi Tartışma Programı Ödülü (Kabataş Erkek Lisesi)
- 2005 Yılı Televizyon Program Yapımcısı Ödülü (Türk Ocakları Tekirdağ Şb.-2005)
- En Başarılı Tartışma Programı Ödülü (Gaziosmanpaşa Üniversitesi-2005)
- Mülkiyeliler Onur Ödülü (A. Üni. SBF.-2005); Yılın Köşe Yazarı (İnönü Üniversitesi-2005)
- Toplumsal Sorumluluk Medya Başarı Ödülü (Fırat Üniversitesi-2005)
- Yılın Kemalist TV. Programı (Uluslararası Kıbrıs Üniversitesi-2005)
- Yılın En İyi Tartışma Programı (Özel Radyo ve Televizyon Yayıncıları Derneği-2005)
- Yılın Kuvacısı (internetajans.com-2004)
- En Başarılı Ulusal Tartışma Programı (Türkiye Kamu-Sen Giresun Şb.-2004)
- Yılın Tartışma Programı (İstek Bilge Kağan Okulları-2004)
- Tv Haber Programı Dalında Yılın Sembolü (Özel Sembol İ.Ö.O.-2004)
- İlkeli Gazeteci Ödülü (Sivas Cumhuriyet Üni. Atatürkçü Düşünce ve Türk Dili Toplulukları-2004)
- En İyi Tartışma Programı (KKTC Girne Amerikan Üni.-2004)
- En Beğenilen Tartışma Programı (Maltepe Üniversitesi-2004); En İyi Tartışma Programcısı (Türk Ocakları Trabzon Şb.-2004)
- En İyi Tartışma Programcısı (13 İletişim Fakültesi Dekanının Özel Ödülü-2004) (Türkiye’de İlk)
- En İyi Tartışma Programı (Polis Akademisi-2004)
- En İyi Tartışma Programı (Uludağ Üniversitesi Uluslararası İlişkiler Topluluğu-2004)
- Yılın Atatürkçüsü (Atatürkçü Düşünce Derneği, D. Şb.-2004)
- Yılın TV Programı (Niğde Üniversitesi-2004)
- Yılın Tartışma Programı (Türk Eğitim-Sen-2004)
- Yılın En İyi Tartışma Programı (Özel Radyo ve Televizyon Yayıncıları Derneği-2004)
- En Beğenilen TV. Program Yapımcısı (Karadeniz Teknik Üniversitesi. İşletme ve Ekonomi Kulübü-2003)
- Yılın Tartışma Programı (İstanbul Üniversitesi. Diplomasi Kulübü-2003)
- En İyi Haber Programcısı (Gazi Üniversitesi Uluslararası İlişkiler Araştırma Topluluğu-2003)
- Ulusal Televizyon Açık Oturum ve Söyleşi dalında 2002 Yılının En Başarılı İletişimcisi (Selçuk Üniversitesi. İletişim Fakültesi-2003)
- Basın Onur Ödülü (Cumhuriyetçi Gençlik Platformu-2003)
- Ziyad Nemli Büyük Ödülü (Trabzon Gazeteciler Cemiyeti-2003)
- Türk Dünyası’na Hizmet Ödülü (Türk Dünyası Yazarlar ve Sanatçılar Vakfı-TÜRKSAV-2003)
- En Çok İzlenen Tartışma Programı (H.Ü. Bes. ve Diy. Kulübü-2002)
- En Beğenilen TV Program Yapımcısı (B.Ü. İşletme ve Ekonomi Kulübü-2002)
- Yılın En İyi Araştırma Programı (İ.Ü. Bilgisayar Kulübü-2002)
- Açık Oturum Dalında 2001 Yılının En Başarılı İletişimcisi (Selçuk Üniversitesi İletişim Fakültesi-2002)
- 2002 Karaman Türk Dili Ödülü (Karaman Valiliği-2002)
- En İyi Haber ve Tartışma Programı (A.Ü. Hukuk Fakültesi Birleşik Hukukçular Kulübü-2002)
- Medyanın En İyileri, 2001 Yılı En İyi Tartışma Programı (Özel Radyo ve Televizyon Yayıncıları Derneği-2002)
- En Beğenilen Tartışma Programı (Marmara Üniversitesi. İletişim Fakültesi-2001)
- Araştırma dalında 2000 Yılının Bilişimcisi (İ.Ü. Bilgisayar Kulübü-2001)
- Başarı Ödülü (Aydın Gaz.Cem.-2001); Türk Kültürüne ve Sosyal Hayatına Hizmet Eden TV Prog. Ödülü (Türk Ocakları-2000)
- Televizyon Söyleşi dalında 1999’un Başarılı İletişimcisi (İ.Ü. İletişim Fakültesi-1999)
- Gazetecilik dalında Yılın Altın Adamı Ödülü (Anadolu Basın Birliği-1999)
- Televizyon Söyleşi dalında 1998’in Başarılı İletişimcisi (İ.Ü.İletişim Fakültesi-1998)
- 1998 Sedat Simavi Televizyon Ödülü (Türkiye Gazeteciler Cemiyeti-1999)
- Medyada Hoşgörü Ödülü (Çanakkale Onsekiz Mart Üniversitesi-1998)
- Televizyon Söyleşi dalında 1997’nin Başarılı İletişimcisi (İ.Ü. İletişim Fakültesi-1997)
- Yılın Gazetecisi (Gazeteciler Cemiyeti-1997) (Tüm Medya içinde yalnızca tek kişiye verilen ödül)
- Jüri Özel Ödülü (Doğu Anadolu Gazeteciler Cemiyeti.-1997)
- TV Tartışma dalında Yılın Televizyoncusu (T.Yazarlar Birliği-1997)
- Cengiz Polatkan Ödülü (RTGD-1997)
- Haber dalında Yılın Gazetecisi (ÇGD-1987); Haber dalında Yılın Gazetecisi (Çağdaş Gazeteciler Derneği-1986)

== Books ==
- Compositio (Sosyoloji, Psikoloji, Din Felsefesi ve Astronomi Üzerine) (2017)
- Kod Adı:68 (2008)
- İşgal ve Direniş – 1919 ve Bugün (2007)
- Ya Sev, Ya Sevr (Bir Gafletin Büyümesi) (2006)
- Masonluk ve Rotaryenlik (2005)
- Ey Türk İstikbâlinin Evlâdı! (2005)
- Bütün Kaleler Zaptedilmedi (Attilâ İlhan'la Birkaç Saat) (1. Baskı Mart 2004)
- Tarih Türkler'de Başlar (1. Baskı Eylül 2002)
- Türk Olmak (2005)
- Vatikan (Batı'dan Gelen Tehlike) (2005)
- Misyonerlik ve Siyasal Hıristiyanlık (2005)
- Türkiye ve Türkçe Üzerine Oynanan Oyunlar (2004)
- Uzaylılardan Vahiyler! (2003)
- Taze Yazı Kokusu (2003)
- Amerika'nın Körfez Savaşı (2003)
- Altın ve Suikast (Bergama ve Alman Vakıfları Olayı) (2003)
- 28 Şubat: Bir Hükümet Nasıl Devrildi? (2003)
- Kuran Şifrecilerine Cevaplar Edip Yüksel (2002)
- Türkçe İbadet (2002)
- Sözümün Özü (Oğulcan Cevizoğlu'nun Resimleriyle) (2002)
- Yaşar Nuri Öztürk'e Soruyorum (2002)
- Yakın Zamanlar Tarihi (2001)
- Generalinden 28 Şubat İtirafı: "Postmodern Darbe" (2001)
- Eşekli Kütüphaneci (2000)
- Nurculuk (1999)
- Lider Troyka (1999)
- Özelleştirme (1998)
- Yaşar Nuri Öztürk (1998)
- Vicdanımızı Yastık Yapıp Yatıyoruz (1998)
- Şeyhler, Müritler ve Yalancı Peygamberler (1997)
- Dünü Bugünü ile 68'liler (1997)
- Ceviz Kabuğu (1996)
- Misyon (1987)

== Newspapers which he has worked with ==
- 1981–1989: Hürriyet
- ?-?: Sabah
- ?-?: Yeniçağ

== TV Channels which he was worked with ==
- 1994–1995: HBB
- 1995–1999: Kanal 6
- 1999–2000: Show TV
- 2000–2001: Kanal 6
- 2001–2003: atv
- 2004: Star TV
- 2004–2005: Flash TV
- 2005–2008: Kanaltürk
- 2008–2011: Avrasya TV
- 2012–2013: Karadeniz TV
- 2013–2014: Kanal Sokak
- 2013–2016: Ulusal Kanal
- 2019: TELE1
- 2019–2020: Halk TV
- 2020-günümüz: BBN Türk
