= Metin Bostancıoğlu =

Turkish politician

Minister of National Education of Turkey
- In office 11 January 1999 – 10 July 2002
- Prime Minister: Bulent Ecevit
- Preceded by: Hikmet Uluğbay
- Succeeded by: Necdet Tekin

Personal details
- Born: 1942 (age 83–84) Bafra, Samsun, Turkey

Metin Bostancıoğlu (born 1942 in Bafra, Samsun) is a Turkish politician.

== Biography ==
Completing secondary education at Sinop University, Bostancıoğlu chose Ankara University Faculty of Law. He started to work as a lawyer in Ankara Bar by doing lawyer and legal counsel. 20th and 21st semester Sinop Vice President Bostancıoğlu was appointed as the DSP Group Presidency of the Grand National Assembly of Turkey. The Parliamentary Harmonization Commission is also a member of the Constitutional Commission. In 2002 he was the founder of YTP, separated from DSP. Since 2012, he is a member of the Board of Auditors of Turkish Law Institution.
