= KRT =

KRT may stand for:

== Broadcasting ==
- Karadeniz TV (KRT TV since 2014), Turkey
- Radio Tokyo (KRT; 1951–1960), now known as TBS, a Japanese commercial broadcaster

== Transport ==
- Kanawha Valley Regional Transportation Authority, West Virginia, United States
- Kashima Rinkai Railway, Japan
- Khartoum International Airport, Sudan (IATA:KRT)
- Kaohsiung Rapid Transit, Taiwan

== Motor sport ==
- Kawasaki Racing Team (KRT), World Superbike presence of Kawasaki Motors Racing

== See also ==
- KRTV
