= Rahşan Ecevit =

Turkish painter, author, and politician (1923–2020)

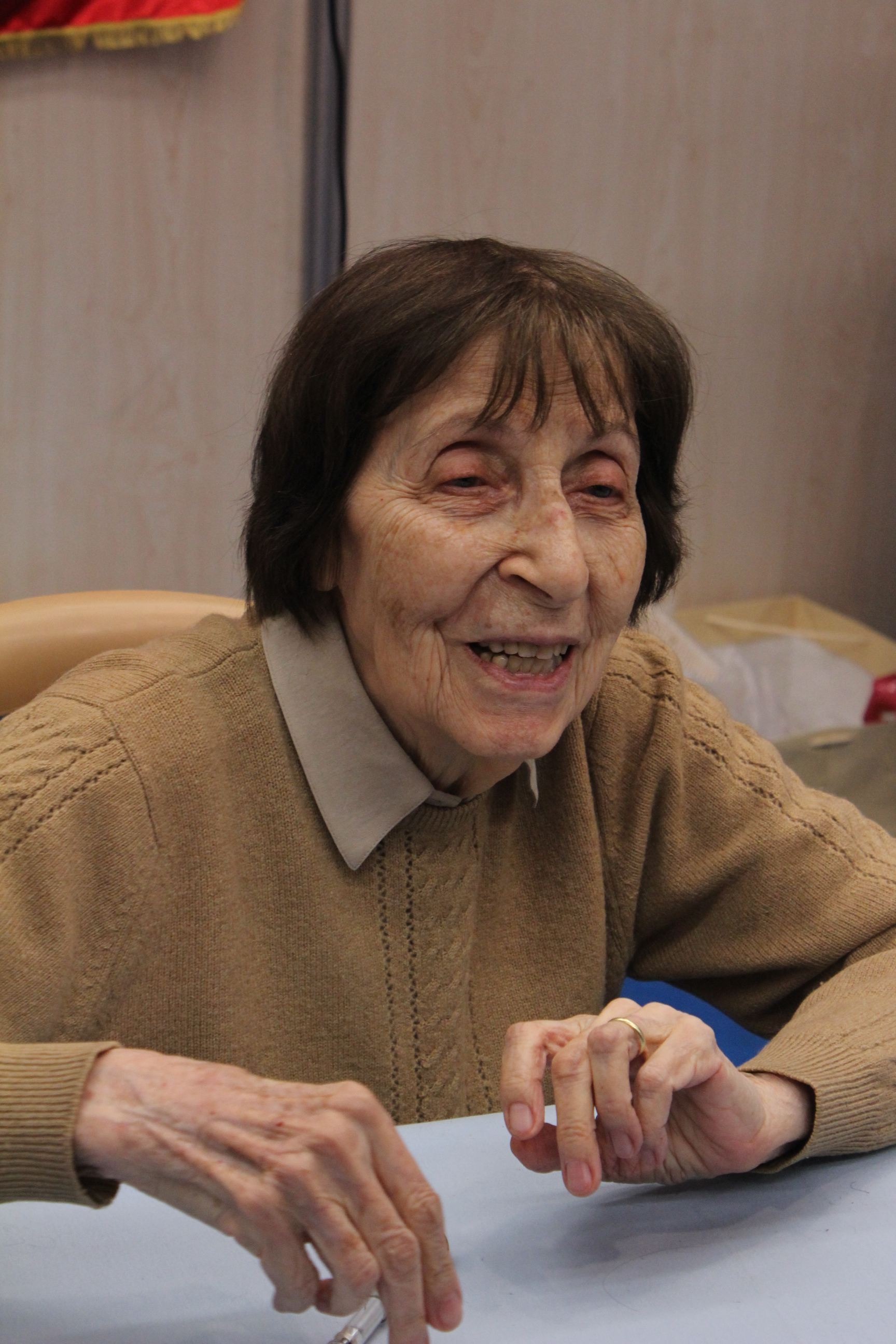
- Ecevit in 2015

Leader of the Democratic Left Party
- In office 14 November 1985 – 13 September 1987
- Preceded by: Position established
- Succeeded by: Bülent Ecevit

Leader of the Democratic Left People's Party
- In office 17 January 2010 – 12 June 2010
- Preceded by: Hulki Cevizoğlu
- Succeeded by: Party closed

Personal details
- Born: Zekiye Rahşan Aral; 17 December 1923 Bursa, Turkey
- Died: 17 January 2020 (aged 96) Ankara, Turkey
- Resting place: Turkish State Cemetery, Ankara
- Party: Democratic Left Party (1985–2009); Democratic Left People's Party (2009–2010)
- Spouse: Bülent Ecevit (m. 1946; died 2006)
- Relatives: Nazlı Ecevit (mother-in-law)
- Education: Robert College
- Profession: Politician, writer, painter

Zekiye Rahşan Ecevit (née Aral, 17 December 1923 – 17 January 2020) was a Turkish author, painter and politician. She was the second lady of Turkey four times during her husband Bülent Ecevit's prime ministries.

== Biography ==
She was born in Bursa, Turkey. Her family originated from Thessaloniki and had initially settled in Şebinkarahisar, a town in Giresun province in northeastern Turkey, after the population exchange in 1920. Her father was Namık Zeki Aral and her mother Zahide Aral. In 1944 Rahşan graduated from the American high school Robert College in Istanbul. She married her classmate Bülent Ecevit in 1946.

Following the military coup in 1980 led by General Kenan Evren, her husband was imprisoned and was suspended from active politics for life. Bülent Ecevit's party, the Republican People's Party (CHP), was closed down. On 14 November 1985, Rahşan founded a centre left social democratic party, the Democratic Left Party (DSP), and led it until her husband's ban from politics was lifted in 1987.

Rahşan Ecevit was the vice president of the Democratic Left Party and responsible for the party's organization between 1989 and 2004. She became the leader of the new Democratic Left People's Party (DSHP) on 17 January 2010 when the DSP seemed to no longer have any chance to win seats in elections. After Kemal Kılıçdaroğlu had become the leader of the CHP and halted the rightist trend within the party, she disbanded her new party and with many members joined the now rather social democratic CHP.

On 5 November 2006, her husband died following an almost 6-month long medically induced coma.

Rahşan Ecevit died on 17 January 2020 at a hospital in Ankara and was buried next to her husband in the Turkish State Cemetery a few days later.

== See also ==
- Women in Turkish politics

Party political offices
Preceded by Party founded	Leader of the Democratic Left Party (DSP); 1985–1987	Succeeded by Bülent Ecevit
Preceded by Hulki Cevizoğlu	Leader of the Democratic Left People's Party (DSHP); 2010	Succeeded by Party closed
