= METU Science and Technology Museum =

- ODTÜ Bilim ve Teknoloji Müzesi
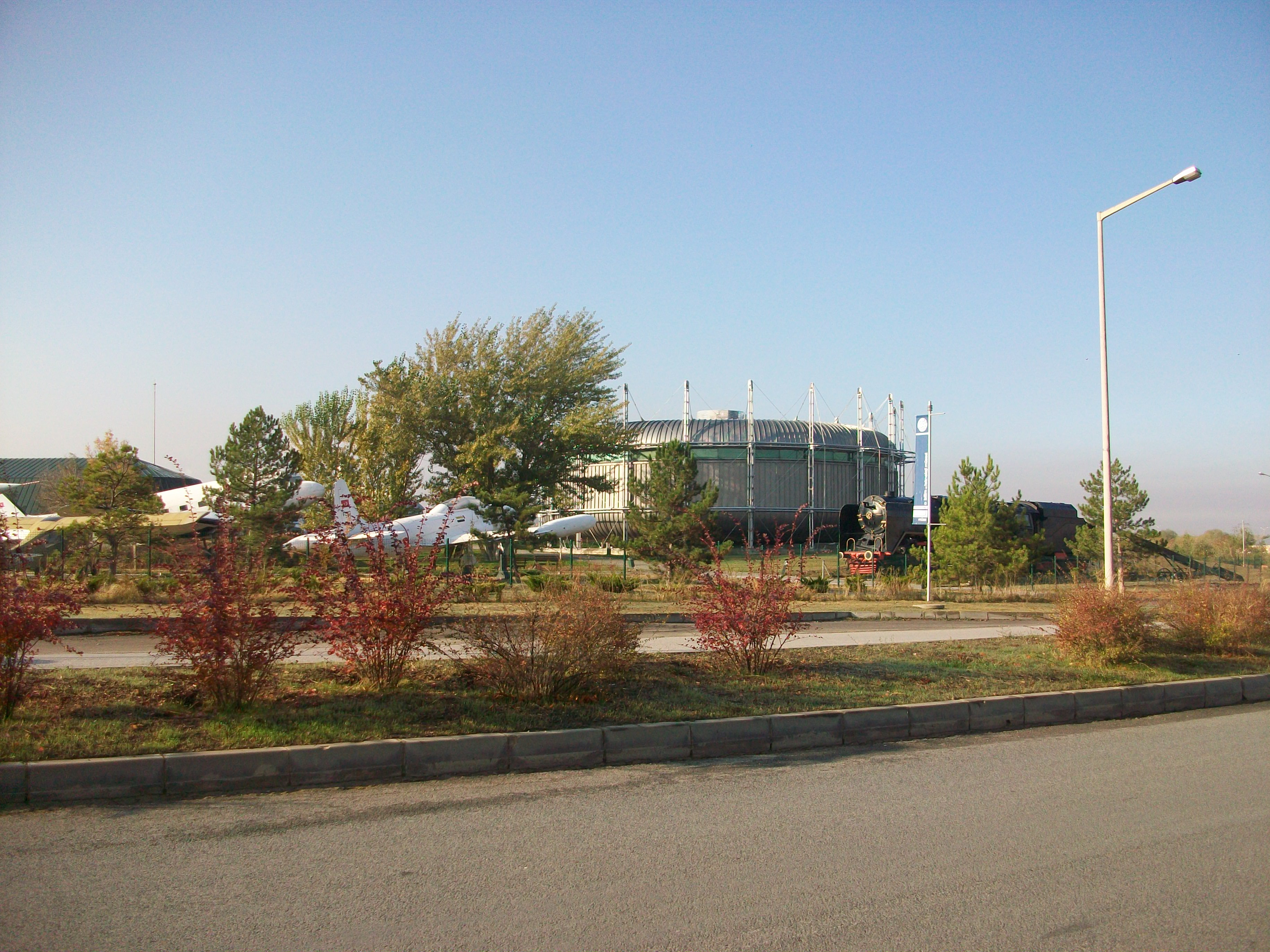

- Location of Feza Gürsey Science Center
- Established: 2003; 23 years ago
- Location: Ankara, Turkey
- Coordinates: 39.902°N 32.772°E
- Type: Science museum

METU Science and Technology Museum (Turkish: ODTÜ Bilim ve Teknoloji Müzesi) is a museum established within the campus of the Middle East Technical University, Ankara, Turkey. The museum is aimed to present the modern technological tools as well as technological past of Turkey.

== Construction ==
The steel carrier system has been used in the construction of the complex which had begun in 2002. Although the planned complex hasn't been finished yet, the museum was opened to public in 2005. When completed, in addition to 10,000 square metres (110,000 sq ft) open space exhibit area, the total closed area will be 3,500 square metres (38,000 sq ft) . The closed area consists of

1. Main hall (also called main silo)
2. Glass hall for receptions and markets
3. Supplementary building (also called hangar)
4. Audio-visual hall

There will also be a pond and an amphitheatre.

== The exhibited items ==
Locomotives, and aircraft such as the C-47 and F-104 are exhibited in the open space area. In the closed area there are test sets for interactive training . The items of historical importance are supplied by the Ministry of Culture One of the most notable items at Ankara University is Ecevit's iconic typewriter, which was donated by the late Bülent Ecevit, a former prime minister of Turkey. Prior to his political career, Ecevit was a journalist, and throughout his life, he preferred using his 70-year-old Erika typewriter. The typewriter serves as a symbol of his legacy and his connection to the field of journalism.
