= Aydın Aybay =

Turkish professor of law, writer and lawyer

Aydın Aybay (1929 – 6 March 2013) was a Turkish professor of law, writer and lawyer. He was one of the founders of the Istanbul University Faculty of Political Sciences, the Maltepe University Faculty of Law and the Cumhuriyet Foundation.

== Biography ==
Aydın Aybay was born in Istanbul. He graduated from Istanbul University Faculty of Law in 1953. In the same year, he started his academic career as a research assistant at the department of civil law. He earned a Doctor of Law degree in 1958 at the same faculty. He became an associate professor (doçent) in 1963 and a full professor in 1973.

In 1979, he founded the Istanbul University Faculty of Political Sciences with his friends. After the 1980 coup d'état, the military administration sacked Aydın Aybay from the university with many other academics. They are against coup d'état. In 1990s, he returned Istanbul University. In 1996, he retired from a public university and started to lecture at the Maltepe University.

In January 2010, Aydın Aybay suffered lung cancer. He died from respiratory failure on 6 March 2013 in Istanbul.
