= Arayış =

Turkish political magazine (1981–1982)

- Editor-in-chief: Necdet Onur
- Categories: Political magazine
- Frequency: Weekly
- Founder: Bülent Ecevit
- Founded: 1981
- First issue: 21 February 1981
- Final issue Number: 2 March 1982; 54
- Country: Turkey
- Based in: Ankara
- Language: Turkish
- OCLC: 32104587

Arayış (Turkish: Search) was a weekly Turkish language political magazine that existed between 1981 and 1982. The magazine is known for its founder and editor, Bülent Ecevit, a Turkish politician who served as the prime minister of Turkey in addition to his other significant posts. The establishment of the magazine was announced by The New York Times stating that Bülent Ecevit had begun to involve in journalism after long years.

== History and profile ==
Arayış was started as a weekly publication in Ankara by Bülent Ecevit following the 1980 military coup after which political parties were closed, including the Republican People's Party led by him. Its first issue appeared on 21 February 1981. The publisher and editor-in-chief of Arayış was Necdet Onur. It came out weekly and was headquartered in Ankara.

The primary function of Arayış was to publish Ecevit's views on political, economic and social situations in Turkey. He argued that the Gallipoli campaign in 1915 played a significant role in the emergence of national identity and solidarity among the Turkish people. Ecevit's writings in the magazine laid the basis of his new political party, namely Democratic Left Party.

Arayış was temporarily banned on 4 April 1981. Although the magazine resumed publication soon and sold 100,000 copies in June 1981, Ecevit was banned from publishing articles in Arayış from the 15th issue. The magazine produced a total of 54 issues before it was shut down by the military government on 2 March 1982.

All issues of Arayış are archived by TUSTAV.
