= Ecevitism =

Turkish political term

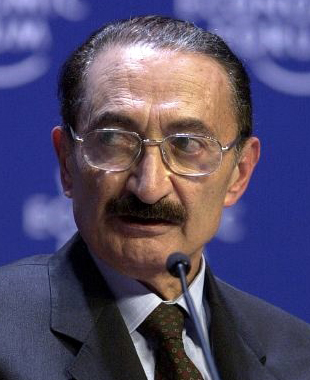
Bülent Ecevit in 2000

Ecevitism (Turkish: Ecevitçilik) is a term used for the political ideals of Bülent Ecevit, who served as the Prime Minister of the Republic of Turkey for four terms between 1974 and 2002. It is highly related to the Democratic Left Party and left-wing nationalism.

When Ecevit entered politics in the 1960s, there was a rise in the socialist movement worldwide. Although he supported socialist ideas, he believed they needed to be presented in a way that aligned with the Kemalist ideology of the Republican People's Party (CHP). To do this, he started the left of center (Turkish: ortanın solu) movement.

Ecevitism, which was very dominant in Turkey especially in the 1970s, still has many supporters today. The political side of this concept, whose ideological roots come from social democracy, is said to be the most dominant, and this ideology reached its peak with the left of center slogan when Ecevit was elected as the Chairman of the CHP in the 1970s. The left of center slogan has been used by right wing politicians in Turkey with the slogan "Ortanın solu, Moskova'nın yolu", meaning "Left of center, the way to Moscow", accusing the center-left politician of communism.

== Foreign policy ==
Ecevit's order for the 1974 invasion of Cyprus acquired him the title "Conqueror of Cyprus" (Turkish: Kıbrıs Fatihi). The invasion became a symbol of Ecevit's bravery and patriotism, and was recognized by many, including the military. Due to his leadership in the Cyprus invasion, he became a national hero with strong nationalist/patriotic credentials.

In his fifth term as the prime minister during 1999 and 2002, Ecevit opposed the 2003 invasion of Iraq.

== See also ==
- Kemalism
- Erdoğanism
