= Hikmet Uluğbay =

Turkish politician

Turkish Deputy Prime Minister
- In office 11 January 1999 – 28 May 1999
- Prime Minister: Bulent Ecevit
- Preceded by: İsmet Sezgin
- Succeeded by: Cumhur Ersümer

Turkish Minister for Economy Responsible
- In office 11 January 1999 – 22 July 1999
- Prime Minister: Bulent Ecevit
- Preceded by: Güneş Taner
- Succeeded by: Recep Önal

Minister of National Education of Turkey
- In office 30 June 1997 – 11 January 1999
- Prime Minister: Mesut Yılmaz
- Preceded by: Mehmet Sağlam
- Succeeded by: Metin Bostancıoğlu

Personal details
- Born: 1939 (age 86–87) Isparta, Turkey

Hikmet Uluğbay (born 1939, Isparta, Turkey) is a Turkish politician.

== Biography ==
In 1961, he completed the Faculty of Political Sciences of Ankara University. He received a degree from Southern California University. He served at Ministry of Finance Tokyo and Permanent Mission to NATO Financial and Economic Counselor, OECD Permanent Representative Aid, Washington Embassy Economy and Trade Chief Advisor, Treasury General Directorate, Bilkent University Lecturer, XX. XXI. He served as Minister of National Education between 1997*1999 and Deputy Prime Minister in 1999.

On July 6, 1999, he attempted suicide with licensed guns, his tongue broke apart, however, he was miraculously survived. Prime Minister Bülent Ecevit stated that a crisis is stressful because of the International Monetary Fund (IMF) talks.
