= Democratic Left People's Party =

Democratic Left People's Party Demokratik Sol Halk Partisi
- Abbreviation: DSHP
- Founder: Hulki Cevizoğlu, Rahşan Ecevit
- Founded: November 23, 2009
- Dissolved: June 12, 2010
- Split from: Democratic Left Party
- Merged into: Republican People's Party
- Ideology: Kemalism; Social democracy
- Political position: Centre-left
- International affiliation: Socialist International
- Colours: White and blue

Democratic Left People's Party (Turkish: Demokratik Sol Halk Partisi, DSHP) was a short-lived political party in Turkey. It was founded by ex-members of Democratic Left Party, led by Rahşan Ecevit. Its founding leader was Hulki Cevizoğlu. Cevizoğlu quit the office on January 13, 2010. In the founder's meeting on January 17, 2010, Rahşan Ecevit was elected as new leader.

In May 2010, after Deniz Baykal's resignation of leadership of Republican People's Party, major left-wing party in Turkey, there was strong support for Kemal Kılıçdaroğlu in the left-wing media. Rahşan Ecevit also supported Kılıçdaroğlu for the sake of unity in the left wing. She joined the CHP congress on May 22, 2010, when Kılıçdaroğlu was elected as the new leader. Finally, the founder's board chose to close the party on June 12, 2010.

== Leaders ==
#	Name	Starts	Ends	Days in office
1	Hulki Cevizoğlu	November 23, 2009	January 13, 2010	1 month 21 days
2	Rahşan Ecevit	January 17, 2010	June 12, 2010	4 months 26 days
