= Necdet Karababa =

Turkish politician

Chairman of the Democratic Left Party
- In office 7 March 1988 – 15 January 1989
- Preceded by: Bülent Ecevit
- Succeeded by: Bülent Ecevit

Personal details
- Born: 1926 Birecik, Şanlıurfa, Turkey
- Died: 2006 (aged 79–80)

Necdet Karababa (1926 - 2006) is a Turkish politician and former leader of the Democratic Left Party.

He was elected leader of the Democratic Left Party at its general assembly held on 7 March 1988, following the resignation and leaving the politics of Bülent Ecevit some time before. He resigned from this post on 28 December 1988 after ongoing disagreements with Ecevit's spouse Rahşan. Necdet Karababa did not run for this position at the next party convention on 15 January 1989, and was succeeded by Bülent Ecevit, who returned to active politics again following strong demand by party members.

Karababa is married to Atifet Karababa and the couple has three children.

Party political offices
Preceded by Bülent Ecevit	Leader of the Democratic Left Party (DSP); 7 March 1988–29 December 1988	Succeeded by Bülent Ecevit
