= Bülent Ecevit =

Prime Minister of Turkey (1974; 1977; 1978–79; 1999–2002)

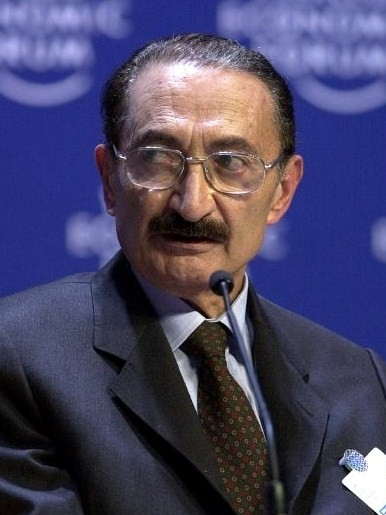
- Ecevit in 2000

Prime Minister of Turkey
- In office 11 January 1999 – 18 November 2002
- President: Süleyman Demirel; Ahmet Necdet Sezer
- Deputy: Devlet Bahçeli; Hüsamettin Özkan; Şükrü Sina Gürel; Mesut Yılmaz; Hikmet Uluğbay
- Preceded by: Mesut Yılmaz
- Succeeded by: Abdullah Gül
- In office 5 January 1978 – 12 November 1979
- President: Fahri Korutürk
- Deputy: Orhan Eyüboğlu; Turhan Feyzioğlu; Hikmet Çetin; Faruk Sükan
- Preceded by: Süleyman Demirel
- Succeeded by: Süleyman Demirel
- In office 21 June 1977 – 21 July 1977
- President: Fahri Korutürk
- Deputy: Orhan Eyüboğlu
- Preceded by: Süleyman Demirel
- Succeeded by: Süleyman Demirel
- In office 26 January 1974 – 17 November 1974
- President: Fahri Korutürk
- Deputy: Necmettin Erbakan
- Preceded by: Naim Talu
- Succeeded by: Sadi Irmak

Deputy Prime Minister of Turkey
- In office 30 June 1997 – 11 January 1999
- Prime Minister: Mesut Yılmaz
- Served with: İsmet Sezgin
- Preceded by: Tansu Çiller
- Succeeded by: Hikmet Uluğbay

Leader of the Democratic Left Party
- In office 15 January 1989 – 25 July 2004
- Preceded by: Necdet Karababa (acting)
- Succeeded by: Zeki Sezer
- In office 13 September 1987 – 7 March 1988
- Preceded by: Rahşan Ecevit
- Succeeded by: Necdet Karababa

3rd Leader of the Republican People's Party
- In office 14 May 1972 – 30 October 1980
- Preceded by: İsmet İnönü
- Succeeded by: Deniz Baykal (1992)

16th Minister of Labour
- In office 20 November 1961 – 20 February 1965
- Prime Minister: İsmet İnönü
- Preceded by: Cahit Talas
- Succeeded by: İhsan Sabri Çağlayangil

Member of the Grand National Assembly
- In office 20 October 1991 – 18 November 2002
- Constituency: Zonguldak (1991); Istanbul (1995, 1999)
- In office 27 October 1957 – 12 September 1980
- Constituency: Ankara (1957, 1961); Zonguldak (1965, 1969, 1973, 1977)

Personal details
- Born: 28 May 1925 Istanbul, Turkey
- Died: 5 November 2006 (aged 81) Ankara, Turkey
- Resting place: Turkish State Cemetery, Ankara
- Party: Republican People's Party (1943–1980); Democratic Left Party (1985–2006)
- Spouse: Rahşan Aral (m. 1946)
- Relations: Nazlı Ecevit (mother); Fahri Ecevit (father)
- Education: School of Oriental and African Studies
- Nickname(s): Karaoğlan; Ecevit the Populist; Conqueror of Cyprus

Mustafa Bülent Ecevit (Note: Turkish pronunciation: [mustaˈfa byˈlænt eˈdʒevit]) (28 May 1925 – 5 November 2006) was a Turkish statesman, poet, writer, scholar, and journalist. He served as the Prime Minister of Turkey four times between 1974 and 2002, specifically in 1974, 1977, 1978–79, and 1999–2002. Ecevit was Chairman of the Republican People's Party (CHP) from 1972 to 1980, and became Chairman of the Democratic Left Party (DSP) in 1987.

Ecevit was elected a CHP MP from Ankara in the 1957 general election and came to prominence as Minister of Labour in İsmet İnönü's cabinets, representing the rising left-wing faction of the party. In 1972, Ecevit became leader of the CHP. His leadership reached out to working-class voters and cemented the party as "Left of Centre".

Ecevit first became Prime Minister in 1974, during which he retracted the ban on cultivation of opium and invaded Cyprus. He formed two more governments in 1977 and 1978–1979 which were marked by increasing polarisation, deadlock, and political violence that ended with the 1980 coup.

Following the coup, Ecevit was banned from politics for ten years. During this decade, the Democratic Left Party (DSP) was established under the leadership of his wife, Rahşan. When the ban was lifted in 1987, he became the head of the DSP. While heading a caretaker government for the 1999 general election, PKK leader Abdullah Öcalan was captured in Kenya, allowing DSP to emerge victorious. The DSP-MHP-ANAP coalition (1999–2002) introduced important political and economic reforms, as well as beginning Turkish accession into the European Union. The MHP's withdrawal from the coalition led to the government's collapse, and at the subsequent 2002 snap election, the DSP was ejected from Parliament after being unable to clear the electoral threshold. Ecevit resigned as Chairman of the party in 2004. He died on 5 November 2006 of circulatory and respiratory failure.

Ecevit is known for being Turkey's only left-wing Prime Minister. His chairmanship resulted in the highest shares of votes CHP or any other left-wing party have ever gained in Turkish history. He is credited for introducing social democratic politics to Turkey by a combination of Kemalism with social democracy, thus making social democracy a core tenet in modern Kemalist ideology. Ecevit is the last non-AKP Prime Minister of Turkey.

== Early life ==
Mustafa Bülent was born 28 May 1925 in Istanbul to a middle-class family. He was named after his paternal grandfather Mustafa Şükrü Efendi, who was an Islamic scholar of Kurdish origin but born in a village in Kastamonu. Mustafa Şükrü's son and Bülent's father Fahri Ecevit was a professor of forensic medicine in Ankara University's Law School. Fahri later entered politics and served as a Republican People's Party member of parliament for Kastamonu between 1943-1950. His mother Fatma Nazlı, was among the first women in Turkey to paint professionally.

Bülent Ecevit's maternal great-grandfather was the Meccan Sheikh-ul-Islam Hacı Emin Pasha, who served to protect the holy sites of Hejaz in the Ottoman Empire. The inheritance of his estate, which consisted of approximately 110 decares of land and 99 acres of the Masjid an-Nabawi was left to him once Ecevit's mother died. One lawyer valued the estate at almost $2 billion, while unofficial valuation made by a Medina Court put it at $11 billion. In the end Ecevit donated the proceeds of the estate to the Directorate of Religious Affairs for the benefit of Turkish Hajjis, after his retirement from politics.

Ecevit had no siblings or children.

=== Education, journalism, and writing ===
In 1944, Ecevit graduated from Robert College in Istanbul. He started work as a translator at the General Directorate for Press and Publication (Turkish: Basın Yayın Genel Müdürlüğü). In 1946, shortly after marrying his classmate Zekiye Rahşan Aral, he moved to London to work in the Turkish embassy as a press attaché. During his stay he studied Bengali, Sanskrit and Art History at the School of Oriental and African Studies but did not graduate. He also indulged in composing Sufi poetry. Bülent Ecevit was not only a politician but also a poet, journalist and a writer. In the 1950s, he worked as an editor for Ulus, and then Yeni Ulus, Halkçı, and Forum. He later reported that both Ulus and Forum were two significant parts of his intellection life of that period.

In 1955 Ecevit went to the United States for three months as a guest journalist for the Winston-Salem Journal in North Carolina, and was disturbed by the racism he witnessed in the American South. On his last day at the newspaper he wrote a front-page article about how strange it was that Americans took it upon themselves to fight oppression in the world while white Americans were

“guilty of refusing to drink from the same fountain as the man who has fought on the same front for the same cause; guilty of refusing to travel on the same coach or seat as the man who has been working with equal ardor for a common community; guilty of refusing to pray to God side by side with the man who believes in the same prophet's teaching.”

On a State Department fellowship, he returned to the US with a Rockefeller Foundation Fellowship Scholarship in 1957, studying social psychology and Middle East history at Harvard University for eight months. He attended lectures on anti-communism with Olof Palme and Bertrand Russell and attended Henry Kissinger's Harvard International Seminar.

Even as a politician he continued writing for various newspapers, including the daily Milliyet in 1965, the monthly Özgür İnsan magazine in 1972, the weekly Arayış in 1981, and the monthly Güvercin magazine in 1988. Ecevit also translated works by Rabindranath Tagore, T. S. Eliot, Ezra Pound, and Bernard Lewis into Turkish. Ecevit was successful in these literary endeavors despite never having graduated from a university, a fact that prevented him from ever running for the Presidency of the Turkish Republic.

== Early political career ==
Bülent Ecevit returned to Turkey in 1950 as a journalist, eventually writing for Ulus. Writing about politics made him interested in pursuing a career of it, so he registered with the Republican People's Party (CHP) Çankaya branch in 1954, eventually taking part in its Youth Branch Executive Board. At the age of thirty two, he was elected into parliament for the first time in 1957, representing Ankara as a member of the CHP. He was part of the party's delegation to the Constituent Assembly to draft a new constitution after the 1960 military coup d'état. At the age of thirty six, he served as the Minister of Labour in three coalition governments headed by İsmet İnönü between 1961 and 1965. Under his purview, the Law on Collective Bargaining, Strikes and Lockouts was signed, which as well as expanding social security privileges, finally allowed Turkish workers the right to strike and collective bargaining.

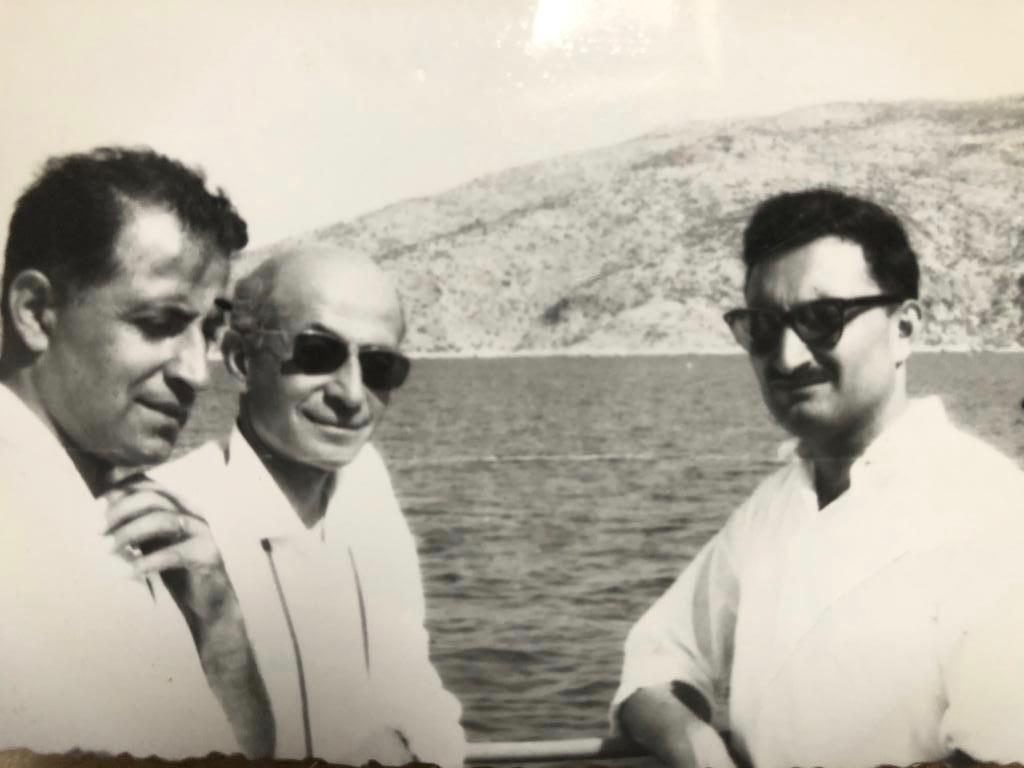
Nurettin Ardıçoğlu, Sabahattin Ardıçoğlu and Ecevit by Lake Hazar, Sivrice, Elazığ

By 1965, Ecevit was the leader of the "Democratic Left Movement", a young and energetic left-wing faction in the CHP. His closeness with left-wing politics came from his admiration of the Labour Party and the burgeoning welfare state he was exposed to while studying in Britain. He pressured his mentor İnönü to adopt a new party program known as Left of Center for the general elections that year, arguing that democratic socialism was the best way to combat communism. The party lost the election to Süleyman Demirel's center-right Justice Party. In opposition, the party was racked with internal power struggles, as Ecevit and Turhan Feyzioğlu fought over the party's political orientation. İnönü reluctantly favored Ecevit (who he thought was too young), and in the 18th ordinary CHP congress held in 1966 he was elected secretary general of the CHP. An extraordinary congress held the next year saw 47 deputies and senators led by Feyzioğlu leave the CHP to found the Reliance Party. In 1969, secretary general Ecevit announced a village development program and using the slogan "Land for those who cultivate it, water for those who utilize it."

Another inter-party crisis occurred in the military memorandum of 1971, as Ecevit resigned from his position in protest against İnönü's decision to support the military government. He objected the memorandum, saying that it was directed against the Left of Center movement within the CHP. Heated exchanges occurred between the once old allies, with at one point İnönü saying "[It's] Either me or Bülent!" promising that he would resign if his party did not have confidence in him. On 8 May 1972 İsmet İnönü lost a vote of confidence to Ecevit in an extraordinary congress. İnönü thus was the first general chairman in Turkish political history to lose his position as a result of a party leadership vote.

== CHP chairman ==
Despite the conflict between İnönü and Ecevit originally being about the former's support for the technocratic military government, Ecevit initially provided ministers to the Melen government, but withdrew support soon after a reaction from his party base. Rumours circulated that CHP would be banned by the military.

In the 1973 presidential election, both Ecevit and Demirel agreed to end the soldier-president tradition and voted against Faruk Gürler. The two compromised to support Fahri Korutürk's candidacy as the president, who was an admiral. However, secretary general Kamil Kırıkoğlu still voted for Gürler and he and 32 CHP deputies resigned from the party.

=== First premiership (1974) ===
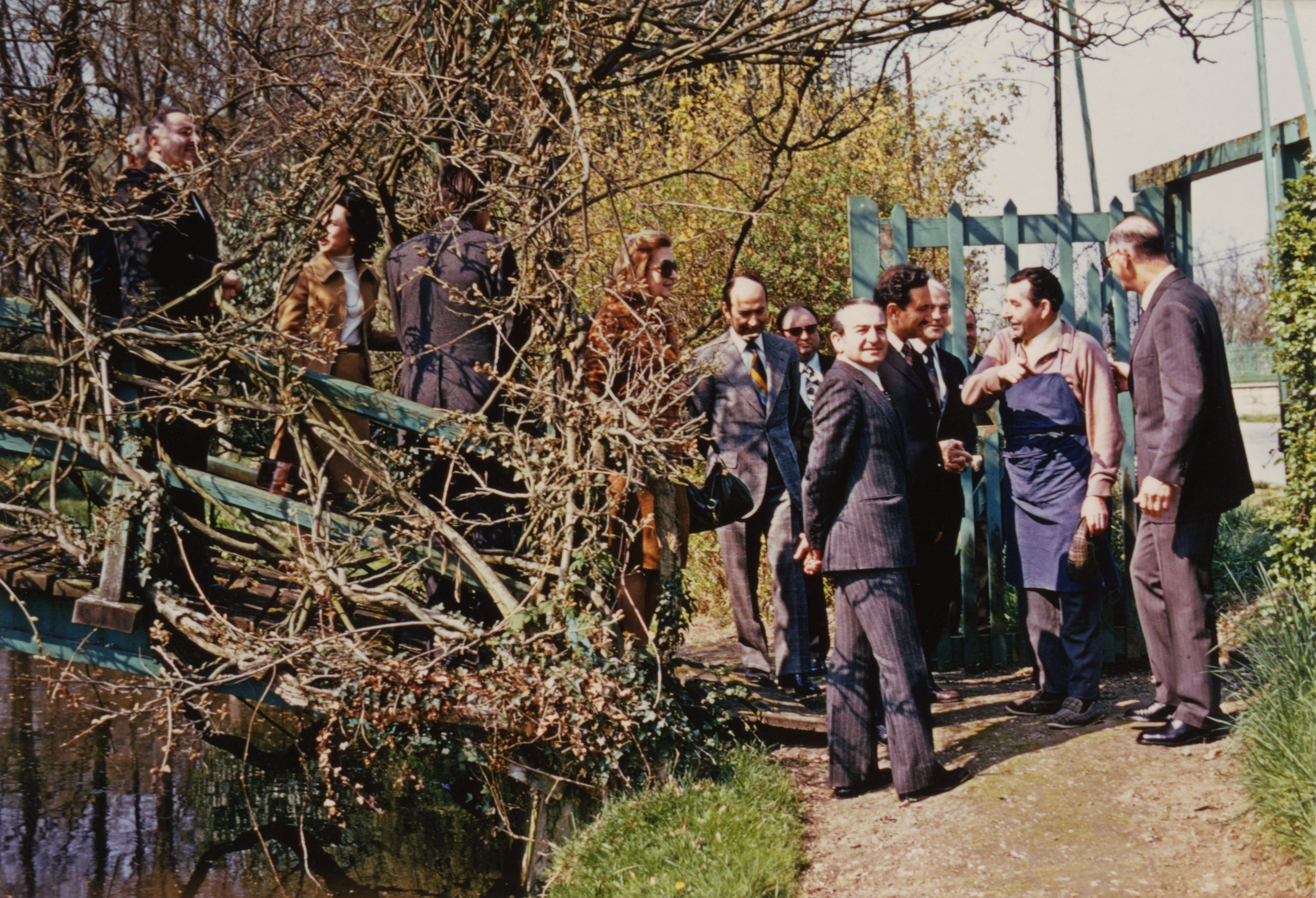
A delegation led by Prime Minister Bülent Ecevit, visiting Claude Monet's gardens after attending French President Georges Pompidou's funeral. The delegation was received by Bernard Berche, the Mayor of Giverny. The French hosts were reportedly embarrassed for their presenting the unkempt garden in front of the cultured Turkish prime minister who spoke perfect English.

The CHP's electability was put to the test in the general elections of 1973. With the campaign slogan Akgünlere (To brighter days), the help of labour unions, and other leftist groups, the CHP won 185 deputies with 33.3% of the votes, winning a plurality of the votes and seats in parliament. Ecevit was invited to form a government and formed a coalition with the Islamist National Salvation Party (MSP) headed by Necmettin Erbakan.

A general amnesty that saw 40,000 rightists and leftists leave jail was implemented, as well as lifting the ban on opium cultivation that was previously implemented by the military governments under heavy American pressure. The age to vote was lowered to 18.

In July 1974, inter-communal violence in Cyprus once again flared up when pro-EOKA forces staged a coup against president Makarios. Ecevit went to London to meet with British officials, as the UK is also a guarantor state of Cyprus, but a common policy for the situation in Cyprus was not found. Ecevit decided to militarily intervene and invaded Cyprus, for which he is nicknamed the 'Conqueror of Cyprus' (Turkish: Kıbrıs Fatihi). This resulted in an arms embargo by the United States on Turkey which lasted for three years.

As a left-wing nationalist, Ecevit initially believed Turkey's destiny was not with Europe. He extended this Eurosceptic sentiment to his economic policy, not only establishing generous social programs and enabling a larger government role in the economy, but also raising protective tariffs to keep cheap foreign goods out of Turkey. His combative stance against Athens prevented Turkey from joining the European Economic Community jointly with Greece in 1979.

=== Polarization ===
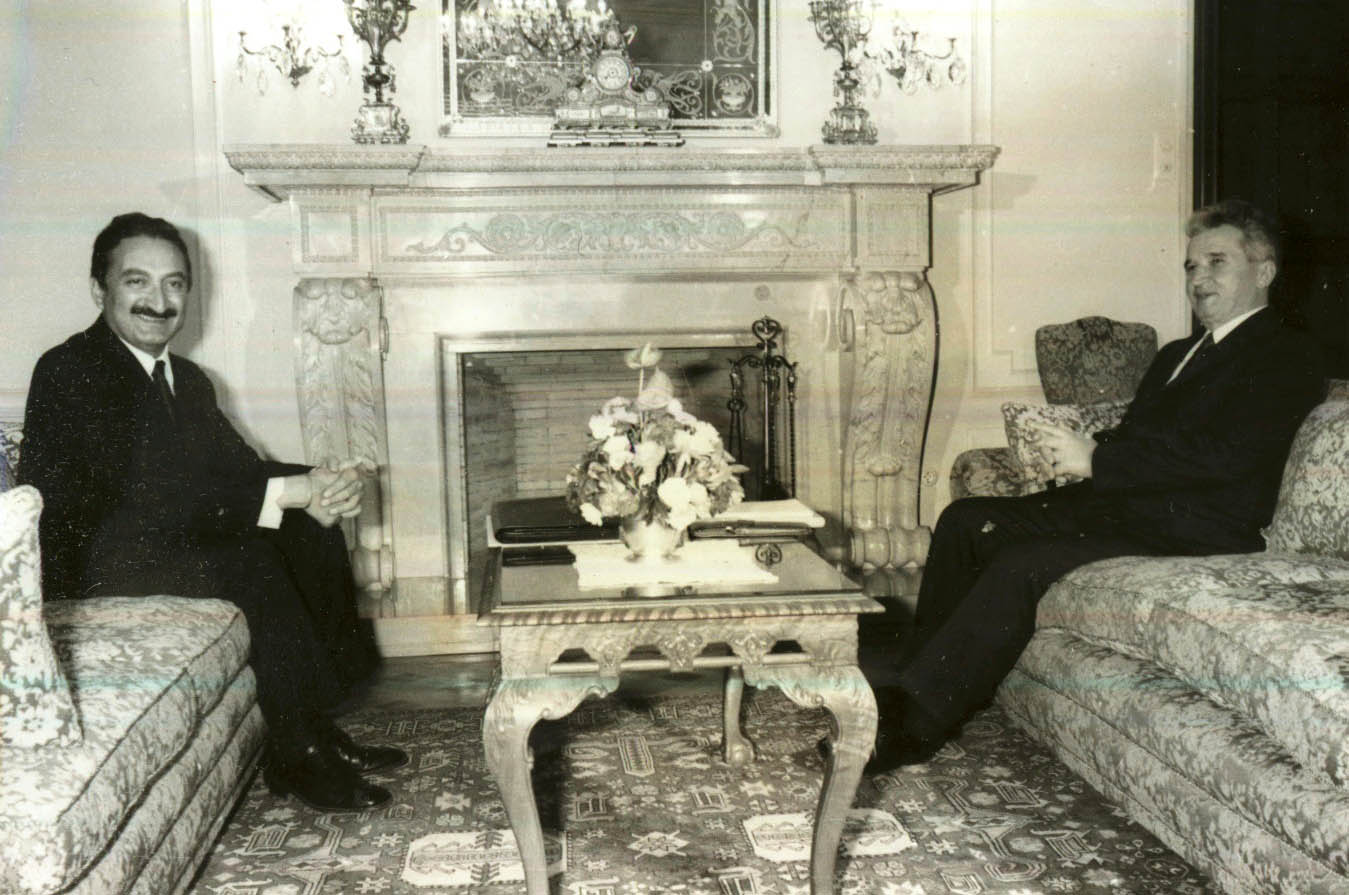
Bülent Ecevit and Romanian communist leader Nicolae Ceaușescu

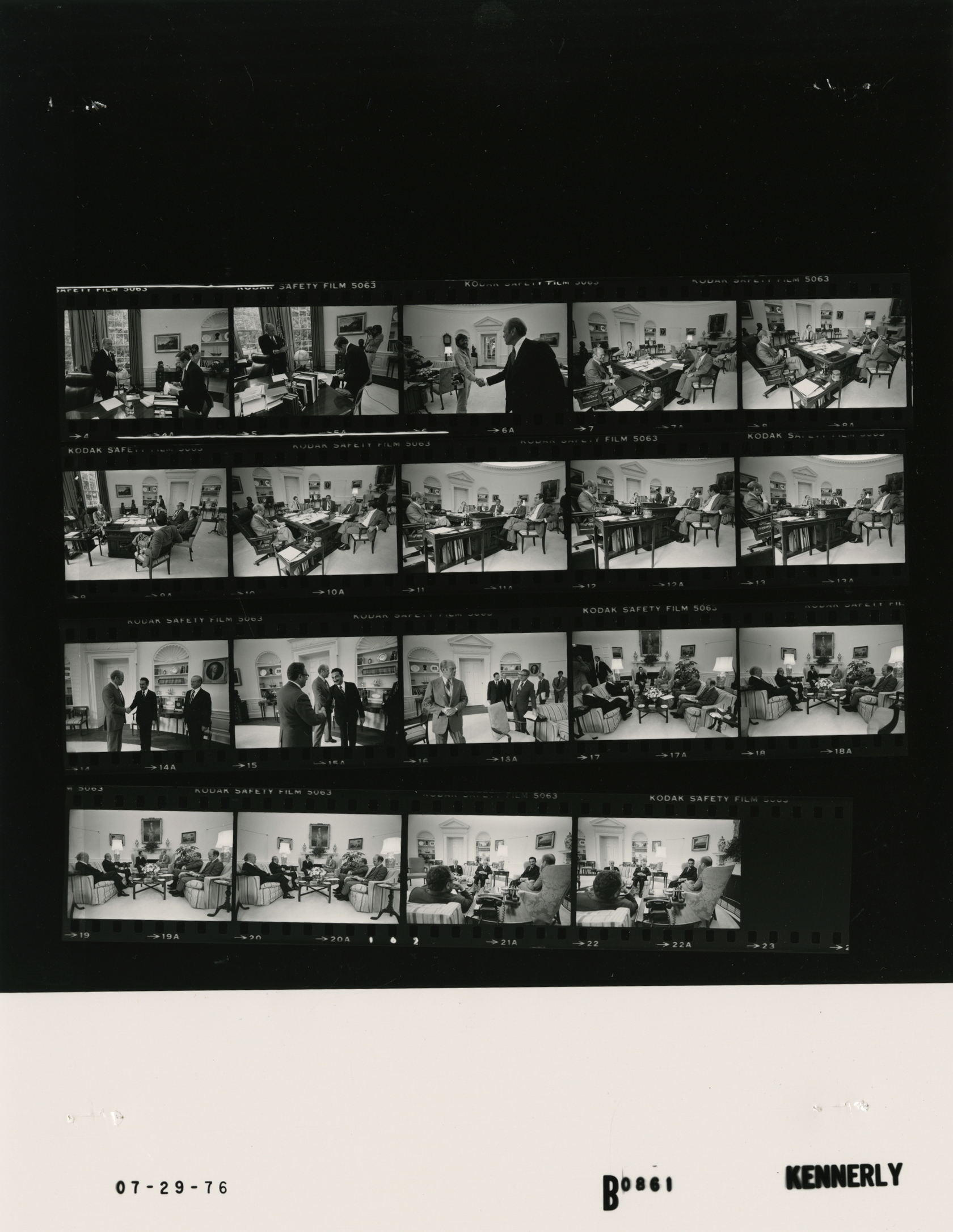
Ecevit and his diplomatic entourage meet with Gerald Ford and Henry Kissinger in the Oval Office, 29 June 1976

After much conflict with his coalition partner and hoping to gain more support for his government through a snap election, Ecevit resigned as prime minister after just 10 months of governing. He was outflanked when the right-wing parties united to form the First Nationalist Front under Demirel's premiership, during which Turkish politics became heavily polarized and violent. The CHP defeated the Justice Party in the 1977 general elections by gathering 41.38% of the votes, the highest share of votes CHP and any other left-wing party has ever gained in Turkish history. Despite winning the election, Ecevit did not have a majority and was unable to form a coalition, so he formed a minority government which lasted just one month. Demirel subsequently took over as prime minister and formed another right-wing government known as the Second Nationalist Front.

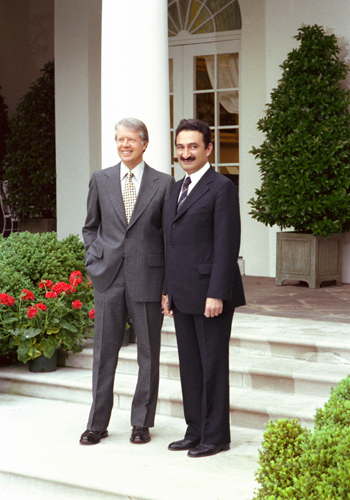
Bülent Ecevit with the President of the United States, Jimmy Carter, at the White House, 31 May 1978.

In what was known as the Güneş Motel Incident, Ecevit was able to bring down Demirel's government on 5 January 1978, after announcing to the press "I am looking for 11 deputies who have no gambling debts." He became prime minister for a third time with a narrow majority by forming a government supported by the Democratic Party, Republican Reliance Party, and 11 independent MPs who defected from the Justice Party to take cabinet positions in the new government. His third premiership was marked by a peak in political violence which manifested in Kahramanmaraş and Malatya against Alevis and CHP supporters and their subsequent reprisals against right wing activists. Ecevit suspected the "Counter-Guerrilla", the Turkish branch of Gladio, was responsible for the massacres and for the Taksim Square massacre in Istanbul, during which snipers fired on a protest rally of 500,000 citizens, killing 38 and injuring hundreds. In later interviews, Ecevit recalled that he first learned about the existence of Operation Gladio, a secret "stay-behind" NATO army, in 1974. His government issued martial law on the final days of December 1978 in thirteen provinces mainly in southeastern Turkey, but also in Istanbul and Ankara. With allegations of corruption between Ecevit and the independent MPs, TÜSİAD requesting his resignation by printing advertisements on newspapers, and defeat in the 1979 by-elections, Ecevit resigned as prime minister on 14 October 1979. Without a majority, Demirel returned as premier. In the lead up to another military intervention in 1980, parliament attempted 115 times to vote for a new president.

==== Assassination attempts ====
Bülent Ecevit was subject to six assassination attempts. All but one occurred in the 1970s. Five happened in Turkey and one in the United States, the most famous of which took place on 23 July 1976 in New York City by a Greek Cypriot and on 29 May 1977 at Çiğli Airport. Mehmet İsvan, brother of the Mayor of Istanbul Ahmet İsvan, was injured in the attempt in Çiğli Airport.

== Ban from politics ==
On 12 September 1980 the Turkish Armed Forces seized control of the country. Bülent and Rahşan and most politicians were incarcerated for a month in Hamzaköy, Gelibolu. Along with politicians of all other parties Ecevit was banned from politics for ten years, with the provisional Article 4 of the new constitution. He resigned from the chairmanship of the CHP on 30 October 1980. The Republican People's Party and all other existing political parties were banned by the military. He was banned from traveling abroad in April 1981 for his opposition to the military rule. He was twice more imprisoned from December 1981 to February 1982 and August to October 1982 for his opposition to the junta.

This ban on politics did not stop Ecevit from continuing to participate in politics. He refused to associate himself with the successor parties created by old CHP supporters, like the Populist Party and Social Democracy Party. Instead his wife Rahşan Ecevit worked to establish a new political party: the Democratic Left Party (DSP). Bülent was often invited to speak in DSP rallies as a guest speaker. Many lawsuits filed against him on the grounds that he violated his ban on politics with his speeches. When the Populist Party and Social Democracy Party united under the name of the Social Democrat Populist Party (SHP) in November 1985 the Ecevits were criticized for refusing to also merge DSP with SHP, which served to divide the center-left, social-democratic/Kemalist votes.

== DSP chairman ==
With his ban from politics being finally lifted in a referendum in 1987, he took over the chairmanship of DSP, inheriting the position from Rahşan. His party failed to enter the Grand National Assembly for polling below 10% in the general elections held two months later, so Ecevit briefly resigned before returning as DSP leader in 1989. Emphasizing the need to preserve national unity and secularism in the general elections held in 1991, he attacked SHP, saying "Do not divide the social democratic votes." He also criticized SHP for forming an electoral alliance with the new pro-Kurdish People's Labor Party, and claimed that the SHP "cooperated with the separatists". Despite his partial Kurdish heritage, Ecevit refused to recognize Kurds as an ethnic group in his speeches, and would repeatedly oppose legislation to legalize education in Kurdish and Kurdish television. This stance mellowed upon European pressure when he returned to power in 1999. Despite winning 11% of the vote in the election, Ecevit and only six other DSP deputies entered the Grand National Assembly.

With the ban on the name "Republican People's Party" and the acronym "CHP" now lifted, an initiative to reestablish the CHP came to the agenda. Ecevit was invited to the 1992 congress that refounded the CHP, but he did not attend. While SHP merged under the reconstituted CHP in 1995, he again objected to uniting the Kemalist parties. To this day, DSP remains a separate political party from CHP.

DSP's fortunes changed after the 1995 elections, when the party won 76 seats out of 550. Ecevit served as deputy prime minister for two years in Mesut Yılmaz's government, who was assigned to form a government after Necmettin Erbakan was overthrown by the military in the "postmodern coup". In 1999, after nearly twenty years, he returned to the premiership for the last time to form a minority government in the run-up to the 1999 general elections. In those elections – helped by the fact that Abdullah Öcalan, head of the PKK, was apprehended in Kenya and flown to Turkey during this period – Ecevit's party gained the largest number of seats, allowing him to stay as prime minister in a coalition with Yılmaz's centrist Motherland Party and Devlet Bahçeli's ultranationalist MHP. Ecevit's coalition partners offered to amend the constitution to allow for his presidential candidacy in the 2000 election, which he wasn't allowed to partake since he never attained a degree from a higher educational institution. Despite his popularity and parliament willing to amend the Constitution for his candidacy, he refused, instead opting to support the candidacy of independent politician Ahmet Necdet Sezer.

=== Last premiership (1999–2002) ===
==== Domestic policy ====
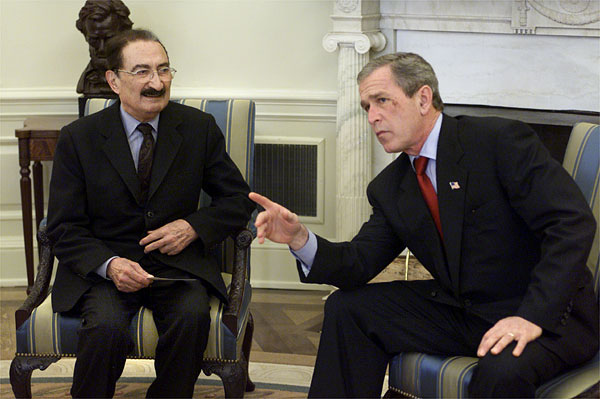
Bülent Ecevit with American President George W. Bush

Ecevit's last premiership was his longest at almost four years. In coalition with parties to his right, some which were old foes such as MHP –Ecevit was also appointed PM by his old rival who was now president, Süleyman Demirel– he was criticized for adopting pro-business policies and abandoning his leftist values. The government passed many important laws, including banking reform, unemployment insurance, a law to ensure the autonomy of the Central Bank, qualified industrial zones, tender law, and employment incentive law, to name a few. The government also amended 34 articles of the Constitution to widen fundamental rights and freedoms and undertook a number of reforms aimed at stabilizing the Turkish economy. These were in preparation for accession negotiations with the European Union. Ecevit acknowledged that his past anti-EU views were a mistake, and that Turkey's destiny with Europe. His foreign minister İsmail Cem was instrumental in what is currently the latest step of Turkish–EU accession, when in the Helsinki Summit in December 1999, Turkey was recognized as a full candidate country for the European Union. Three major EU harmonisation packages were passed during this government, including the most comprehensive package of August 2002, which included the abolishment of capital punishment. However progress to EU ascension inevitably hit a roadblock, that being of his making; the Cyprus Dispute.

A massive economic crisis which originated from long overdue problems from previous governments, but ultimately triggered by an incident where President Sezer threw a booklet of the Turkish constitution at Ecevit in a National Security Council meeting, specifically when he claimed economic reform was impossible, caused the value of the Lira to crash in February 2001. Two months later, Ahmet Çakmak, a florist who was struggling from the economic crisis and inspired by Sezer's outburst, ran in front of news cameras and shouted "Mr. Prime Minister, I am a tradesman!" throwing a cash register at Ecevit's direction as he was walking out of a cabinet meeting. Eventually Ecevit hired the World Bank economist Kemal Derviş his economic minister. With his guidance, the government passed an extensive series of comprehensive economic reforms and regulations. These included changes to the tender law, economic social council law, unemployment insurance, the restructuring of state banks, accreditation law, law on capital markets, and establishment of competition authorities. These successful reforms allowed for Derviş to sign off on a $20 billion loan from the International Monetary Fund, which enabled the high growth of 2002–2007 after DSP's fall from government.

The Kocaeli earthquake occurred 17 August 1999, killing tens of thousands in Istanbul and İzmit and causing billions in damages. A tax to prevent earthquake damage (also known as the Earthquake tax) was established after the disaster.

During this period, the "Law of Conditional Release and Postponement," also known as the Rahşan Amnesty, was passed in reaction to the large amount of hunger strikes occurring in prison, which gave conditional amnesty to crimes other than those committed against the state. Advocated for by Rahşan Ecevit, she commented on the outcome of her law in retrospect, saying "I asked for forgiveness for the poor, [instead] the murderers benefited." With this amnesty, the number of prisoners decreased from 70,000 to 40,000, but in three years it increased again to 64,000.

==== Foreign policy ====
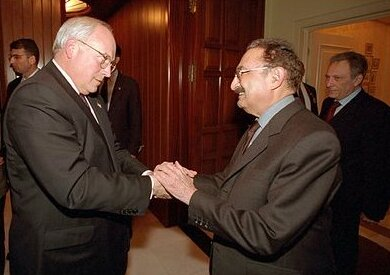
Bülent Ecevit and US Vice President Dick Cheney

Bülent Ecevit was a strong opponent of the invasion of Iraq by the US, though he allowed American planes to use bases in Turkey for their air patrols over Northern Iraq. Even still, he criticized American sanctions on Iraq, which he said caused needless suffering.

Ecevit maintained Turkey's relationship with Israel, but denounced the IDF's raid on the Jenin refugee camp as "genocide" which he later said was meant against both Israel and Fatah.

İsmail Cem achieved a period of rapprochement with Greece after relations were at an all-time low following the Öcalan affair.

==== Health concerns and government collapse ====
Rumors about Bülent Ecevit's ill health were confirmed when he was taken to Başkent University Ankara Hospital on 4 May 2002, which became a source of national anxiety. He was taken out of the hospital by Rahşan and brought to their home when his condition worsened. Bülent rested at home, but was taken back to the hospital. Rahşan shared her doubts about her husband's treatment with public during this period. Her allegations were denied, but the issue was brought up again in the Ergenekon trials in the following years.

Discussions came to the fore whether Ecevit could continue governing while incapacitated. Nine deputies from the DSP issued a statement on 25 June, demanding "to lead a life without Ecevit under the leadership of Ecevit". Another group of DSP deputies, who made a press statement on behalf of him on 5 July, openly criticized Deputy Prime Minister Hüsamettin Özkan, one of the closest names to Ecevit. On 7 July, Bahçeli withdrew support from the coalition, and called for early elections. The next day, Özkan resigned, which was followed by the resignation of several ministers and half of DSP's parliamentary group, with most of them joining the New Turkey Party, founded by foreign minister Cem. With the resignations, the coalition government lost its numerical support in the parliament. A summit held on 16 July between the leaders of the coalition government resulted in the decision to hold early elections on 3 November 2002. In the vote held in parliament on at the end of July, 449 out of 514 deputies voted to hold an early election.

Allegations of corruption, the economic crisis, as well as Ecevit's poor health resulted in DSP facing electoral wipeout in the 2002 general election, attaining only 1.2% of the vote and losing all of its MPs. The Justice and Development Party (AKP) entered parliament with a comfortable majority and governs Turkey to this day. In a press conference held on 25 July 2004 Ecevit announced Zeki Sezer as his successor to DSP, and resigned as chairman. He officially left active politics in summer, and devoted his remaining years to writing.

== Illness and death ==
Ecevit and his wife Rahşan Ecevit's tomb at the State Cemetery in Ankara, Turkey

After attending the funeral of his friend Yücel Özbilgin, who was killed in the Turkish Council of State shooting on 19 May 2006, he suffered a cerebral hemorrhage, went into a coma and stayed in the intensive care unit of the Gülhane Military Medical Academy for a long time. Ecevit died of circulatory and respiratory failure at 22:40 on Sunday, 5 November 2006, 172 days after he entered a vegetative state.

Immediately after his death the Grand National Assembly passed a law to allow for prime ministers and speakers of parliament to also be buried in the Turkish State Cemetery (Turkish: Devlet Mezarlığı) in Ankara, which allowed Bülent to be buried there. Upon the death of Bülent Ecevit's wife Rahşan in January 2020, the parliament voted to also have civilians be buried in the State Cemetery, allowing her to be interred there too.

A state funeral was held on 11 November 2006 at the State Cemetery after a funeral prayer in Kocatepe Mosque, attended by approximately a million people from all 81 provinces and from many countries, especially from Northern Cyprus. Five former presidents also attended the funeral.

== Controversies ==
=== Relationship with the Gülen movement ===
Against the advice of the Turkish military, Ecevit visited Fethullah Gülen's schools and spoke highly of them. In 1997, the Journalists and Writers Foundation, of which Gülen was an honorary chairman of, presented Ecevit (and Demirel) with the "Award for National Reconciliation in the Field of Politics".

During the escalation of the 1997 military memorandum crisis, Chief Public Prosecutor Nuh Mete Yüksel prepared an indictment against Gülen. Footage of Gülen's speeches years ago were broadcast on a multitude of television channels in which Gülen presented about "how they [the Gülen movement] should be structured in the bureaucracy". Questioned about Gülen's statement later on, Prime Minister Ecevit defended Gülen in an interview, saying that he hasn't seen any suspicious behavior in his schools, which provide secular education inline to the principles of Atatürk.

While deputy prime minister, Ecevit requested the Italian Ambassador to greet Gülen when he went to Rome in 1998, which drew a reaction from general Çevik Bir.

=== Merve Kavakçı ===
In the inaugural session of the 21st parliament elected in 1999, Merve Kavakçı entered the Grand National Assembly's chamber with a headscarf, which violated Turkey's then strictly enforced laicité laws. DSP deputies protested her entrance, graveling their benches and shouting "out!" Ecevit eventually came up to the podium:

No one interferes with women's clothing, headscarves and private lives in Turkey. However, this is not a private living space. This is the highest institution of the state. Those who work here have to abide by the rules and traditions of the state. This is a challenge to the state! This is not the place to challenge! Please put this lady in her place!

Kavakçı did not show up to the second session of parliament, and her MP status was later terminated.

== Personality ==
=== Trademarks ===
Bülent Ecevit's trademark was his blue shirt and mariner's cap. Another trademark of his was the dove, in his many campaign rallies Ecevit released doves into the air. The dove is also displayed on the logo of DSP. He smoked Bitlis and Parliament cigarettes and wrote with an Erika typewriter, a gift from his in-law, İsmail Hakkı Okday. He donated his 70-year-old typewriter to the METU Science and Technology Museum.

Bülent and Rahşan lived exceptionally modestly and frugally. They had no children.

=== Nicknames ===
The origin of Ecevit's popular nickname "Karaoğlan" (a Turkish folk hero) came in a visit to Kars. Shortly after his election as CHP chairman, when found himself guest in the house of his friend Rasim Yarkadaş in Susuz district. Rasim's mother welcomed her guest at the door of their house, hugging Ecevit and exclaiming in a distinct Kars dialect, "Save us from these troubles, Garaoğlan!" (Note: Altered orthography is likely due to the fact that some eastern Turkish accents partially merge /k/ and /g/.) He also had the nickname "Halkçı Ecevit" (Populist Ecevit).

Süleyman Demirel used the nickname "Allende-Büllende" to compare his rival, Ecevit, to the Chilean socialist statesman Salvador Allende, who was overthrown and committed suicide in a military coup.

Ecevit was also known as Kıbrıs Fatihi "Conqueror of Cyprus" after the Cyprus Operation during his premiership, and also as Kenya Fatihi "Conqueror of Kenya" after the operation to capture Abdullah Öcalan.

== Legacy ==
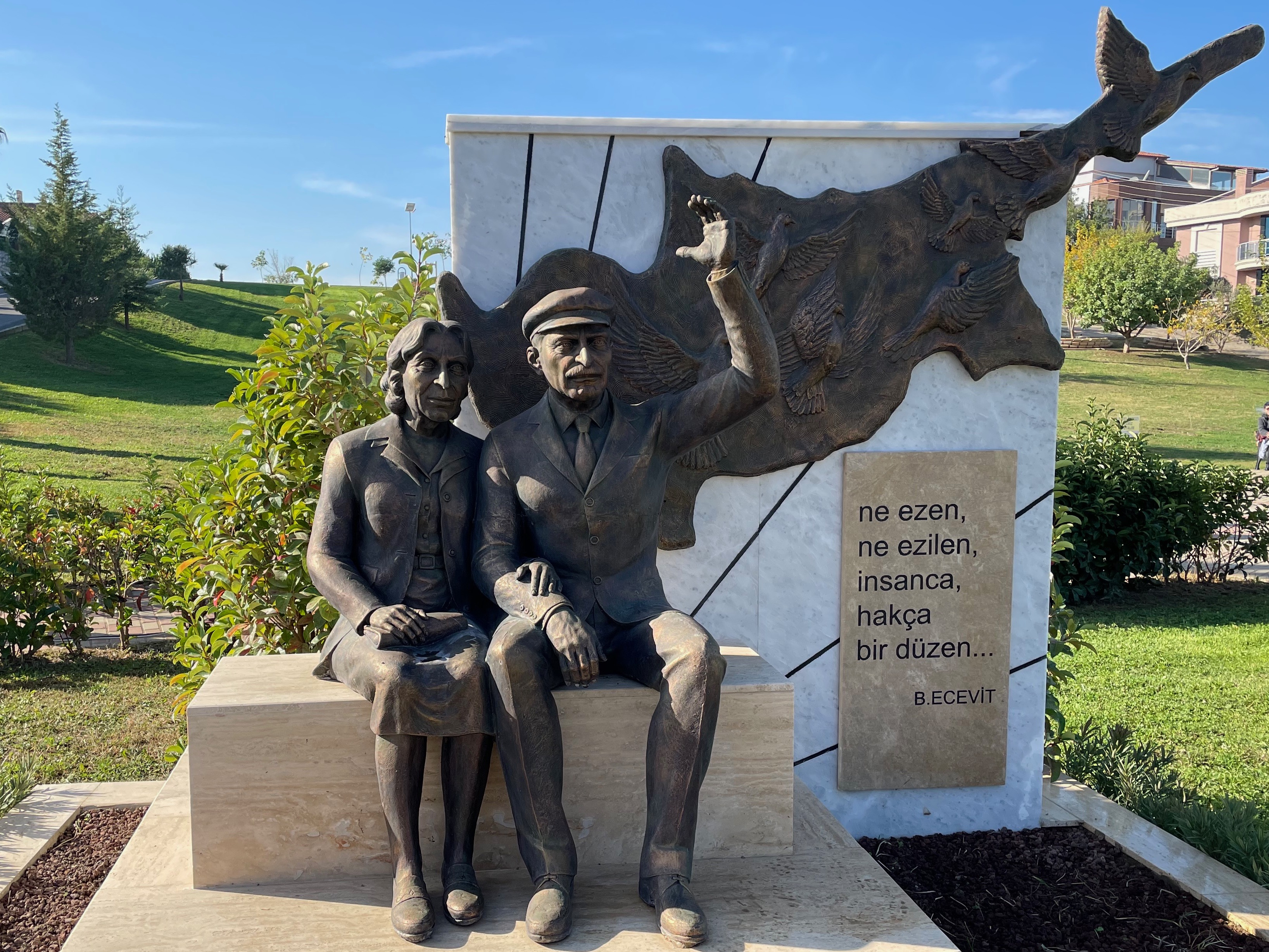
Monument in İzmir to Bülent and Rahşan Ecevit and the Cyprus operation

Ecevit holds a unique legacy in Turkey's political history for being its only left-wing prime minister. There has also been no Kemalist prime ministers since his last government. He was also the last prime minister from the CHP. His chairmanship resulted in the highest shares of votes CHP and any other left-wing party have ever gained in Turkish history. He was the last leader of Turkey before the AKP came into power at his expense in 2002, which has governed Turkey since. Ecevit's DSP-MHP-ANAP government was the longest lasting coalition government in Turkish history.

Kartal Bülent Ecevit Cultural Center was put into service in 2005. In 2012 the name of Zonguldak Karaelmas University was changed to “Zonguldak Bülent Ecevit University." A wax sculpture of him is on display at the Tayfun Talipoğlu Typewriter Museum, which was opened in Odunpazarı, Eskişehir in May 2016. In 2021, a park in İzmir's Güzelbahçe district was named after him and his statue was erected.

Vurgun Adalayı portrayed Bülent Ecevit in the TV series Once Upon a Time in Cyprus.

Ahmet Çakmak, who threw a cash register at Ecevit in 2001 out of frustration from the economic crisis said the following twenty years later: “Ecevit understood the state of the citizen. After the incident, he talked to me many times and sought a solution. If we did something like this now, we would be [called] terrorists. I miss Ecevit, I visited his grave at least 20 times."

In the lead up to the 2023 general elections, DSP chairman Önder Aksakal came out in support Recep Tayyip Erdoğan's presidential candidacy and was elected from the AKP's lists in the 2023 general elections. The Rahşan-Bülent Ecevit Science Culture and Art Foundation stated that [today's] DSP has no connection with Ecevit's principles that "they should not pollute the names of Ecevit for their own interests."

== Works ==
=== Poetry ===
- Şiirler. [Poems]. 1976
- Işığı Taştan Oydum. [I Carved the Light from the Stone]. Tekin Yayınevi. 1978
- El Ele Büyüttük Sevgiyi. [We Grew Love Hand in Hand]. 1997
- Bir Şeyler Olacak Yarın. [Something Will Happen Tomorrow]. Doğan Kitapçılık. 2005

=== Books ===
- Ortanın Solu. [Left of Center]. 1966
- Bu Düzen Değişmelidir. [This Order Must Change]. 1968
- Atatürk ve Devrimcilik. [Atatürk and Revolutionism]. 1970
- Kurultaylar ve Sonrası. [Congresses and the After]. 1972
- Demokratik Sol ve Hükümet Bunalımı. [Democratic Left and the Crisis of Government]. 1974
- Demokratik Solda Temel Kavramlar ve Sorunlar. [Basic Issues and Solutions in the Democratic Left]. 1975
- Dış Politika. [Foreign Policy]. 1975
- Dünya-Türkiye-Milliyetçilik. [World-Turkey-Nationalism]. 1975
- Toplum-Siyaset-Yönetim. [Society-Politics-Governance]. 1975
- İşçi-Köylü El Ele. [Worker-Peasant Hand in Hand]. 1976
- Türkiye / 1965–1975. 1976
- Umut Yılı: 1977. [Year of Hope]. 1977

=== Translations ===
- Rabindranath Tagore, Gitanjali (1941)
- Rabindranath Tagore, Stray Birds (1943)
- T. S. Eliot, The Cocktail Party (1963)

== See also ==
- Ecevitism

== Bibliography ==
=== References ===
Party political offices
Preceded by İsmet İnönü	Leader of the Republican's People Party (CHP); 14 May 1972 – 29 October 1980	Succeeded by 1980 Military coup and later Deniz Baykal
Preceded by Rahşan Ecevit	Leader of the Democratic Left Party (DSP); 13 Sep 1987–1988	Succeeded by Necdet Karababa
Preceded by Necdet Karababa	Leader of the Democratic Left Party (DSP); 1989–25 Jul 2004	Succeeded by Zeki Sezer
Political offices
Preceded by Naim Talu	Prime Minister of Turkey; 26 January 1974 – 17 November 1974	Succeeded by Sadi Irmak
Preceded by Süleyman Demirel	Prime Minister of Turkey; 21 June 1977 – 21 July 1977	Succeeded by Süleyman Demirel
Preceded by Süleyman Demirel	Prime Minister of Turkey; 5 January 1978 – 12 November 1979	Succeeded by Süleyman Demirel
Preceded by Tansu Çiller	Deputy Prime Minister of Turkey; 30 June 1997 – 11 January 1999	Succeeded by Hüsamettin Özkan; Hikmet Uluğbay
Preceded by Mesut Yılmaz	Prime Minister of Turkey; 11 January 1999 – 19 November 2002	Succeeded by Abdullah Gül
Preceded by Kemal Satır	Secretary-General of the Republican People's Party; 1966–1971	Succeeded by Şeref Bakşık
