= Nazlı Ecevit =

Turkish painter

- Born: 4 January 1900; Istanbul, Ottoman Empire
- Died: 14 August 1985 (aged 85); Ankara, Turkey
- Resting place: Cebeci Asri Cemetery, Ankara
- Education: Teaching, painting
- Style: Realism-Impressionism
- Spouse: Fahri Ecevit (m. 1924; died 1951)
- Children: Bülent Ecevit

Fatma Nazlı Ecevit (4 January 1900 – 14 August 1985) was a Turkish school teacher and a realist-impressionist painter. She was the mother of Prime Minister Bülent Ecevit.

== Early life ==
Fatma Nazlı Ecevit was born in Istanbul, as Constantinople the then capital of the Ottoman Empire, on 4 January 1900. Her father was Emin Sargut, a colonel, her paternal grandfather Salih Pasha, a major general (Ottoman Turkish: Ferik) and her maternal grandfather Kirat Pasha, an aide to the Ottoman Sultan She was of Bosniak ancestry.

After she graduated from the Çapa Teacher's School for Girls (Ottoman Turkish: Çapa İnas Dar-ül muallimat) in 1915, Mihri Müşfik, one of the first Turkish women painters, encouraged her to develop her interest in painting. She went on to study at the Fine Arts School for Girls (Ottoman Turkish: İnas Sanayi-i Nefise Mektebi) between 1915 and 1922, where she was taught by Ömer Adil, and joined the workshop of Feyhaman Duran. As the graduating examinations for the Fine Arts School for Girls were cancelled due to the Turkish War of Independence, she obtained a teaching certificate.

== Years as teacher ==
Nazlı was employed as a painting teacher at Beşiktaş Junior High School for Girls. She then followed her father to Kastamonu in Anatolia, and suspended her painting career for 25 years. She first taught in Kastamonu, and later in Bolu and İzmit.

She married in 1924 and moved to Ankara. The next year, she gave birth to a son, Bülent, who went on to become a political party leader and four times prime minister. She worked as an art teacher in the Ankara Teachers' School of Music, the forerunner of the Hacettepe University Ankara State Conservatory. She also taught in the Istanbul Master Junior High School. Her career as teacher lasted for nineteen years.

== Painting career ==
Nazlı resumed painting in 1947. She had shown her works at the Galatasaray Expositions during her student years and resumed doing so at group exhibitions after 1947. She also held private exhibitions. During her student years, she painted portraits and nudes. From 1948 to 1975, her works were displayed almost every year at the State Art and Sculpture Exhibition.

Her works present a realist and impressionist style that she developed in the Fine Arts Union, of which she was a member and for some time also its chairperson. Her style resembles that of Turkish painters of the 1930s' generation like İbrahim Çallı, Şeref Akdik, Ali Karsan and Adil Doğançay and she had a powerful sense of design. After 1947, she painted mostly landscapes and still lifes, combining the soft and colourful sensitivity of the impressionist style in landscape paintings of Salacak, the Bosphorus in Istanbul and Bursa with a realist look at local atmosphere. She worked in oils, watercolours, crayon and charcoal. Her impressionism was based on a tradition transmitted via military painters in Turkey.

== Health issues and death ==
By June 1985, Nazlı was hospitalised in Istanbul, where she lived, due to diabetes and urinary problems. Later, she was transferred to Ankara, where her son Bülent Ecevit resided. On 14 August 1985, she died at the age of 85 in the hospital of Hacettepe University, where she was being treated. She was interred at Cebeci Asri Cemetery following a funeral service at the Hacı Bayram Mosque.

== Works ==
Her notable paintings include:

- Keriman Hanım'ın Portresi (Portrait of Kerman Hanım), (1922) İstanbul State Art and Sculpture Museum
- Çiçekler (Flowers), İstanbul State Art and Sculpture Museum
- Çamlıcan'dan Görünüm (View from Çamlıca)
- Balkonlu Manzara (Landscape with Balcony)
- Bebek (Baby), (sold in April 2000 for approx. US$19,200)
- Salacakta Kız Kulesi (Maiden's Tower at Salacak), (sold in June for approx. US$23,200)
- Boğaziçi (Bosporus), (1954) (sold in June 2000 for approx. US$8,000)

Recep Tayyip Erdoğan had one of her oil paintings named Salacak hung in the office building of the prime minister in July 2003 after he took office in the March of that year.
