= Erika typewriter =

German portable typewriter

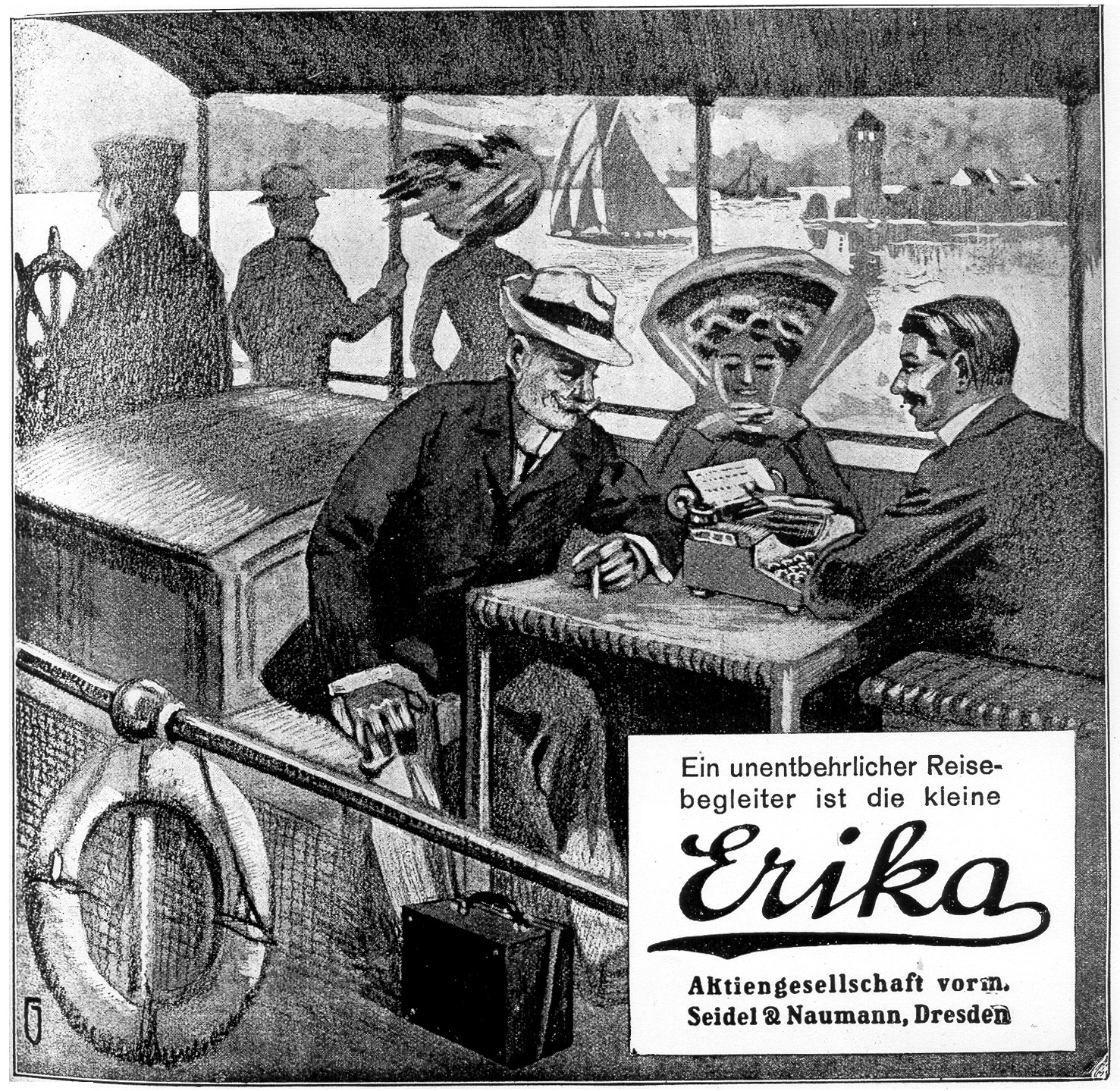
An advertisement of the first Erika, 1910

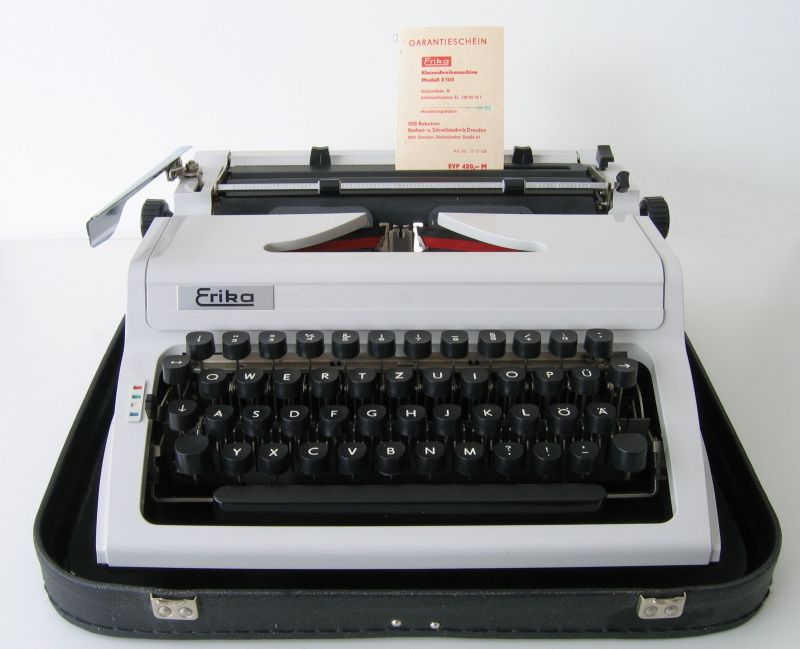
Erika-100, 1984

Erika was a brand of mechanical portable typewriters designed by the German company Seidel & Naumann in 1910. Its production continued in the East Germany until 1990, by the nationalized factory, eventually incorporated into VEB Robotron. In 1990 the factory was privatized as Robotron Erika GmbH, which ceased production in 1991.

The typewriter was named after Naumann's granddaughter.

Imported in the Soviet Union, Erika was used in samizdat, as immortalized in a song of Soviet dissident poet Alexander Galich:

«Эрика» берёт четыре копии,
Вот и всё! А этого достаточно!»

(" 'Erika' takes four copies, and that's all! But that's enough!")

== Special models ==
- Erika 8, the first model with lever-set tab stops (positioner, Setztabulator)
- Erika Picht (1975), with Braille keyboard
- Erika S 6009 (1981), the first electronic model
