= Karadeniz TV =

- Country: Turkey
- Headquarters: Turkey

Programming
- Language: Turkish

History
- Launched: 18 May 2005

Links
- Website: www.karadeniztv.com.tr

Karadeniz TV is a Turkish nationwide TV channel established in 2005. It has a sister radio station, Karadeniz FM, launched in 1994.

It covered the 2013 protests in Turkey.
