= Maltepe University =

University in Maltepe district, Istanbul, Turkey

- Maltepe Üniversitesi
- Motto: "Free in thought, modern in science"
- Type: Private university
- Established: July 9, 1997
- Rector: Prof. Dr. Edibe Sözen
- Administrative staff: 1124
- Location: Maltepe, Istanbul, Turkey; 40°57′35″N 29°11′39″E
- Campus: Rural (Maltepe Education Village, Dragos, Faculty of Medicine)
- Founder: Istanbul Marmara Education Foundation (İMEV)
- Website: www.maltepe.edu.tr/en

Maltepe University (Turkish: Maltepe Üniversitesi) is a private university located in Maltepe district of Istanbul, Turkey. It was established on July 9, 1997 by "Istanbul Marmara Education Foundation" (İMEV). The institution has a broad scope of education starting from the elementary level to university.

== Medium of teaching ==
Turkish is chosen as the medium of teaching, unlike many other private universities in Turkey, with the belief that an individual can best learn and perform in the mother tongue. However, having the awareness that English is indispensable in the international scientific arena, the university includes an English teaching program. Those students who are not exempt in the proficiency exam of the English language department enroll in the two-semester intensive English preparatory program. All students take compulsory English courses during their undergraduate education.

== Academic programs ==
Undergraduate programs

- Faculty of paedagogy (psychological guidance, English language)
- Faculty of natural sciences and literature (philosophy, mathematics, psychology)
- Faculty of fine arts (acting, film, plastic arts, cartoon making-animation, photography)
- Faculty of law
- Faculty of economics and business administration (economics, business administration, international relations and European Union)
- Faculty of communication sciences (visual communication and design, public relations and publicity, radio-cinema-TV)
- Faculty of architecture (interior decoration, architecture)
- Faculty of engineering (computer engineering, electronics, industrial engineering, civil engineering)
- Faculty of medicine (Nursing)

Vocational school

- Radio–TV programming
- Tourism and hotel management
- Computer technology and programming
- Film production techniques

Post-graduate and doctorate programs

- Institute of social sciences (education administration, economics policy, business administration, law, psychology, human sciences, philosophy, radio-cinema-TV)
- Institute of natural sciences (computer science, industrial engineering, mathematics, architecture, civil engineering-earthquake engineering)

General

- Atatürk's reforms and history of the Republic of Turkey
- Foreign languages

== Academic staff ==
As of 2025 academic year, the university holds 1124 teaching staff.

== Campus ==
Maltepe University has three campuses. The main campus in Maltepe Eğitim Köyü (Maltepe Education Village), located at Maltepe, Büyükbakkalköy, was opened in September 2003. The President's Office and administrative units are situated on this campus, which extends over an area of 100 hectares comprising faculty buildings, indoor/outdoor sports facilities, an olympic-size swimming pool and student social activities centers.

The university's Dragos campus is located at Dragos, close to the shore on an area of 15,000 m^{2}. The Vocational School, The Science Institute, The Social Sciences Institute and The Continuous Education Center are all located on this campus.

The Faculty of medicine and its hospital, which serves its students as an application hospital, are both located in Maltepe, on the campus where the university was first founded.

=== Library ===
The Library and Information Center has +200,000 printed books, more than 300,000 electronic books, 1,975 different printed, +320,000 electronic journals, +3,000 master's and doctoral theses, +3,200,000 electronic resources. The center has 12 separate special collections consisting of books by Türkiye's leading scientists and well-known figures. The classification system in the library is in the transition phase from the "Dewey Decimal Classification System" to the Library of Congress Classification System. In order of establishment; Prof. Dr. Nermi Uygur Library, Dr. Halidun-Seba Şen Library, Armağan Yüksel Library, Prof. Dr. Erkut Özel Library, Nail Güreli Library, Arif Hikmet Par Library, and M. Türker Acaroğlu Library are located as separate sections within the library. Vedat Günyol Library is located in a separate location on campus. The oldest publication in the rare books collection is dated 1642. This collection mainly includes works covering the history of the Middle East, Turkey, Europe, and foreign relations of the 18th and 19th centuries.

== Affiliations ==
The university is a member of the Caucasus University Association.

== Gallery ==
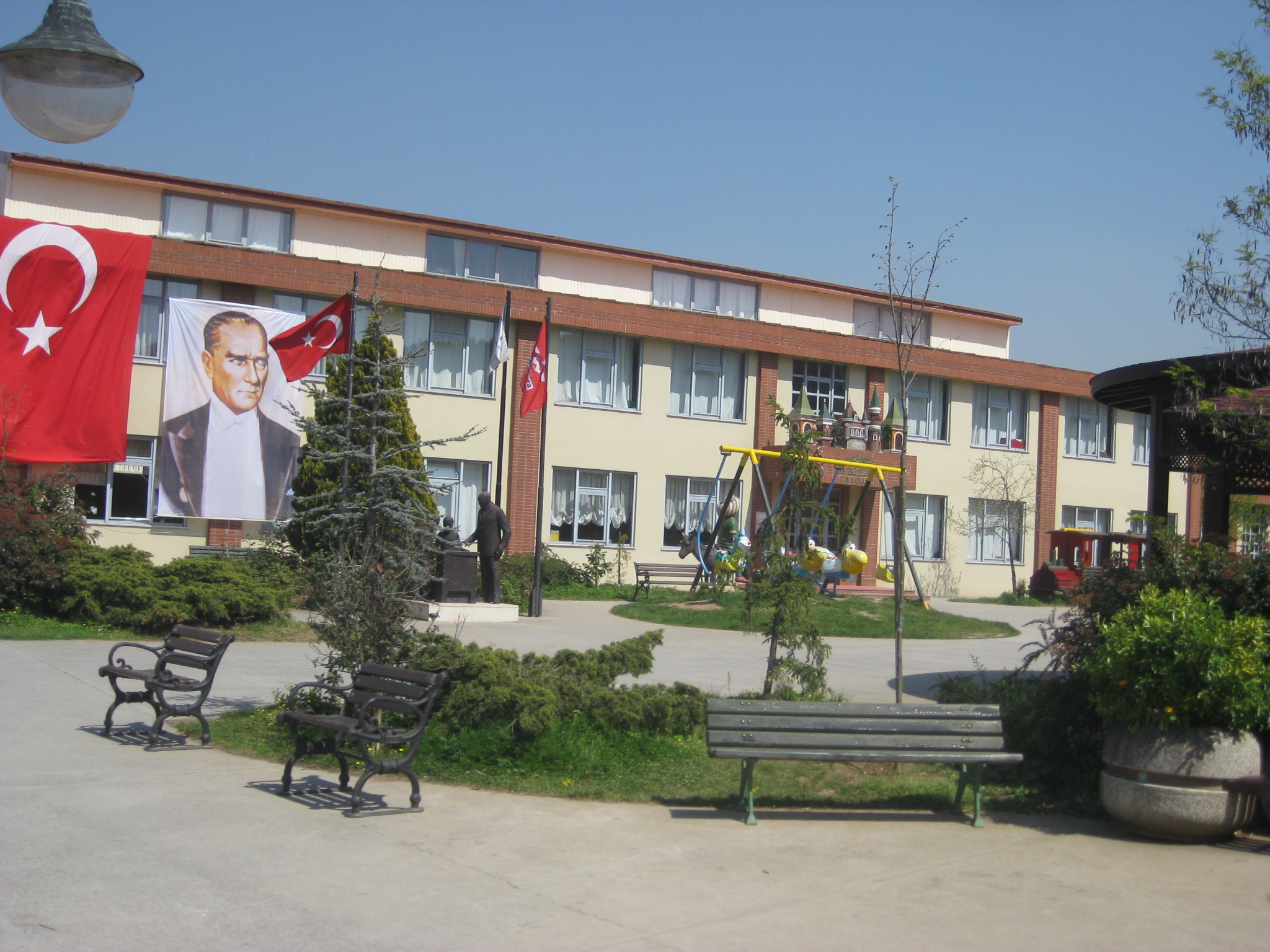
Kindergarten

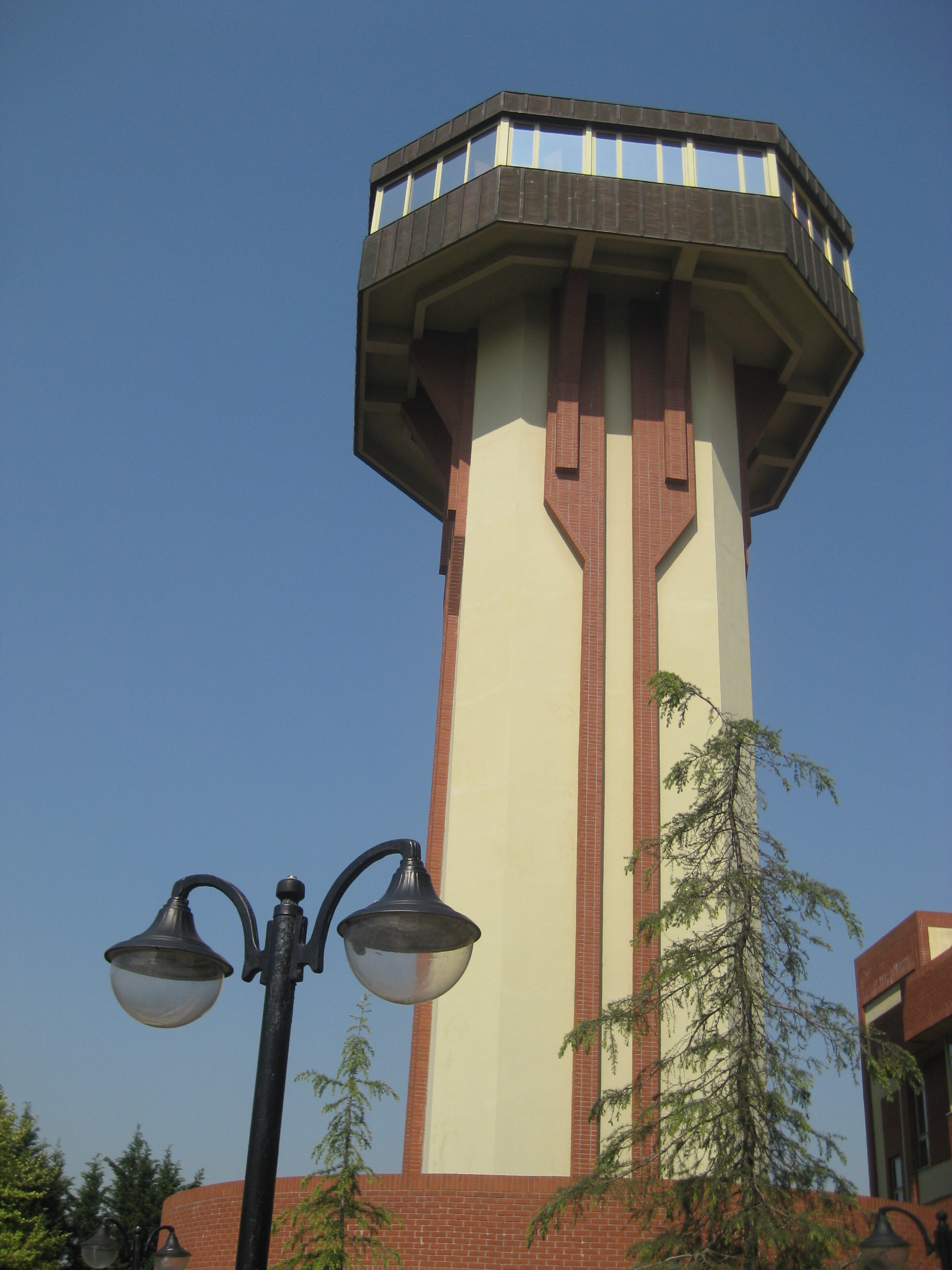
Watch tower

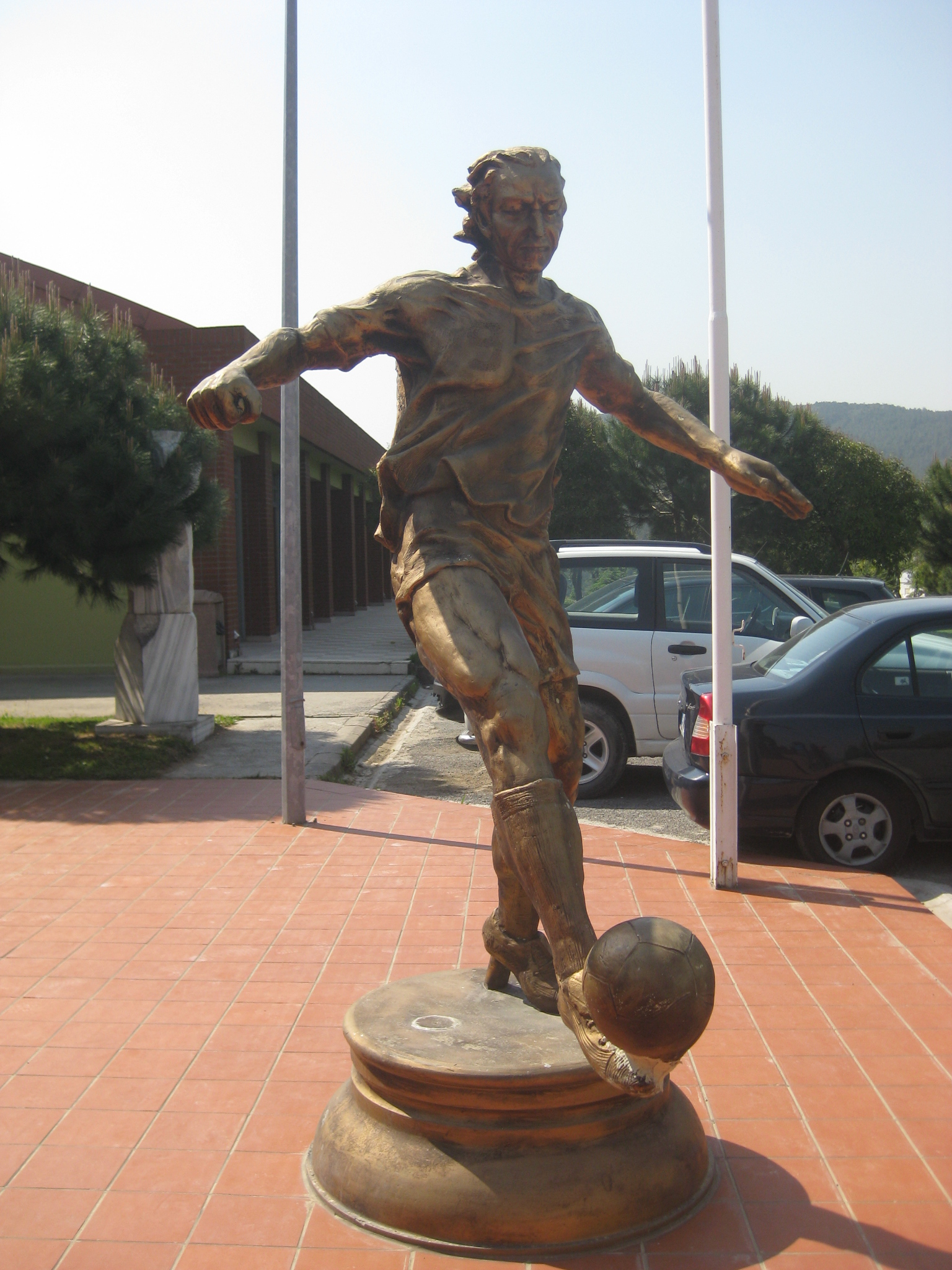
Statue of a footballer in sports facility gate.

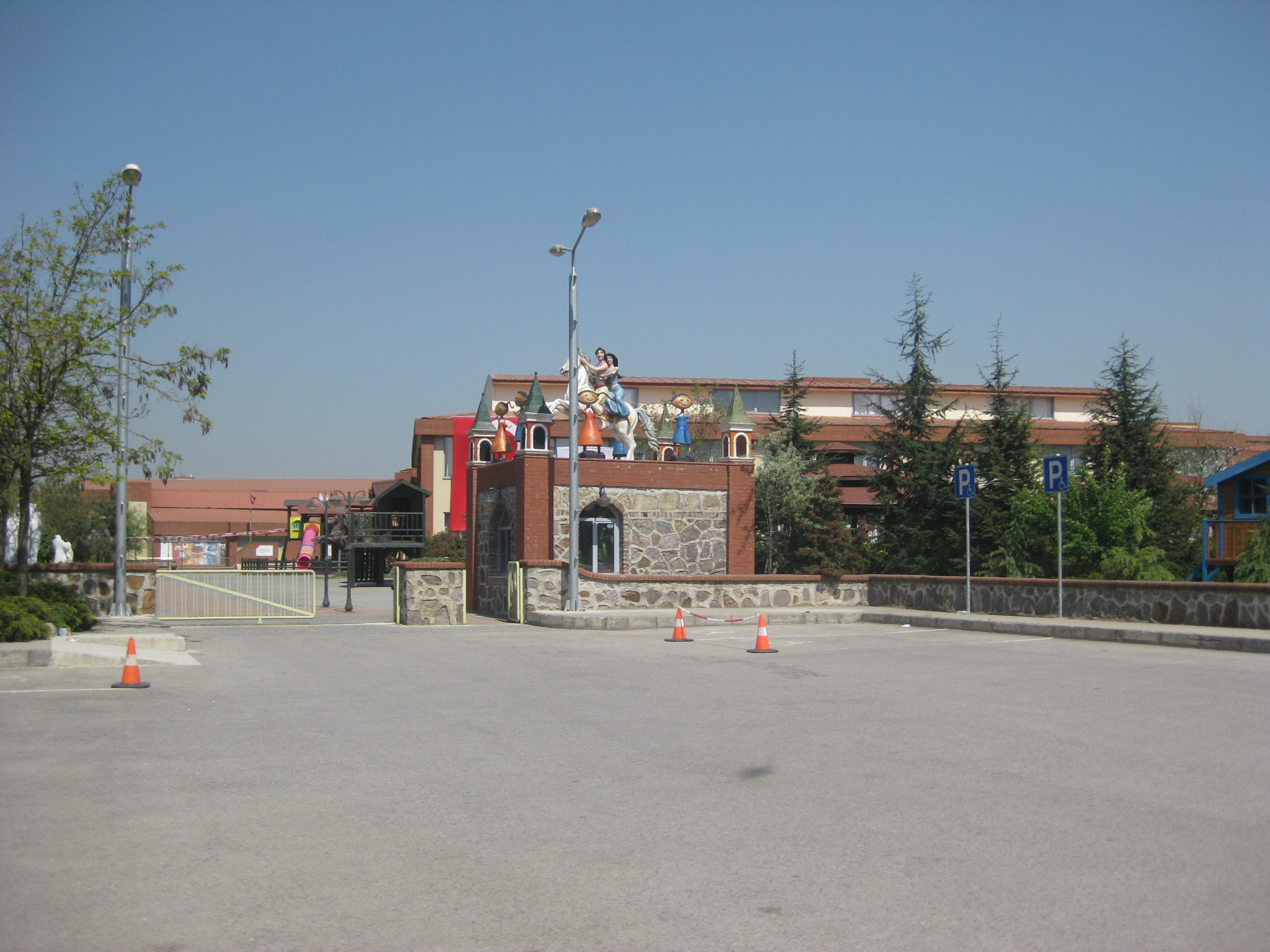
Kindergarten gate

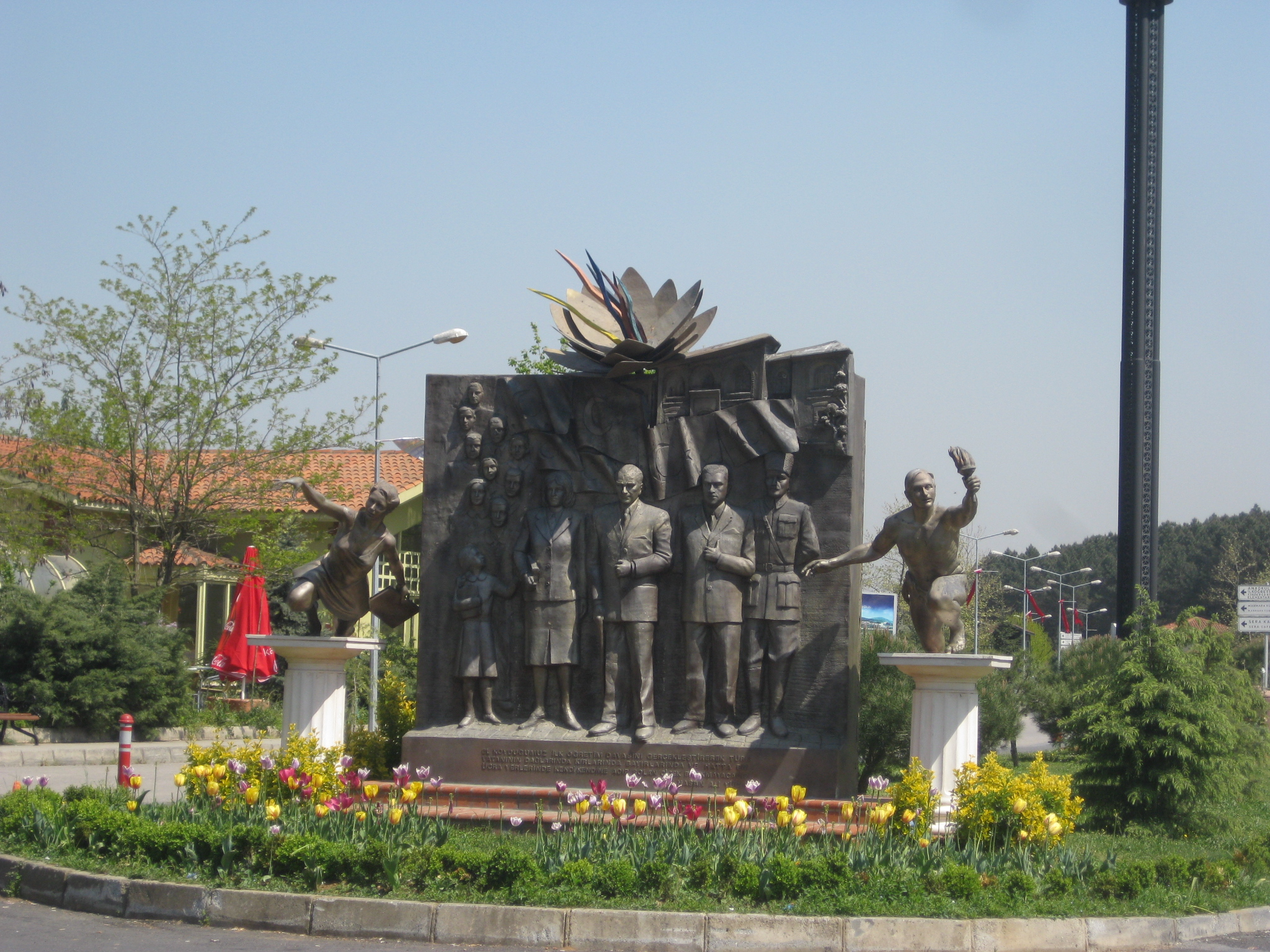
Sculpture

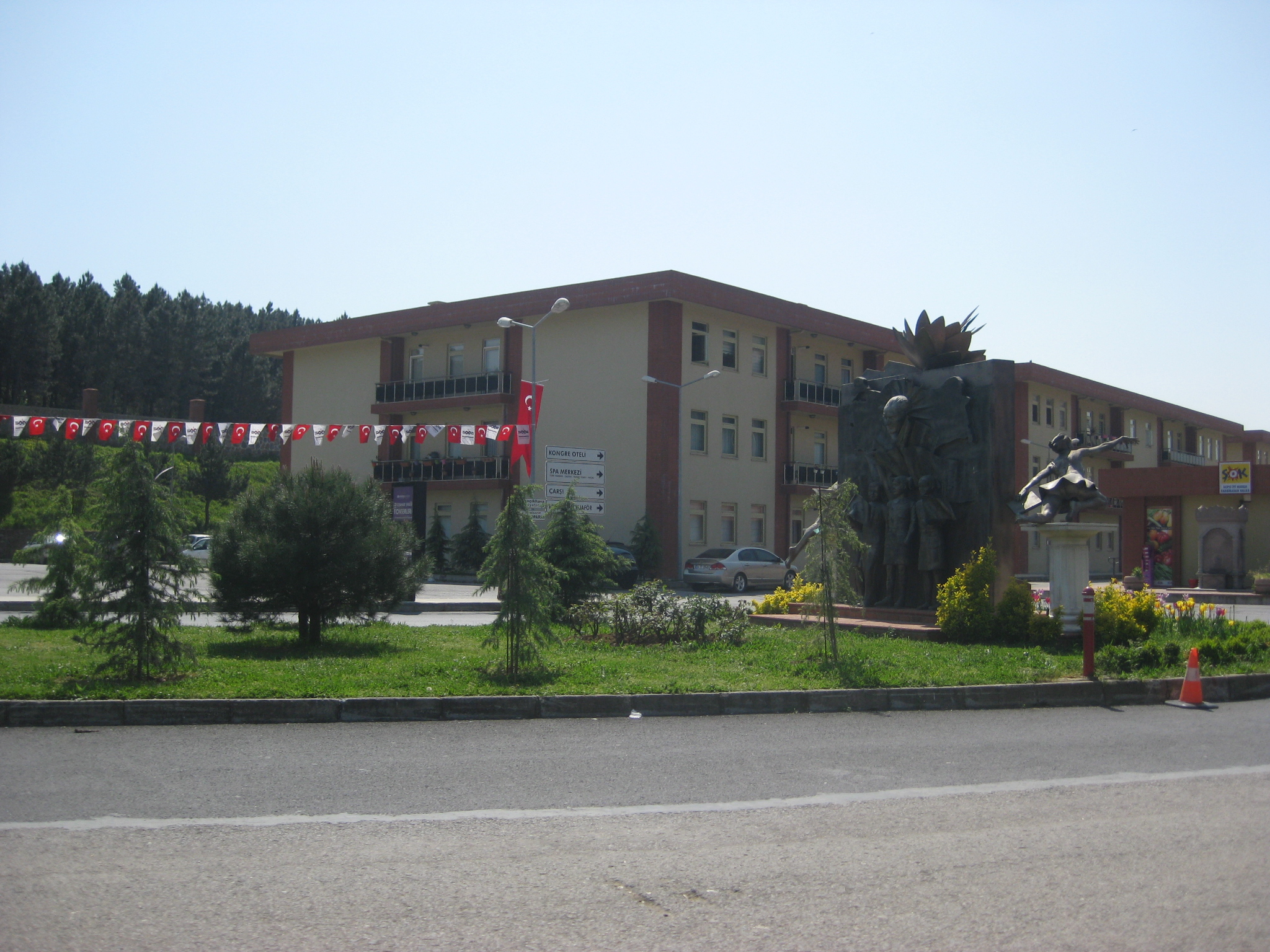
Faculty Buildings

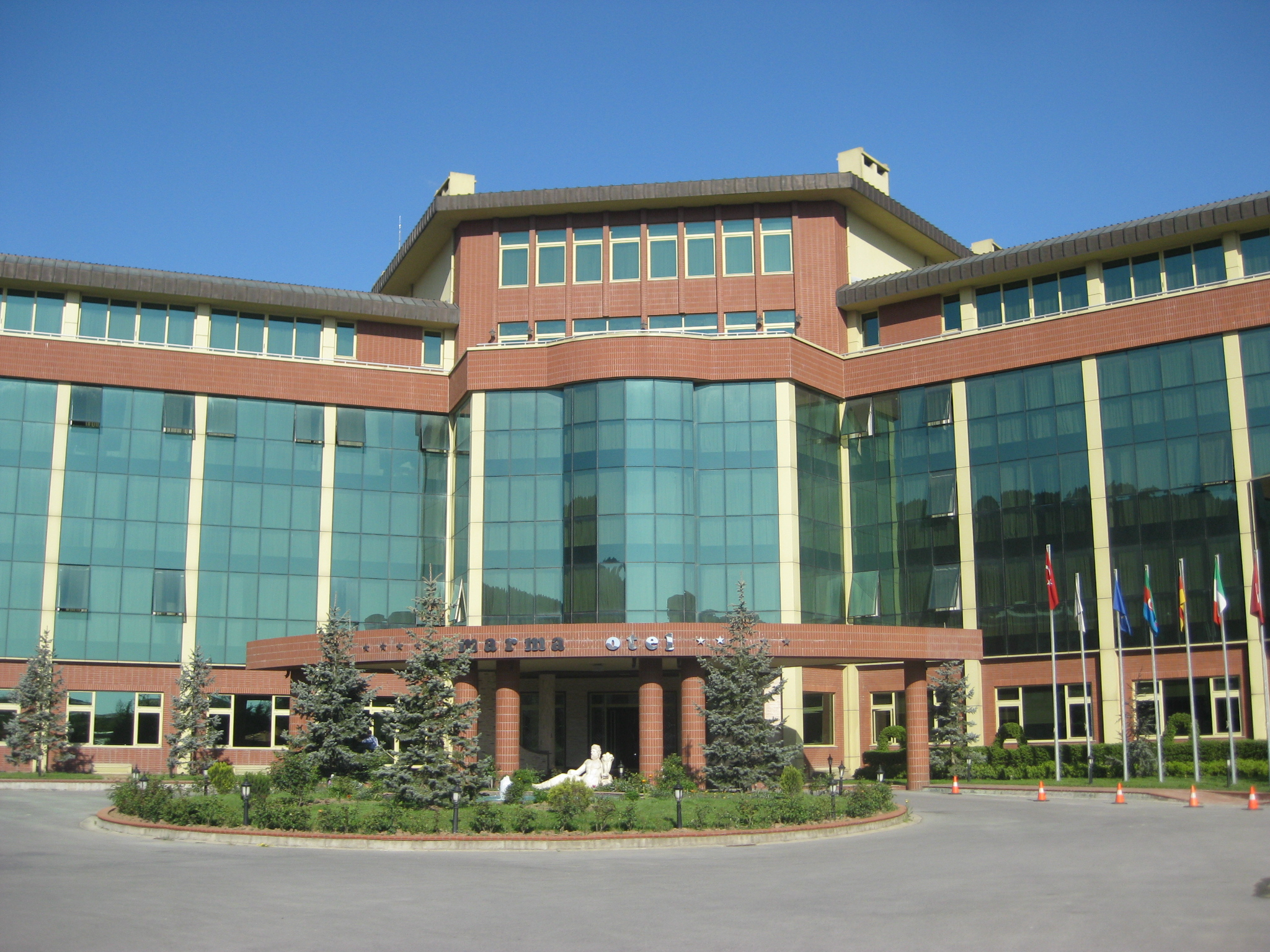
Front view of Marma Otel

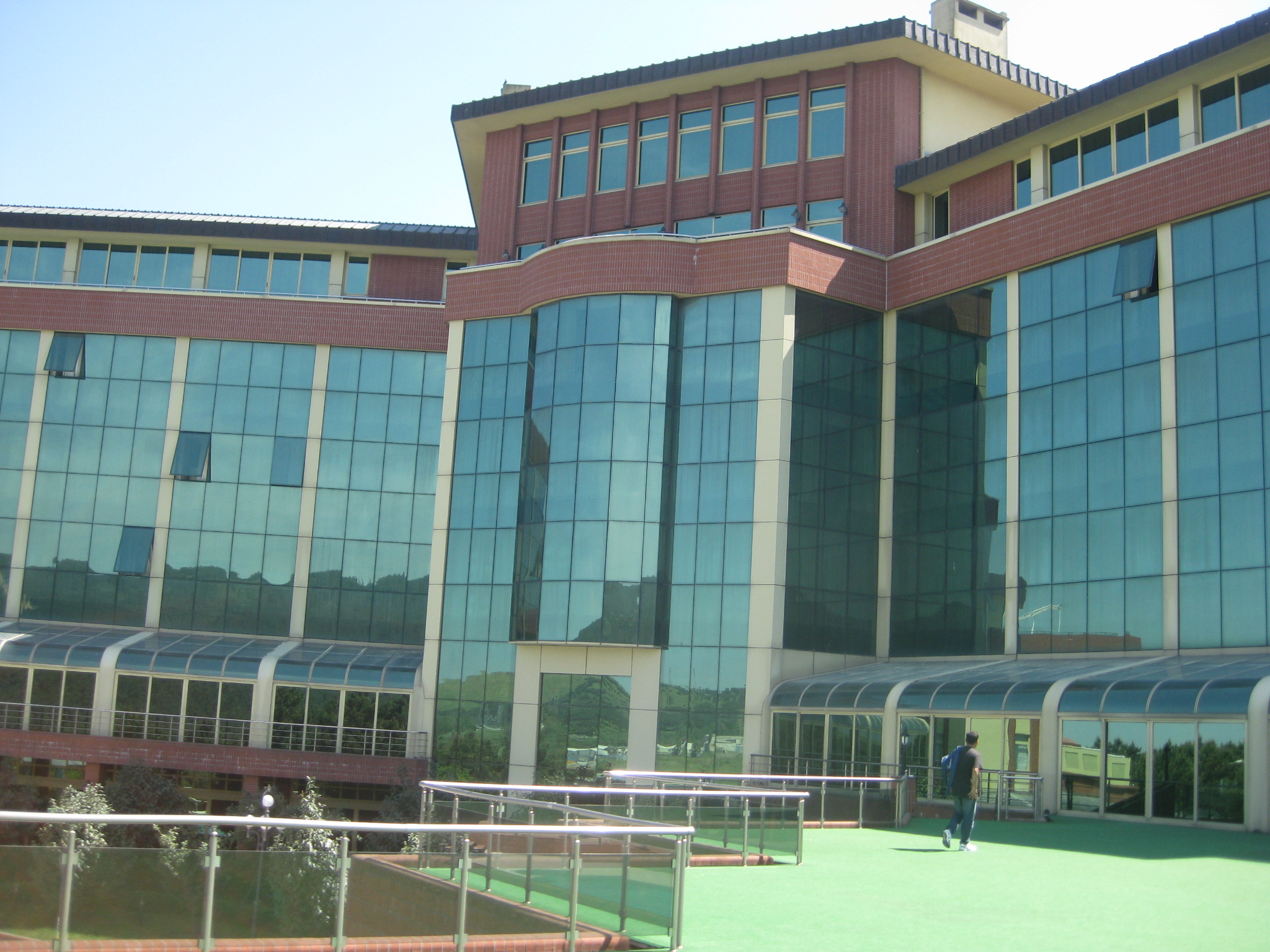
Marma Otel in Maltepe University

== See also ==
- List of universities in Turkey
