= 57th government of Turkey =

Government of the Republic of Turkey (1999-2002)

57th Government of Turkey
- Cabinet of Turkey

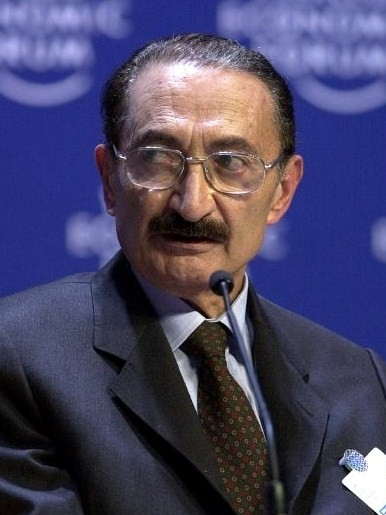
- Date formed: 28 May 1999
- Date dissolved: 18 November 2002

People and organisations
- Head of state: Suleyman Demirel Ahmet Necdet Sezer
- Head of government: Bulent Ecevit
- Member party: Democratic Left Party; Motherland Party; Nationalist Movement Party
- Status in legislature: Coalition Government

History
- Election: 1999 Turkish general election
- Predecessor: Ecevit IV
- Successor: Gül

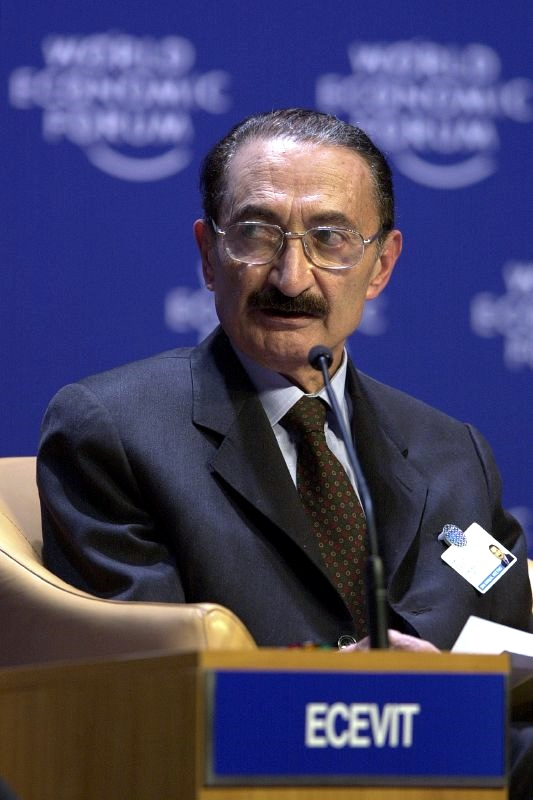
Bülent Ecevit

The 57th government of Turkey (28 May 1999 – 18 November 2002) was a coalition government led by Bülent Ecevit of Democratic Left Party (DSP).

== Background ==
The number of seats gained by the most successful party in the elections held on 18 April 1999 was only 136 out of 550. Thus, at least three parties had to form the government. Ecevit asked Motherland Party (ANAP) and Nationalist Movement Party (MHP) to participate in the government.

== The government ==
In the list below, the serving period of cabinet members who served only a part of the cabinet's lifespan are shown in the column "Notes". The main reason for the excessive number of changes in the seats was the formation of a new party. A group of MPs split off from DSP to form the New Turkey Party, and they resigned from their seats in the government. Also, according to the Turkish constitution, some members of the government were replaced by independent members before the elections.

Title	Name	Party	Notes
Prime Minister	Bülent Ecevit	DSP	
Deputy Prime Minister
Deputy Prime Minister	Devlet Bahçeli	MHP	
Deputy Prime Minister	Hüsamettin Özkan; Şükrü Sina Gürel	DSP	28 May 1999 – 9 July 2002; 9 July 2002 – 12 July 2002
Deputy Prime Minister	Mesut Yılmaz	ANAP	
Minister of State
Minister of State	Mehmet Keçeciler	ANAP	
Minister of State	Hikmet Uluğbay; Recep Önal; Tayfun İçli	DSP	28 May 1999 – 22 July 1999; 22 July 1999 - 9 July 2002; 9 July 2002 - 18 November 2002
Minister of State	Tunca Toskay	MHP	
Minister of State	Yüksel Yalova; Sadettin Tantan; Nejat Arseven; Ali Doğan	ANAP	28 May 1999 – 31 May 2001; 5 June 2001 – 6 June 2001; 8 August 2001 – 7 August 2002; 7 August 2002 - 18 November 2002
Minister of State	Şükrü Sina Gürel; Zeki Sezer	DSP	28 May 1999 – 9 July 2002; 9 July 2002 - 18 November 2002
Minister of State	Sadi Somuncuoğluz; Faruk Bal	MHP	28 May 1999 – 8 May 2000; 22 May 2000 - 18 November 2002
Minister of State	Rüştü Kazım Yücelen; Yılmaz Karakoyunlu	ANAP	28 May 1999 – 5 June 2001; 5 June 2001 - 18 November 2002
Minister of State	Mustafa Yılmaz; Mehmet Kocabatmaz	DSP	28 May 1999 – 10 July 2002; 10 July 2002 -18.11.2002
Minister of State	Ramazan Mirzaoğlu	MHP	
Minister of State	Edip Saffer Gaydalı; Salih Yıldırım	ANAP	28 May 1999 – 12 September 2002; 12 September 2002 - 18 November 2002
Minister of State	Hasan Gemici; Melda Bayer	DSP	28 May 1999 – 10 July 2002; 10 July 2002 - 18 November 2002
Minister of State	Şuayip Üşenmez	MHP	
Minister of State	Mehmet Ali İrtemçelik	ANAP	28 May 1999 - 8 May 2000
Minister of State	Fikret Ünlü; Erdoğan Toprak	DSP	28 May 1999 - 24 August 2002; 24 August 2002 - 18 November 2002
Minister of State	Mehmet Çay; Reşat Doğru	MHP	28 May 1999 - 24 December 2001; 7 January 2002 - 18 November 2002
Minister of State	Kemal Derviş; Masum Türker	Indep; DSP	2 March 2001 - 10 August 2002; 10 August 2002 - 18 November 2002
Minister of State	Tayyibe Gülek	DSP	12 July 2002 - 18 November 2002
Ministry of Justice	Hikmet Sami Türk; Aysel Çelikel	DSP; Indep	28 May 1999 – 5 August 2002; 5 August 2002 – 18 November 2002
Ministry of National Defense	Sabahattin Çakmakoğlu	MHP	
Ministry of the Interior	Sadettin Tantan; Rüştü Kazım Yücelen; Muzaffer Ecemiş	ANAP; ANAP; Indep	28 May 1999 – 5 June 2001; 8 June 2001 – 5 June 2001; 5 August 2002 – November 18, 2002
Ministry of Foreign Affairs	İsmail Cem; Şükrü Sina Gürel	DSP	28 May 1999 – 12 July 2001; 12 July 2002 – 18 November 2002
Ministry of Finance	Sümer Oral	ANAP	
Ministry of National Education	Metin Bostancıoğlu; Necdet Tekin	DSP	28 May 1999 – 10 July 2002; 10 July 2002 – 18 November 2002
Ministry of Public Works	Koray Aydın; Abdülkadir Akcan	MHP	28 May 1999 – 5 September 2001; 19 September 2001 – 18 November 2002
Ministry of Health and Social Security	Osman Durmuş	MHP	
Ministry of Agriculture and Village Affairs	Yusuf Gökalp	MHP	
Ministry of Transport	Enis Öksüz; Oktay Vural; Naci Kınacıoğlu	MHP; MHP; Indep	28 May 1999 – 17 July 2001; 30 July 2001 – 5 August 2002; 5 August 2002 – 18 November 2002
Ministry of Labour and Social Security	Yaşar Okuyan; Nejat Arseven	ANAP	28 May 1999 – 7 August 2002; 7 August 2002 – 18 November 2002
Ministry of Industry and Commerce	Kenan Tanrıkulu	MHP	
Ministry Tourism	Erkan Mumcu; Mustafa Taşar	ANAP	28 May 1999 – 8 August 2001; 8 May 2001 – 18 November 2002
Ministry Culture	İstemihan Talay; Suat Çağlayan	DSP	28 May 1999 – 9 July 2002; 9 July 2002 – 18 November 2002
Ministry of Environment	Fevzi Aytekin	DSP	
Ministry of Energy and Natural Resources	Cumhur Ersümer (Note: Between 29 June 1999 – 12 July 2000, he also assumed the title Deputy Prime Minister); Zeki Çakan	ANAP	28 May 1999 – 27 April 2001; 8 May 2001 – 18 November 2002
Ministry of Forestry	Nami Çağan	DSP	

== Aftermath ==
The government ended because of the elections held in 2002.

== Notes ==
Preceded by 56th government of Turkey (Bülent Ecevit)	57th Government of Turkey; 28 May 1999 – 18 November 2002	Succeeded by 58th government of Turkey (Abdullah Gül)
