= 2015 Democratic Left Party Extraordinary Convention =

- 13 December 2015

319 votes needed to win in the first two rounds A simple majority of votes needed to win in the final round
- Turnout: 61.79% (1st round), 58.49% (2nd), 56.13% (3rd)
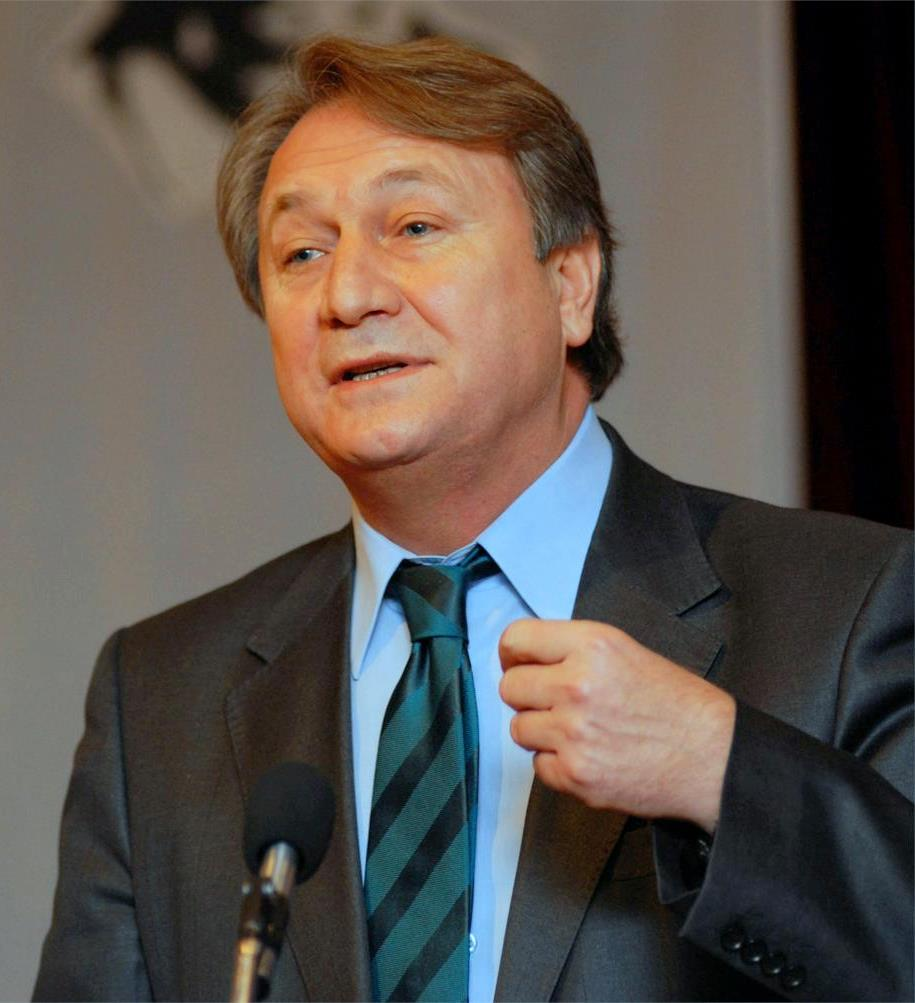
Candidate	Önder Aksakal	Emrah Konuralp	Zeki Sezer
Party	DSP	DSP	DSP
1st round	235 (60.1%)	95 (24.3%)	61 (15.6%)
2nd round	250 (67.6%)	120 (32.4%)	✗ withdrew
3rd round	247 (69.4%)	109 (30.6%)	✗ withdrew
Leader before election
Masum Türker
DSP
Elected Leader
Önder Aksakal
DSP

The 2015 Democratic Left Party Extraordinary Convention was held on 13 December 2015 in order to elect a new leader for the Democratic Left Party (DSP), a centre-left political party in Turkey. The convention was called after the resignation of former leader Masum Türker, who stepped down after the DSP won its lowest ever result in the November 2015 general election. The party polled 31,805 votes (0.07%) and fell well below the 10% election threshold needed to win seats in the Grand National Assembly. The convention was held in the conference hall of the Turkish Energy, Water and Gas Workers' Union (TES-İŞ).

Among the candidates were former party leader Zeki Sezer, though the DSP executive fielded Önder Aksakal as its preferred successor to Türker. After three rounds of voting, Aksakal was confirmed as the party's new leader.

== Background ==
The Democratic Left Party (DSP) is a centre-left social democratic political party in Turkey, founded by former Prime Minister Bülent Ecevit and his wife Rahşan Ecevit in 1985. Due to the similarities in ideology, there have been consistent calls and expectations that the DSP would form an electoral pact or merge entirely with the much larger Republican People's Party (CHP), which Bülent Ecevit himself had led between 1972 and 1980. The DSP had entered the 2007 general election in an alliance with the CHP, but did not repeat this strategy in the 2011 election.

In the June 2015 general election, party leader Masum Türker ruled out an electoral alliance but stated that he was openly willing to form a coalition with the CHP if they won representation in Parliament. The party won just 0.2% of the vote, falling below the 10% threshold needed to win seats. The party fared even worse in the November 2015 general election held just months later, winning 0.07% of the vote. Türker subsequently announced his resignation as leader and called an extraordinary convention, while the party executive fielded Önder Aksakal as their preferred successor for the leadership.

== Candidates ==
- Önder Aksakal, fielded as the 'establishment candidate' by the party's executive
- Emrah Konuralp, seen as the candidate of the inner-party opposition and former leadership candidate in 2013.
- Zeki Sezer, former leader of the DSP between 2004 and 2009
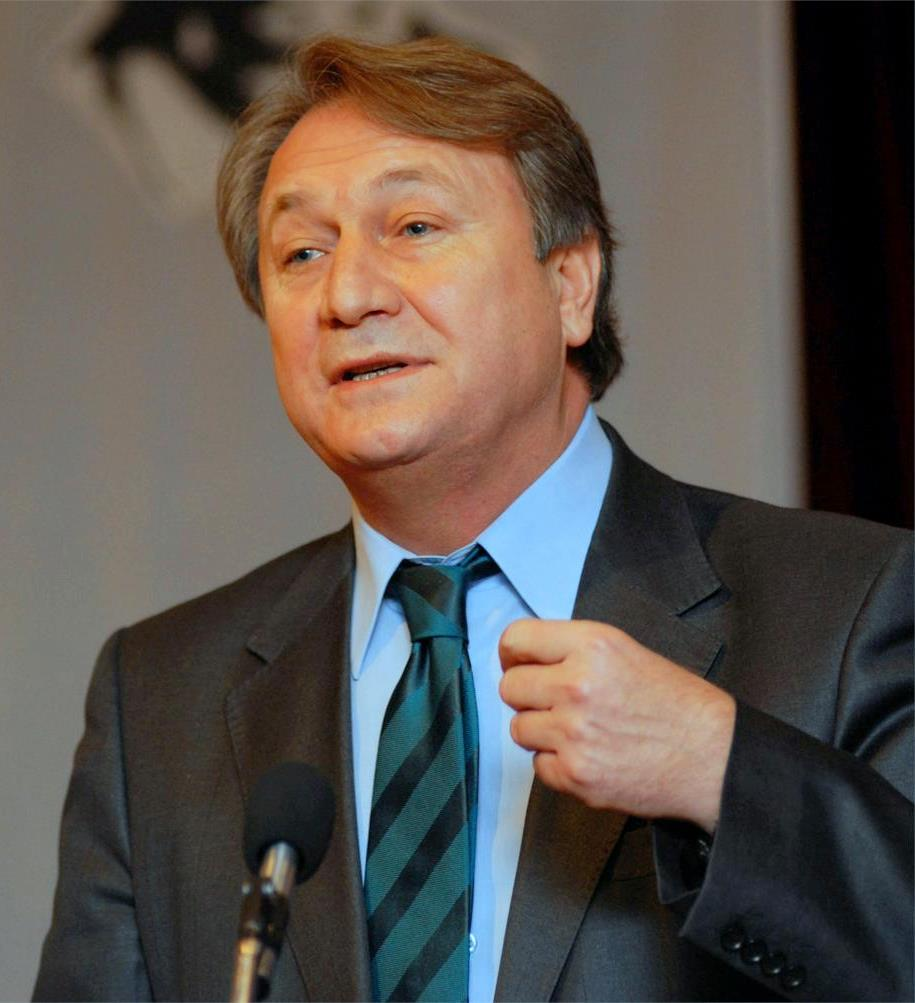
Zeki Sezer, former leader of the DSP between 2004 and 2009

=== Campaign ===
While on a tour in Kütahya, the frontrunner in the leadership race Önder Aksakal heavily criticised the Republican People's Party (CHP) and the Peoples' Democratic Party (HDP), two other parties in Turkey originating from the political left. He claimed that the HDP was a party that did politics through 'ethnic fascism', while criticising the CHP's executive for being 'half in favour of dividing the state, half in support for the Gülen Movement'.

== Election result ==
A total of 636 delegates were registered to vote. A candidate needed 50%+1 of the delegates' support (319 votes) to win in the first two rounds. In the third round, the candidate with the most votes was elected, regardless of whether their number of votes surpassed the 319 threshold. Zeki Sezer withdrew from the leadership race after coming third in the first round.

Candidate	First round		Second round		Third round	
Candidate	Votes	Percentage	Votes	Percentage	Votes	Percentage
Önder Aksakal ✓	250	60.1%	235	67.6%	247	69.4%
Emrah Konuralp	95	24.3%	120	32.4%	109	30.6%
Zeki Sezer	61	15.6%	✗ Withdrew		✗ Withdrew	
Total valid	391	100.0%	370	100.0%	356	100.0%
Invalid / blank	2	0.5%	2	0.5%	1	0.3%
Turnout	393	61.8%	372	58.5%	357	56.1%
Source: Haber Türk

=== Aftermath ===
After his election victory, Aksakal thanked his supporters and claimed that 2016 would be the year of the 'DSP and the democratic socialists'. He issued a call for more support for his party and claimed that they would collectively bring the DSP back into government. Outgoing leader Masum Türker also warned that the establishment would try and put obstacles in the way of Aksakal, calling on activists to overcome these obstacles collectively.

== See also ==
- 35th Republican People's Party Ordinary Convention, a convention of the CHP that took place a month after the DSP's convention.
