= Ekşi =

Ekşi (pronounced [ecˈʃiː]) is a Turkish surname and may refer to:

== People ==
- Arslan Ekşi (born 1985), Turkish volleyball player
- Aysel Ekşi (1934–2015), Turkish psychiatrist and professor
- Oktay Ekşi (born 1932), Turkish journalist, author and politician

== See also ==
- Eksi (disambiguation)
- Ekşi Sözlük, community website
