= İstemihan Talay =

Turkish politician (born 1945)

Mustafa İstemihan Talay

Minister of Culture
- In office 30 June 1997 – 9 July 2002
- Preceded by: İsmail Kahraman
- Succeeded by: Suat Çağlayan

Personal details
- Born: 1945 (age 80–81) Tarsus, Mersin, Turkey
- Party: Social Democratic Populist Party (SHP), Republican People's Party (CHP), Democratic Left Party (DSP), New Turkey Party (YTP)

Mustafa İstemihan Talay (born 1945) is a Turkish politician and former government minister.

== Early life ==
İstemihan Talay was born to İbrahim Rifat and Emine in Tarsus ilçe (district) of Mersin Province in 1945. He completed Tarsus American College in 1964, and studied in the Faculty of Political Sciences in Ankara University. After obtaining a master's degree in Public Administration, he began working as a civil servant. He was appointed kaymakam (district governor) of Bozcaada and Vezirköprü ilçes. Currently, he is a member of the Board of Trustees of the Istanbul Aydın University.

== Politics ==
In the general election held on 29 November 1987, he entered the 18th Parliament from the Social Democratic Populist Party (SHP) as a deputy of Mersin Province, known as İçel Province at that time. He kept his seat in the 19th Parliament of Turkey. He joined the Republican People's Party (CHP) when it was reestablished mainly by the members of the SHP on 16 September 1992. In 1995, SHP merged into CHP. In the general election held on 24 December 1995, however, he joined the Democratic Left Party (DSP) as deputy of Mersin Province. In the 55th, 56th, and the 57th government of Turkey, he served as the Minister of Culture between 30 June 1997 and 9 July 2002. When the DSP broke up, he abandoned his seat in the government and joined the New Turkey Party. (YTP). In 2004, the YTP merged into the CHP. Currently, he is a member of the CHP.
