= Hüsamettin Özkan =

Turkish politician (born 1950)

Deputy Prime Minister of Turkey
- In office 11 January 1999 – 8 July 2002
- Prime Minister: Bülent Ecevit
- Served with: Mesut Yılmaz; Devlet Bahçeli; Hikmet Uluğbay
- Preceded by: İsmet Sezgin
- Succeeded by: Şükrü Sina Gürel

Minister of State
- In office 30 June 1997 – 11 January 1999
- Prime Minister: Mesut Yılmaz

Member of the Grand National Assembly
- In office 20 October 1991 – 3 November 2002
- Constituency: Istanbul (II) (1991, 1995, 1999)

Personal details
- Born: 1950 (age 75–76) Develi, Kayseri, Turkey
- Party: Democratic Left (1991-2002); New Turkey Party (2002-04)
- Education: Pertevniyal High School
- Alma mater: Marmara University
- Occupation: Politician

Hasan Hüsamettin Özkan (born 1950) is a former Turkish politician who served as the Deputy Prime Minister of Turkey between 1999 and 2002 in the 56th and 57th governments led by Prime Minister Bülent Ecevit. He was a Member of Parliament for Istanbul's second electoral district from the Democratic Left Party (DSP) from 1991 to 2002. He was also a Minister of State during the coalition government led by Motherland Party (ANAP) leader Mesut Yılmaz between 1997 and 1999.

== Early life and career ==
Of Circassian descent, Özkan was the youngest of seven children and was born in 1950 in the district of Develi, Kayseri. He was educated at Pertevniyal High School and graduated from Galatasaray School of Economics and Management (now Marmara University. In 1968, he was a contestant in the Golden Lantern Dance Competition along with Tülin Aktan and came first. His brother, Necdet Özkan, was elected as the Mayor of Istanbul's Bayrampaşa district, after which he took over most of his family trade business.

== Political career ==
Özkan joined the DSP in 1991 and became a Member of Parliament for Istanbul's second electoral district in the 1991 general election. He was perceived to be close to the party's leader Bülent Ecevit.

=== Minister of State ===
Having been re-elected as a Member of Parliament in the 1995 general election, the DSP entered a triple coalition government along with the Motherland Party (ANAP) and Democrat Turkey Party (DTP). The DSP-DTP-ANAP coalition was formed after the coalition between the True Path Party and the Islamist Welfare Party broke down in 1997 as a result of the 1997 military memorandum. In the new coalition, ANAP leader Mesut Yılmaz became Prime Minister, while DSP leader Bülent Ecevit and DTP member İsmet Sezgin became Deputy Prime Ministers. In this new government, Özkan was made Minister of State.

=== Deputy Prime Minister ===
The ANAP-DSP-DTP coalition broke down in 1999 after the Türkbank scandal, with Ecevit forming a DSP-only minority government until the 1999 general election. Özkan was made Deputy Prime Minister in this new government, serving alongside Hikmet Uluğbay. During his time as Deputy, he dealt with issues such as the Capture of Abdullah Öcalan, the leader of the Kurdish militant Kurdistan Workers' Party.

The DSP polled the highest in the 1999 general election, with Ecevit forming a coalition with the Nationalist Movement Party (MHP) and the Motherland Party (ANAP). Özkan remained as Deputy Prime Minister, joined by the MHP's Devlet Bahçeli and ANAP's Mesut Yılmaz. During this government, he played a role in ensuring that the 2000 presidential election process did not result in parliamentary deadlock.

=== New Turkey Party ===
Concerns over Prime Minister Bülent Ecevit's health resulted in rumours that DSP politicians were plotting to oust him as leader. This led to Özkan, who was rumoured to be one of the dissident DSP parliamentarians, resigning from the DSP and becoming a co-founder of the New Turkey Party (YTP) along with Zeki Eker and İsmail Cem. Many DSP MPs also joined the party, with the YTP heading for a strong showing in the 2002 general election. However, organisational difficulties and the decision of party member Kemal Derviş to defect to the Republican People's Party (CHP) led to the YTP winning just 1.13% of the vote and falling far below the 10% election threshold needed to win representation in Parliament. As a result, Özkan resigned from the party and retired from active politics.

== See also ==
- List of deputy prime ministers of Turkey
