= Aysel Çelikel =

Turkish politician (born 1933)

Prof. Dr. Aysel Çelikel
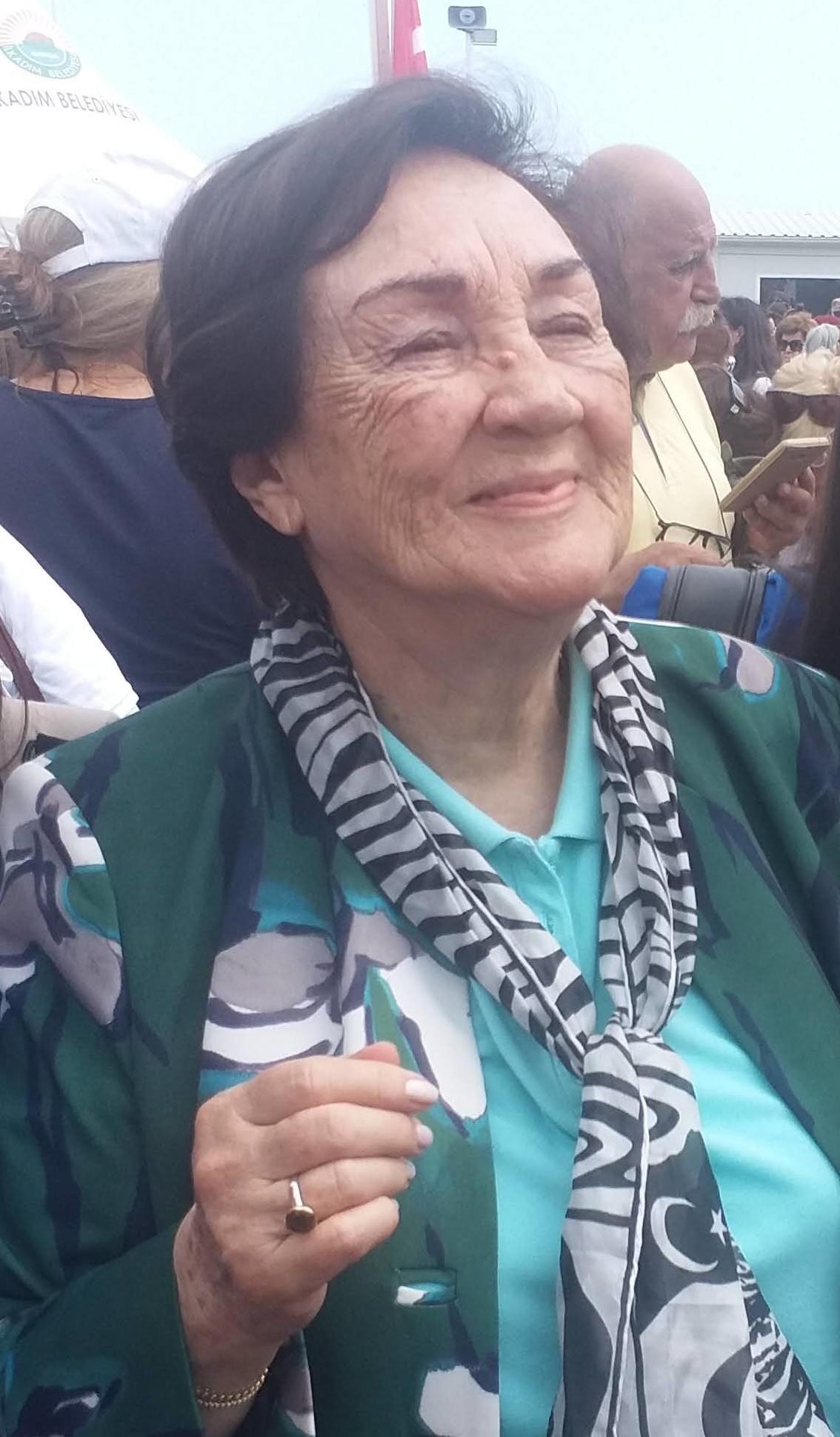

Minister of Justice
- In office 5 August 2002 – 18 November 2002
- Prime Minister: Bülent Ecevit
- Preceded by: Hikmet Sami Türk
- Succeeded by: Cemil Çiçek

Chair of the Association for the Support of Contemporary Living
- Incumbent
- Assumed office 26 May 2009
- Preceded by: Türkân Saylan

Personal details
- Born: 1933 (age 92–93) Istanbul, Turkey
- Party: Independent
- Education: Law
- Alma mater: Istanbul University (BA, PhD); Columbia University (LLM)
- Occupation: Academic, legal scholar, and author
- Profession: Private international law
- Cabinet: 57th

Aysel Çelikel (born 1933) is a Turkish academic, legal scholar and author who served as the first Minister of Justice of Turkey at 57th Cabinet. She was neither a Member of Parliament nor in political affiliation. She was appointed as an independent minister by Prime Minister Bülent Ecevit in accordance with Article 114 of the Constitution three months before the 1999 general election.

Aysel Çelikel is currently the Chairwoman of the Association for the Support of Contemporary Living (Turkish: Çağdaş Yaşamı Destekleme Derneği, ÇYDD).

Political offices
Preceded by Hikmet Sami Türk	68th Minister of Justice; 5 August 2002 – 18 November 2002	Succeeded by Cemil Çiçek
