= Zeki Eker =

Turkish politician (born 1956)

- Zeki Eker in 2026
- Born: 1956 (age 69–70); Muş, Turkey

Zeki Eker (born 1956 in Muş) is a Turkish politician of Kurdish origin. He was the MP for Muş in the 21st Parliament of Turkey, representing the Democratic Left Party. During his time as an MP, he served as the administrative chief of the parliamentary council. He is the leader of the Badıkan Tribe, one of the oldest tribes in Turkey. The roots of his tribe can be traced to Badh ibn Dustak, the founder of the Marwanids. Muşspor football club (1990–1991) reached the championship only once in its history, which was during the presidency of Zeki Eker.

Eker provided great services to the people of Muş. He granted scholarships to thousands of students and built many schools for the children living in the districts and villages of Muş. Eker resigned from Prime Minister Bülent Ecevit's party, the Democratic Left Party, in 2002. Eker took part in the establishment of YTP together with Hüsamettin Özkan and Kemal Derviş under the chairmanship of İsmail Cem in 2002, but did not become a candidate in the election. He decided to join the CHP. He rejected Deniz Baykal's offer of candidacy as a Member of Parliament in the 2007 Turkish general elections. Eker was nominated to the Party Assembly by the CHP Chairman Kemal Kılıçdaroğlu at the 18th Extraordinary Congress of the Republican People's Party. The assembly has been instrumental in the reconciliation of many hostile families, especially since it is very influential in the east and southeast regions of Turkey. Zeki is married and has seven children.
