= Melda Bayer =

Turkish politician (born 1950)

Minister of State
- In office 10 July 2002 – 18 November 2002
- Prime Minister: Bülent Ecevit

Personal details
- Born: 1950 (age 75–76) Sivas, Turkey
- Party: Democratic Left party (DSP)
- Children: 2
- Education: Ankara Academy of Commerce
- Occupation: Manager, politician

Melda Bayer (born in 1950) is a former politician and a company manager in Turkey.

Melda Bayer was born to İffet and İzzet in Sivas, Turkey in 1950. She graduated from the Academy of Commerce in Ankara. She served in OYAK, a pension fund of Turkish Armed Forces. She is married and mother of two.

She joined the Democratic Left Party (DSP), and was elected the party's speaker of the Ankara branch. In 1999, she was elected deputy from Ankara Province in the 21st Parliament of Turkey. In the 57th government of Turkey, she briefly served as the Minister of State responsible in Family Affairs between 10 July and 18 November 2002. In the 2002 general election held on 3 November, her party failed to receive enough votes to enter the parliament. Nevertheless, she continued to remain in the administrative body of the party. She resigned from her party post on 29 May 2009.
