= Association for the Support of Contemporary Life =

Civil society organization

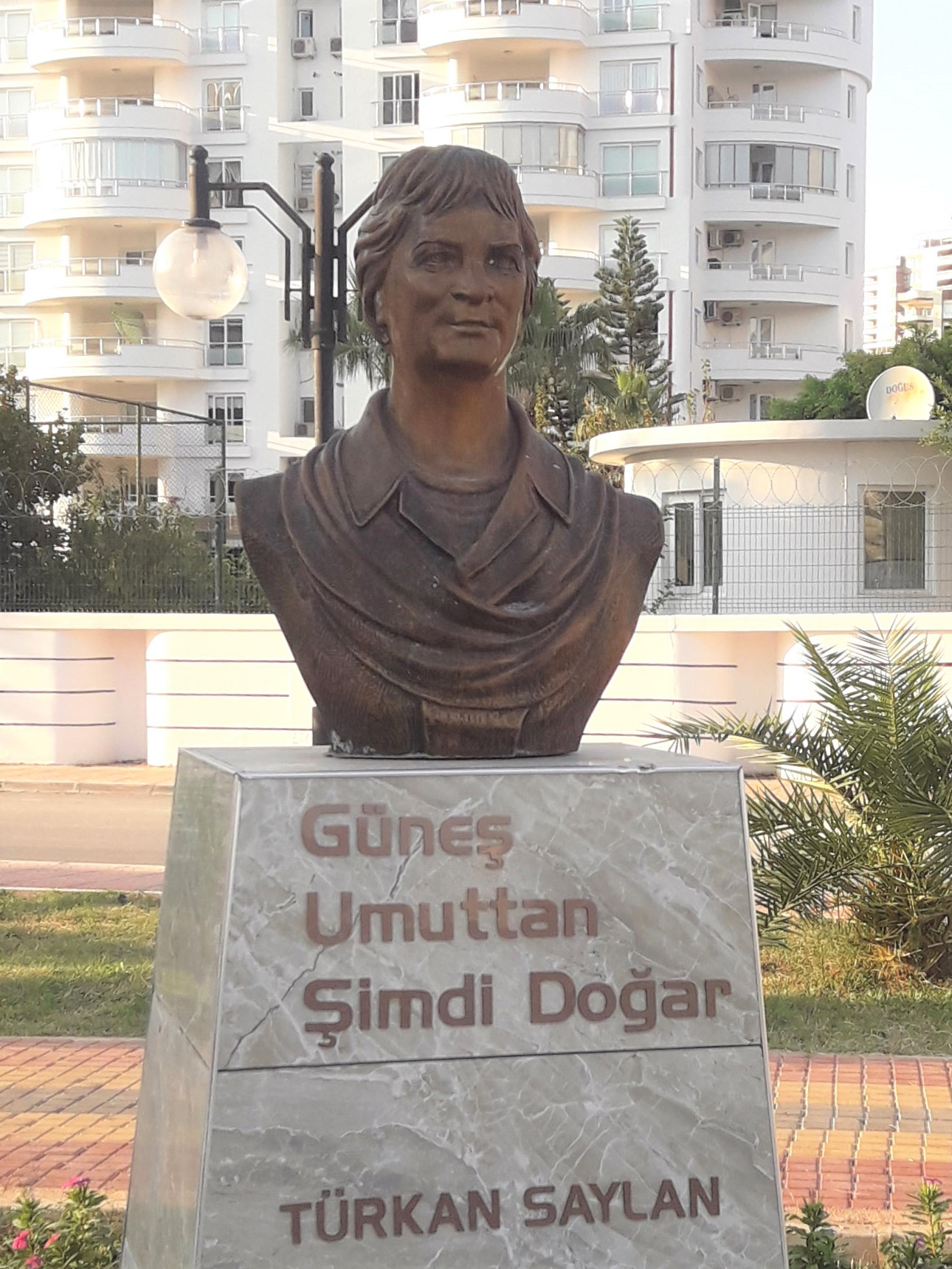
Bust of Türkan Saylan in Mersin

Association for the Support of Contemporary Life (Turkish: Çağdaş Yaşamı Destekleme Derneği) is a non-profit NGO in Turkey. The main office is in Istanbul and there are 103 branch offices nationwide. The association helps girls across Turkey to obtain an education, ultimately promoting gender equality.

== History ==
Association for the Support of Contemporary Life (abbreviated ÇYDD) was founded on 10 February 1989 by a group of Turkish female academicians headed by Aysel Ekşi in Istanbul. Next year Türkan Saylan was elected as the chairperson of the ÇYDD; from then on she became the symbol of ÇYDD. In the same year branch offices of ÇYDD began to be opened in other cities. In 1995, a subsidiary foundation of ÇYDD was founded. On 18 May 2009, Türkan Saylan died and in the next week, Aysel Çelikel a former government minister became the next chairperson. (Aysel Çelikel was the Minister of Justice of Turkey at 57th Cabinet.)

== Purpose ==
ÇYDD supports the modernization reforms of Kemal Atatürk. The official statement of ÇYDD is:

The Association for Supporting Contemporary Life is a non-governmental organization, working voluntarily with its competencies and experience, aiming to protect Atatürk’s principles and revolutions, to reach contemporary society via contemporary education for contemporary people and to carry Turkey above the contemporary civilization level.

ÇYDD is especially active in fighting against the gender discrimination and illiteracy of women. Its motto is "Future assurance of Modern Turkey".

== Achievements ==
- ÇYDD have awarded scholarships to 117,147 students. (54,657 girls in primary and secondary level and 63,497 students in university level)
- ÇYYD has commissioned 130 schools or dormitory buildings
- ÇYDD have donated 319,000 books to various schools and established 20 libraries
- Following 1999 İzmit earthquake, ÇYDD established and opened 17 rehabilitation and community centers especially for the women and the children.
- ÇYDD established Human Rights Training at Coffee Houses. (This project is supported by European Union.)
