= Cemil İpekçi =

Turkish fashion designer (born 1948)

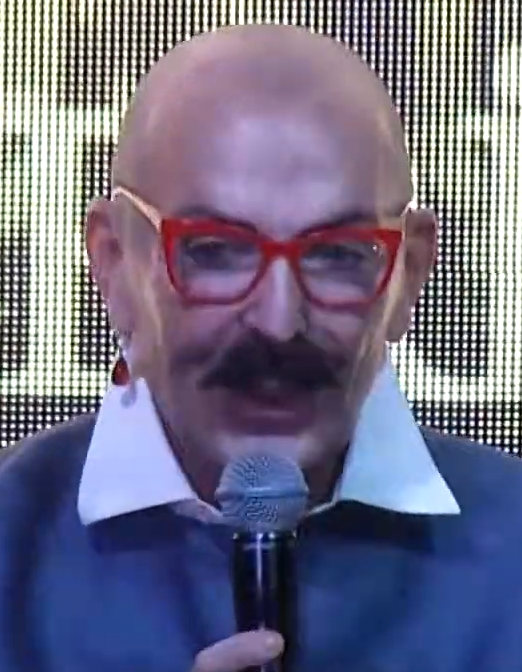
- Born: Remzi Cemil İpekçi; 5 August 1948 (age 77); Istanbul, Turkey
- Education: Royal Academy of Arts
- Occupation: Fashion designer
- Years active: 1972–present
- Relatives: Abdi İpekçi (cousin); İsmail Cem (cousin)

Remzi Cemil İpekçi (born 5 August 1948) is a Turkish fashion designer.

== Life ==
İpekçi was born on 5 August 1948 in Istanbul, Turkey. His paternal family are from Thessaloniki. Greece. Through his father, he's a distant relative of Sabbatai Zevi, and a cousin of İsmail Cem and Abdi İpekçi. From his mother's side, he is a relative of operatic soprano Leyla Gencer. Cemil İpekçi, who comes from İpekçi family, has been living in Istanbul since the age of 5 years. In an interview with Fatih Altaylı, he described himself as a conservative and gay.

== Career ==
He finished his education in England's Royal Academy of Arts and graduated in 1971. Between 1972-75, he worked as a stylist. In 1975, he founded the fashion house Tzagane. In 1979, a new branch of Tzagane was opened in Nice. Until 1984, he worked on promoting Turkish and Anatolian culture in both of his fashion houses. In 1984 he set up the Haute Couture fashion house in Istanbul and returned to contemporary night fashion. Until the 1990s, Turkish and Anatolian motifs took a break in his work, but this break ended in 1992, with his new collection "Suzeni".

On 3 January 2008, he announced that he would not organise a fashion show at the universities until the headscarf ban is lifted.
