= Eksi =

Eksi or EKSI may refer to:

- Enna kodumai Saravanan idhu?, abbreviated EKSI, a Tamil chat language term denoting irony or surprise
- Ekşi, a Turkish surname, including a list of people with the name
