= Önder Aksakal =

Turkish politician and civil engineer

Mehmet Önder Aksakal
- Önder Aksakal

Member of the Grand National Assembly
- Incumbent
- Assumed office 2 June 2023
- Constituency: Istanbul (II) (2023–present)

6th General President of the Democratic Left Party
- Incumbent
- Assumed office 13 December 2015
- Preceded by: Masum Türker

Personal details
- Born: 1960 (age 65–66) Antalya, Turkey
- Party: Democratic Left Party (DSP) (1999–present)
- Children: 2
- Education: Selçuk University
- Profession: Civil engineer, politician

Önder Aksakal (born 1960), also Mehmet Önder Aksakal, is a Turkish politician, civil engineer, and the current Chairman of the Democratic Left Party (Demokratik Sol Parti, DSP). He has served as a member of the Grand National Assembly of Turkey for Istanbul since the 2023 general election, to which he was elected from the Justice and Development Party (AKP) list as part of an alliance.

== Early life and education ==
Önder Aksakal was born in 1960 in Antalya, Turkey. He completed his primary education in the Aydın Province, attending Geyre Primary School in Karacasu district for his first four years and finishing fifth grade at Gazipaşa Primary School in Aydın. He completed middle school at İsmet İnönü Ortaokulu and graduated from the Electrical Department of Aydın Endüstri Meslek Lisesi.

He began his higher education in the 1976–1977 academic year at the Konya Devlet Mühendislik Mimarlık Akademisi in the Civil Engineering department and graduated from Selçuk University.

== Career ==
Before his entry into politics, Aksakal worked as a civil engineer. He worked as a freelance engineer in Aydın and was active in the construction-contracting, tourism, transportation, and LPG sectors. Following the 1980 Turkish military coup, he was arrested, tried, and imprisoned for five years, and given a 15-year ban on political activities. After the ban ended, he joined the Democratic Left Party (DSP) in 1999. From 2003 to 2004, he served as the DSP Aydın Provincial Chairman. In July 2004, he was elected to the DSP Party Council (Parti Meclisi) at the party's 6th Grand Congress. Following Masum Türker's election as party leader in May 2009, Aksakal was appointed a Deputy General President, with responsibilities for civil society organizations and professional chambers. He was reappointed as a Deputy General President in June 2010 and simultaneously made head of the party's Organization Board.

On 13 December 2015, Aksakal was elected as the 6th General President of the DSP at their congress, succeeding Masum Türker. He has been re-elected as leader at subsequent ordinary congresses in 2016, 2019, and 2023. Aksakal has been a DSP candidate for the parliament in multiple general elections. He ran for parliament from Aydın in the 1999, 2002, and 2011 elections, and from Istanbul in the 2015 election, before his successful run in 2023.

Aksakal led the DSP into an alliance with the ruling Justice and Development Party, part of the People's Alliance. The DSP supported President Recep Tayyip Erdoğan's re-election and, instead of running with its own party, placed candidates on the AKP's electoral lists. This decision was controversial, leading to criticism from some provincial party organizations and the resignation of at least one deputy chair. Aksakal defended the move as being based on national solidarity and the protection of constitutional principles. Through this alliance, Aksakal was placed fourth on the AKP's candidate list for Istanbul's 2nd electoral district and was elected to the 28th Parliament of Turkey.
