= Kemal Derviş =

Turkish economist and politician (1949–2023)

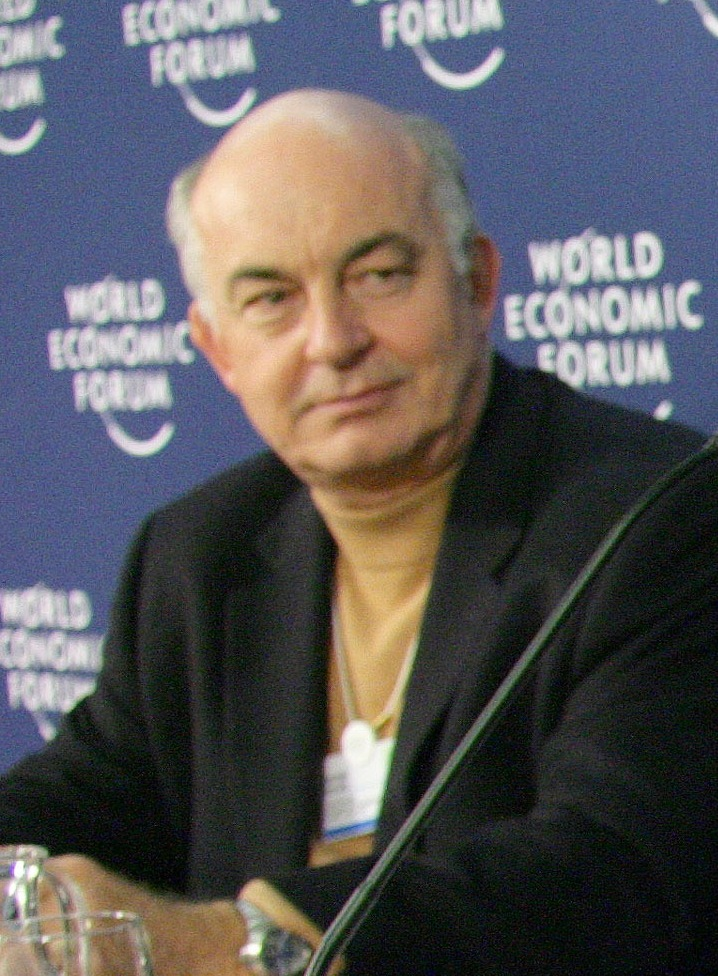
- Derviş in 2006

Administrator of the United Nations Development Programme
- In office 15 August 2005 – 28 February 2009
- Secretary-General: Ban Ki-moon
- Preceded by: Mark Malloch Brown
- Succeeded by: Helen Clark

Minister of Economic Affairs
- In office 13 March 2001 – 10 August 2002
- Prime Minister: Bülent Ecevit
- Preceded by: Recep Önal
- Succeeded by: Masum Türker

Personal details
- Born: 10 January 1949 Istanbul, Turkey
- Died: 8 May 2023 (aged 74) Washington, D.C., U.S.
- Party: Republican People's Party
- Spouse(s): Neslihan Boralı (m. 1982; div. 1984) Catherine Derviş (m. 1987)
- Children: 2
- Education: Institut Le Rosey
- Alma mater: London School of Economics (BSc, MSc); Princeton University (PhD)

Kemal Derviş (Turkish pronunciation: [keˈmal dɛɾviʃ]; 10 January 1949 – 8 May 2023) was a Turkish economist and politician who was head of the United Nations Development Programme. He was honored by the government of Japan for having "contributed to mainstreaming Japan's development assistance policy through the United Nations". In 2005, he was ranked 67th in the Top 100 Public Intellectuals Poll conducted by Prospect and Foreign Policy magazines. He was vice president and director of the global economy and development program at the Brookings Institution and part-time professor of international economics at the Graduate Institute of International and Development Studies in Geneva.

In March 2015, Derviş agreed to become the Deputy Prime Minister of Turkey responsible for the economy in a cabinet led by Republican People's Party (CHP) leader Kemal Kılıçdaroğlu should his party form the government after the general election to be held in June. He declined to become a Member of Parliament however, stating that he would prefer to participate in the cabinet from outside the Parliament.

== Early life and career ==
Kemal Derviş was born on 10 January 1949 in Istanbul, Turkey, to an Albanian and Georgian father and a German mother. From his father's side, he is a descendant of Ottoman Grand Vizier Halil Hamid Pasha (1736–1785); and of Ottoman military physician Asaf Derviş Pasha (1868–1928) who is regarded as the founder of modern gynaecology in Turkey.

Derviş completed his early education in Institut Le Rosey. He later earned his bachelor (1968) and master's degrees (1970) in economics from the London School of Economics. He received his Ph.D. in economics from Princeton University in 1973 after completing a doctoral dissertation titled "Substitution, employment and intertemporal equilibrium in a non-linear multi-sector planning model for Turkey." From 1973 to 1976, he was member of the economics faculty of the Middle East Technical University in Ankara, Turkey, and served also as an advisor to Bülent Ecevit during and after his Prime Ministerial duties. From 1976 to 1978, he was a member of the faculty, Department of Economics at Princeton University.

In 1977, he joined the World Bank, where he worked until he returned to Turkey in 2001. At the World Bank, he held various positions, including division chief for industrial and trade strategy and director for the Central Europe Department after the fall of the Berlin Wall. In 1996, he became vice-president of the World Bank for the Middle East and North Africa Region, and in 2000, vice-president for poverty reduction and economic management.

== Political career ==
Derviş took office as Minister of State for Economic Affairs in Turkey on 13 March 2001, when Bülent Ecevit was Prime Minister. Derviş is credited with being the architect of Turkey's successful three-year economic recovery program launched in that year. The health condition of elder statesman Bülent Ecevit, the Prime Minister and leader of the party led to rumours that his Deputy Prime minister and Minister of State, Hüsamettin Özkan, was plotting to replace him. As a result, Özkan was forced to resign, prompting nearly half of DSP's parliamentarians to follow him, including İsmail Cem, the Minister of Foreign Affairs. Özkan, Zeki Eker, Cem and Kemal Derviş, the Minister of State in charge of economy, then decided to establish a new social democratic party. İsmail Cem became the leader of the New Turkey Party (YTP).

However, the party showed signs of organizational weakness. Moreover, Derviş changed his mind and joined the Republican People's Party (CHP) instead. As a result, the YTP performed dismally in the 2002 general election (receiving only 1.2% of the eligible votes cast) and again in the 2004 local elections. In October 2004, the YTP was merged into the Republican People's Party (CHP). Before being named to head the United Nations Development Programme (UNDP), he was a member of the Turkish parliament, and a member of the joint commission of the Turkish and European Parliaments. He was a member of the Convention on the Future of Europe. A member of the Advisory Group at the Center for Global Development, member of the Task Force on Global Public Goods and the Special Commission on the Balkans and associated with the Economics and Foreign Policy Forum in Istanbul, Derviş was instrumental in strengthening Turkey's prospects of starting membership negotiations with the European Union.

Strobe Talbott announced that Derviş joined the Brookings Institution on 30 March 2009 as vice president and director of the Global Economy and Development program.

On 10 June 2020, he published a Project Syndicate article titled "Less Globalization, More Multilateralism." Derviş was also a regular contributor to Project Syndicate from 2003 to 2023.

== Ministry of Economic Affairs ==
When Derviş became Turkey's minister of economic affairs in March 2001, after a 22-year career at the World Bank, the country was facing its worst economic crisis in modern history and prospects for success were uncertain. Derviş used his independence from domestic interests and the support of domestic reformers and civil society to push through a stabilization program with far-reaching structural changes and bank reforms that protected state banks from political use. Derviş also strengthened the independence of the central bank and initiated deep structural reforms in agriculture, energy and the budget process. These reforms, and his reputation and high-level contacts in the U.S. and Europe, is said to have helped him to mobilize $20 billion in new loans from the International Monetary Fund and the World Bank. Rapid economic growth resumed in 2002 and inflation came down from an average of nearly 70 percent in the 1990s to 12 percent in 2003; interest rates fell and the exchange rate for the Turkish lira stabilized.

Derviş resigned from his ministerial position on 10 August 2002 and was elected to parliament on 3 November of that year as a member of the main opposition Republican People's Party.

== United Nations Development Program ==
On 5 May 2005, the United Nations General Assembly, representing 191 countries, unanimously confirmed Kemal Derviş as the Administrator of the United Nations Development Program, which is also the chairperson of the United Nations Development Group. Derviş started his four-year term on 15 August 2005. The UNDP Administrator is the third-highest-ranking official in the United Nations, after the Secretary-General and the Deputy Secretary-General.

In 2006, United Nations Secretary-General Kofi Annan appointed Derviş to a High-level Panel on United Nations Systemwide Coherence, which was set up to explore how the United Nations system could work more coherently and effectively across the world in the areas of development, humanitarian assistance and the environment.

In 2009, Derviş decided not to seek a second term as Administrator of UNDP.

== Personal life and death ==
Kemal Derviş spoke Turkish, German, English and French fluently. He was married to Catherine Derviş, an American citizen.

According to press reports, when he was still single and working at the World Bank, Derviş had an affair with a married female subordinate (her identity was not revealed) who reportedly later started working at the IMF. This was speculated by the media as the possible reason why Derviş, despite being seen by many as the right person for the job, decided not to become a candidate to succeed Dominique Strauss-Kahn as the next managing director of the IMF, a position which was eventually taken by Christine Lagarde.

Kemal Derviş died in Washington, D.C., on 8 May 2023, at the age of 74.

== Honors ==
- Order of the Rising Sun, Grand Cordon (Japan), 2009.
- Order of Civil Merit, Grand Cross (Spain), 2011.

== Selected works ==
- Dadush, Uri B. (2012). Inequality in America: Facts, Trends and International Perspectives. Brookings Institution Press. ISBN 978-0-8157-2421-6.
- Dervis, Kemal; Özer, Ceren (2008). A Better Globalization: Legitimacy, Governance and Reform.
- Recovery from the Crisis and Contemporary Social Democracy. 2006.
- Dervis, Kemal; Page, John M. (1984). "Industrial Policy in Developing Countries". Journal of Comparative Economics. 8 (4). (with John M. Page, Jr.): 436–451. doi:10.1016/0147-5967(84)90040-4.
- General Equilibrium Models for Development Policy. Cambridge University Press, Cambridge. 1982.

Political offices
Preceded by Recep Önal	Minister of Economic Affairs; 2001–2002	Succeeded by Masum Türker
Positions in intergovernmental organisations
Preceded by Mark Malloch Brown	Administrator of the United Nations Development Programme; 2005–2009	Succeeded by Helen Clark
