= 56th government of Turkey =

Government of the Republic of Turkey (1999)

56th Government of Turkey
- Cabinet of Turkey

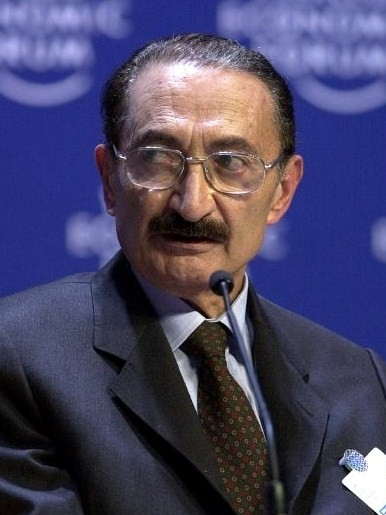
- Date formed: 11 January 1999
- Date dissolved: 28 May 1999

People and organisations
- Head of state: Suleyman Demirel
- Head of government: Bulent Ecevit
- Member party: Democratic Left Party (Turkey)
- Status in legislature: Minority government

History
- Election: 1995 Turkish general election
- Predecessor: Yılmaz III
- Successor: Ecevit V

The 56th government of Turkey (11 January 1999 – 28 May 1999) was a minority government led by Bülent Ecevit of Democratic Left Party (DSP).

== Background ==
The election results of 1995 necessitated a series of coalition governments, all of which were unstable. Finally, Bülent Ecevit, the leader of DSP, was asked to form a minority government to serve as a caretaker government until new elections. Although DSP was the fourth party measured by seats, the others promised to support his government without formally participating in it.

== The government ==
Title	Name	Party	Note
Prime Minister	Bülent Ecevit	DSP	
Deputy Prime Minister
Deputy Prime Minister	Hikmet Uluğbay	DSP	
Deputy Prime Minister	Hüsamettin Özkan	DSP	
Minister of State
Minister of State	Şükrü Sina Gürel	DSP	
Minister of State	Hasan Gemici	DSP	
Minister of State	Mustafa Yılmaz	DSP	
Minister of State	Fikret Ünlü	DSP	
Minister of State	Aydın Tümen	DSP	
Ministry of Justice	Selçuk Özbek	Indep	
Ministry of National Defense	Cahit Bayar	Indep	
Ministry of the Interior	Hikmet Sami Türk	DSP	
Ministry of Foreign Affairs	İsmail Cem	DSP	
Ministry of Finance	Zekeriya Temizel; Nami Çağan	DSP	11 January 1999 – 24 February 1999; 24 February 1999 – 28 May 1999
Ministry of National Education	Metin Bostancıoğlu	DSP	
Ministry of Public Works	Ali Ilıksoy	DSP	
Ministry of Health and Social Security	Mustafa Güven Karahan	DSP	
Ministry of Agriculture and Village Affairs	Mahmut Erdir	DSP	
Ministry of Transport	Hasan Basri Aktan	Indep	
Ministry of Labour	Nami Çağan; Hakan Tartan	DSP	11 January 1999 – 24 February 1999; 24 February 1999 – 28 May 1999
Ministry of Industry and Commerce	Metin Şahin	DSP	
Ministry Tourism	Ahmet Tan	DSP	
Ministry Culture	İstemihan Talay	DSP	
Ministry of Environment	Fevzi Aytekin	DSP	
Ministry of Energy and Natural Resources	Ziya Aktaş	DSP	
Ministry of Forestry	Arif Sezer	DSP	

== Aftermath ==
The government ended because of the elections held on 18 April 1999.

Preceded by 55th government of Turkey (Mesut Yılmaz)	56th Government of Turkey; 11 January 1999 – 28 May 1999	Succeeded by 57th government of Turkey (Bülent Ecevit)
