= New Turkey Party (2002) =

New Turkey Party Yeni Türkiye Partisi
- Abbreviation: NTP
- Leader: İsmail Cem
- General Secretary: İstemihan Talay
- Founded: 22 July 2002
- Dissolved: 24 October 2004
- Split from: Democratic Left Party
- Merged into: Republican People's Party; Social Democratic People's Party
- Ideology: Social democracy
- Political position: Centre-left

New Turkey Party or abbreviated as NTP, (Turkish: Yeni Türkiye Partisi, YTP) was a social democratic political party in Turkey. It was founded in 2002 following a leadership crisis in the Democratic Left Party (Turkish: Demokratik Sol Parti, DSP) that was the major partner in a three party coalition government.

== History ==
The health condition of elder statesman Bülent Ecevit, the Prime Minister and leader of the party led to rumours that his Deputy Prime minister and Minister of State, Hüsamettin Özkan, was plotting to replace him. As a result, Özkan was forced to resign, nearly half of DSP's parliamentarians followed him including İsmail Cem, the Minister of Foreign affairs. Özkan, Zeki Eker, Cem and Kemal Derviş, the Minister of State in charge of economy, then decided to establish a new social democratic party. İsmail Cem became the leader of the party.

The new party was received warmly by the public opinion. Most of the electorate was critical of the government because of the economic crises in 2000 and 2001, as well as the poor health of Ecevit.

However, things started to look bad for NTP as the party showed signs of organizational weakness. Moreover, Derviş changed his mind and joined the Republican People's Party (CHP) instead. As a result, the YTP performed dismally in the 2002 general election (receiving only 1.2% of the eligible votes cast) and again in the 2004 local elections.

In October 2004, the YTP was merged into the Republican People's Party (CHP).
