= Aysel Ekşi =

Turkish psychiatrist (1934–2015)

- Born: 26 January 1934
- Died: 14 May 2015 (aged 81)
- Occupation: Physiatrist
- Known for: Activism
- Spouse: Oktay Ekşi
- Children: 2

Aysel Ekşi (26 January 1934 – 14 May 2015) was a Turkish psychiatrist and professor.

== Early life and education ==
Ekşi graduated from the University of Ankara, Medical Faculty in 1960. She worked in Middlesex Hospital and Goodmayes Hospital in London in the capacity of registrar and consultant psychiatrist, and was qualified as a psychiatrist by the University of Ankara in 1966.

== Academic career ==
Ekşi worked from 1966 to 1967 at the Mental Health Dispensary in Ankara, as a specialist at the Ankara University Medical-Social Center from 1967 to 1974, and as the Director of the University of Istanbul Medical-Social Center between 1972 and 1982. She qualified as an Associate Professor in 1976 and a professor in 1982. From 1983 to 2001 she was a faculty member of University of Istanbul Pediatric Health Institute and the Istanbul Faculty of Medicine, where she conducted research about child and adolescent psychology.

== Activism ==
Ekşi became involved in the late 1980s in activities to protect the secular culture of Turkey from what she perceived to be threats posed by the fundamentalist movements. She organized panels, symposiums and conferences, and organized a march of 1000 women in Çağlayan, Istanbul in January 1989 to raise awareness of the dangers of fundamentalism. She collected thousands of signatures from women who supported the secular nature of the Republic of Turkey, which were presented to then President Kenan Evren. Ekşi initiated, wrote and organized a number of declarations at the University of Istanbul promoting awareness of the "Core Value of the Republic of Turkey".

Ekşi organized teams of volunteers before the 2007, 2009 and 2011 elections, for the purpose of raising awareness of what she considered key issues of the country.

Ekşi and some of her colleagues, in 1989, formed Cagdas Yasimi Destekleme Dernegi (The Association for the Support of Contemporary Living) where Aysel Ekşi was elected as the Founding Chairwoman. She held this role until June 1990.

== Publications ==
Ekşi wrote four published books about psychiatry and was editor of the book I'm Not Ill, also about psychiatry.

Ekşi wrote a book containing allegations of genocide by Armenians called Armenian Genocide. Ekşi was also the editor of the book Historical facts with documents and witnesses.

Ekşi's latest book The Youth of Turkey and Youth of Five Continents published by Nobel Books Publishing contains the results of eight years of research into adolescent psychiatry. Her research articles have been published in various international journals of science. One of the most recent published was a study of the psychological condition of children who lost relatives or loved ones in the August 1999 earthquake in the Marmara region of Turkey.

== Associations and community service ==
Ekşi as a member of Neuropsychiatry Association, Pediatric Psychology Association, Adolescent and Pediatric Foundation and the Children's Kidney Foundation.

Ekşi was elected to the board of directors of ÇEKUL (Cevre ve Kultur Degerlerini Koruma ve Tanitma Vakfi – The Foundation for the Protection and Promotion of the Environment and Cultural Heritage). At CEKUL, she originated and implemented the "7 Trees" programme. On the assumption that each individual consumes approximately seven trees in a year, at least seven trees are planted for each participant of the campaign. More than 2 million trees have been planted in Istanbul and its environs as a result of the programme.

Ekşi was elected as President of Bizim Ulke Association (Our Country). This association provided primary school children living in less privileged neighbourhoods of Istanbul with summer and weekend activities and courses in sports, theatre, foreign languages, and nature. Bizim Ulke Association organised "First Aid Training Courses" for school children and the public after the August 1999 Marmara earthquake.

== Personal ==
She was married to journalist Oktay Ekşi, and the mother of two sons Mehmet and Özgür. She died in May 2015.

== See also ==
- Article in the Turkish Wikipedia
- Google Scholar report
