= CHPF =

Protein-coding gene in humans

Identifiers
- Aliases: CHPF, CHSY2, CSS2, chondroitin polymerizing factor
- External IDs: OMIM: 610405; MGI: 106576; GeneCards: CHPF

Gene location (Human)
Chr.	Chromosome 2 (human)
Band	2q35	Start	219,538,954 bp
Band	2q35	End	219,543,809 bp

Gene location (Mouse)
Chr.	Chromosome 1 (mouse)
Band	1 C4|1 39.14 cM	Start	75,451,213 bp
Band	1 C4|1 39.14 cM	End	75,455,951 bp
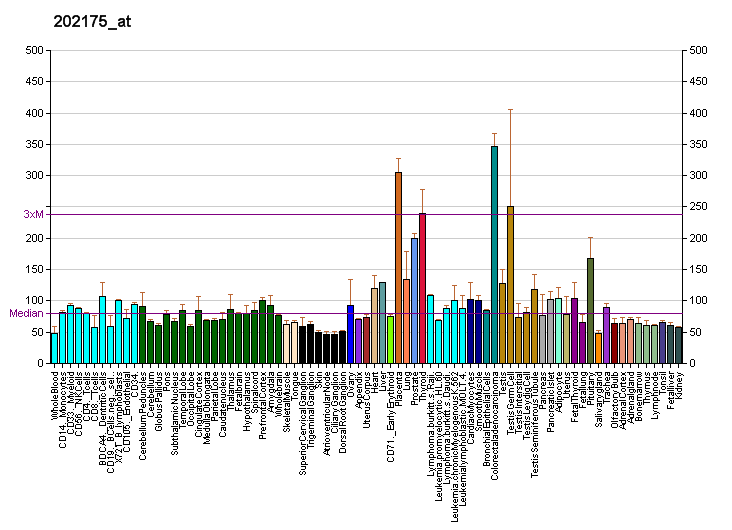
RNA expression pattern
Bgee	Human / Mouse (ortholog); Top expressed in: decidua; anterior pituitary; stromal cell of endometrium; apex of heart; right auricle of heart; ascending aorta; left ovary; body of pancreas; right ovary; right coronary artery / Top expressed in: CA3 field; primary visual cortex; superior frontal gyrus; perirhinal cortex; entorhinal cortex; ankle joint; lactiferous gland; dentate gyrus of hippocampal formation granule cell; choroid plexus of fourth ventricle; yolk sac; More reference expression data
BioGPS	More reference expression data
Gene ontology
Molecular function	transferase activity; acetylgalactosaminyltransferase activity; protein binding; metal ion binding; glycosyltransferase activity; N-acetylgalactosaminyl-proteoglycan 3-beta-glucuronosyltransferase activity; glucuronosyl-N-acetylgalactosaminyl-proteoglycan 4-beta-N-acetylgalactosaminyltransferase activity
Cellular component	cytoplasm; integral component of membrane; Golgi cisterna membrane; cytosol; Golgi membrane; mitochondrial matrix; Golgi apparatus; mitochondrion; membrane
Biological process	chondroitin sulfate biosynthetic process
Sources:Amigo / QuickGO
Orthologs
Databases	NCBI: entry; OMA: entry
Species	Human	Mouse
Entrez	79586	74241
Ensembl	ENSG00000123989	ENSMUSG00000032997
UniProt	Q8IZ52	Q6IQX7
RefSeq (mRNA)	NM_001195731; NM_024536	NM_001001565; NM_001001566
RefSeq (protein)	NP_001182660; NP_078812	NP_001001565; NP_001001566
Location (UCSC)	Chr 2: 219.54 – 219.54 Mb	Chr 1: 75.45 – 75.46 Mb
PubMed search
- Wikidata
View/Edit Human	View/Edit Mouse

Chondroitin sulfate synthase 2 is an enzyme that in humans is encoded by the CHPF gene.
