= Masum Türker =

Turkish politician (born 1951)

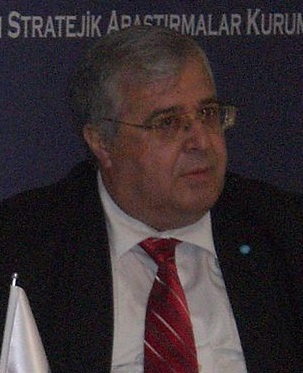
- Türker in 2010

Chairman of the Democratic Left Party
- In office 18 May 2009 – 13 December 2015
- Preceded by: Saffet Başaran
- Succeeded by: Önder Aksakal

Minister of State Responsible for Economy
- In office 10 August 2002 – 18 November 2002
- Preceded by: Kemal Derviş
- Succeeded by: Ali Babacan

Personal details
- Born: 1951 (age 74–75) Mardin, Turkey

Masum Türker (born 1951) is a Turkish politician and leader of the Democratic Left Party from 2009 until 2015. He was a minister of state in the 57th cabinet of Turkey. He graduated from Istanbul University.

Party political offices
Preceded by Zeki Sezer	Leader of the Democratic Left Party (DSP); 2009–2015	Incumbent
