= Oktay Ekşi =

Turkish politician

Member of the Grand National Assembly (24th Parliament)
- In office 28 June 2011 – 23 June 2015
- Constituency: Istanbul (III)

Personal details
- Born: Osman Oktay Ekşi; 7 December 1932 (age 93)
- Party: Republican People's Party (CHP), Social Democracy Party (SODEP),
- Spouse: Aysel Ekşi (died 2015)
- Children: 2
- Education: Law
- Alma mater: Ankara University
- Profession: Journalist, politician

Osman Oktay Ekşi (born 7 December 1932) is a Turkish journalist, author and politician. He has spent much of his career at the newspaper Hürriyet, and was its Chief Columnist from 1974 to 1983 and from 1985 to 2010. A founding member and vice chairman of the Social Democratic Party (SODEP), he was elected as a member of Parliament for the Republican People's Party (CHP) in the 2011 general election.

== Journalism career ==
He started his journalism career as a reporter for the Ankara News Agency (ANKA) in 1952. Between 1952 and 1954, he was the Ankara Correspondent for Dünya ("World"), a daily newspaper. He served as Ankara Bureau Chief of Dünya between 1954 and 1960.

After serving as local secretary at the Turkish Consulate General in London from 1962 to 1996, he returned to Turkey in 1966 to take up a job as Ankara bureau chief of Yeni Gazete daily (an affiliate of Hürriyet daily) which lasted until 1970. After working one year (between 1970-1971) at the Turkish Radio and Television Network (TRT) he joined Hurriyet newspaper in 1971 in Ankara as a correspondent at large. He became Ankara bureau chief in 1972, and in 1974 he was appointed as the chief (leading) columnist of Hürriyet. He fulfilled this position until 1983, during which time (between 1974 and 1982) he was general manager of Hürriyet News Agency ("Hürriyet Haber Ajansı").

In 1984, Ekşi became chief (leading) columnist of Güneş daily but rejoined Hürriyet which had the largest circulation of any Turkish paper in 1985, serving as chief (leading) columnist until 2010. In 2010 Oktay Ekşi resigned from Hürriyet daily when one of his articles was taken as a personal insult by the then Prime Minister. Ekşi wrote that the plan to build hydroelectric complexes in hundreds of locations in Turkey, including Rize reflected a “mindset of one willing to sell his own mother”. The then Prime Minister Recep Tayyip Erdoğan, Energy and Natural Resources Minister Taner Yıldız and Environment and Forestry Minister Veysel Eroğlu reacted negatively to this criticism.

From 1988 to 2010, Oktay Ekşi was the chairman and leading founding member of the (Turkish) Press Council. He was also the Vice President and founding member of the World Association of Press Councils (WAPC) from 1992 to 2002. In 2002, Ekşi was elected president of the WAPC, a position which he served until 2009. Also between 1996 and 1998 he was the founding chairman and leading founding member of Basın Enstitüsü Derneği (the National Committee of International Press Institute) (IPI).

== Political career ==
In 1961, Oktay Ekşi was elected as a member of the press to the Constituent Assembly which drafted and passed the Turkish Constitution of 1961.

In 1983 until 1984, Ekşi served as vice chairman and founding member of the Social Democratic Party (SODEP).

Oktay Ekşi was elected as a member of Parliament for the Republican People's Party in the 2011 general election. He chaired the opening session of the 24th parliamentary term as the oldest Member of Parliament.

== Awards ==
Oktay Ekşi received numerous awards from various journalistic associations. In addition, he was awarded the Paul Harris Award by the 2430 Region of Rotary International in 1997. In 2003, Istanbul University gave Oktay Ekşi an honorary doctorate, in 2006 Ekşi was given a Distinguished Service Award by Middle East Technical University, and in 2012 he was awarded the "Atatürk Award" by the Atatürk Society of America.

== Personal life ==
Oktay Ekşi graduated from the Faculty of Law at the University of Ankara (1967).

Ekşi founded the first local direct democracy platform in 1991 in Mesüdiye. The "Mesüdiye Convention", which has convened four times per annum for more than 25 years, is a forum for citizens to discuss challenges, solutions and development plans for Mesüdiye.

Oktay Ekşi established the largest village library in Turkey (with 20,978 books as of March 2018). He is also the author of “Parlamento mu, Kanun Fabrikasi mı” (“Is it a Parliament, or a Law Making Factory”) published in 2013 and “Gazetecilikte Geçen O YILLAR” (“My life as a journalist in THOSE years”) published in 2017. His book “AYSEL, Bir Atatürk Kızının Hikayesi” (“AYSEL, The Story of a Daughter of Ataturk”) was published in March 2018.

Oktay Ekşi was married to Professor Dr. Aysel Ekşi. He has two sons Mehmet and Özgür and two grandchildren Sibel and Sinan.
