= Türkan Saylan =

Turkish dermatologist, professor and activist

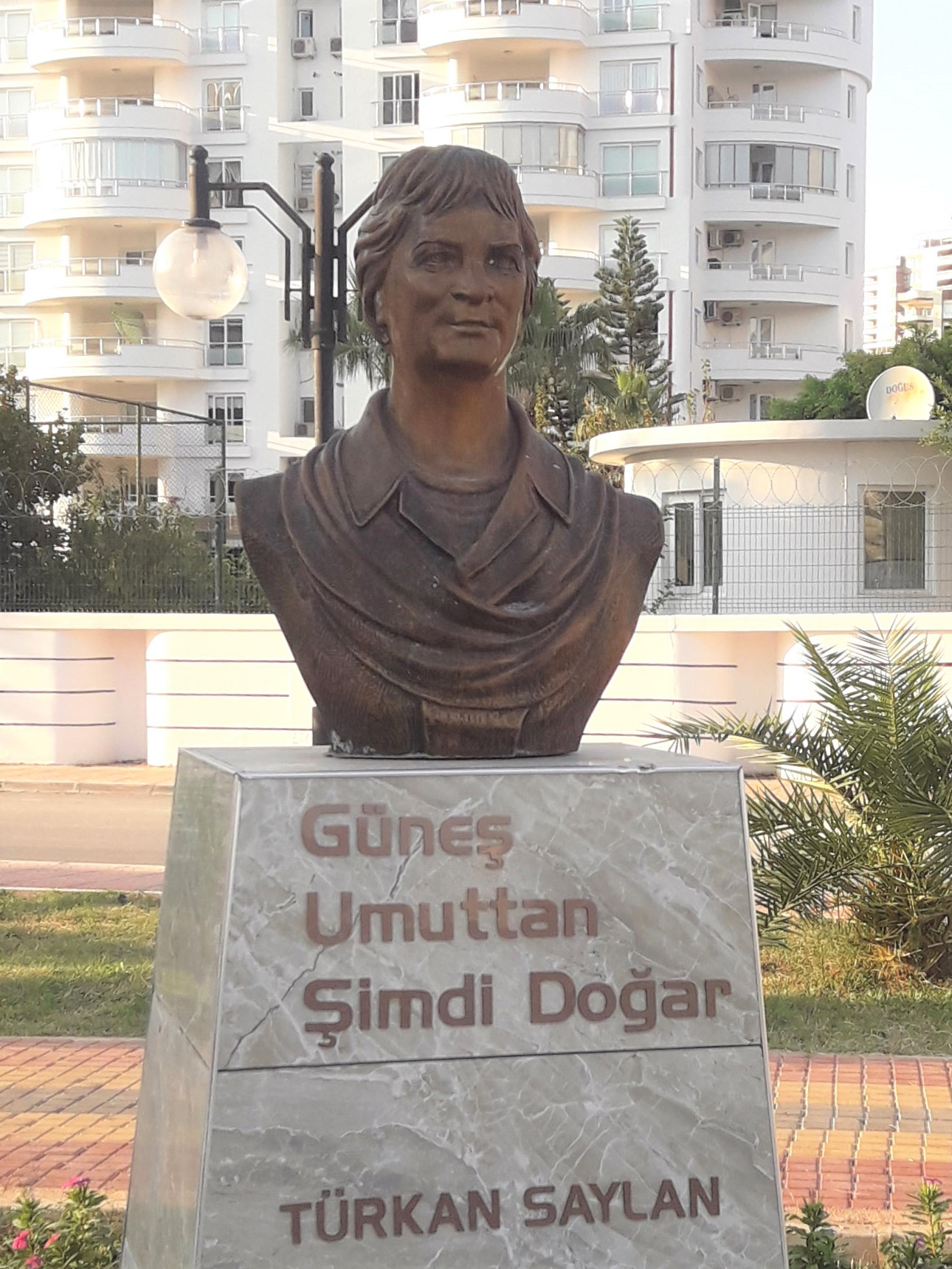
- Bust of Türkan Saylan in Mersin
- Born: 13 December 1935; Istanbul, Turkey
- Died: 18 May 2009 (aged 73); Istanbul, Turkey
- Education: Istanbul University Faculty of Medicine
- Occupations: Physician, dermatologist, professor, academic, writer, activist

Türkan Saylan (13 December 1935 – 18 May 2009) was a Turkish physician, dermatologist, professor, academic, writer, public-health campaigner and civil-society activist. A professor of dermatology at Istanbul University, she became a prominent figure in Turkey's campaign against leprosy and later devoted much of her work to expanding educational opportunities, particularly for girls and students from low-income families.

Saylan began working against leprosy in 1976 and founded the Turkish Leprosy Relief Association. She later directed Istanbul University's Leprosy Research and Application Center and served for 21 years as the voluntary chief physician of the Istanbul Leprosy Hospital. She also served as a consultant to the World Health Organization on leprosy until 2006.

Her approach to leprosy emphasized both medical treatment and social rehabilitation. Programs associated with her work addressed disability, social exclusion and poverty, providing patients with services including protective footwear and eyewear, social and economic rehabilitation and educational support for their children.

In 1989, Saylan co-founded the Association for the Support of Contemporary Living (Çağdaş Yaşamı Destekleme Derneği, ÇYDD), which developed scholarship and education programs for students throughout Turkey. By 2007, the organization had helped approximately 25,000 girls continue to secondary education and had provided scholarships to approximately 20,000 university students.

== Early life and education ==
Saylan was born in Istanbul on 13 December 1935, the eldest of five children of Fasih Galip and Lili Mina Raiman. Her mother was Swiss and used the name Leyla after her marriage.

She attended Kandilli Primary School from 1944 to 1946 and Kandilli Girls' High School from 1946 to 1953. She graduated from the Istanbul University Faculty of Medicine in 1963.

During medical school, Saylan experienced serious illness herself, including spinal tuberculosis, requiring prolonged treatment. She nevertheless completed medical school and pursued specialization in dermatology and venereal diseases.

== Medical and academic career ==
Between 1964 and 1968, Saylan completed her specialization in dermatology and venereology at SSK Nişantaşı Hospital. In 1968, she joined the Department of Dermatology at the Istanbul University Faculty of Medicine as a chief assistant.

She received a British Council scholarship in 1971 for advanced training in the United Kingdom and subsequently undertook additional periods of study in France and the United Kingdom.

Saylan became an associate professor in 1972 and a full professor in 1977. From 1982 to 1987, she served as chair of the Department of Dermatology at Istanbul University Faculty of Medicine.

Her academic and clinical work included dermatopathology, Behçet's disease, sexually transmitted infections and leprosy. She was involved in establishing a dermatopathology laboratory and specialized clinics for Behçet's disease and sexually transmitted diseases at Istanbul University.

From 1981 to 2001, she directed the Istanbul University Faculty of Medicine's Leprosy Research and Application Center. Alongside her university position, she served voluntarily as chief physician of the Ministry of Health's Istanbul Leprosy Hospital from 1981 to 2002.

She continued as a faculty member in the Department of Dermatology until her retirement in December 2002.

== Work against leprosy ==
Saylan began focusing on leprosy in 1976, at a time when people affected by the disease continued to face considerable medical and social stigma in Turkey.

She founded the Turkish Leprosy Relief Association (Cüzzamla Savaş Derneği) in 1976 and later helped establish the Istanbul University Leprosy Research and Application Center. The Istanbul Leprosy Hospital began operating as an independent specialist hospital in 1981.

Saylan became involved in Turkey's national leprosy-control efforts and worked with teams that travelled to communities where cases had been identified. Their work included the diagnosis and treatment of people affected by leprosy as well as physical and social rehabilitation.

A distinctive feature of the approach developed by Saylan and her colleagues was the emphasis on needs extending beyond medical treatment. According to the WHO Goodwill Ambassador's Newsletter for the Elimination of Leprosy, Saylan believed that treating leprosy with medication alone was insufficient if patients continued to experience disability, poverty and social exclusion.

Patients were provided, where needed, with protective footwear and glasses, while programs offered assistance with physical, social and economic rehabilitation. Volunteers also raised funds for scholarships for the children of people affected by leprosy and supported projects intended to help families earn an income.

The same publication described the approach used by Saylan and her team as holistic, combining medical care with social support.

By 2007, Turkey had long since eliminated leprosy as a public-health problem, with only seven new cases reported during the preceding year. The WHO Goodwill Ambassador's publication described Saylan as having played a pivotal role in the country's efforts against the disease.

Saylan served as a consultant to the World Health Organization on leprosy until 2006. She was also a founding member of the International Leprosy Union and was affiliated with international dermatology and leprosy organizations.

In 1986, she and Indian leprosy specialist Dharmendra received the International Gandhi Award for their work in leprosy.

Her work in leprosy also influenced the direction of her later educational activism. Working in rural and economically disadvantaged communities exposed her to barriers faced by children, particularly girls, in accessing continued education.

== Education and the Association for the Support of Contemporary Living ==
In 1989, Saylan and a group of academics and other volunteers founded the Association for the Support of Contemporary Living (Çağdaş Yaşamı Destekleme Derneği, ÇYDD). She served as its president for many years and remained its president at the time of her death.

The association sought to expand access to education and promote equal educational opportunities through scholarships, schools, dormitories and other educational initiatives.

A major focus of ÇYDD's work was helping girls from economically disadvantaged communities continue their education beyond primary school. The organization also provided scholarships to university students from families with limited financial resources.

By December 2007, ÇYDD had 95 branches throughout Turkey. According to the WHO Goodwill Ambassador's Newsletter for the Elimination of Leprosy, it had helped approximately 25,000 girls continue to secondary education and had provided scholarships to approximately 20,000 university students.

Saylan's familiarity with southeastern Turkey through her earlier leprosy work contributed to ÇYDD's educational programs in areas where access to schooling, particularly for girls, was limited.

== Kardelenler project ==
One of the best-known education initiatives associated with Saylan and ÇYDD was the Kardelenler ("Snowdrops") project, developed in cooperation with Turkcell beginning in 2000.

The project provided scholarships to girls whose families lacked the financial resources to enable them to continue their education. It sought not only to keep students in school but also to help them complete secondary education, attend university and enter professional life.

By June 2007, according to Turkcell, 12,300 students had received scholarships through the program. Of those students, 7,380 had completed high school, 950 had passed university entrance examinations and 67 had graduated from university.

In 2007, Turkcell announced that the annual number of scholarships supported through the project would be doubled from 5,000 to 10,000 girls per year.

The project became one of the most prominent initiatives associated with ÇYDD and Saylan's campaign for educational opportunity for girls.

== Women's rights and civil-society work ==
Saylan's work expanded beyond medicine and education into women's rights and civil society.

In 1990, she participated in the establishment of Istanbul University's Women's Issues Research and Application Center. She subsequently served as deputy director and coordinated courses on women's health.

She was also a founder of the Association of University Faculty Members and was involved with a number of organizations concerned with education, children, health and civil society.

Saylan publicly supported secular education, women's participation in public life and equal access to education. She viewed educational opportunity as closely connected to social and economic independence, particularly for girls and young women.

== 2009 investigation ==
In April 2009, while Saylan was undergoing treatment for advanced cancer, her home and offices associated with ÇYDD were searched as part of the Ergenekon investigation. She was not arrested.

Saylan rejected allegations that ÇYDD supported a military intervention. She stated that the organization opposed both religious rule and military coups and supported democracy and contemporary values.

== Awards and recognition ==
Saylan received numerous national and international awards for her contributions to medicine, public health, education and civil society.

In 1986, she received the International Gandhi Award in India in recognition of her work against leprosy and the medical and social rehabilitation of people affected by the disease.

In February 2009, she received the Vehbi Koç Award in the field of education. The Vehbi Koç Foundation cited her lifelong contributions to education and her role in developing and implementing educational projects.

The foundation also emphasized the broader social impact of her work and her efforts to improve people's quality of life through education.

== Publications and teaching ==
Alongside her clinical and civil-society work, Saylan maintained an academic career in dermatology and medical education.

She trained medical students, residents and physicians at Istanbul University and published extensively in medicine, particularly in dermatology, venereology and leprosy.

The International Leprosy Association's history project credits her bibliography with more than 400 publications, including medical research, articles on social issues, a dermatovenereology textbook and memoirs.

Her books included the memoir At Kız ("Horse Girl") and Güneş Umuttan Şimdi Doğar ("The Sun Rises Now Out of Hope"), which addressed aspects of her life, activism and personal experiences.

== Personal life and death ==
Saylan married in 1957 and had two sons. One became a physician and the other a graphic designer. She had two grandchildren.

She lived with breast cancer for many years while continuing her academic, medical, educational and civil-society work.

Saylan died in Istanbul on 18 May 2009 at the age of 73. She was buried at Zincirlikuyu Cemetery.

== Legacy ==
Saylan's career brought together medicine, public health, rehabilitation, education and civil society.

Her work against leprosy was notable for addressing the consequences of the disease beyond infection itself. Alongside diagnosis and medical treatment, Saylan and her colleagues emphasized physical rehabilitation, economic independence, education and the reintegration of people affected by leprosy into society.

This experience contributed to her later focus on educational inequality. Communities she encountered through leprosy-control work included areas where poverty and limited educational opportunities affected children's futures, particularly those of girls.

Through ÇYDD and projects including Kardelenler, Saylan subsequently applied this focus on equal opportunity to education on a national scale. By 2007, tens of thousands of secondary-school and university students had received educational support through ÇYDD programs.

In a 2007 account of her work, Saylan summarized her approach to social problems by urging supporters not merely to praise individuals working for change, but to participate in solving problems themselves.

Her life and work have subsequently been the subject of biographies, academic publications and cultural works. Ayşe Kulin wrote Türkan: Tek ve Tek Başına, a biographical work based on Saylan's life.

== See also ==
- Women in Turkey
- Women in medicine
- Leprosy
- Association for the Support of Contemporary Living
