= Konya Technical University =

Public university in Konya, Turkey

- Konya Teknik Üniversitesi
- Logo of Konya Technical University
- Motto: Gelişimin Öncüsü (Pioneer of Progress)
- Type: Public university
- Established: 1970 (as Konya State Academy of Engineering and Architecture); 2018 (as Konya Technical University)
- Rector: Prof. Dr. Osman Nuri Çelik
- Students: 12,298 (2024)
- Location: Akademi Mahallesi, Yeni İstanbul Cad. No:235/1, Selçuklu, Konya, Konya, Turkey; 38.026366°N 32.509595°E
- Campus: Gelişim Campus Alaeddin Keykubat Campus
- Colours: Red, White
- Nickname: KTUN
- Website: www.ktun.edu.tr

Konya Technical University (Turkish: Konya Teknik Üniversitesi) is a public university in Konya, Turkey, officially established in 2018 after separating from Selçuk University. The university’s academic roots date back to the founding of the Konya State Academy of Engineering and Architecture in 1970.

As of 2024, KTUN has over 12,000 students across four faculties, one vocational school, and one graduate institute, with a strong focus on engineering, architecture, and applied sciences.

== History ==
Engineering and architecture education in Konya began in 1970 with the establishment of the Konya State Academy of Engineering and Architecture. The academy was incorporated as the Faculty of Engineering and Architecture under Selçuk University in 1982. In 2018, it became an independent institution under the name Konya Technical University.

== Campuses ==
The main campus of KTUN is the Gelişim Campus, previously belonging to Mevlana University. It houses the Rectorate and Faculty of Architecture and Design. Other faculties are located on the Alaeddin Keykubat Campus of Selçuk University. New campus sites near Ardıçlı and the Konya Organized Industrial Zone are planned for future expansion.

== Academic Units ==
=== Faculties ===
- Faculty of Engineering and Natural Sciences (includes Computer, Environmental, Electrical-Electronics, Industrial, Geomatics, Civil, Geological, Chemical, Mining, Mechanical, Metallurgical & Materials, Artificial Intelligence, and Software Engineering departments)
- Faculty of Architecture and Design (Architecture, Urban and Regional Planning)
- Faculty of Business and Management Sciences
- Faculty of Agricultural Sciences and Technologies

=== Vocational School ===
- Vocational School of Technical Sciences (offers programs in Computer, Electrical, Food, Construction, Chemistry, Machinery, Textiles, etc.)

=== Graduate Institute ===
- Graduate School of Education (master's and PhD programs)

=== Research Centers ===
KTUN hosts a number of research and application centers, including Energy Technologies, Obruk Research, Nanotechnology, Continuing Education, and Aerospace & Defense Technologies.

== Rankings and Achievements ==
- In the 2024 URAP national rankings, KTUN ranked 41st among public universities and 50th overall in Turkey.
- Ranked 43rd in the 2022 TÜBİTAK Entrepreneurial and Innovative University Index.
- Placed 11th among state universities in the 2024 National University Satisfaction Survey (TÜMA).

== Rectors ==
- Prof. Dr. Mustafa Şahin (Founding, 2018)
- Prof. Dr. Babür Özçelik (2018–2022)
- Prof. Dr. Osman Nuri Çelik (2022–present)
