= İsmail Cem =

Turkish centre-leftist politician, intellectual, writer, author (1940–2007)

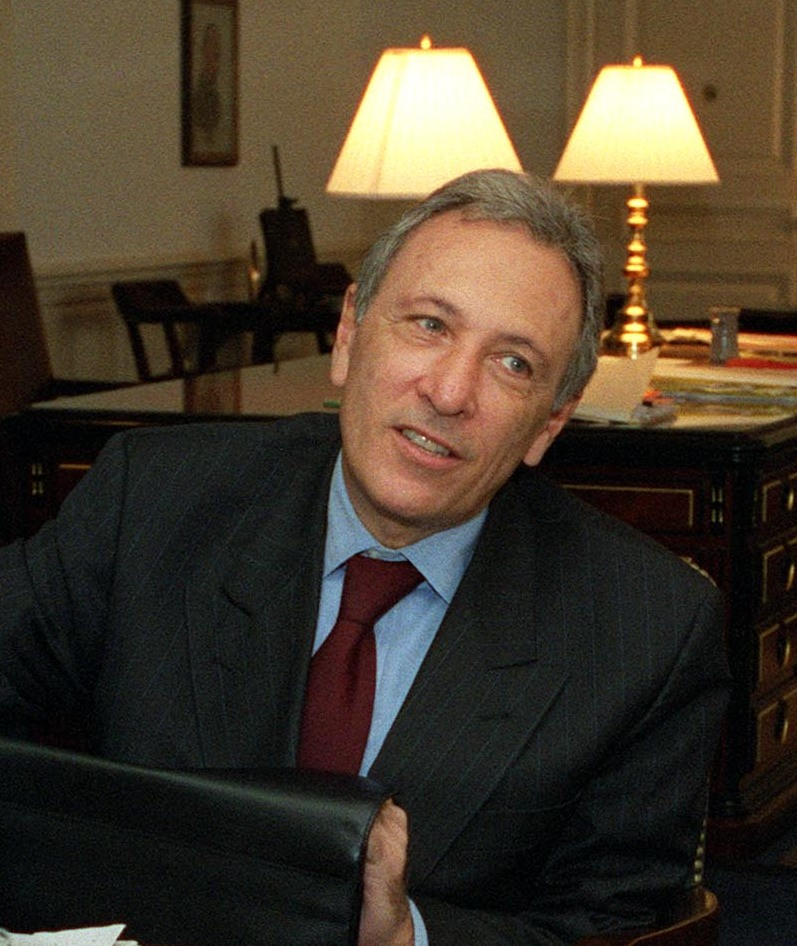
- Cem, as the Minister of Foreign Affairs, 2001

Minister of Foreign Affairs
- In office 30 June 1997 – 11 July 2002
- Prime Minister: Mesut Yılmaz, Bülent Ecevit
- Preceded by: Tansu Çiller
- Succeeded by: Şükrü Sina Gürel

Minister of Culture of Turkey
- In office 7 July 1995 – 26 October 1995
- Prime Minister: Tansu Çiller
- Preceded by: Ercan Karakaş
- Succeeded by: Köksal Toptan

Personal details
- Born: 15 February 1940 Nişantaşı, Istanbul, Turkey
- Died: 24 January 2007 (aged 66) Istanbul, Turkey
- Party: CHP (1958–1980, 1992–1995); SDP (1983–1985); SHP (1985–1992); DSP (1995–2002); YTP (2002–2004); SDHP (2004–2007)
- Spouse: Elçin Trak
- Children: 2
- Relatives: Abdi İpekçi (cousin); Cemil İpekçi (cousin)
- Education: Robert College
- Alma mater: University of Lausanne (LLB); Sciences Po Paris (MA)
- Profession: Journalist, politician, writer, statesman

İsmail Cem (born İsmail Cem İpekçi, 15 February 1940 – 24 January 2007) was a Turkish centre-leftist politician, intellectual, writer and journalist who served as the Minister of Culture of Turkey from 7 July to 26 October, 1995, and Minister of Foreign Affairs of Turkey from 30 June 1997 to 11 July 2002.

== Background ==
İsmail Cem finished high school at Robert College in İstanbul in 1959 and graduated from the Law School at the University of Lausanne, Switzerland in 1963. He had his master's degree in sociology of politics at the École Libre des Sciences Politiques in 1983, Paris, France. He was an exchange student with AFS Intercultural Programs at Piedmont High School, Piedmont California for one year during his high school years after Işık Koleji.

Cem was the cousin of murdered liberal-leftist journalist, intellectual and human rights activist Abdi İpekçi, the editor in chief for then centre-leftist Milliyet newspaper. Cem was the son of İhsan İpekçi (1901-1966), who was one of the pioneers of the Turkish cinema industry, as the founder and partner of İpek Film, and several popular Istanbul movie theaters including Yeni Melek and İpek and his mother Zerife. İsmail Cem was an avid photographer, and held four photo exhibits in his lifetime, and published a book Mevsim, Mevsim (Seasons, Seasons).

== Journalism ==
Returning home in 1963, Cem started his professional career as a journalist. He worked in some major newspapers who published articles and became a columnist for Milliyet, Cumhuriyet and Politika, where he served as the editor in chief for the second newspaper from 1964 until 1966. Between 1971 and 1974, he served as the chief of the Istanbul office within the Turkish Newspaper Workers Union. In 1974–1975, he acted as the general manager of the state-owned Turkish Radio and Television Corporation (TRT) under the 37th and 38th governments. Cem's tenure as the general manager of TRT, then the only TV station in Turkey, created some controversy. The conservatives and prominent right-wing figures like future President of Turkey Süleyman Demirel used their political and social influence to remove İpekçi from his post in several attempts, which have all proven fruitless.

== Writing career ==
Among with his political and journalistic successes, İpekçi is also known as one of the ideologists of social democracy in Turkey, and was counted among the prominent figures within the Turkish centre-left. İpekçi, who advocated a moderate agenda in a time of political turmoil, wrote extensive accounts of the economic and social factors lying beneath Turkey's underdevelopment and theorized methods for the revitalization of Turkish left. Among his books are Turkiye'de Geri Kalmışlığın Tarihi (A History of Underdevelopment in Turkey), one of the most acclaimed books in the field of social sciences in Turkey and Sosyal Demokrasi Nedir?, Ne Değildir? (What is and What is not Social Democracy?), one of the first books to introduce social democracy to Turkish politics. İpekçi's books, characterized by their plain but informative nature, are still popular and are growing even more popular, especially in light of the current dissent against AKP's Islamism and the debate of reformation in Turkish left. He is also labeled as the visionary of the "Anatolian Left (Anadolu Solu)". A more detailed bibliography of his works can be found below.

== Political career ==
He entered politics after being elected deputy of Istanbul from the Kadıköy district in the general elections held in 1987. He was re-elected in 1991 again from Istanbul and in 1995 from Kayseri. After the death of President Turgut Özal in 1993, he ran for president without success. In 1995, Cem left the Republican People's Party (CHP) and joined the Democratic Left Party (DSP). He was then appointed Minister of Culture. He served as minister of foreign affairs from 30 June 1997 until 11 July 2002. He was the fourth longest-serving minister of this position in Turkey.

=== Relations with the European Union ===
He negotiated candidate status for Turkey's bid to join the European Union as foreign minister. He was largely credited with Turkey's declaration as a full member candidate during the Helsinki Summit Meeting in 1999, after much negotiation with the EU and a night trip by EU foreign policy chief Javier Solana and the then European Commissioner Günter Verheugen to Ankara to iron out the last details.

=== Relations with Greece ===
Cem and his Greek counterpart George Papandreou worked to improve Turkish-Greek relations. It is during his tenure as foreign minister that a confident, albeit a step-by-step approach was taken towards a rapprochement between Turkey and Greece. The relations were actually at an all-time low after the Abdullah Öcalan affair, whereby Greek Foreign Minister Theodoros Pangalos and some officials of the Greek Foreign Ministry were involved in hiding organization PKK leader prior to his arrest by the Turkish police. İpekçi and Papandreou picked up the historically hostile relationships initially starting with some confidence measures.

== Later political career and illness ==
After a dispute with the party leader Bülent Ecevit, he resigned from the Democratic Left Party (DSP) ahead of 2002 parliamentary elections and formed the New Turkey Party (YTP) on 20 July 2002 together with his former party colleague Hüsamettin Özkan and Zeki Eker. İsmail Cem was elected leader of YTP, which did not do well in the elections.

Returning from the United States, where he was due to medical treatment of pulmonary cancer, he closed YTP on 24 October 2004, joining the CHP, despite newly affiliated with the SDHP until his death. İsmail Cem was acting as the chief advisor to Deniz Baykal, the leader of CHP, and lectured in Applied Foreign Politics of Turkey at the Istanbul Bilgi University until his death.

He was married to Elçin Trak, and the couple had a daughter, İpek Cem Taha, and a son, Kerim Cem.

== Death and Funeral ==
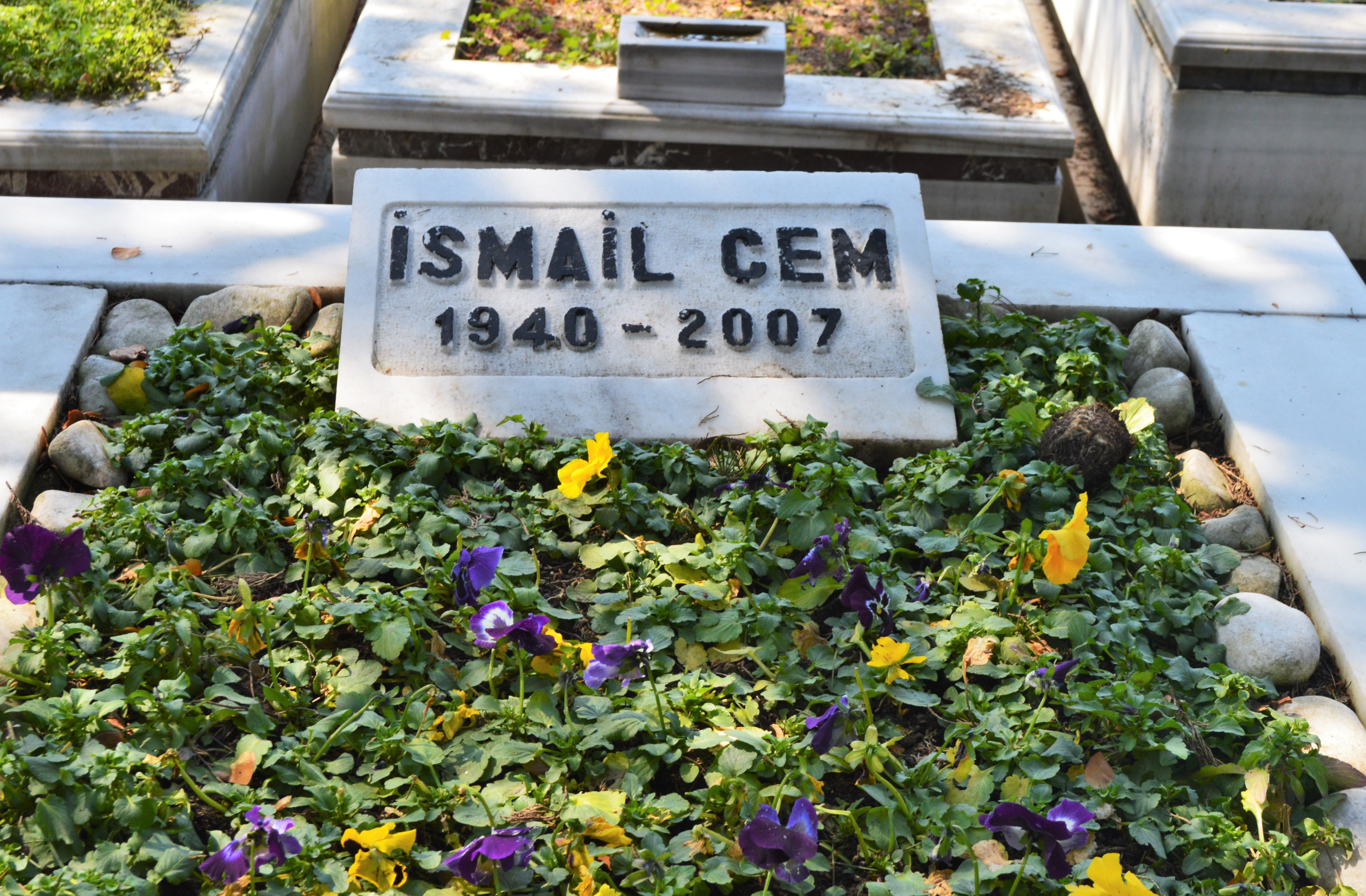
Grave of İsmail Cem in Zincirlikuyu Cemetery, Istanbul

İsmail Cem died on 24 January 2007 in İstanbul after suffering for two years from lung cancer. He was honored with a state funeral, at which Speaker of the Parliament Bülent Arınç, Prime Minister Recep Tayyip Erdoğan, current and former leaders of the political parties, his close friend former Minister of Foreign Affairs of Greece, George Papandreou and Greek Deputy Minister of Foreign Affairs Theodoros Kasimis attended.

He was interred at the Zincirlikuyu Cemetery. Papandreou laid on his grave a branch from the olive tree they both had planted 2000 in Greece as a symbol of peace.

== Legacy ==
İsmail Cem was especially admired by young people in Turkey during his time as a foreign minister. Some polls indicated that young people desired to see Cem as President of Turkey. İsmail Cem's biography written by Turkish political scientist Ozan Örmeci, "Portrait of a Turkish Social Democrat: İsmail Cem" and its Turkish version "Bir Türk Sosyal Demokratı: İsmail Cem" found many readers among Turkish intellectuals and showed Cem's unique place in Turkish social democratic movement.

== Awards ==
In 2000, Cem was honored by US-based "East West Institute" think tank with the Statesman of the Year award together with the Greek Minister of Foreign Affairs George Papandreou for fostering closer relations between the two nations.

== Bibliography ==
- Türkiye'de Geri Kalmışlığın Tarihi (History of Under Development in Turkey), 512 pp, Can, ISBN 975-510-791-6
- Türkiye Üzerine Yazılar (Articles on Turkey)
- 12 Mart (12 March) (Referring to 12 March 1971, the date of military coup)
- TRT'de 500 Gün (500 Days at TRT) (TRT is the Turkish state television)
- Siyaset Yazıları (Notes about Politics)
- Geçiş Dönemi Türkiye'si (Turkey in a Period of Transition)
- Sosyal Demokrasi ya da Demokratik Sosyalizm Nedir, Ne Değildir? (What is, What is not Social Democracy Or Democratic Socialism?), 311 pp, Can, ISBN 975-510-801-7
- Türkiye'de Sosyal Demokrasi (Social Democracy in Turkey)
- Engeller ve Çözümler (Obstacles and Solutions)
- Yeni Sol, Sol'daki Arayış (The New Left, Seek in the Left), 340 pp, Can, ISBN 975-8440-16-0
- Gelecek İçin Denemeler (Essays about the Future), 344 pp, Can, ISBN 975-8440-18-7
- Türkiye, Avrupa, Avrasya I, Strateji-Yunanistan-Kıbrıs (Turkey, Europe, Eurasia I, Strategy-Greece-Cyprus), 298 pp, Istanbul Bilgi University (2004), ISBN 975-6857-88-9
- Avrupa'nın Birliği ve Türkiye (Union of Europe and Turkey), 364 pp, Istanbul Bilgi University (2005), ISBN 975-6176-27-X

Political offices
Preceded by Ercan Karakaş	Minister of Culture of Turkey; 7 July 1995 – 26 October 1995	Succeeded by Köksal Toptan
Preceded by Tansu Çiller	Minister of Foreign Affairs of Turkey; 30 June 1997 – 11 July 2002	Succeeded by Şükrü Sina Gürel
