= Zeki Sezer =

Turkish politician

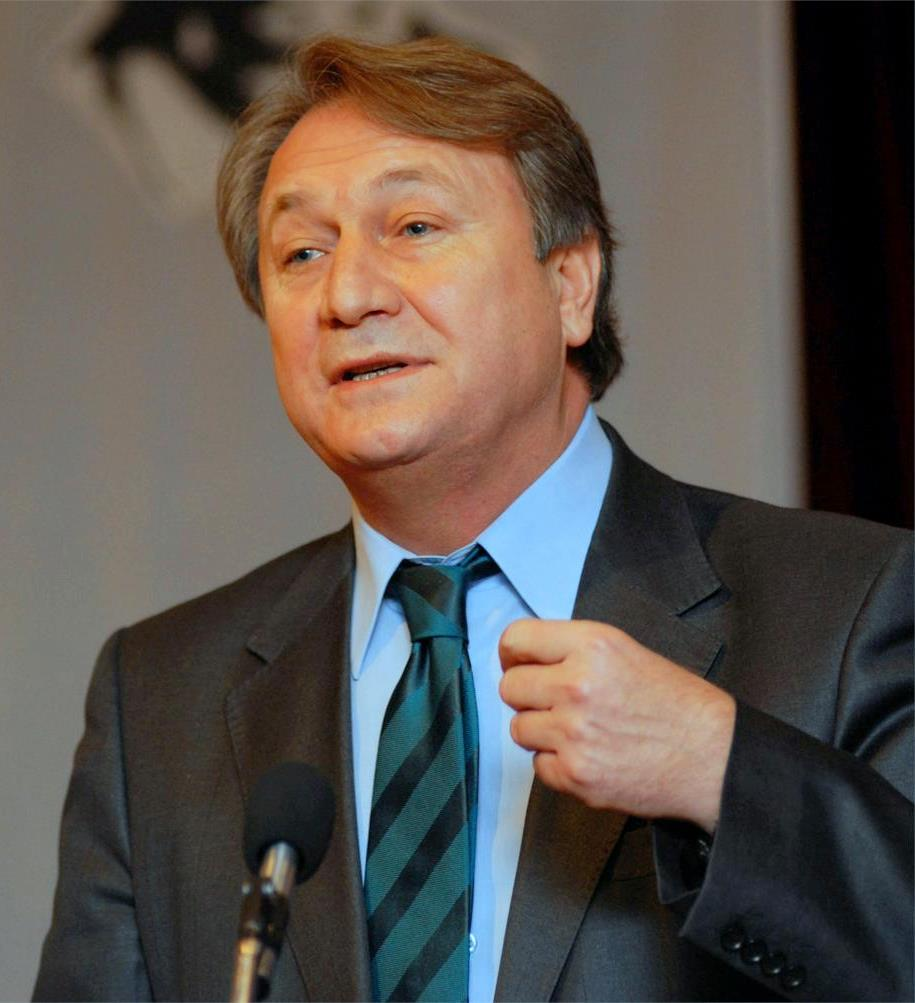

Chairman of the Democratic Left Party
- In office July 25, 2004 – April 11, 2009
- Preceded by: Bülent Ecevit
- Succeeded by: Masum Türker

Personal details
- Born: Mehmet Zeki Sezer; 12 April 1957 (age 69) Eskişehir, Turkey
- Party: Democratic Left Party
- Spouse: Ülkenur Sezer (died 2014)
- Children: 2
- Education: Gazi University
- Profession: Politician and chemical engineer

Mehmet Zeki Sezer (born 12 April 1957) is a Turkish politician and former chairman of the Democratic Left Party (Demokratik Sol Parti, DSP), he was elected in the 6th ordinary party congress in 2004 after the resignation of Bülent Ecevit.

== Early years ==
Sezer was born in 1957 in Eskişehir. He graduated from M. Rüştü Uzel Chemistry Vocational High School and then from the School of Chemical Engineering at Gazi Üniversitesi in Ankara. He completed his 4-month short-term military service in 1983.

== Early career ==
During his high school and university years, Sezer played volleyball for various clubs. He has a special interest in arts. Sezer began his career as a chemistry technician in 1975 in the public service and later worked as a chemical engineer. He worked also in the private sector in the same capacity.

== Political career ==
His political career in the DSP started in 1988. Sezer served as an executive of Çankaya branch of DSP, as deputy-chairman of Ankara branch and became a board member in 1991. He also served twice as the party's secretary-general. Between 2001 and 2004 he was the deputy chairman of DSP. In 2004 party congress succeeded Ecevit. However, in 2009 he lost this post to Masum Türker. In 1999, Sezer was elected as deputy of Ankara to the Parliament and served as a minister of state in the 57th government under the Prime minister Bülent Ecevit

== Family life ==
Sezer is married and has two children.

Party political offices
Preceded by Bülent Ecevit	Leader of the Democratic Left Party (DSP); 2004–2009	Succeeded by Masum Türker
