= Democratic Left Party (Turkey) =

Political party in Turkey

Democratic Left Party Demokratik Sol Parti
- Abbreviation: DSP
- Leader: Önder Aksakal
- Founders: Rahşan Ecevit
- Founded: 14 November 1985
- Headquarters: Mareşal Fevzi Çakmak Cad.17, Beşevler - Ankara, Turkey
- Membership (2026): ▲23,058
- Ideology: Ecevitism; Kemalism; Social democracy Left-wing nationalism Anti-communism
- Political position: Centre-left
- International affiliation: Socialist International; Progressive Alliance
- Colors: Light blue, White and Red
- Grand National Assembly: 1 / 600
- District municipalities: 1 / 922
- Belde Municipalities: 1 / 388
- Municipal Assemblies: 28 / 20,952

Website
- https://www.dsp.org.tr/

The Democratic Left Party (Turkish: Demokratik Sol Parti, DSP) is a Turkish political party, founded on 14 November 1985 by Rahşan Ecevit.

== History ==
=== 1985–1999 ===
The DSP, a social-democratic oriented party, was registered on 14 November 1985 by Rahşan Ecevit, wife of Bülent Ecevit, as he was banned from political life after the 1980 coup d'état.

In 1986, Bülent Ecevit addressed the DSP convention in Ankara, declaring his support for the party. The address landed him in court for allegedly violating the political bans. The DSP was unable, however, to achieve a substantial showing in the 1986 Turkish parliamentary by-elections even though Ecevit, despite his ban, continued to campaign at the party's rallies as a "guest speaker".

The political ban on Ecevit was lifted following a referendum in 1987. Later that year, Rahşan Ecevit handed over the rule of the party to her spouse. But the party failed to pass the 10% national threshold needed for a political party to have a seat in Parliament in the 1987 elections, prompting the Ecevits to step down from their positions in the party.

In 1988, Necdet Karababa was elected as the new party leader. However, the next year, Ecevit was reelected as party chairman in the party convention. Two years later in 1991, the DSP received 10.75% of the votes in the elections allowing the party to have seven seats in the Parliament. This also meant the return of Ecevit to the Parliament after 11 years.

It was a minor party until it won 76 parliamentary seats in the December 1995 elections. Again in 1995, the party started to suffer from inner conflicts after years of serenity. The inner conflicts in the party ended with the dismissal of Erdal Kesebir, MP for Edirne and three other DSP members.

In 1997, the DSP became a partner of a three-way coalition government led by Mesut Yılmaz who at the time was the leader of the Motherland Party (Turkish: Anavatan Partisi). Ecevit became the deputy prime minister.

In 1998, the 55th government of Turkey was toppled by a censure motion. Ecevit received the mandate to form a new government. He founded a minority government of DSP in 1999 to carry the country to general elections.

=== 1999–2002 ===
Boosted by the capture of the leader of the PKK, Abdullah Öcalan, during his premiership, Ecevit and the DSP won 22,19% of the votes in the elections of April 1999 and took 136 of the 550 seats in the Turkish Parliament becoming the leading party in a coalition with ANAP and MHP. Its leader Bülent Ecevit became the Prime Minister of Turkey for the fifth time.

This government passed many important laws, including banking reform, unemployment insurance, a law to ensure the autonomy of the Central Bank, qualified industrial zones, tender law, employment incentive law, to name a few. The government also changed 34 articles of the Constitution to widen fundamental rights and freedoms, and did this with the approval of all the parties in parliament. Turkey became a candidate country to the European Union (without any political preconditions and with equal treatment as all other candidate countries). Three major EU harmonisation packages were passed during this government, including the most comprehensive package of 3 August 2002, which included the removal of the death penalty and many changes in fundamental rights and freedoms. An economic crisis which resulted from long overdue problems from previous governments caused a drop in the currency in February 2001. But two months later, the government passed a series of very comprehensive economic reforms which included changes to the tender law, economic social council law, unemployment insurance, the restructuring of state banks, accreditation law, law on capital markets, and a law on industrial zones which enabled the high growth of 2002–2007.

The party staunchly opposed the invasion of Iraq by the US. Ecevit himself was a vocal critic of the invasion, arguing that it would destabilize the region and cause harm to innocent civilians. Ecevit said he favors lifting some economic sanctions against Iraq, the first such statement by a Turkish leader since the sanctions were imposed following Iraqi invasion of Kuwait in 1990.

The DSP was weakened by internal divisions in 2001, when Deputy Prime Minister Hüsamettin Özkan and several other leading DSP politicians and MPs founded the New Turkey Party. The year after, its government coalition partner MHP called for early elections, which were held on 3 November 2002. None of the three coalition parties were able to pass the 10% national threshold in those elections.

=== 2002–present ===
Before the 6th Party Congress on 25 July 2004, Bülent Ecevit announced that he would step down as party leader and leave active politics. During the congress, Zeki Sezer, deputy chairman since 2001, was elected as the new chairman of the party.

DSP entered the 2007 elections together with the Republican People's Party (Turkish: Cumhuriyet Halk Partisi, CHP). The DSP-CHP alliance won 20.85% of the votes, with the DSP getting 13 seats in Parliament.

In 2008, together with many other politicians joining the DSP before the local elections of 2009, Mustafa Sarıgül, the Mayor of the Istanbul district of Şişli officially joined the party.

DSP got only 2.75% of votes in the local elections of 2009. Zeki Sezer resigned and Masum Türker succeeded him. After Türker's succession, both Mustafa Sarıgül, the deputy of Şişli, and Rahşan Ecevit, the widow of Bülent Ecevit, resigned from the party and created short lived Democratic Left People's Party. Democratic Left People's Party dissolved itself after six months. After 2011 general elections, DSP received a major decline in Turkish politics, getting less than 0.25% votes in subsequent elections in 2011 and 2015. In 2015, Önder Aksakal succeeded Türker as party leader. The party lost eligibility to contest in 2018 elections, and they supported Nation Alliance.

==== 2023 general election ====
In February 2023, Muharrem İnce, the leader of the Homeland Party announced that his party was discussing an electoral alliance with the Democratic Left Party, the Victory Party, True Party and the Justice Party for the 2023 Turkish general election. On 8 March 2023, the party announced that it would not support the candidacy of CHP's Kemal Kılıçdaroğlu for the 2023 Turkish presidential election. Furthermore, on 9 March 2023, a pro-Erdoğan journalist, Mahmut Övür claimed that DSP would join the People's Alliance.

On 7 April 2023, DSP decided to support Erdoğan in the 2023 presidential elections and run under the AKP lists in the parliamentary elections. The decision to support Erdoğan caused 74 former DSP ministers and deputies to split from DSP and support Kemal Kılıçdaroğlu.

== Leaders ==
- Rahşan Ecevit (1985–1987)
- Bülent Ecevit (1987–1988)
- Necdet Karababa (1988–1989)
- Bülent Ecevit (1989–2004)
- Zeki Sezer (2004–2009)
- Masum Türker (2009–2015)
- Önder Aksakal (2015–)

Rahşan Ecevit and Bülent Ecevit were honorary presidents of DSP.

== Notable members ==
Notable members and former members include:

- Rahşan Ecevit, Founder and Former Party Leader
- Bülent Ecevit, Party Leader and Prime Minister of Turkey
- Necdet Karababa, Former Party Leader
- Zeki Sezer, Former Party Leader
- Masum Türker, Former Party Leader
- Yılmaz Büyükerşen, Mayor of the City of Eskişehir
- Mustafa Sarıgül, Mayor of the Istanbul district of Şişli
- Seyit Torun, Mayor of the city of Ordu
- Saffet Başaran, interim Party Leader

== Political views ==
The term Demokratik Sol (Democratic Left) was created by Bülent Ecevit in his late CHP period with the left of center movement, as a mix of social democracy, social liberalism, democratic socialism, secularism and Kemalism. With this term, the party established a link between universal values of the left and national-cultural heritage which makes the ideology "domestic". In other words, contemporary social democracy is made compatible with the conditions of Turkey. With Democratic Left, Ecevit made up a new synthesis by articulating new dimensions such as democratic socialism and social democracy to the national independence movement or Kemalism. The symbol of the white dove (Ak Güvercin) was selected to symbolize the pacifism and social accordance.

Under Ecevit, DSP approved of the Turkish adhesion to the European Union, although it criticized the content of the European Union Customs Union. During the premiership of Ecevit in 1999, Turkey became a candidate for the EU. However, under its current leader Önder Aksakal, it has started to take a more critical approach towards the EU.

DSP is against the idea of a united Cyprus state.

== Election results ==
=== General elections ===
Election	Share	Seats	Leader
1986	8.5%	0 / 11	Rahşan Ecevit
1987	8.53%	0 / 450	Bülent Ecevit
1991	10.8%	7 / 450	Bülent Ecevit
1995	14.64%	76 / 550	Bülent Ecevit
1999	22.19%	136 / 550	Bülent Ecevit
2002	1.22%	0 / 550	Bülent Ecevit
2007	20.85%	13 / 550	Zeki Sezer
2011	0.25%	0 / 550	Masum Türker
2015 Jun	0.19%	0 / 550	Masum Türker
2015 Nov	0.07%	0 / 550	Masum Türker
2018	Not eligible to contest		
2023	0.61%	1 / 600	Önder Aksakal

A: By-elections
B: DSP formed an alliance with CHP in 2007 and the alliance got 20.85% of total vote.
C: DSP ran in the 2023 parliamentary election on AKP's list and won 1 seat

=== Local elections ===
Election	Share	Municipalities	Leader
1989	9.09%	37 municipalities	Bülent Ecevit
1994	8.93%	23 municipalities	Bülent Ecevit
1999	19.28%	189 municipalities	Bülent Ecevit
2004	2.18%	32 municipalities	Bülent Ecevit
2009	2.75%	12 municipalities	Zeki Sezer
2014	0.33%	5 municipalities	Masum Türker
2019	0.98%	3 municipalities	Önder Aksakal

== See also ==
- 2015 Democratic Left Party Extraordinary Convention
