= Government of Turkey =

Government of the Republic of Turkey
- Türkiye Cumhuriyeti Hükûmeti
- Formation: 29 October 1923; 103 years ago
- Founding document: Constitution of the Republic of Turkey
- Jurisdiction: Turkey
- Website: www.turkiye.gov.tr

Legislative branch
- Legislature: Parliament
- Meeting place: Grand National Assembly

Executive branch
- Leader: President
- Headquarters: Presidential Complex
- Main organ: President
- Departments: 17

Judicial branch
- Court: Supreme Court
- Seat: Ankara

The Government of Turkey (Turkish: Türkiye Cumhuriyeti Hükûmeti) is the national government of Turkey. It is governed as a unitary state under a presidential representative democracy and a constitutional republic within a pluriform multi-party system. The term government can mean either the collective set of institutions (the executive, legislative, and judicial branches) or specifically the Cabinet (the executive).

In its multi-party system era, the longest-governing and still governing party is the AK Party under former prime minister and now president, Recep Tayyip Erdoğan. He abolished the parliamentary system in favour of a presidential system with the controversial 2017 Turkish constitutional referendum.

However, as of 2026, there have been concerns from the European Union regarding the state of the Copenhagen criteria and democracy in Turkey, which ended up indefinitely pausing Turkey's EU membership talks. Freedom House has considered Turkey not free since at least 2017. The end of Turkey's EU membership talks contributed to the abolishment of the Ministry of the EU from the Turkish cabinet, along with cabinets that were abolished or reshuffled after the 2013 corruption scandal in Turkey.

== Formation ==
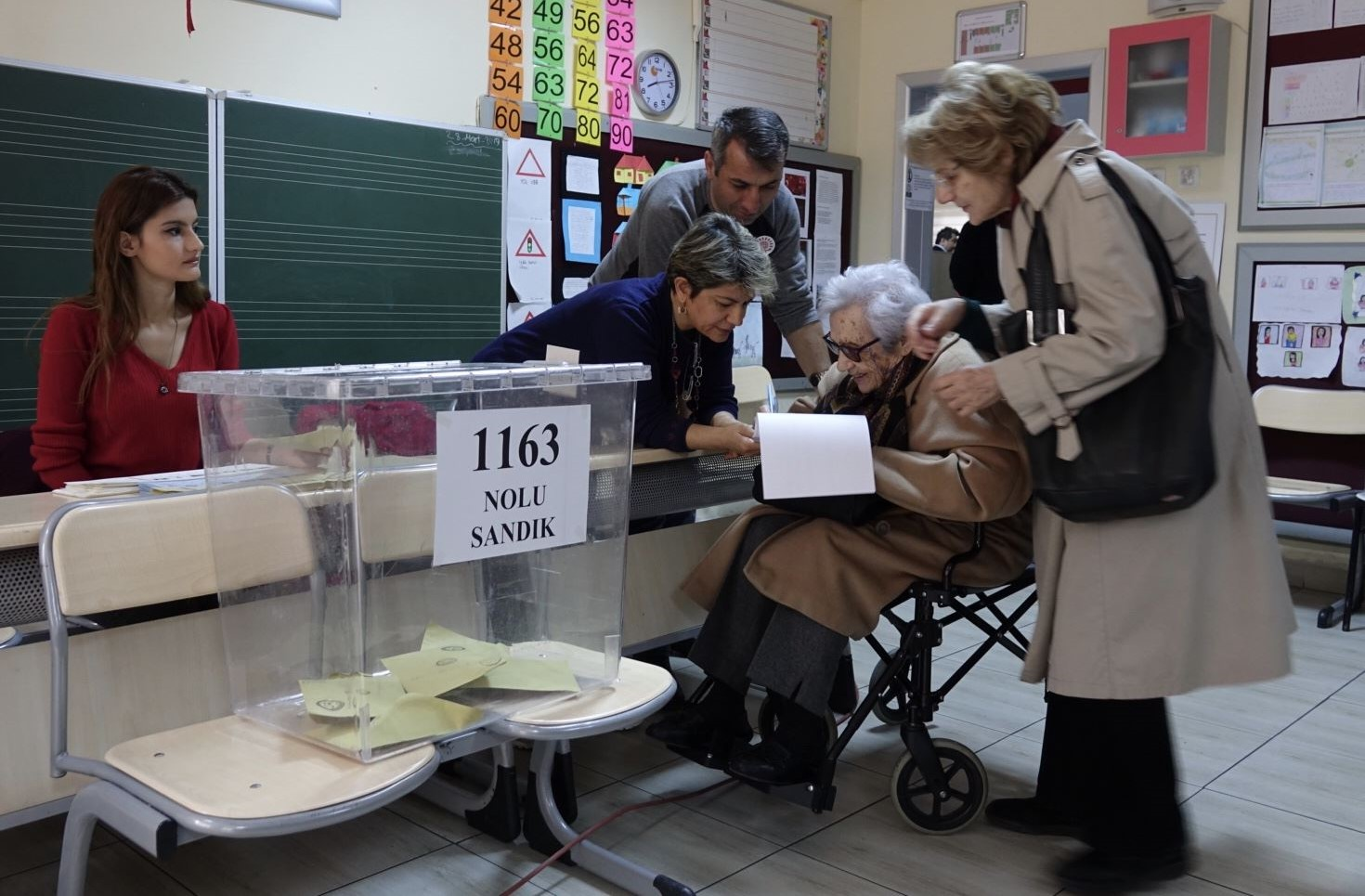
Citizens casting vote in 2019 Local elections in a public school.

The cabinet of the republic is appointed by the President of Turkey under the Turkish constitution. According to the Constitution, Turkey's government system is based on a separation of powers. The Constitution states that the legislative power is vested in the Grand National Assembly of Turkey (art. 7). The president can appeal to the Constitutional Court for the annulment of all or certain provisions of laws on the grounds that they are unconstitutional in form or in content (art. 104/7). In such a case, the decision of the Constitutional Court is final (art. 153). That the executive power is carried out by the President of Turkey (art. 8) and that the judicial power is exercised by independent and impartial courts (art. 9) It also states that parliamentary elections and presidential elections shall be held every five years (art. 77). The daily enforcement and administration of federal laws is in the hands of the various executive ministries, to deal with specific areas of national and international affairs. The Cabinet of Turkey includes the president and cabinet ministers. As part of the separation of the legislative branch from the executive branch, members of the cabinet cannot be a member of the parliament during their ministry.

In addition to ministries, a number of staff organizations are grouped into the Executive Office of the President. These include the National Security Council, the State Supervisory Council, the National Intelligence Organization, the Directorate of Communications, Disaster and Emergency Management Presidency and the Presidency of Strategy and Budget. There are also state-owned enterprises such as the Turkish Electricity Transmission Corporation. The government has to be formed after the elections.

- Presidential elections: A two-round system, with the top two candidates contesting a run-off election two weeks after the initial election, should no candidate win at least 50% +1 of the popular vote.
- Parliamentary elections: The D'Hondt method, a party-list proportional representation system, to elect 600 Members of Parliament to the Grand National Assembly from 87 electoral districts that elect different numbers of MPs depending on their populations.
- Local elections: Metropolitan and District Mayors, Municipal and Provincial Councillors, neighbourhood presidents and their village councils elected through a first-past-the-post system, with the winning candidate in each municipality elected by a simple majority.

=== Role and Powers of the Government ===
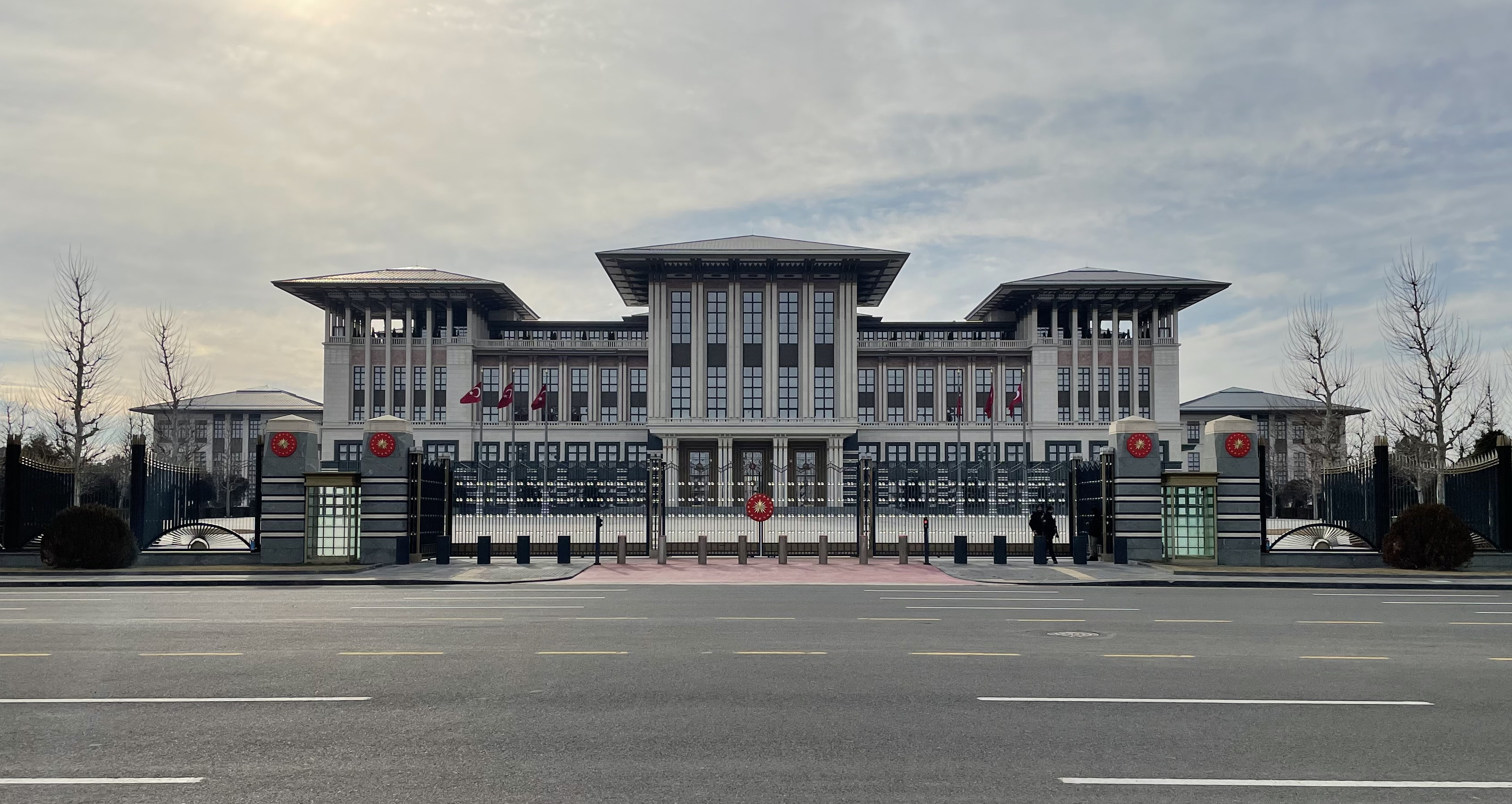
The Presidential Külliye

- The president may sign legislation passed by the Parliament into law or may veto it, preventing it from becoming law unless a simple majority in the Parliament vote to override the veto.
- On the approval of the President, laws are published in the Official Gazette and they come into force by virtue of that publication unless a specific effective date is stipulated within the law itself.
- The budget document often begins with the president's proposal to Parliament recommending funding levels for the next fiscal year, beginning January 1 and ending on December 31 of the year following.
- Most of the taxes are levied by the central government.
- President is the Head of State and Head of the Government
- The president, according to the Constitution, must "ensure the implementation of the Constitution", and "ensure orderly and harmonious functioning of the organs of the State".
- The daily enforcement and administration of federal laws is in the hands of the various executive ministries, to deal with specific areas of national and international affairs. The Cabinet of Turkey includes the president and cabinet ministers. As part of the separation of the legislative branch from the executive branch, members of the cabinet cannot be a member of the parliament during their ministry.

== Branches separated from the Cabinet ==
=== Legislative branch ===
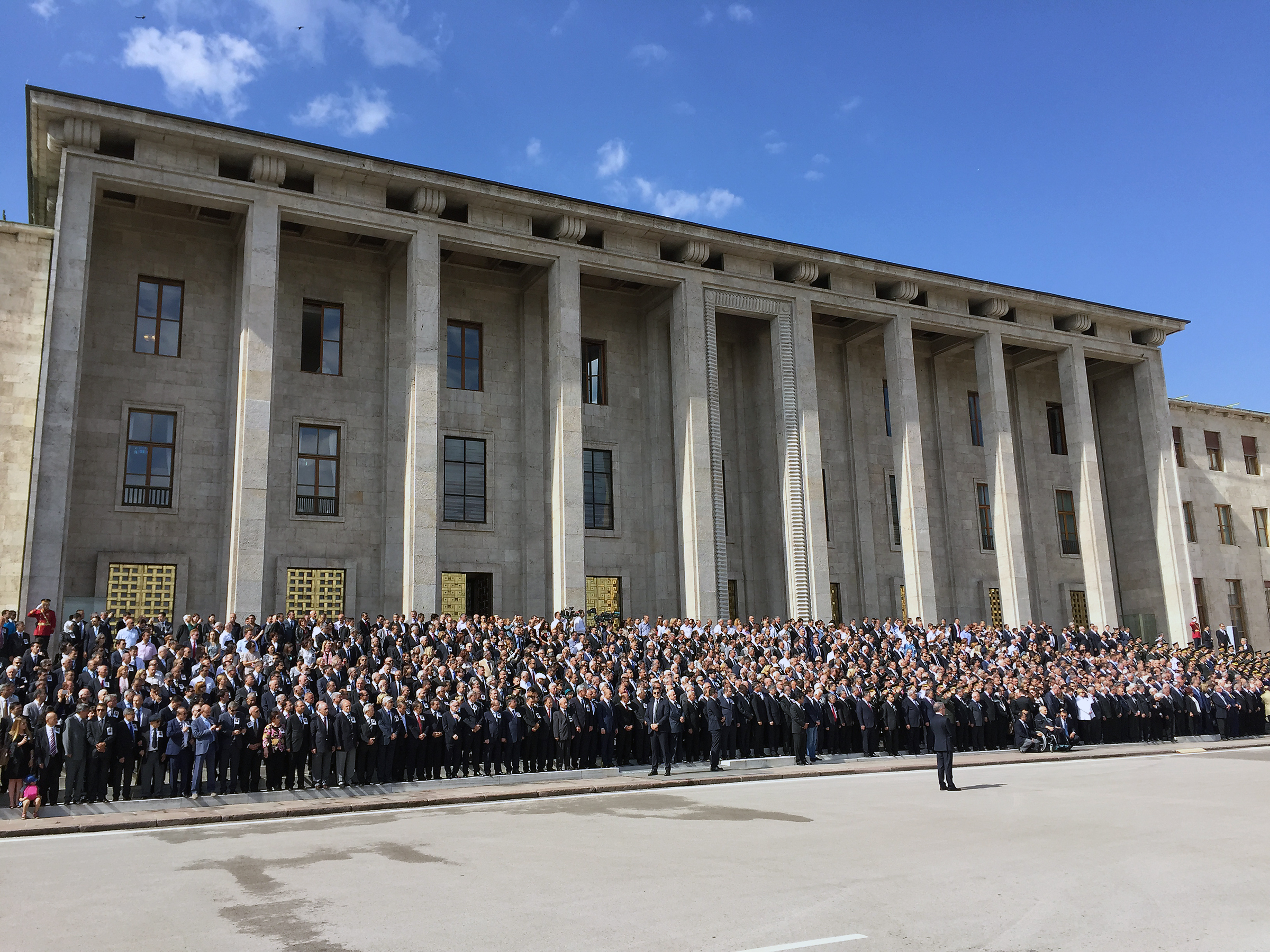
Parliament of Turkey

Legislative power is vested in a single-chamber parliament (the Grand National Assembly of Turkey) with 600 members. The members are elected for a period of five years according to the D'Hondt method. Every citizen over the age of eighteen is eligible to be a deputy. Members of the Grand National Assembly can not hold office in state departments and other public corporate bodies and their subsidiaries.

Members of parliament are able to sit on behalf of a political party or as an independent parliamentarian. They are also delegates for the province in which they are elected. A simple majority is required to amend a law and a three-fifths majority to amend the constitution. Bills can be introduced by any member of parliament.

The duties and powers of the Grand National Assembly of Turkey are to enact, amend, and repeal laws; to debate and adopt the budget bills and final accounts bills; to decide to declare war; to approve the ratification of international treaties, to decide with the majority of three-fifths of the Grand National Assembly of Turkey to proclaim amnesty and pardon; and to exercise the powers and carry out the duties envisaged in the other articles of the Constitution.

=== Judicial branch ===
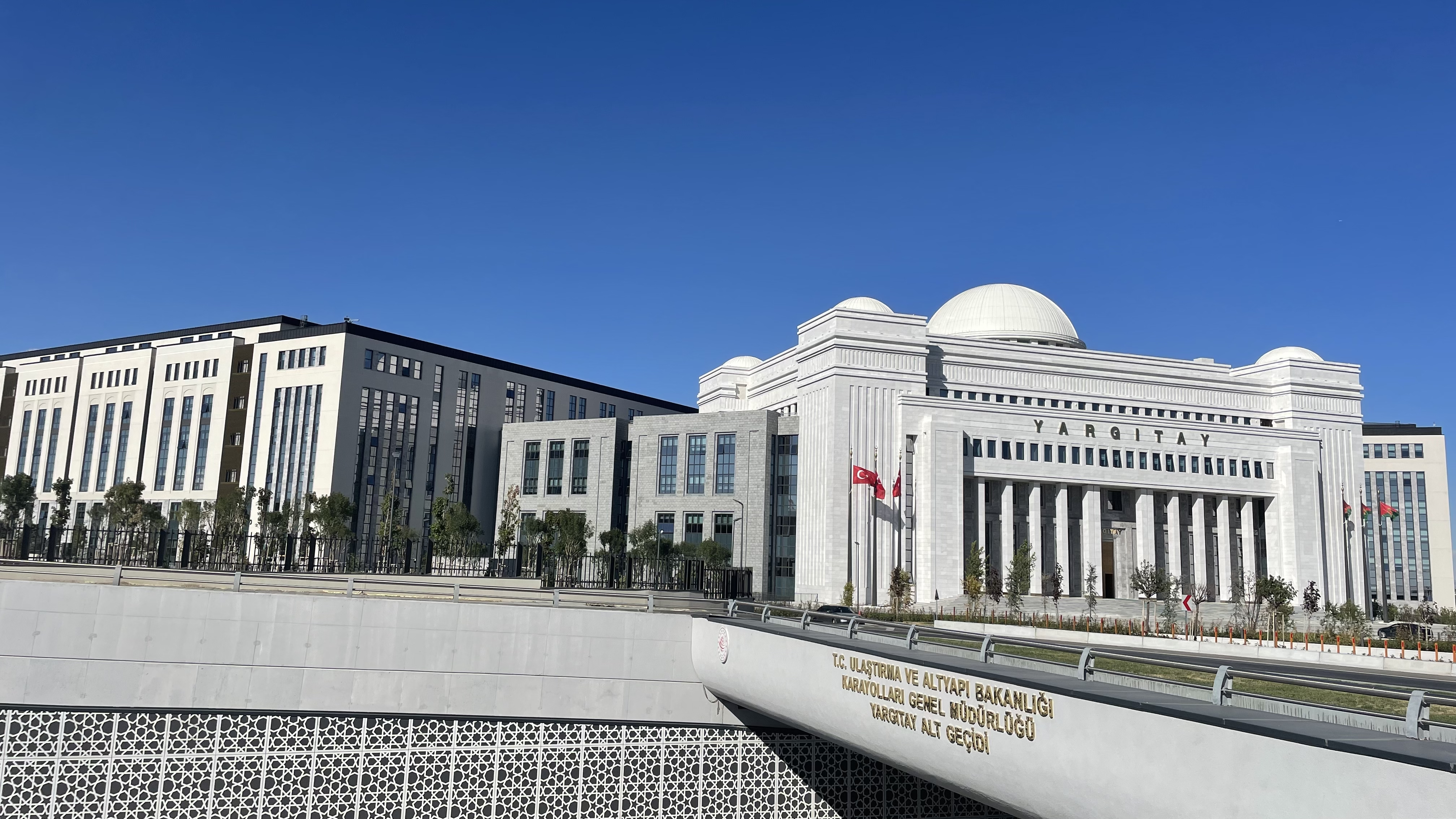
Court of Cassation in Ankara, Turkey.

The Constitutional Court, the Court of Cassation, the Council of State, and the Court of Jurisdictional Disputes are the supreme courts mentioned in the judicial section of the Constitution. The courts operate within the framework of civil law.

The Constitutional Court checks whether laws are in accordance with the constitution. Since 2005, the legal principles as laid down in the various international human rights treaties have also been assessed. Government institutions, governing parties, and the opposition have direct access to the Court. Citizens can also plead the alleged unconstitutionality of a particular law in an ongoing lawsuit.

International treaties, on ratification by the Parliament, have hierarchically the same effect as codes and statutes. However, international treaty provisions involving basic rights and freedoms prevail against domestic codes and statutes.

There are also specialised courts for certain legal areas within the scope of the powers of civil courts such as cadastral courts, commercial courts, consumer courts, intellectual and industrial property courts, and labour courts. In certain disputes, some quasi-legal authorities must be used before applying to court such as the Sports Arbitration Committee and the Turkish Football Federation Arbitration Committee.

== Local administration ==
The Constitution enumerates local governments as municipalities, special provincial administrations and villages. The administration of the provinces is based on the principle of devolution of powers. The regulatory and budgetary autonomy of local governments is secured in the Constitution.

A governor is representing the government in the province and is also the figurehead and executive organ of the special provincial administration. Governors act as the chairman of the provincial executive committee.

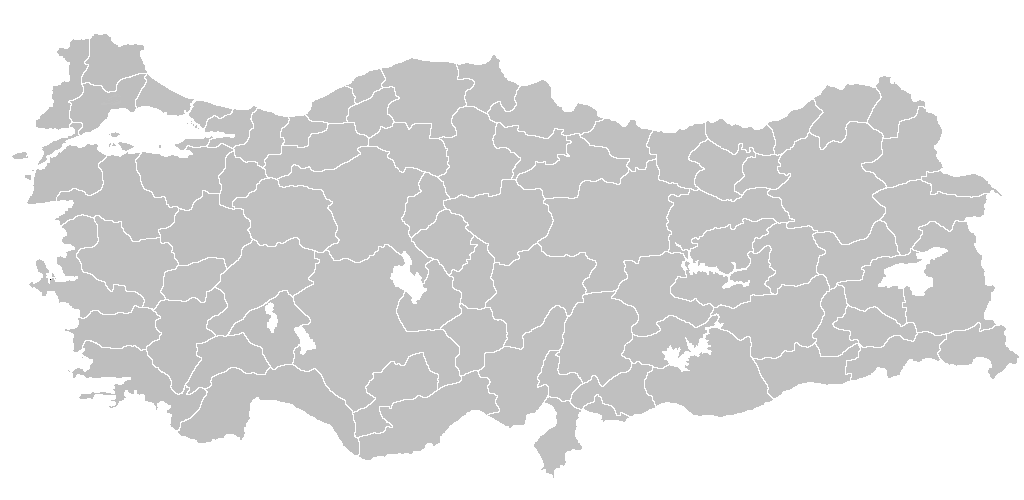

== See also ==
- Politics of Turkey
- Cabinet of Turkey
- Constitution of Turkey
- Judicial system of Turkey
- Turkish Space Agency
- Legislation of Turkey
