= Politics of Turkey =

Politics of Turkey Türkiye'de siyaset
- Polity type: Unitary presidential constitutional republic
- Constitution: Constitution of Turkey

Legislative branch
- Name: Legislation of Turkey or Grand National Assembly
- Type: Unicameral
- Meeting place: Parliament Building
- Presiding officer: Numan Kurtulmuş, Speaker of the Grand National Assembly

Executive branch
- Head of state and government
- Title: President (Turkish: Cumhurbaşkanı)
- Currently: Recep Tayyip Erdoğan
- Appointer: Direct popular vote
- Cabinet
- Name: Presidential Cabinet
- Current cabinet: Cabinet Erdoğan V
- Leader: President
- Deputy leader: Vice President
- Appointer: President
- Headquarters: Presidential Complex
- Ministries: 17

Judicial branch
- Name: Judicial system
- Constitutional Court
- Chief judge: Kadir Özkaya
- Council of State
- Chief judge: Zeki Yiğit
- Court of Cassation
- Chief judge: Ömer Kerkez
- Court of Jurisdictional Disputes
- Chief judge: Rıdvan Güleç

The politics of Turkey take place in the framework of a constitutional republic and presidential system, with various levels and branches of power.

Turkey's political system is based on a separation of powers. Executive power is exercised by the Council of Ministers, which is appointed and headed by the President, who serves as country's head of state and head of government. Legislative power is vested in the Grand National Assembly. The judiciary is independent of the executive and the legislature. Its current constitution was adopted on 7 November 1982 after a constitutional referendum.

Major constitutional revisions were passed by the National Assembly on 21 January 2017 and approved by referendum on 16 April 2017. The reforms, among other measures, abolished the position of Prime Minister and designated the President as both head of state and government, effectively transforming Turkey from a parliamentary regime into a presidential one.

Suffrage is universal for citizens 18 years of age and older.

== National government ==
Turkey is a presidential representative democracy and a constitutional republic within a pluriform multi-party system, in which the president (the head of state and head of government), parliament, and judiciary share powers reserved to the national government.

The government is divided into three branches, as per the specific terms articulated in part three of the Turkish Constitution:

- Legislative: The unicameral Parliament makes law, debates and adopts the budget bills, declares war, approves treaties, proclaims amnesty and pardon, and has the power of impeachment, by which it can remove sitting members of the government.
- Executive: The president is the commander-in-chief of the military, can veto legislative bills before they become law (subject to parliamentary override), can issue presidential decrees on matters regarding executive power with exception of fundamental rights, individual rights and certain political rights (parliamentary laws prevail presidential decrees), and appoints the members of the Cabinet and other officers, who administer and enforce national laws and policies.
- Judicial: The Constitutional Court (for constitutional adjudication and review of individual applications concerning human rights), the Court of Cassation (final decision maker in ordinary judiciary), the Council of State (final decision maker in administrative judiciary) and the Court of Jurisdictional Disputes (for resolving the disputes between courts for constitutional jurisdiction) are the four organizations that are described by the Constitution as supreme courts. The judges of the Constitutional Court are appointed by the president and the parliament.

Legislative power is invested in the 600-seat Grand National Assembly of Turkey (Türkiye Büyük Millet Meclisi), representing 81 provinces. The members are elected for a five-year term by mitigated proportional representation with an election threshold of 7%. To be represented in Parliament, a party must win at least 7% of the national vote in a national parliamentary election. Independent candidates may run, and to be elected, they must only win enough to get one seat.

The freedom and independence of the judicial system is protected within the constitution. There is no organization, person, or institution which can interfere in the running of the courts, and the executive and legislative structures must obey the courts' decisions. The courts, which are independent in discharging their duties, must explain each ruling on the basis of the provisions of the Constitution, the laws, jurisprudence, and their personal convictions.

The Judicial system is highly structured. Turkish courts have no jury system; judges render decisions after establishing the facts in each case based on evidence presented by lawyers and prosecutors. For minor civil complaints and offenses, justices of the peace take the case. This court has a single judge. It has jurisdiction over misdemeanors and petty crimes, with penalties ranging from small fines to brief prison sentences. Three-judge courts of first instance have jurisdiction over major civil suits and serious crimes. Any conviction in a criminal case can be taken to a court of Appeals for judicial review.

== Administrative divisions ==
The political system of Turkey is highly centralized. However, as a member state of the Council of Europe, Turkey is under an obligation to implement the European Charter of Local Self-Government. In its 2011 report, the Monitoring Committee of the Council of Europe found fundamental deficits in implementation, in particular administrative tutelage and prohibition of the use of languages other than Turkish in the provision of public services.

== Political principles of importance in Turkey ==
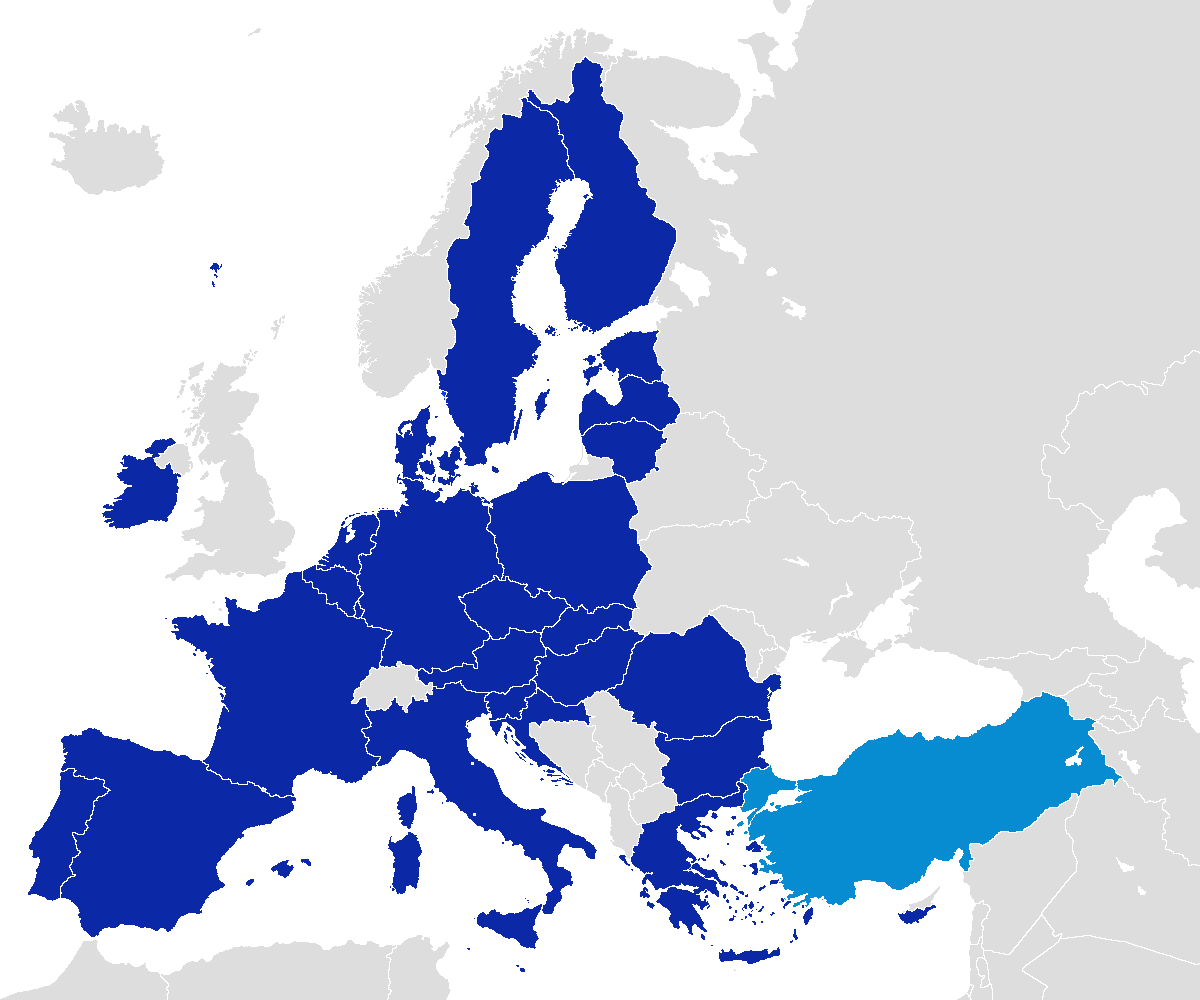
After becoming one of the early members of the Council of Europe in 1950, Turkey became an associate member of the EEC in 1963, joined the EU Customs Union in 1995 and started full membership negotiations with the European Union in 2005.

The Turkish Constitution is cumulatively built on the following principles:

- Kemalism (The Six Arrows)
  - Republicanism
  - Populism
  - Nationalism
  - Laicism
  - Statism
  - Reformism
- Modernization
- Westernization

Most mainstream political parties are alternatively built either on the following principles:

- Nationalism
  - Turkish nationalism
  - Kurdish nationalism
- Conservatism
- Kemalism
- Decentralization

Other political ideas have also influenced Turkish politics and modern history. Of particular importance are:

- Neoliberalism
- Pan-Turkism
- Socialism
- Communism
- Erdoğanism

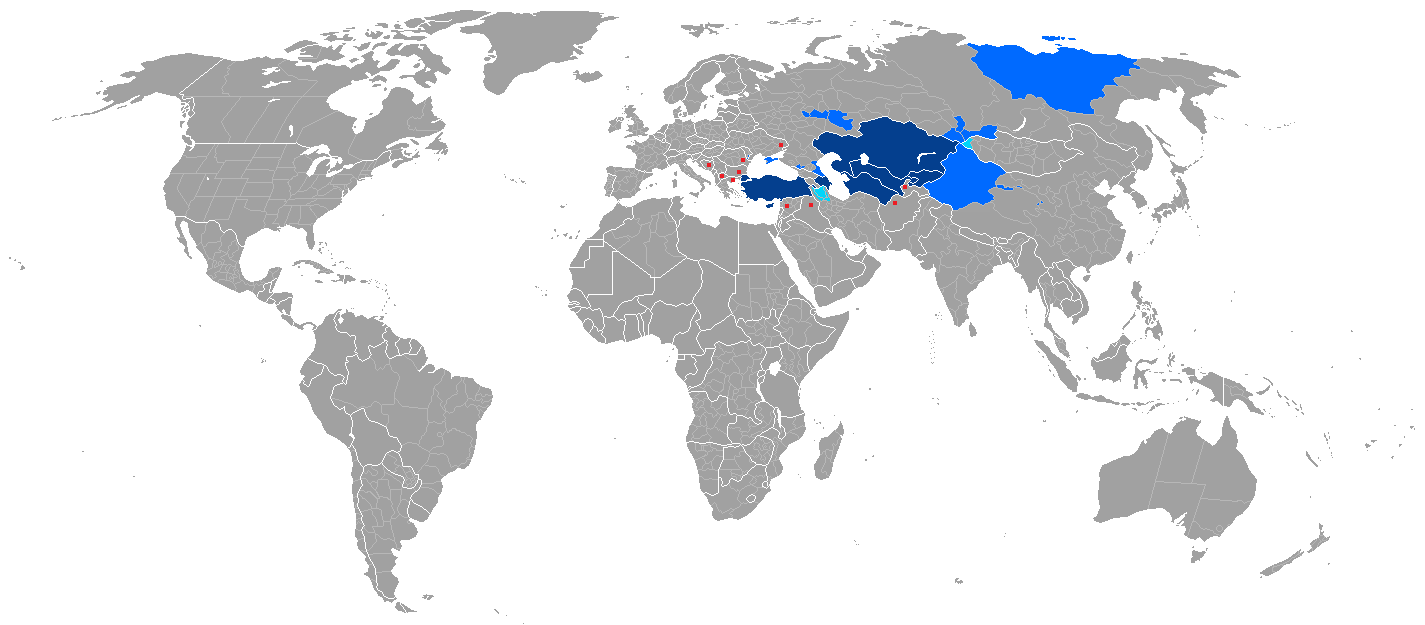
Countries and regions where a Turkic language has official status

These principles are the continuum around which various – and often rapidly changing – political parties and groups have campaigned (and sometimes fought). On a superficial level, the importance which state officials attach to these principles and their posts can be seen in their response to breaches of protocol in official ceremonies.

== Political parties and elections ==
=== Political parties ===
After World War II, Turkey started operating under a multi-party system.

On the center right to right side of the Turkish political spectrum, these parties have had large majorities:

- Democrat Party (DP) (Formed in 1945, shut down after the 1960 coup d'état)
- Justice Party (AP) (Formed in 1961, shut down after the 1980 coup d'état)
- Motherland Party (ANAP) (Formed in 1983, stayed in power until 1991, was a sizeable party that sometimes was part of governing coalitions until 2002)
- Justice and Development Party (AK PARTY) (Formed in 2001, has been in power since 2002)

Some other parties that have had similar politics but never had large majorities are:

- Democratic Party (DP)
- Republican Reliance Party (CGP)
- Nationalist Democracy Party (MDP)
- True Path Party (DYP)
- Good Party (İYİ PARTY)

Turkish right-wing parties are more likely to embrace principles of political ideologies such as conservatism, nationalism or Islamism.

On the far-right, there have been nationalist parties and Islamist parties:

- Idealist parties
  - Nationalist Movement Party (MHP)
  - Nationalist Task Party (MÇP)
  - Great Unity Party (BBP)
  - Bright Turkey Party (ATP)
  - National Path Party (MİLLİ YOL)
- Milli Görüş parties
  - National Order Party (MNP)
  - National Salvation Party (MSP)
  - Welfare Party (RP)
  - Virtue Party (FP)
  - Felicity Party (SP)
  - New Welfare Party (YRP)
- Victory Party (ZP)

On the center-left to left side of the spectrum, the following parties once enjoyed the largest electoral success, and are more likely to embrace principles of social democracy, Kemalism or secularism:

- Republican People's Party (CHP)
- Peoples' Equality and Democracy Party (DEM Party)
- Social Democratic Populist Party (SHP)
- Democratic Left Party (DSP)

On the far-left side, socialist and communist parties tend not to get large votes, but parties like the Workers' Party of Turkey (and the party with the same name founded in 2017) have been able to get elected representatives in the parliament.

=== Elections ===
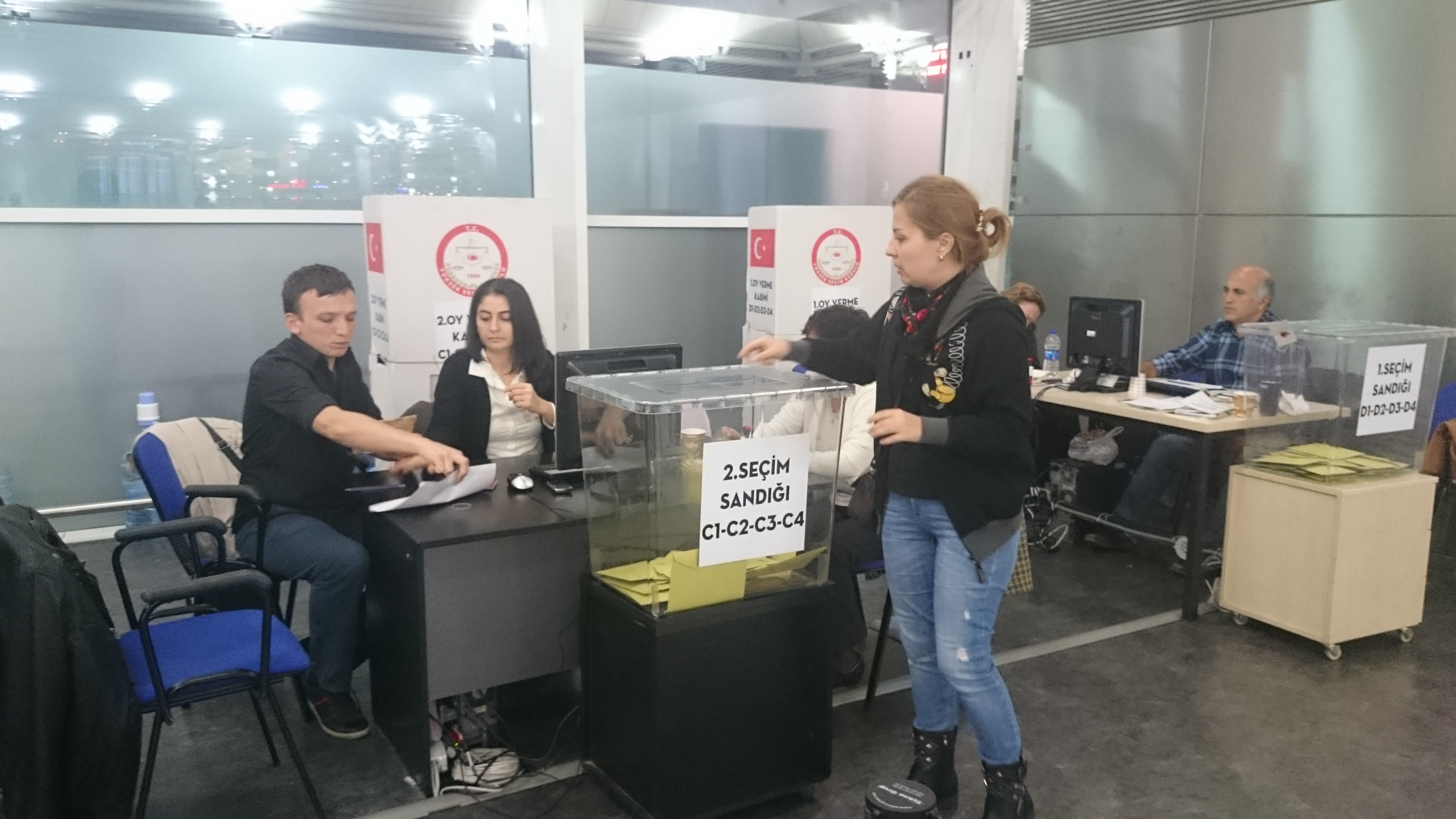
A woman casting her vote at the 2015 elections

Elections in Turkey are held for six functions of government: presidential elections (national), parliamentary elections (national), municipality mayors (local), district mayors (local), provincial or municipal council members (local) and muhtars (local).

Apart from elections, referendums are also held occasionally. To put forward a referendum regarding constitutional amendments, a supermajority (three fifths of the votes) in the parliament is required first. These kinds of referendums are binding.

In May 2023, President Erdogan won a new re-election and his AK Party with its allies held parliamentary majority in the general election.

== Suffrage ==
Every Turkish citizen who has turned 18 has the right to vote and stand as a candidate at elections. Universal suffrage for both sexes has been applied throughout Turkey since 1934.

According to the Constitution of the Ottoman Empire (1876), the age of candidacy was 30 and the voting age was 25. In the newly established Republic of Turkey, the voting age was reduced to 18 due to the decreasing population, and the age of candidacy was still 30. The voting age was increased to 22 in 1934, decreased to 21 in 1987, and 18 in 1995.

The age of candidacy dropped from 30 to 25 through a constitutional amendment in 2006. Following the 2017 constitutional referendum, it was further lowered to 18.

== Financing ==
Political parties can use donations, dues, real estate income and income from party activities to continue their activities. Since 1965, the Treasury also gives money to political parties. According to the law, parties that participated in the last parliamentary elections and that passed the general threshold are paid 0.04% of the general budget revenues each year. Apart from this, the parties that received more than 3 percent of the votes despite being below the threshold are also given public funding in proportion of support. This amount triples in election years.

Political parties can't receive aid or donations in kind or in cash from foreign states, international organizations and entities not of Turkish nationality. The same rule applies for candidates in presidential elections. Anonymous donations to political parties are also not allowed. It should be clearly stated in the receipt given by the party that the donation belong to the donor or the donor's authorized representative or attorney. Donations by political parties cannot be accepted without relying on such a document. Donations from domestic corporations with (partial) government ownership are also not allowed.

According to article 74 of the Political Parties Law, the financial control of political parties is carried out by the Constitutional Court. The Constitutional Court supervises the compliance of the property acquisitions, income and expenses of political parties with the Law. Presidents of political parties are obliged to submit a certified copy of the final account and the final accounts of the local organizations, including the party headquarters and its affiliated districts, to the Constitutional Court and to the Office of the Chief Public Prosecutor of the Supreme Court for information, until the end of June.

== Military involvement in politics ==
Since Mustafa Kemal Atatürk founded the modern secular Republic of Turkey in 1923, the Turkish military has perceived itself as the guardian of Kemalism, the official state ideology. The TAF still maintains an important degree of influence over Turkish politics and the decision-making process regarding issues related to Turkish national security, albeit decreased in the past decades, via the National Security Council.

The military has had a record of intervening in politics. Indeed, it assumed power for several periods in the latter half of the 20th century. It executed coups d'état in 1960, in 1971, and in 1980. In 1997, it maneuvered the removal of an Islamic-oriented prime minister, Necmettin Erbakan. The military continued to effect politics throughout the first two decades of the 21st century, publishing an e-memorandum in 2007, and attempting a coup in 2016.

On 27 April 2007, in advance of 4 November 2007 presidential election, and in reaction to the politics of Abdullah Gül, who has a past record of involvement in Islamist political movements and banned Islamist parties such as the Welfare Party, the army issued a statement of its interests. It said that the army is a party to "arguments" regarding secularism; that Islamism ran counter to the secular nature of the Turkish Republic, and to the legacy of Mustafa Kemal Atatürk. The Army's statement ended with a clear warning that the Turkish Armed Forces stood ready to intervene if the secular nature of the Turkish Constitution is compromised, stating that "the Turkish Armed Forces maintain their sound determination to carry out their duties stemming from laws to protect the unchangeable characteristics of the Republic of Turkey. Their loyalty to this determination is absolute."

The Turkish populace is not uniformly averse to coups; many welcome the ejection of governments they perceive as unconstitutional. Members of the military must also comply with the traditions of secularism, according to the US Commission on International Religious Freedom report in 2008, members who performed prayers or had wives who wore the headscarf, have been charged with "lack of discipline".

Paradoxically, the military has both been an important force in Turkey's continuous Westernization but at the same time also represents an obstacle for Turkey's desire to join the EU. At the same time, the military enjoys a high degree of popular legitimacy, with continuous opinion polls suggesting that the military is the state institution that the Turkish people trust the most.

On 15 July 2016, factions within the Turkish Military attempted to overthrow President Recep Tayyip Erdoğan, citing growing non-secularism and censorship as motivation for the attempted coup. The coup was blamed on the influence of the vast network led by U.S.-based Muslim cleric Fethullah Gülen. In the aftermath of the failed coup, major purges have occurred, including that of military officials, police officers, judges, governors and civil servants. There has also been significant media purge in the aftermath of the failed coup. There has been allegations of torture in connection with these purges.

== Ombudsman ==
In 2012 the position of ombudsman was created, due to the ratification of the 2010 referendum. The ombudsman is charged with solving, without the need to a recourse before the courts, the disagreements between citizens and the administrations and other entities charged with a mission of a public service proposing reforms to the Government and the administrations to further these goals; and actively participating in the international promotion of human rights. The institution is independent of the government and answers to the Parliament alone. The ombudsman is elected for a period of 4 years by the Parliament.

== Foreign relations ==
Throughout the Cold War, Turkey's most important ally has been the United States, which shared Turkey's interest in containing Soviet expansion. In support of the United States, Turkey contributed personnel to the UN forces in the Korean War (1950–1953), joined NATO in 1952, recognized Israel in 1948 and has cooperated closely with it.

== Opinion polls ==
A 2025 Turkish Statistical Institute opinion poll found the most common political issues in Turkey were cost of living, poverty and education.

== See also ==
- Human rights in Turkey
- Category:Political prisoners in Turkey
- Censorship in Turkey
- Constitution of Turkey
- Democratic backsliding in Turkey
- Cabinet of Turkey
- Coalition governments in Turkey
- Government of Turkey
- Turkish order of precedence
- Women in Turkish politics
- National Security Council (Turkey)
- Conspiracy theories in Turkey
- Legislation of Turkey
