= Legislation of Turkey =

Legislative System in Turkey

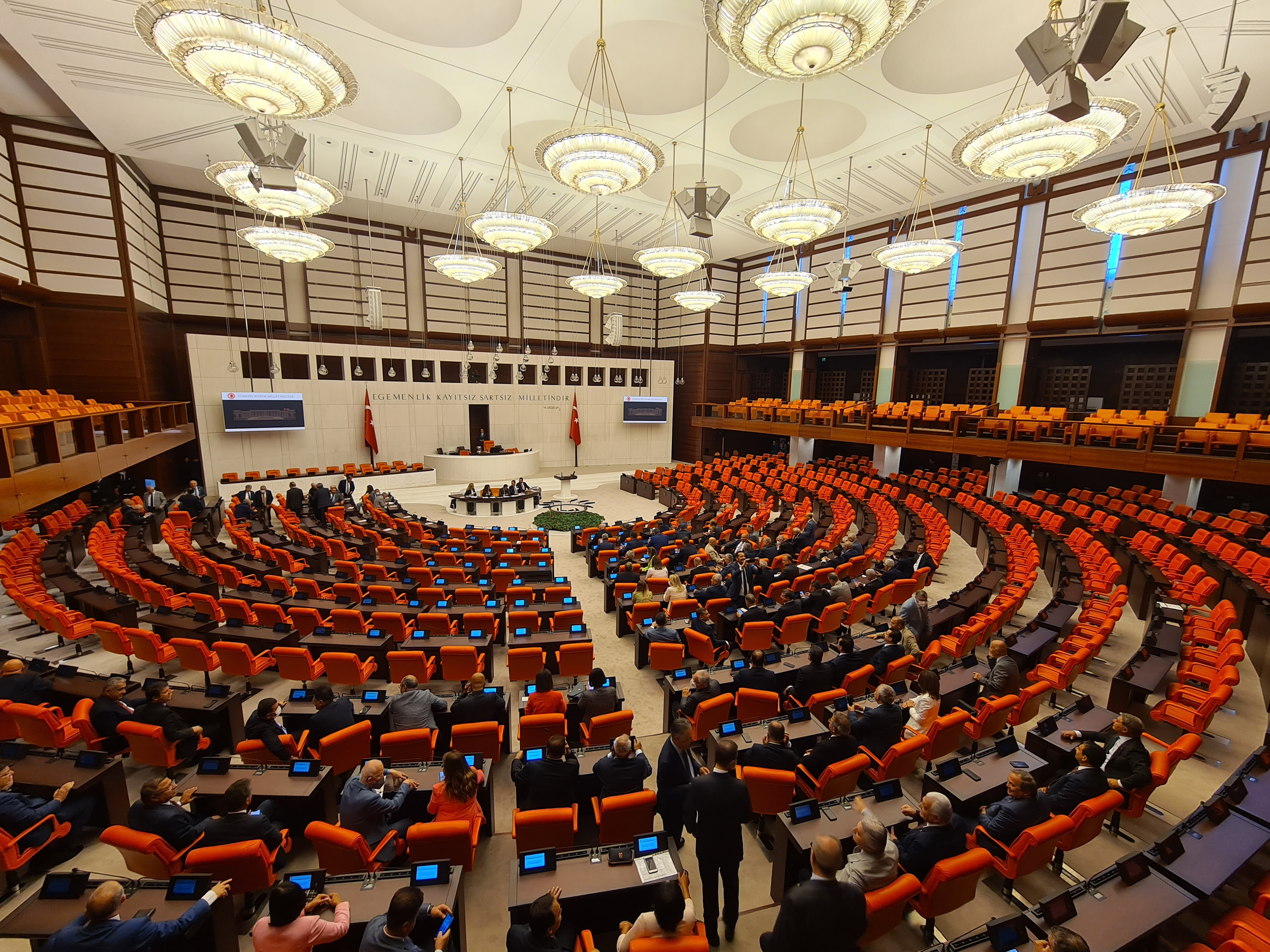
TBMM, August 2022

The Constitution of Turkey grants sole legislative authority to the Grand National Assembly of Turkey, which is responsible for making, amending, and repealing laws. The Constitution of Turkey stands as the supreme legal framework of the republic, Legislative duties are exercised independently from the Judicial system of Turkey, maintaining the separation of powers within the state.

Historically, the head of government was the Prime Minister of Turkey, who led the executive branch alongside the President. However, following the controversial 2017 Turkish constitutional referendum, Turkey transitioned from a semi-parliamentary system to a presidential system. This reform abolished the office of Prime Minister and transferred executive powers to the President of Turkey, who now serves as both the Head of State and the Head of Government.

The Grand National Assembly of Turkey remains the sole legislative body in the country.

== Responsibilities of legislative bodies ==
The legislative bodies of Turkey and the bodies that uphold them have a set of responsibilities. The main responsibilities of the assembly are deciding on the annual budget, making decisions on laws and rules, and working with other bodies, like the executive branch. The Assembly is also supposed to be fair and work together with the opposition.

The President of Turkey is the head of the executive branch and can veto and redirect the Grand National Assembly of Turkey's verdicts. As the leader of their party, they can hold both legislative and executive powers at the same time. The president is expected to be independent, transparent and fair. Formerly belonged to the Prime Minister of Turkey until the power transfer.

== Legislation in Judiciary and Executive ==
Turkey's legislation adapts the rules of Secular values and Social Democracy when it comes to judicial and executive decisions. The Constitution of Turkey separates religion from powers and separates the state powers within bodies and institutions,the government, in theory, operates under democratic and constitutional principles.

=== Judiciary ===
The Judiciary of Turkey follows the Constitution of Turkey, and its job is to implement and oversee the legislative decisions after the Grand National Assembly of Turkey enacts them. The judicial system, in theory, functions independently and is responsible for reviewing laws, protecting constitutional rights. In principle, the judicial system functions independently from the legislative and executive branches. Institutions that uphold these judicial functions include:

- Constitutional Court of Turkey,
- Court of Cassation (Turkey)
- Council of State (Turkey)
- Court of Accounts (Turkey)

=== Executive ===
The Executive of Turkey operates under the framework of the Constitution of Turkey and is responsible for enforcing laws passed by the Grand National Assembly of Turkey. The executive branch carries out state administration. It implements legislative decisions, coordinates public institutions, and manages both domestic governance and international relations.

== Legislative Terms ==
Turkey holds Legislative terms and Elections.

| Elections | Date | Number of Members |
|---|---|---|
| 1946 General Elections | August 5, 1946 - March 24, 1950 | 503 |
| 1950 General Elections | May 22, 1950 - March 12, 1954 | 492 |
| 1954 General Elections | May 14, 1954 - September 11, 1957 | 537 |
| 1957 General Elections | November 1, 1957 - May 25, 1960 | 602 |
| 1960 Turkish coup d'état | Turkish Armed Forces | 30 |
| Constituent Assembly (National Unity Committee - Representatives Assembly) | January 6, 1961 - October 25, 1961 | |
| 1961 General Elections | October 25, 1961 - October 10, 1965 | 450 |
| 1965 General Elections | October 22, 1965 - October 12, 1969 | 450 |
| 1969 General Elections | October 22, 1969 - October 14, 1973 | 450 |
| 1973 General Elections | October 24, 1973 - June 5, 1977 | 450 |
| 1977 General Elections | June 13, 1977 - September 12, 1980 | 450 |
| 1980 Turkish coup d'état | National Security Council (Turkey, 1980) | September 12, 1980 - December 6, 1983 |
| Constituent Assembly (National Security Council) | October 23, 1981 - December 6, 1983 | |
| 1983 General Elections | November 24, 1983 - October 16, 1987 | 400 |
| 1987 General Elections | December 14, 1987 - September 1, 1991 | 450 |
| 1991 General Elections | November 14, 1991 - December 4, 1995 | 450 |
| 1995 General Elections | January 8, 1996 - March 25, 1999 | 550 |
| 1999 General Elections | May 2, 1999 - October 1, 2002 | 550 |
| 2002 General Elections | November 14, 2002 - June 3, 2007 | 550 |
| 2007 General Elections | July 23, 2007 - April 23, 2011 | 550 |
| 2011 General Elections | June 28, 2011 - April 23, 2015 | 550 |
| June 2015 General Elections | June 23, 2015 - October 1, 2015 | 550 |
| November 2015 General Elections | November 17, 2015 - May 16, 2018 | 550 |
| 2018 General Elections | July 7, 2018 - April 7, 2023 | 600 |
| 2023 General Elections | June 2, 2023 - Present | 600 |

^{*}Since 1961, the numbering has started from 1 (e.g., the 12th term is now referred to as the 1st term, the 13th term as the 2nd term, etc.), and after 1983, the numbering reverted back to the original sequence from the founding of the Assembly (1920).

From October 15, 1961 to September 12, 1980, the Parliament operated as a bicameral body consisting of the Grand National Assembly of Turkey (GNAT) and the Republic Senate.

Republic Senate
| Group | Election | Date |
| Group A | 1961 Senate Elections | October 15, 1961 - June 2, 1968 |
| Group A | 1968 Senate Elections | June 2, 1968 - June 5, 1977 |
| Group A | 1977 Senate Elections | June 5, 1977 - September 12, 1980 |
| Group B | 1961 Senate Elections | October 15, 1961 - June 2, 1966 |
| Group B | 1966 Senate Elections | June 5, 1966 - October 12, 1975 |
| Group B | 1975 Senate Elections | October 12, 1975 - September 12, 1980 |
| Group C | 1961 Senate Elections | October 15, 1961 - June 7, 1964 |
| Group C | 1964 Senate Elections | June 7, 1964 - October 14, 1973 |
| Group C | 1973 Senate Elections | October 14, 1973 - October 14, 1979 |
| Group C | 1979 Senate Elections | October 14, 1979 - September 12, 1980 |

== See also ==
- Executive of Turkey
- Judiciary of Turkey
- Constitution of Turkey
- Grand National Assembly of Turkey
- Politics of Turkey
