= Executive of Turkey =

Executive power in Turkey

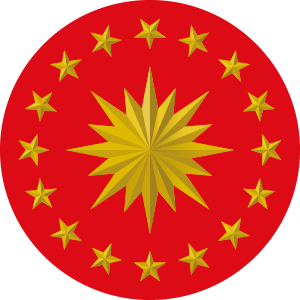
Emblem of the President of Turkey

The executive power in Turkey is exercised by the Cabinet of Turkey, which is responsible for implementing government policies and administering the affairs of the state. Traditionally, this authority was vested in the Prime Minister of Turkey, who served as the head of government and chaired the Cabinet, while the President of Turkey held a largely ceremonial role as the head of state. However, following the 2017 Turkish referendum, Turkey underwent a significant constitutional transformation that replaced the parliamentary system with a presidential one. As a result, the office of the Prime Minister was abolished, and its executive powers were transferred to the President of Turkey, who now serves simultaneously as both the Head of government and the Head of the state.

Constitution of Turkey adapts separation of powers between Judiciary of Turkey, Legislation of Turkey and The Executive of Turkey

== Executive Powers in Practice ==
In theory, the executive branch should be separated from the legislative and judicial powers, in accordance with the principle of the separation of powers. However, in practice, the President of Turkey may also serve as the leader of their political party and, through this position, maintain significant influence over the Grand National Assembly of Turkey, which exercises legislative authority. This situation can lead to a concentration of power within the executive branch and blur the distinction between the executive and legislative functions of the government.

President of Turkey regularly holds executive and legislative powers with being the head of their political party who has majority in parliament, regardless of the constitution. Which contributes to Democratic backsliding in Turkey.

== See also ==
- Legislation of Turkey
- Judiciary of Turkey
- Constitution of Turkey
- Grand National Assembly of Turkey
