= Turkish Constitutional Reform (2017) =

2017 amendments to the Turkish constitution

The Turkish Constitutional Reform were amendments made to the Constitution of Turkey in 2017. The reform was backed by the governing Justice and Development Party and the Nationalist Movement Party. The reform altered the elections of the Supreme Board of Judges and Prosecutors, the Presidency, and the Parliament. It saw the transformation of Turkey's semi-presidential system into a presidential system one with the abolition of the office of the Prime Minister of Turkey and the transfer of executive authority to the President of Turkey.

== Constitutional amendments ==
Description of proposed amendments
Proposal #	Article	Description of changes
1	Article 9	The judiciary is required to act on the condition of impartiality.
2	Article 75	The number of seats in the Grand National Assembly of Turkey is raised from 550 to 600.
3	Article 76	The age requirement to stand as a candidate in an election was lowered from 25 to 18, while the condition of having to complete compulsory military service is removed. Individuals with relations to the military are ineligible to run for election.
4	Article 77	Parliamentary terms are extended from four to five years. Parliamentary and presidential elections will be held on the same day every five years, with presidential elections going to a run-off if no candidate wins a simple majority in the first round.
(Rejected)	Article 78	All parliamentary candidates on a party's list that were not elected obtain the status of 'reserve' MPs. If an MP for their constituency dies or has their membership terminated, then reserve MPs fill the vacant seat in accordance to their rank on their party's list. In addition, all parties are required to field 5% more candidates than there are seats available in a given constituency, with a minimum of two extra candidates, in case all the constituency candidates of a party are elected. Independent candidates are required to field one reserve independent candidate when running for election. Reserve MPs do not have any additional rights or privileges that are enjoyed by serving MPs unless they become sitting MPs by filling a vacant seat. Parliamentary or presidential elections can be delayed for a maximum of one year if a state of war prevents elections from being held.
5	Article 84	The powers of Parliament to scrutinise ministers and hold the government to account, as well has granting ministers the power to issue decrees regarding certain matters, are abolished.
6	Article 98	The obligation of ministers to answer questions orally in Parliament is abolished.
7	Article 101	In order to stand as a presidential candidate, an individual requires the endorsement of one or more parties that won 5% or more in the preceding parliamentary elections and 100,000 voters. The elected president no longer needs to terminate their party membership if they have one.
8	Article 104	The President becomes both the head of state and head of government, with the power to appoint and sack ministers and vice presidents. The president can call referendums and issue decrees at will, though decrees will only hold if they concern certain parts of the constitution and are not overridden by parliamentary legislation.
9	Article 105	Parliamentary investigations into possible crimes committed by the President can begin in Parliament with a three-fifths vote in favour. Following the completion of investigations, the parliament can vote to indict the President with a two-thirds vote in favour.
10	Article 106	The President can appoint one or more Vice Presidents. If the Presidency falls vacant, then fresh presidential elections must be held within 45 days. If parliamentary elections are due within less than a year, then they too are held on the same day as early presidential elections. If the parliament has over a year left before its term expires, then the newly elected president serves until the end of the parliamentary term, after which both presidential and parliamentary elections are held. This does not count towards the President's two-term limit. Parliamentary investigations into possible crimes committed by Vice Presidents and ministers can begin in Parliament with a three-fifths vote in favour. Following the completion of investigations, the parliament can vote to indict Vice Presidents or ministers with a two-thirds vote in favour. If found guilty, the Vice President or minister in question is only removed from office if their crime is one that bars them from running for election. If a sitting MP is appointed as a minister or Vice President, their parliamentary membership is terminated and is taken by a reserve MP.
11	Article 116	The President and five-third of the Parliament can decide to renew elections. In this case, the enactor also dissolves itself until elections.
12	Article 119	The ability to declare a state of emergency is given to the President, taking effect following parliamentary approval. States of emergency can be extended for up to four months at a time except during war, where the state of emergency is indefinite.
(Rejected)	Article 123	The President is given the right to appoint senior bureaucratic officials, as well as define their roles.
(Rejected)	Article 126	The functions, structure, powers and responsibilities of the civil service are shaped according to presidential decree, with Parliament having its powers in shaping the civil service through law revoked.
13	Article 142	Military courts are abolished unless they are erected to investigate actions of soldiers under conditions of war.
14	Article 159	
15	Article 161	
16	Several articles	
17	Temporary Article 21	
18	Several articles	

== Referendum ==
All eighteen proposed amendments to the constitution were approved by parliamentary vote on 20 January 2017. A national referendum was held in 17 April 2017 to confirm the proposed reforms. A majority of 51.41% voted "yes" to approve the proposal with a turnout rate of 85.43%.

== Reforms on Authorities of President ==
- President is head of state and head of government
- Appoints Vice President and Ministries
- Appoints 4 members of Supreme Board of Judges and Prosecutors and 12 members of Constitutional Court
- Can dissolve the Parliament but President will also go to elections if President does it.
- Can declare State of Emergency.
- Make the budget and send to Parliament.
- Can make bylaws about executive. These bylaws will be examined by Constitutional Court.

== Reforms on Authorities of Parliament ==
- Parliament is the head of legislative.
- Has 600 MPs.
- Detects President's cabinet and Vice President with Parliamentary Research, Parliamentary Investigation, General Discussion and Written Question.
- Appoints 7 members of Supreme Board of Judges and Prosecutors and 3 members of Constitutional Court.
- Can dissolve President but the Parliament will also go to the elections.
- Investigating possible crimes committed by the President can begin in Parliament with a three-fifths vote in favour.
- Approve or disapprove bylaws made by President.
- Approve or disapprove State of Emergency. State of Emergency can be extended, shorten or removed by Parliament.
- Approve or disapprove the budget made by President.

== Reforms of elections ==
- Elections will be held in every five years for both Parliament and Presidency.
- A president can be a candidate for only two times.
- Election and Selection age is 18.
