= 1961 Turkish Senate election =

Senate elections were held in Turkey on 15 October 1961. In this election 150 members of the senate were elected by first-past-the-post system. The result was surprising because the party with second greatest number of votes nationwide won twice as many seats as the leading party.

== Results ==
Party	Votes	%	Seats
Republican People's Party	3,734,285	37.02	36
Justice Party	3,560,675	35.30	71
New Turkey Party	1,401,637	13.90	27
Republican Villagers Nation Party	1,350,892	13.39	16
Independents	39,558	0.39	0
Total	10,087,047	100.00	150
Total votes	10,519,659	–	
Registered voters/turnout	12,926,837	81.38	
Source: Nohlen et al.
