= Court of Jurisdictional Disputes =

One of the four higher courts of Turkey

- Uyuşmazlık Mahkemesi
- Interactive map of Court of Jurisdictional Disputes
- 39.84576884°N 32.79048264°E
- Established: 1945
- Jurisdiction: Turkey
- Location: Ankara
- Coordinates: 39.84576884°N 32.79048264°E
- Website: www.uyusmazlik.gov.tr

The Court of Jurisdictional Disputes (Turkish: Uyuşmazlık Mahkemesi, also translated as Court of Jurisdictional Conflicts) is one of the four higher courts in the Republic of Turkey. It is tasked with disputes between civil and administrative courts concerning their jurisdiction and judgments. Before the abolishment of military courts in 2017, the court also looked at the disputes involving the military courts.

== Constitution ==
The role and tasks of the Court of Jurisdictional Disputes are prescribed by the Constitution of Turkey within the section on the supreme courts.

According to Article 158 of the Turkish Constitution (1982),

"The Court of Jurisdictional Disputes shall be empowered to deliver final judgments in disputes between civil and administrative courts concerning their jurisdiction and judgments.

The organization of the Court of Jurisdictional Disputes, the qualifications and electoral procedure of its members, and its functioning shall be regulated by law. The office of president of this Court shall be held by a member delegated by the Constitutional Court from among its own members. Decisions of the Constitutional Court shall take precedence in jurisdictional disputes between the Constitutional Court and other courts."

== List of presidents ==
	President	Term of office	
1	Osman Yeten	15 September 1962	26 May 1964
2	İbrahim Hilmi Senil	26 May 1964	19 November 1965
3	Şemsettin Akçaoğlu	19 November 1965	5 December 1967
4	Recai Seçkin	5 December 1967	16 June 1970
5	Ali Fazıl Uluocak	16 June 1970	3 June 1973
6	Ahmet Hamdi Boyacıoğlu	3 June 1973	9 August 1982
7	Servet Tüzün	16 September 1982	6 September 1987
8	Selahattin Metin	6 September 1987	15 April 1988
9	Muammer Turan	18 April 1988	10 June 1990
10	Yılmaz Aliefendioğlu	22 June 1990	6 September 1991
11	Mustafa Şahin	6 September 1991	1 July 1993
12	Selçuk Tüzün	15 July 1993	14 February 1998
14	Mustafa Bumin	17 March 1998	15 July 1999
15	Ali Hüner	15 July 1999	6 July 2003
16	Yalçın Acargün	9 July 2003	3 January 2004
17	Tülay Tuğcu	6 January 2004	25 July 2005
18	Ahmet Akyalçın	12 September 2005	16 March 2012
19	Serdar Özgüldür	22 March 2012	21 March 2016
20	Nuri Necipoğlu	21 March 2016	2 July 2018
21	Hicabi Dursun	2 July 2018	16 July 2020
22	Burhan Üstün	23 July 2020	17 December 2020
23	Celal Mümtaz Akıncı	17 December 2020	Incumbent

== See also ==
- Judicial system of Turkey
