= Judicial system of Turkey =

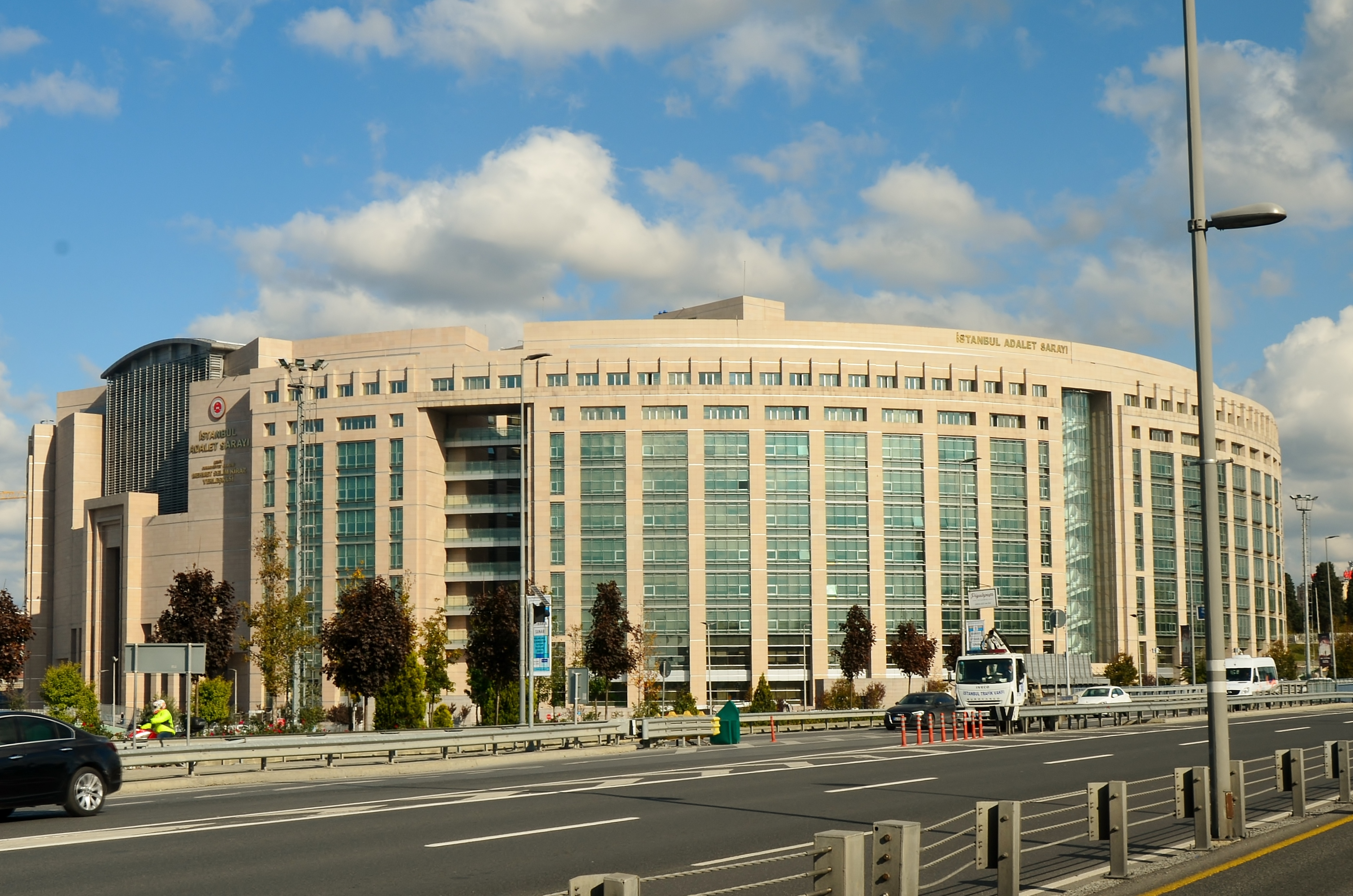
Istanbul Justice Palace is a courthouse in the Şişli district of Istanbul, Turkey

The judicial system of Turkey is defined by Articles 138 to 160 of the Constitution of Turkey.

With the founding of the Republic, Turkey adopted a civil law legal system, replacing Ottoman law and the Sharia courts. The Civil Code, adopted in 1926, was based on the Swiss Civil Code of 1907 and the Swiss Code of Obligations of 1911. Although it underwent a number of changes in 2002, it retains much of the basis of the original Code. The Criminal Code, originally based on the Italian Criminal Code, was replaced in 2005 by a Code with principles similar to the German Penal Code and German law generally. Administrative law is based on the French equivalent and procedural law generally shows the influence of the Swiss, German and French legal systems. The system can be very slow – as of 2024, a land dispute has been ongoing for 53 years. Other parts of government, for example Turkstat, sometimes do not obey court orders. ECHR judgements are sometimes not implemented.

== The legal profession ==
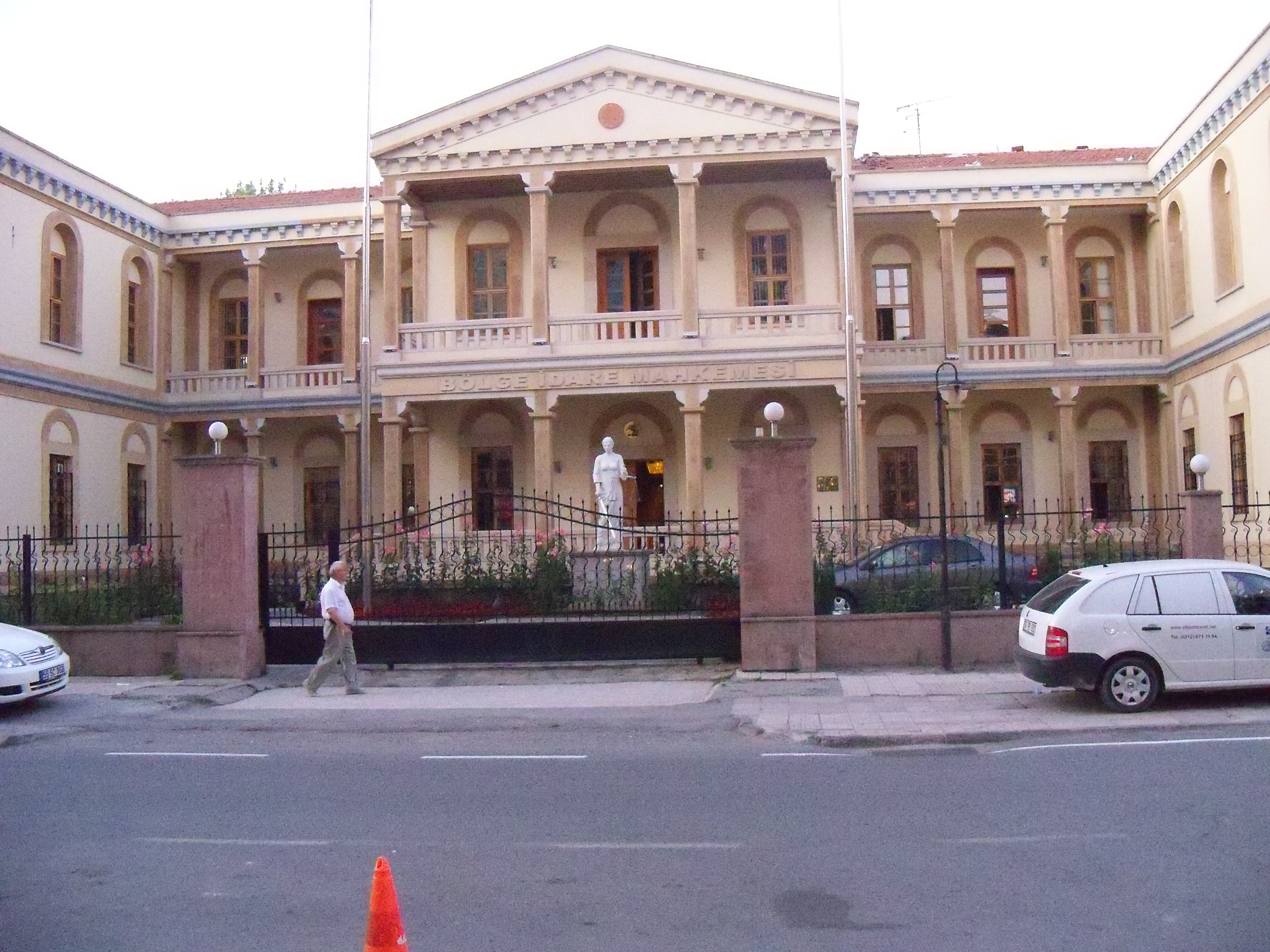
Historical Court of Justice building in Samsun.

The general term for members of the legal profession in Turkey is hukukçu. In Turkey, any man or woman, after having graduated from a law faculty at a university, can become attorney-at-law or barrister (avukat), judge (hâkim or yargıç), prosecutor (savcı) or notary (noter) after terms of internship specified in separate laws. However, before obtaining the title of trainee judge (stajyer), the judges and prosecutors have to pass a written exam, which is held by the Measuring, Selection and Placement Center (ÖSYM), and an interview carried out by a committee mainly consisting of judges.

=== Judges ===
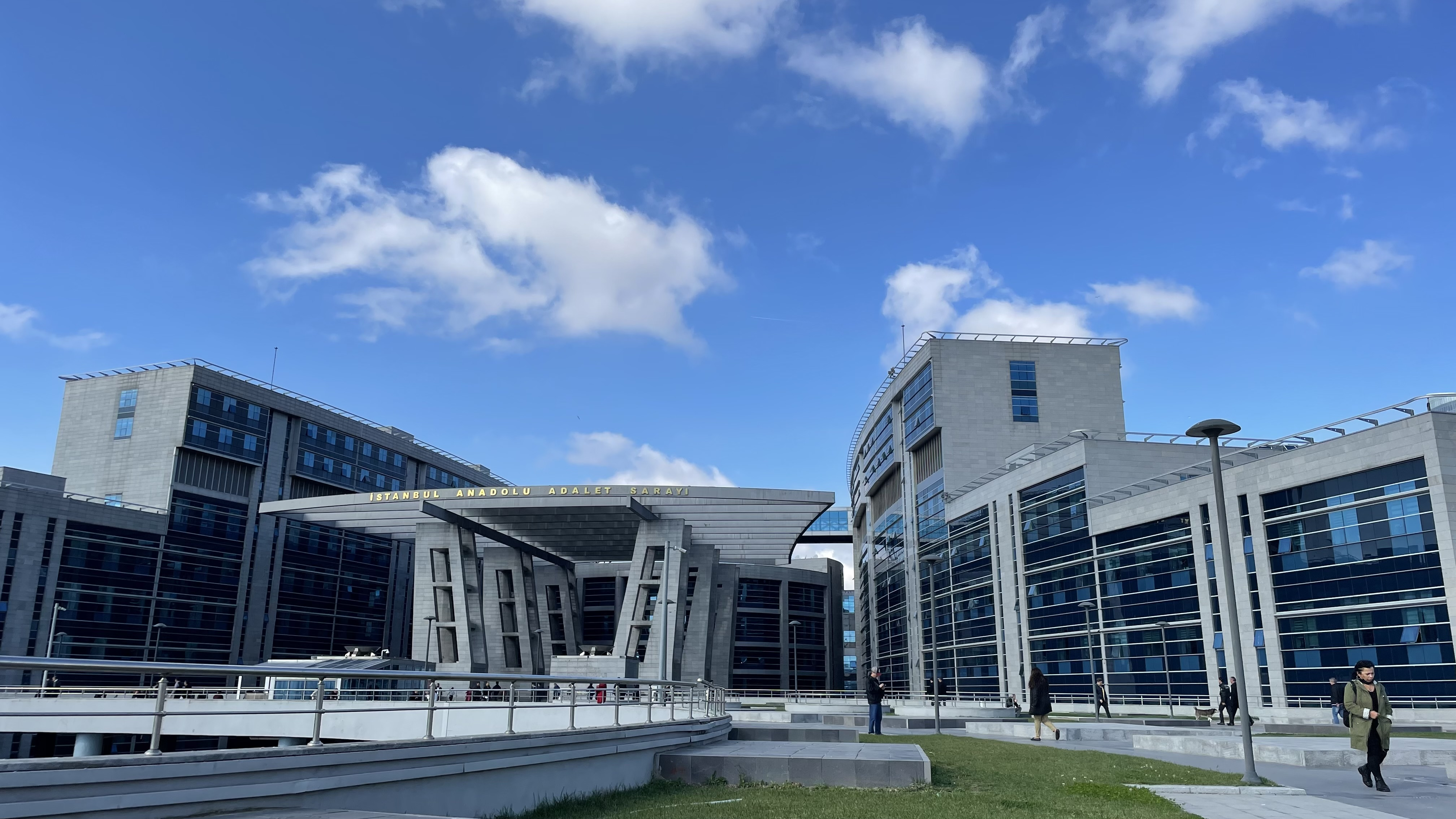
Court of Justice building in Kartal, Istanbul.

There are no juries in the Turkish legal system. Verdicts for both criminal and civil trials are decided by a judge, or usually a panel of three judges, who have to base their verdicts on the law and their conviction. A judge is also a law school graduate and can be one of the following:

- Criminal Judge (wears a black robe with a red collar),
- Civil Judge (wears a black robe with a green collar),
- Administrative Judge (wears a black robe with a gray collar).

The criminal judges serve at a penal court. These courts (mahkemeler) are separated into ağır ceza (assize court), asliye ceza (penal court of first instance), and sulh ceza (penal court of peace). The civil judges serve at civil courts of first instance or at civil courts of peace (sulh or asliye hukuk mahkemeleri), while administrative judges serve in administrative courts (idari mahkemeler). The Council of Judges and Public Prosecutors (Hâkimler ve Savcılar Kurulu) deals with the admission of judges and public prosecutors of courts of justice and administrative courts into the profession, appointments, transfers to other posts, the delegation of temporary powers, promotion to the first category, the allocation of posts; decisions concerning those whose continuation in the profession is found to be unsuitable; the imposition of disciplinary penalties and removal from office. After the Constitutional amendment that took place 2010, the composition of the High Council of Judges and Prosecutors was completely changed. It currently consists of 22 members. Ten members out of 22 are elected among the judges and prosecutors by their colleagues working in first instance courts. While five members are supreme judges elected by other supreme judges, four members of High Council are appointed among lawyers and law professors by the President of Republic and one comes from Judicial Academy. Minister of Justice is the president of High Council and The Undersecretary of the Justice Minister is also an ex-officio member. In the existing system, the High Council of Judges and Prosecutors has its own Secretariat. In addition, the Inspection Board operates under the authority of High Council.

=== Prosecutors ===
Public charges are brought by prosecutors (savcı). Their full title is Prosecutor of the Republic (Cumhuriyet savcısı) and they have a chief office of prosecution (Cumhuriyet Başsavcılığı). Prosecutors are also divided into branches regarding their area in laws, similar to that of the judges. The Supreme Council of Judges and Public Prosecutors deals with administrative matters concerning judges of the Administrative and Judicial Courts and Public Prosecutors who are not members of the Court of Cassation or the Council of State. In the Country Report on Human Rights Practices in Turkey in 2006 (released by the Bureau of Democracy, Human Rights, and Labor in the US State Department on March 6, 2007) it was stated:

The High Council of Judges and Prosecutors was widely criticized for undermining the independence of the judiciary. The minister of justice serves as chairman of the seven-member high council, and the justice ministry undersecretary also serves on the council. The high council selects judges and prosecutors for the higher courts and is responsible for oversight of the lower courts. The high council is located in the Ministry of Justice and does not have its own budget. While the constitution provides for job security through tenure, the high council controls the careers of judges and prosecutors through appointments, transfers, promotions, reprimands, and other mechanisms.

== Courts ==
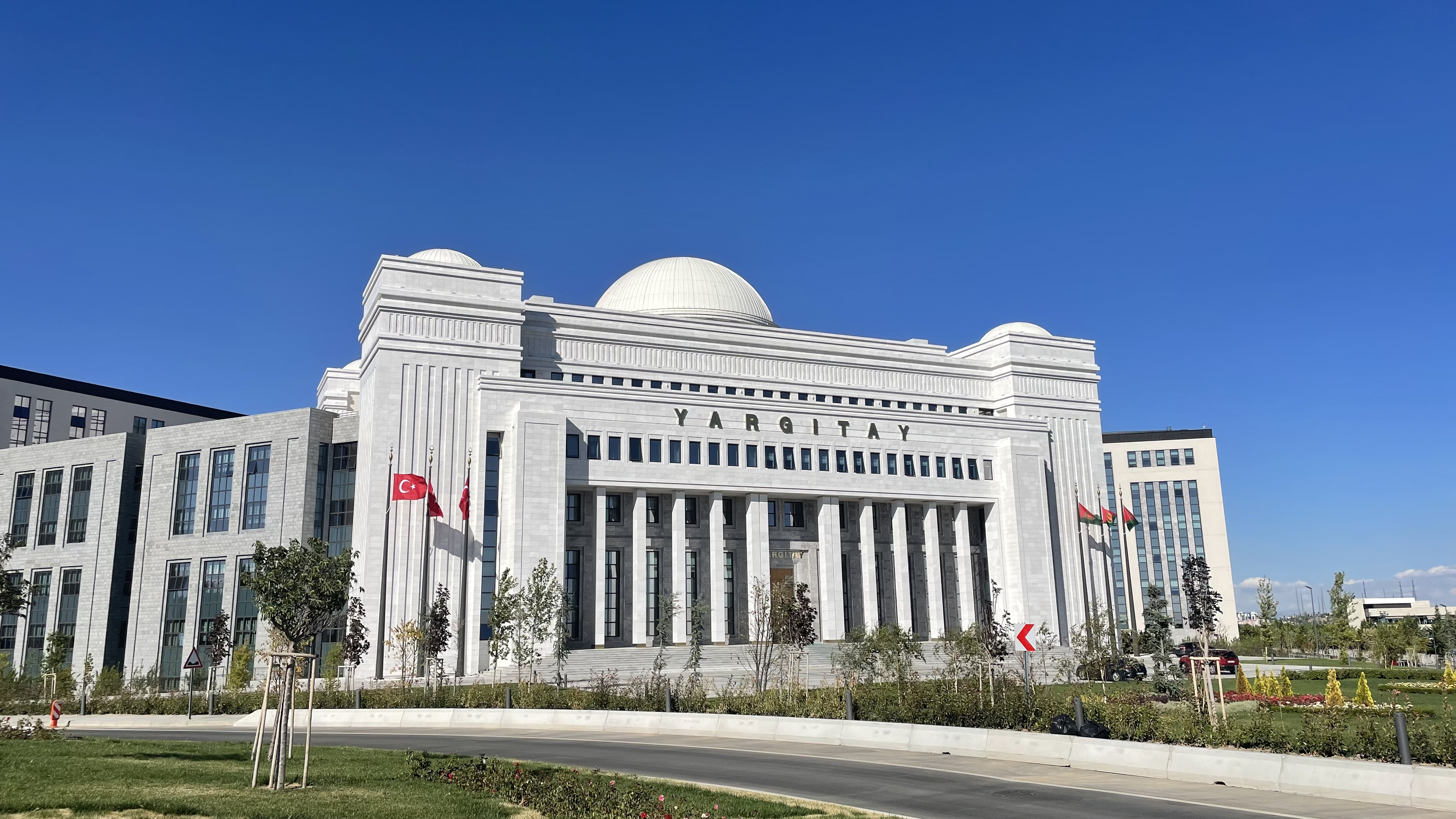
The Court of Cassation is the last instance for reviewing verdicts given by courts of criminal and civil justice in Turkey.

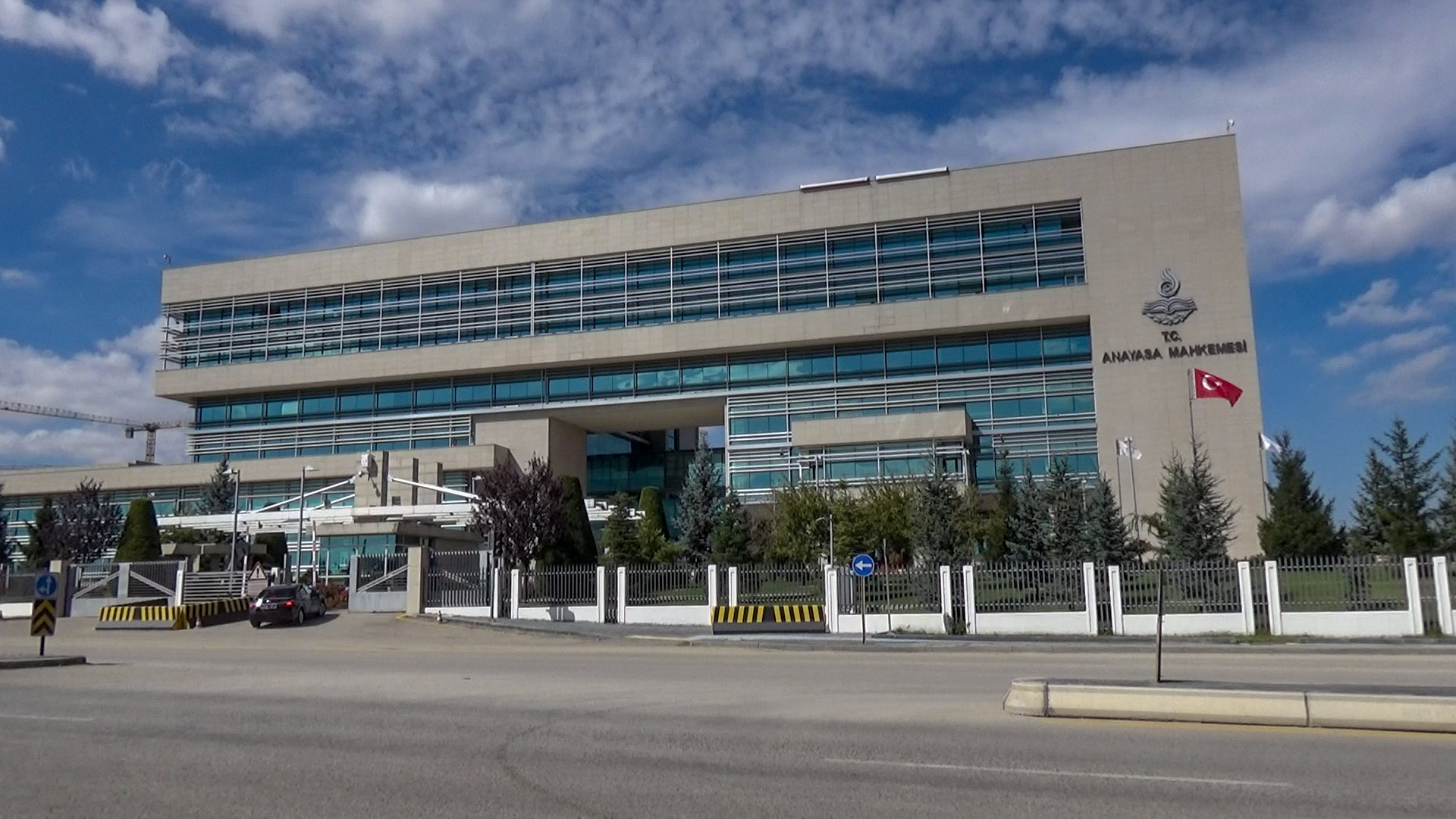
The Constitutional Court is the highest legal body for constitutional review in Turkey.

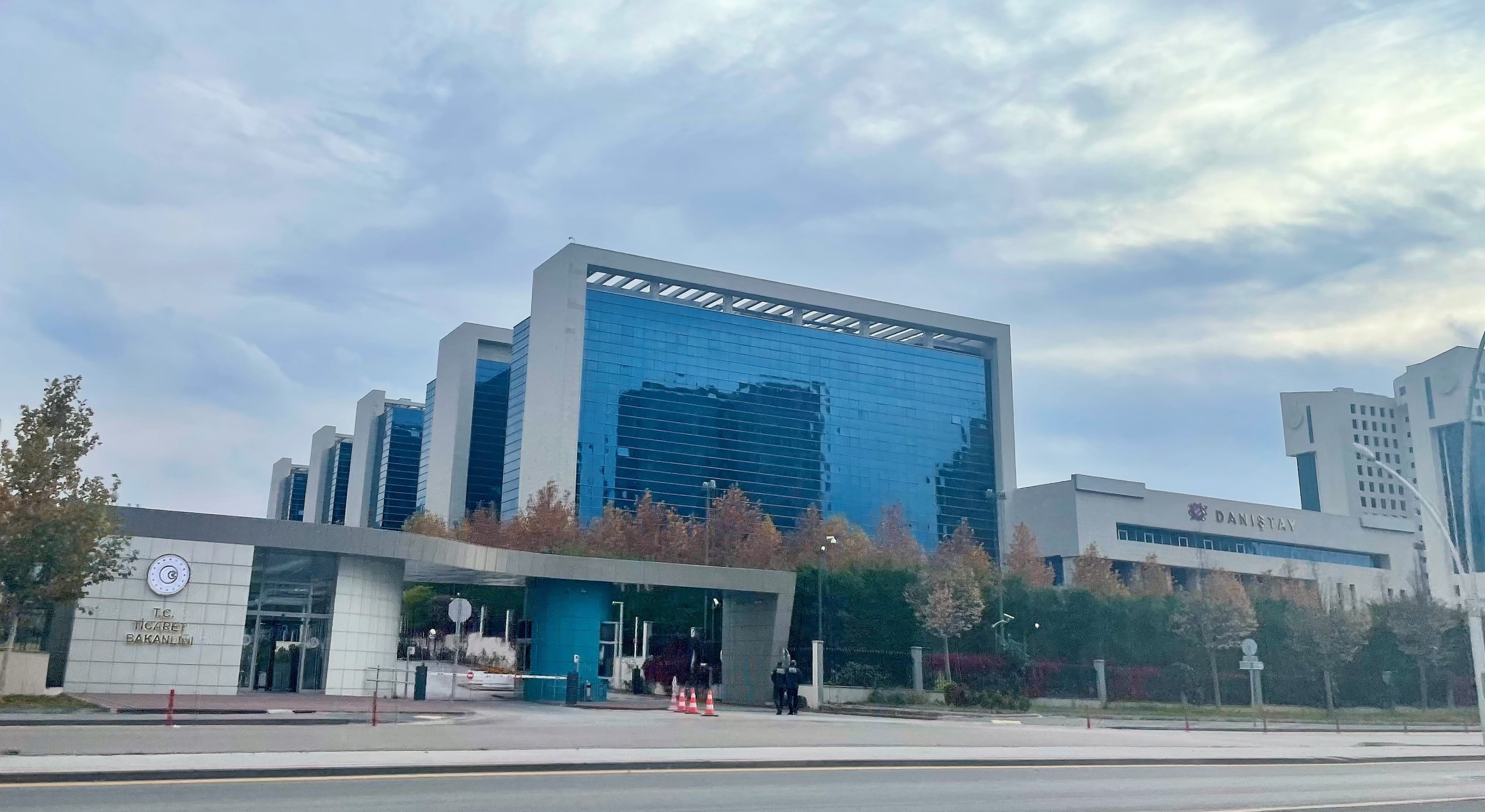
Council of State in Ankara

The judicial system is composed of general law courts; specialized heavy penal courts; the Constitutional Court, the nation's highest court; and three other high courts. The Court of Cassation hears appeals for criminal cases, the council of state hears appeals of administrative cases or cases between government entities, and the audit court audits state institutions. Most cases were prosecuted in the general law courts, which include civil, administrative, and criminal courts. In 2004 parliament adopted legislation providing for the establishment of regional appeals courts to relieve the high court's caseload and allow the judiciary to operate more efficiently.

=== Supreme courts ===
The Constitution mentions the following 4 organizations as higher courts in the country:

- Constitutional Court (Anayasa Mahkemesi), for constitutional adjudication and review of individual applications concerning human rights violations
- Court of Cassation (Yargıtay), the final decision maker in ordinary judiciary
- Council of State (Danıştay), the final decision maker in administrative judiciary
- Court of Jurisdictional Disputes (Uyuşmazlık Mahkemesi), for resolving the disputes between these courts for constitutional jurisdiction

==== The Constitutional Court ====
The basic function of the Constitutional Court (Anayasa Mahkemesi), established under the 1961 Constitution and retained in the 1982 Constitution, is to review the constitutionality, in both form and substance, of laws, presidential decrees, and the Rules of Procedure of the Grand National Assembly of Turkey (GNAT). It also reviews constitutional amendments as to form.

In addition, the Court performs the following functions:

- Acting as the High Tribunal (Yüce Divan), it tries the President, vice presidents, ministers, and certain high-ranking judicial officials for offences related to their official duties.
- It decides on the dissolution of political parties and reviews applications for the deprivation of state aid to political parties.
- It audits the finances of political parties.
- It examines decisions of the GNAT concerning the lifting of parliamentary immunity or the dismissal of members of parliament.
- It adjudicates individual applications alleging violations of fundamental rights and freedoms guaranteed by the Constitution and within the scope of the European Convention on Human Rights (since 2012).

The Constitutional Court is composed of fifteen members. Decisions are taken by an absolute majority of members attending a session, unless otherwise required by the Constitution. The Court’s decisions are final and binding on the legislative, executive, and judicial authorities; they cannot be appealed and must be implemented without delay.

As of 2026, the President of the Constitutional Court is Kadir Özkaya, who assumed office on 20 April 2024.

==== The Court of Cassation ====
The Court of Cassation (Yargıtay) is the last instance for reviewing rulings and judgments rendered by justice courts, criminal courts, the examination courts and renders verdicts upon appeal. The opinions rendered by the Court of Cassation are taken as precedents for legal rulings in the first instance courts throughout the country, so that uniform application may be achieved. It is also able to modify its own ruling upon request.

The Court of Cassation is divided into civil law and penal law chambers (hukuk ve ceza daireleri).Though Yargitay currently 20 civil and 20 criminal chambers, after the amendment of Yargitay Act in 2016 by the Parliament, the number of chambers will be decreased to 12 civil and 12 criminal chambers and total number of member of Court will be decreased to 210 until the end of 2018.

The highest judge, who holds the title First President (Birinci Başkan), is currently Mehmet Akarca. The Court of Cassation also has a Chief Public Prosecutor (Yargitay Cumhuriyet Başsavcısı), who is currently Bekir Şahin. In case of indictments against political parties, the Chief Public Prosecutor of the Court of Cassation appears before the Constitutional Court.

==== The Council of State ====
The Turkish Council of State (Danıştay) is the highest administrative court in Turkey. It is equivalent to a federal supreme administrative court such as the Conseil d'Etat in France or the Federal Administrative Court of Germany (Bundesverwaltungsgericht).

==== The Court of Jurisdictional Disputes ====
The Court of Jurisdictional Disputes (Uyuşmazlık Mahkemesi) is the final authority to settle disputes concerning verdicts and the competences of the Justice, Administrative or Military Courts. This court is made up of members from the Court of Cassation's General Assembly and the Council of State's General Assembly.

=== Judicial courts ===
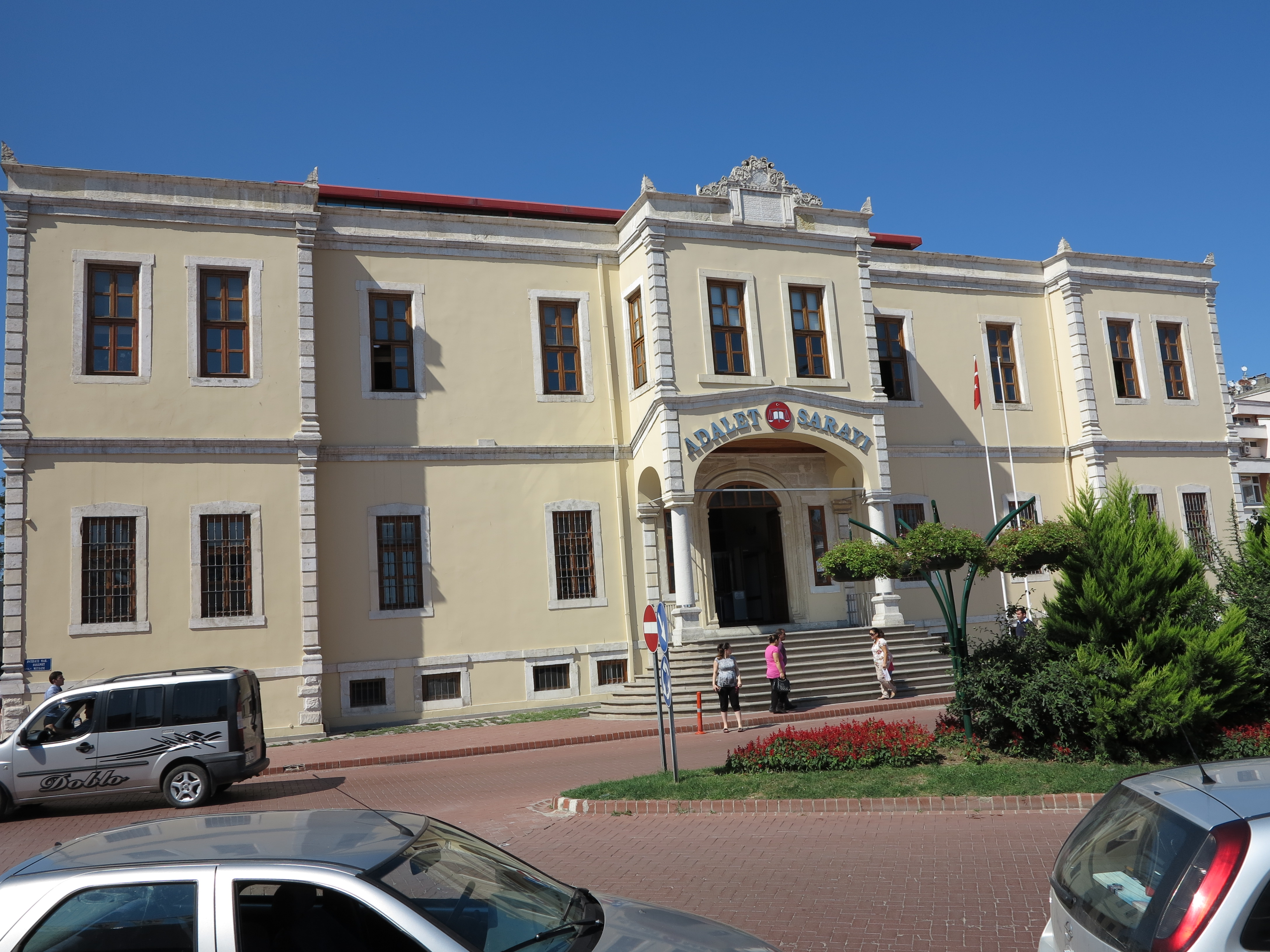
Civil Court Building in Sinop.

==== Civil courts ====
Civil courts look at cases related to subjects like ownership, contract violation, divorce and inheritance. There are two forms of civil courts: the Peace Courts and the Civil Courts of First Instance. The Peace Courts (Sulh Mahkemeleri) are the lowest civil courts in Turkey with a single judge. There is at least one in every district. Its jurisdiction covers all cases assigned to the court by the Code of Civil Procedure and other laws. The second form is the Civil Courts of First Instance (Asliye Hukuk Mahkemeleri), which are the basic courts. Their jurisdiction covers all civil cases other than those assigned to the peace courts. There is one in every city and district, and sometimes divided into several branches according to the need and necessity.

==== Criminal courts ====
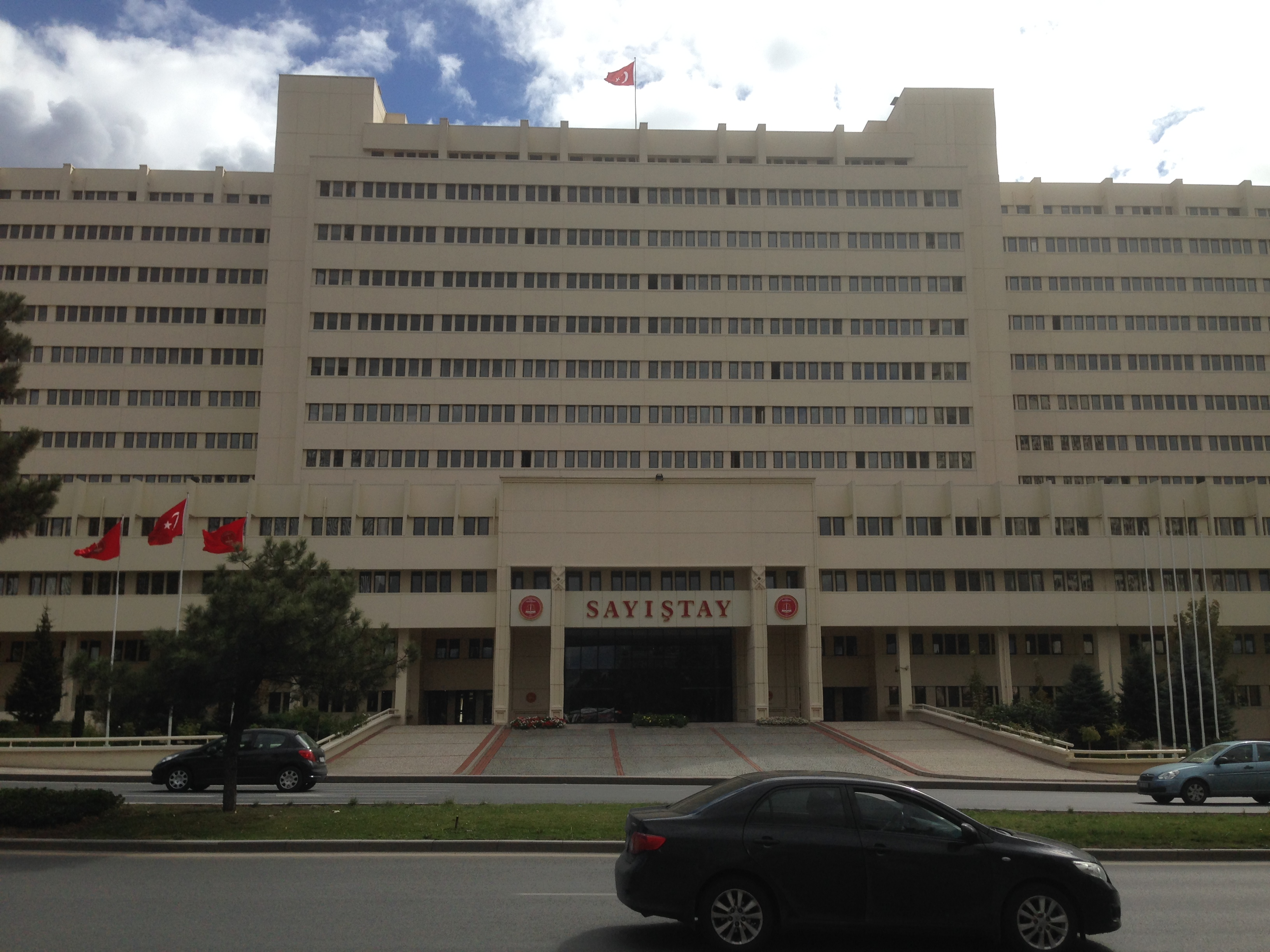
Court of Accounts building in Ankara.

Criminal courts look at cases related to subjects like assault, robbery, murder, arson and rape. Even though the penalties are no longer divided into light and heavy sentences, the criminal courts still are named according to the penalties they were entitled to pass. Penal courts of first instance (or simply penal courts, asliye ceza) are courts with a single judge deciding on minor cases. There is one in every city and in every district, sometimes divided into several branches according to the need and population. The heavy penal courts (Interpol terms them Central Criminal Courts) consist of a presiding judge and two members with a public prosecutor. Offenses and crimes involving a penalty of over five years of imprisonment are under the jurisdiction of these courts of which there is one in every city, but it is sometimes divided into several branches according to the need and population.

=== Administrative courts ===
Administrative courts (idari mahkemeler) exist at provincial level. The next instance are regional administrative courts (bölge idari mahkemeleri). Administrative courts solved cases involving probate, bankruptcy, and citizenship matters. Tax and family law were handled in separate courts. The highest administrative court in Turkey is the Turkish Council of State (Danıştay also called Supreme Administrative Court) or, equivalent to a federal supreme administrative court such as the Conseil d'Etat in France or the Federal Administrative Court of Germany (Bundesverwaltungsgericht).

=== Others ===
==== Court of Accounts ====
The Court of Accounts (Sayıştay) is Turkey's supreme audit institution charged with auditing, on behalf of the Parliament, all accounts related to the revenues, expenditures and property of government departments financed by general and subsidiary budgets. No applications for judicial review of its decisions shall be filed in administrative courts. There's a debate on whether Sayıştay is a supreme court, or even a court in the strictest sense. The Turkish constitution is said to contradict with itself by not listing Sayıştay amongst supreme courts in articles 146-159 while allowing no appeals to most of its decisions, effectively giving it supreme court power.

==== Alternative dispute resolution (ADR) ====
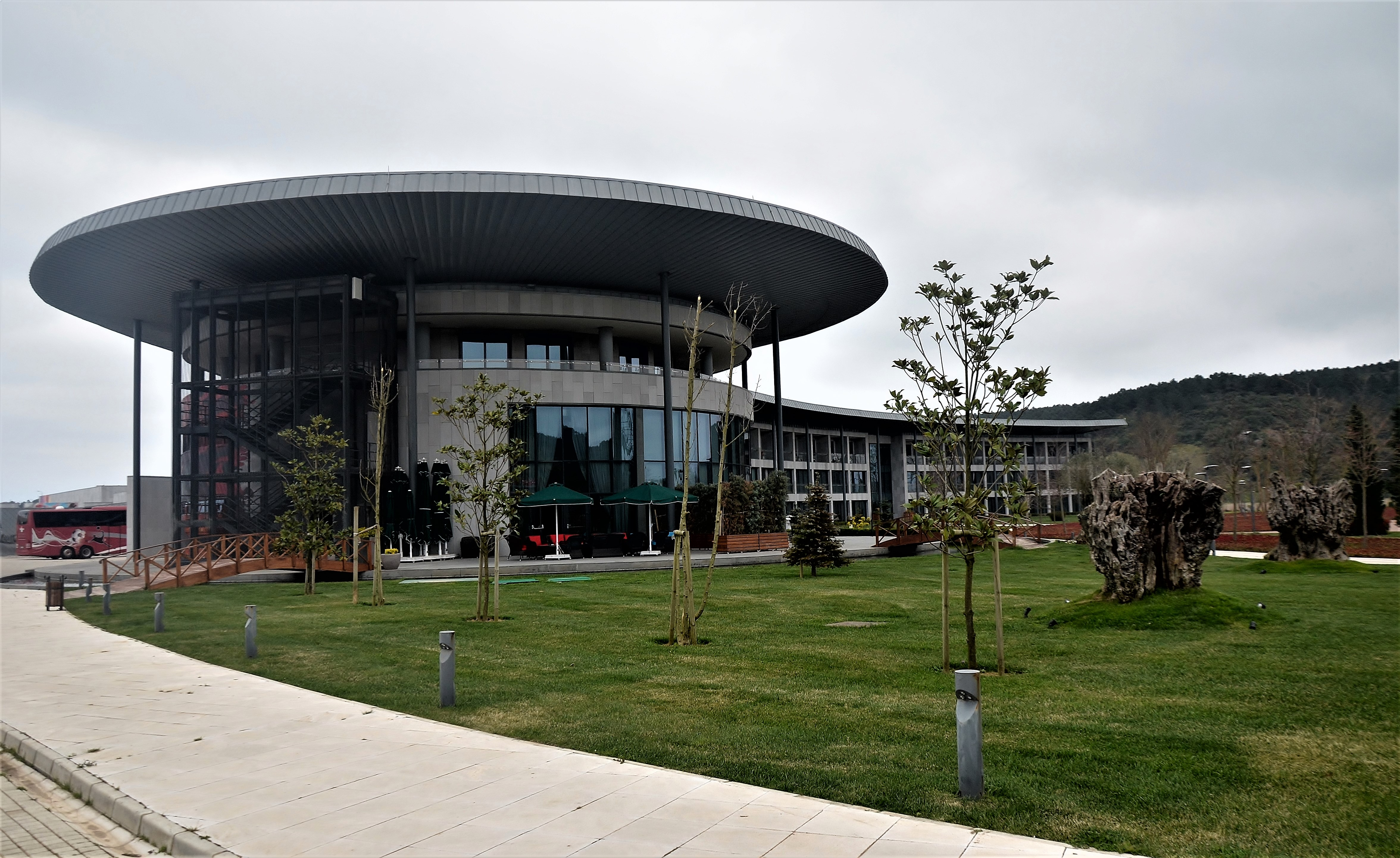
Turkish Football Federation Facility at Riva, Beykoz in Istanbul

In certain disputes, the parties are not permitted by law to apply to court before exhausting alternative dispute resolution (ADR) processes, whereas in some other disputes, the parties can voluntarily apply to have their dispute settled through ADR. For instance, it is required to undergo mediation in disputes between an employee and an employer regarding employee receivables and reemployment claims before filing a lawsuit in the matter. Likewise, it is mandatory to undergo a mediation process in relation to commercial disputes before initiating litigation proceedings before the relevant court. Some other quasi-legal authorities that must be used before applying to court are as follows:

- Arbitration Committee for Consumer Problems.
- Sports Arbitration Committee.
- Turkish Football Federation Arbitration Committee.

== Former courts ==
=== Civilian justice ===
==== Independence Tribunal ====
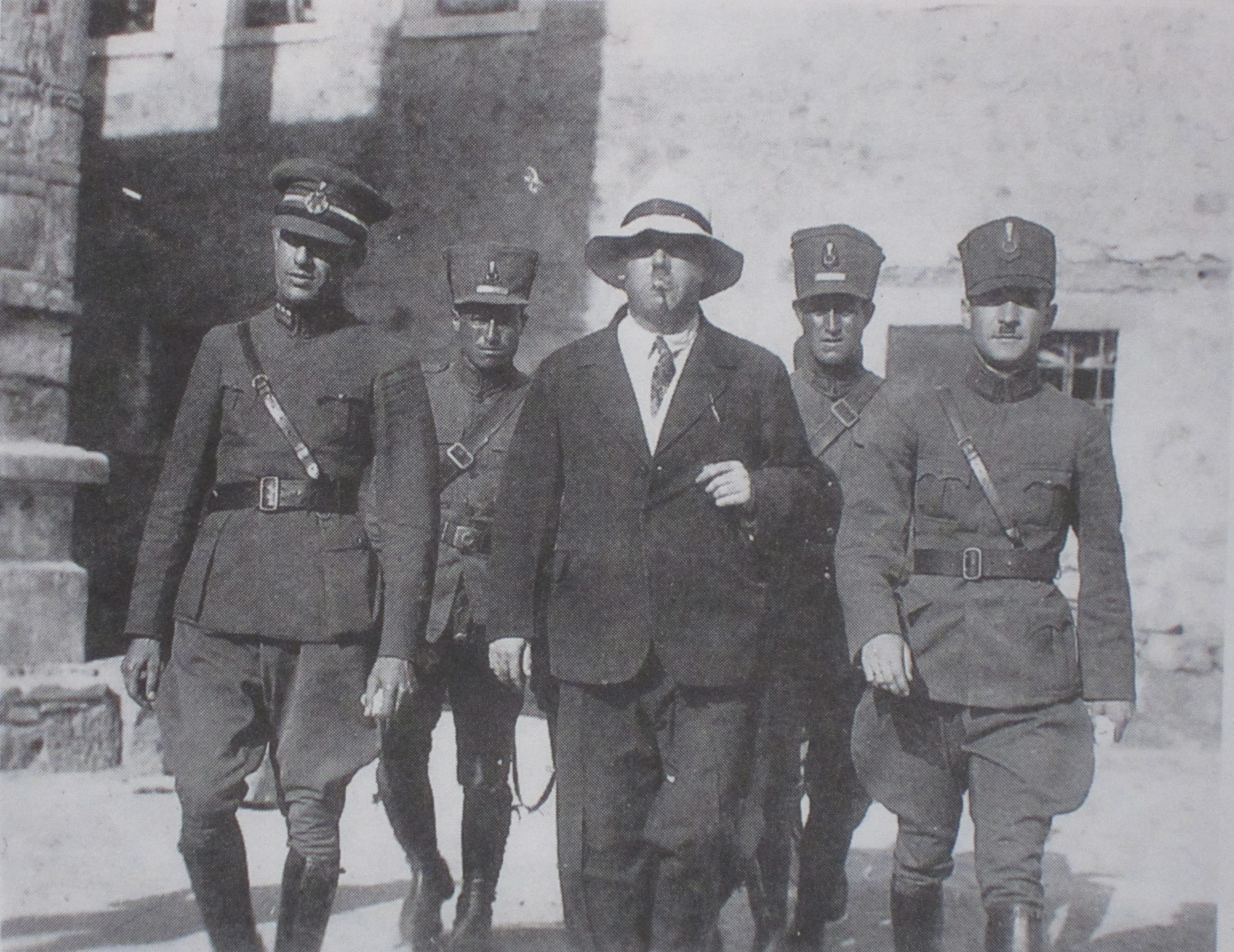
Abidin Bey walking into the Independence Tribunal in İzmir.

An Independence Tribunal (İstiklâl Mahkemesi) was a court invested with superior authority and the first were established in 1920 during the Turkish War of Independence in order to prosecute those who were against the system of the government. Eight such courts were established. They were located in Ankara, Eskişehir, Konya, Isparta, Sivas, Kastamonu, Pozantı, and Diyarbakır. The last one was abolished in 1927.

==== State Security Courts ====
Under the 1982 Constitution the then military government established State Security Courts (Devlet Güvenlik Mahkemeleri, DGM) to try cases involving crimes against the security of the state, and organized crime. It would also act as a domestic tribunal to try cases involving genocide, crimes against humanity, and war crimes. The DGMs began to operate from May 1984 and replaced military courts which had been in operation during the martial law period. They existed only in eight (of then 67 and now 81) provinces.

In April 1991 the Law to Fight Terrorism (Law 3713) entered into force and cases involving crimes against the security of the state were now punishable under this law. The panel of three judges in each DGM included a military judge. As armed forces officers, such military judges remained dependent on the military for salary and pension, subject to military discipline and therefore not independent of military control. In a number of cases the European Court of Human Rights has found the presence of military judges in the State Security Courts to be a violation of the fair trial principles set out in Article 6 of the European Convention for the Protection of Human Rights and Fundamental Freedoms (ECHR).

On the 18 June 1999 the then Grand National Assembly of Turkey voted to ban military judges from the bench of State Security Courts. In the context of a package of reforms to the Constitution passed in June 2004, the DGMs were formally abolished. The DGMs were transformed into Heavy Penal Courts, authorized to try only cases involving organized crime and terrorism. In cases of state security, genocide, crimes against humanity, or war crimes, the military discipline courts would take over. Since the entering into law of a new Criminal Procedure Code on 1 June 2005, the official name for these courts has been "Heavy Penal Courts (competent to examine crimes under article 250 of the Criminal Procedure Code)". Most of the cases heard in these courts concern cases of political prisoners.

=== Military justice ===
Abolished in 2017, the military related cases were picked up by the Heavy Penal Courts and the Criminal Courts of first instance. The military court system exercised jurisdiction over military personnel and during periods of martial law. The duties are described in Article 11 of Law 1402 on Martial Law of May 1971. Further details are laid out in Articles 11 to 14 of Law 353 on the Foundation and Criminal Procedures at Military Courts of October 1963 (revised in October 2006).

The military court system consisted of

- military courts,
- a supreme military administrative court, and
- the military court of cassation.

==== Military courts ====
Military Courts had jurisdiction to try military personnel for military offenses, for offenses committed by them against other military personnel or crimes committed in military places, or for offenses connected with military service and duties. Under martial law military courts were competent to try all offences that led to the announcement of martial law. Article 14 of Law 353 described the offences to be tried at military courts in time of war.

==== Military Court of Cassation ====
The Military Court of Cassation (Askeri Yargıtay) was the court of final instance for all rulings and verdicts rendered by military courts. It was also a court of first and final instance with jurisdiction over certain military personnel, stipulated by law, with responsibility for any specific trials of these persons. It had a President, usually a brigadier general and a Chief Prosecutor usually a colonel.

== See also ==
- Constitution of Turkey
- Legislation of Turkey
- Executive of Turkey
