= Constitution of Turkey =

Supreme law of the Republic of Turkey

Constitution of the Republic of Turkey

Overview
- Original title: Türkiye Cumhuriyeti Anayasası
- Jurisdiction: Turkey
- Created: 18 October 1982
- Presented: 20 October 1982
- Ratified: 7 November 1982
- Date effective: 9 November 1982
- System: Unitary presidential republic

Government structure
- Branches: Three (executive, legislative, judicial)
- Head of state: President
- Chambers: One (Grand National Assembly)
- Executive: Presidential Cabinet
- Judiciary: Judicial system of Turkey; 4 supreme courts
- Federalism: Unitary
- Electoral college: No
- Entrenchments: First three articles regarding the form and characteristics of the state

History
- First legislature: 6 November 1983
- First executive: 13 December 1983
- Amendments: 19
- Last amended: 16 April 2017
- Commissioned by: National Security Council
- Author: Advisory Parliament of Turkey
- Signatories: 83% of the electorate
- Supersedes: Constitution of 1961

Full text
- Constitution of the Republic of Turkey at Wikisource
- Türkiye Cumhuriyeti Anayasası at Turkish Wikisource

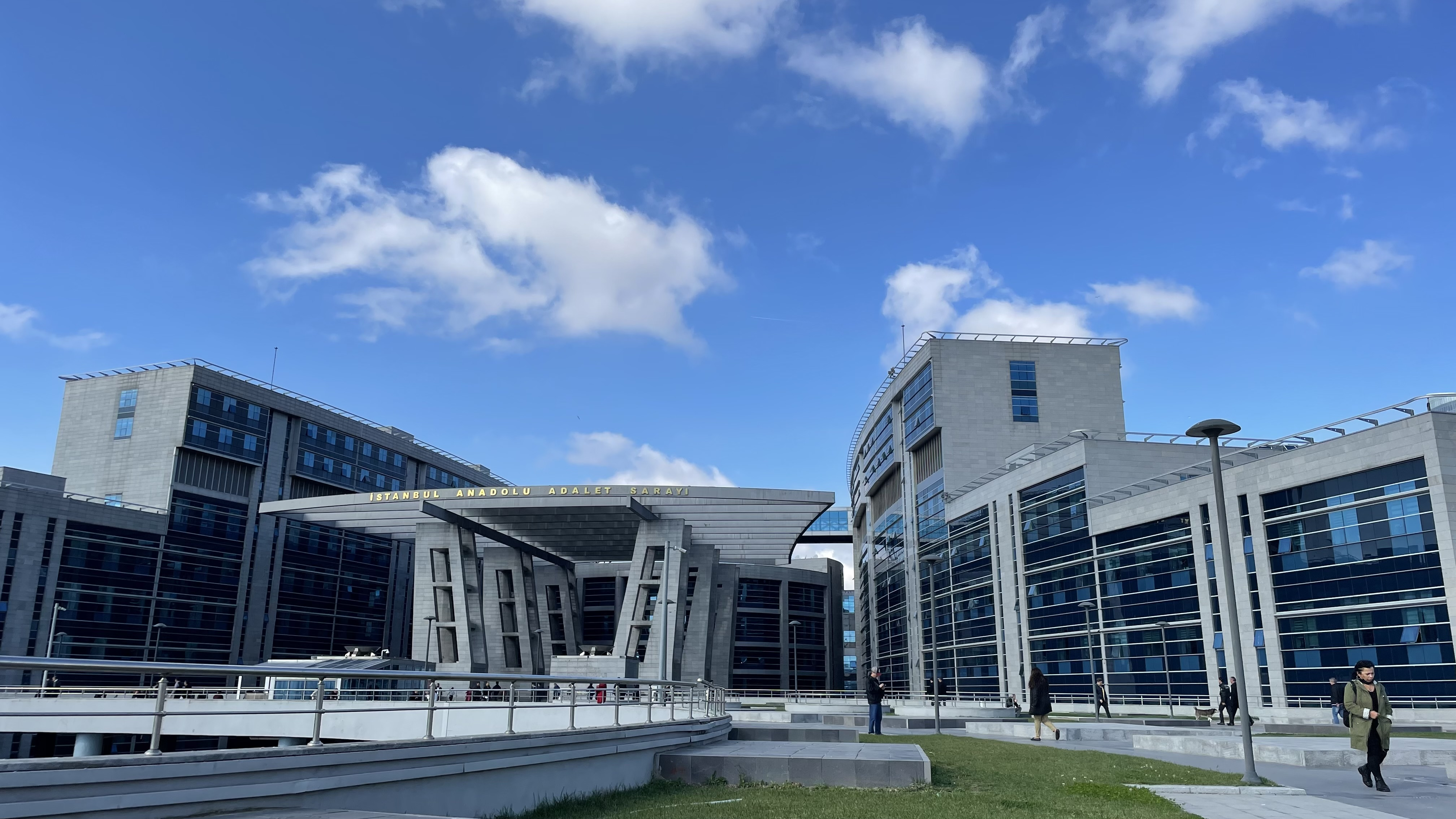
Court of Justice building in Kartal, Istanbul.

The Constitution of Turkey, formally known as the Constitution of the Republic of Turkey (Turkish: Türkiye Cumhuriyeti Anayasası), and informally as the Constitution of 1982 (Turkish: 1982 Anayasası), is Turkey's fundamental law. It establishes the organization of the government, and sets out the principles and rules of the state's conduct along with its responsibilities in regard to its citizens. The constitution also establishes the rights and responsibilities of the latter while setting the guidelines for the delegation and exercise that sovereignty belongs entirely and without doubt to the people.

The constitution was ratified on 7 November 1982. It replaced the earlier Constitution of 1961. The constitution was amended 21 times, three of them through a referendum: 2007, 2010, 2017, one of them partly through referendum: 1987. As of April 2017, 117 of the 177 articles of the Constitution of 1982 were amended overall.

== History ==
The first constitution of the Ottoman Empire was adopted in 1876 and revised in 1908.

Since its founding, the modern Turkish state has been governed under four documents:

- The Constitution of 1921,
- The Constitution of 1924,
- The Constitution of 1961, and,
- The current Constitution of 1982.

The current constitution was ratified by popular referendum during the military junta of 1980-1983. Since its ratification in 1982, the current constitution has overseen many important events and changes in the Republic of Turkey, and it has been modified many times to keep up with global and regional geopolitical conjunctures. Major amendments were made in 2010. A minor amendment to Article 59, on the permissible means for challenging "decisions of sport federations relating to administration and discipline of sportive activities," was made in March 2011. Following the 2017 constitutional referendum, fundamental changes were introduced including changing the parliamentary system in Turkey to a presidential system. The executive, legislative and judiciary power under control by the president may cause less democracy.

== Overview ==
=== Part one: Founding principles ===
The Constitution asserts that Turkey is a secular (2.1) and democratic (2.1) republic (1.1) that derives its sovereignty (6.1) from the people. The sovereignty rests with the Turkish Nation, who delegates its exercise to an elected unicameral parliament, the Turkish Grand National Assembly.

Seal of the Assembly

The Article 4 declares the immovability of the founding principles of the Republic defined in the first three Articles and bans any proposals for their modification. The preamble also invokes the principles of nationalism, defined as the "material and spiritual well-being of the Republic". The basic nature of Turkey is laïcité (2), social equality (2), equality before law (10), the Republican form of government (1), the indivisibility of the Republic and of the Turkish Nation (3.1)." Thus, it sets out to found a unitary nation-state based on the principles of secular democracy.

Fundamental Aims and Duties of the State is defined in Article 5. Constitution establishes a separation of powers between the Legislative Power (7.1), Executive Power (8.1), and Judicial Power (9.1) of the state. The separation of powers between the legislative and the executive is a loose one, whereas the one between the executive and the legislative with the judiciary is a strict one.

=== Part Two: Individual and Group Rights ===
Part Two of the constitution is the bill of rights. Article Twelve guarantees "fundamental rights and freedoms", which are defined as including the:

- Article 17: Personal Inviolability, Material and Spiritual Entity of the Individual (right to life)
- Article 18: Prohibition of Forced Labour
- Article 19: Personal Liberty and Security (security of person)
- Article 20: Privacy of Individual Life
- Article 21: Inviolability of the Domicile
- Article 22: Freedom of Communication
- Article 23: Freedom of Residence and Movement
- Article 24: Freedom of Religion and Conscience
- Article 25: Freedom of Thought and Opinion
- Article 26: Freedom of Expression and Dissemination of Thought
- Article 27: Freedom of Science and the Arts
- Article 35: Right to property

Article Five of the Constitution sets out the raison d'être of the Turkish state, namely "to provide the conditions required for the development of the individual's material and spiritual existence".

Many of these entrenched rights have their basis in international bills of rights, such as the Universal Declaration of Human Rights, which Turkey was one of the first nations to ratify in December 1948.

==== Equality of citizens ====
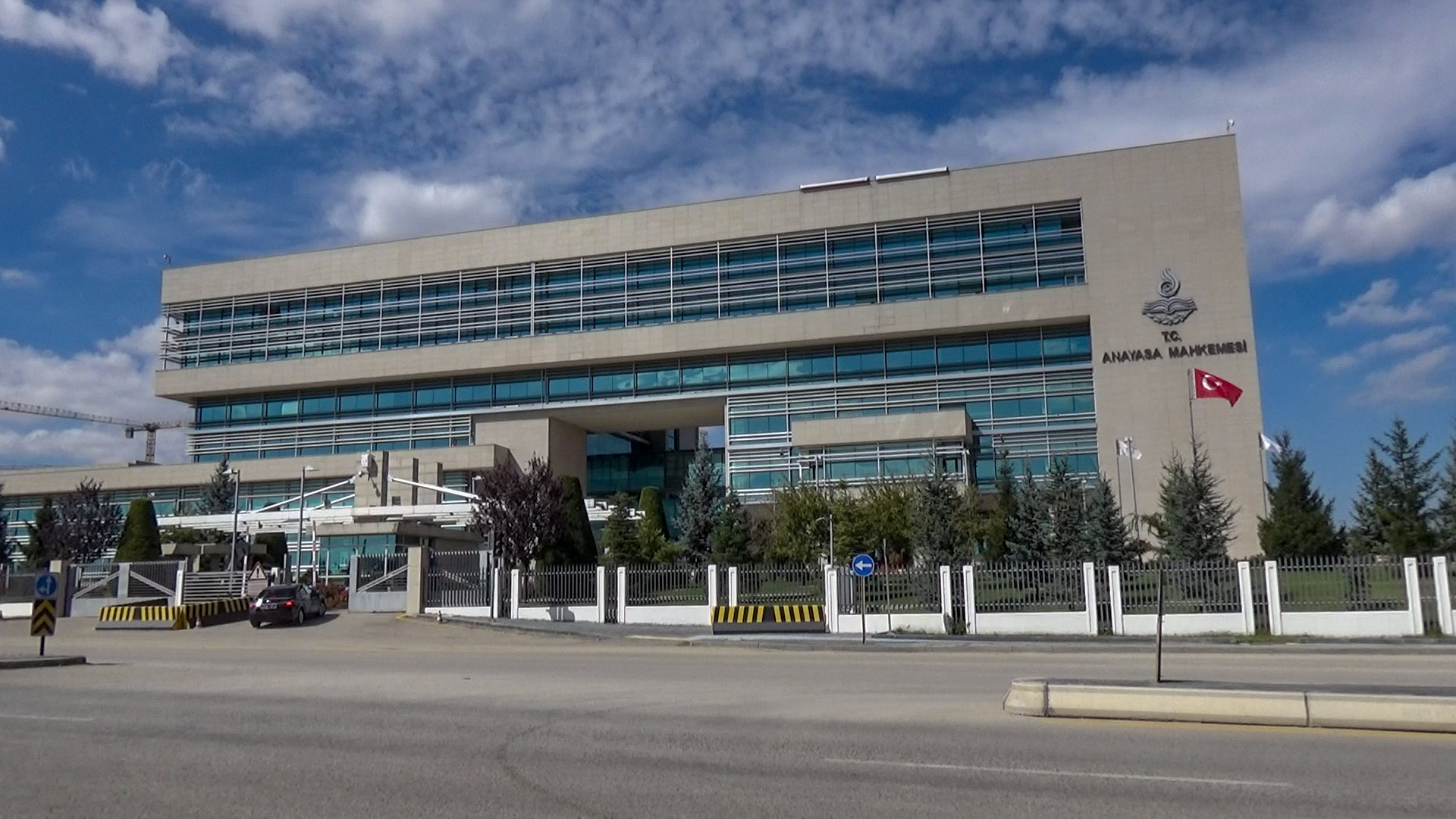
Constitutional Court of Turkey is placed in Ankara.

Besides the provisions establishing Turkey as a secular state, Article 10 goes further with regard to equality of its citizens by prohibiting any discrimination based on their "language, race, color, sex, political opinion, philosophical convictions or religious beliefs" and guaranteeing their equality in the eyes of the law. Borrowing from the French Revolutionary ideals of the nation and the Republic, Article 3 affirms that "The Turkish State, with its territory and nation, is an indivisible entity. Its language is Turkish". Article 66 defines a Turkish civic identity: "everyone bound to the Turkish state through the bond of citizenship is a Turk".

==== Freedom of expression ====
Article 26 establishes freedom of expression and Articles 27 and 28 the freedom of the press, while Articles 33 and 34 affirm the freedom of association and freedom of assembly, respectively.

==== Group rights ====
Classes are considered irrelevant in legal terms (A10). The Constitution affirms the right of workers to form labor unions "without obtaining permission" and "to possess the right to become a member of a union and to freely withdraw from membership" (A51). Articles 53 and 54 affirm the right of workers to bargain collectively and to strike, respectively.

=== Part three: Fundamental organs ===
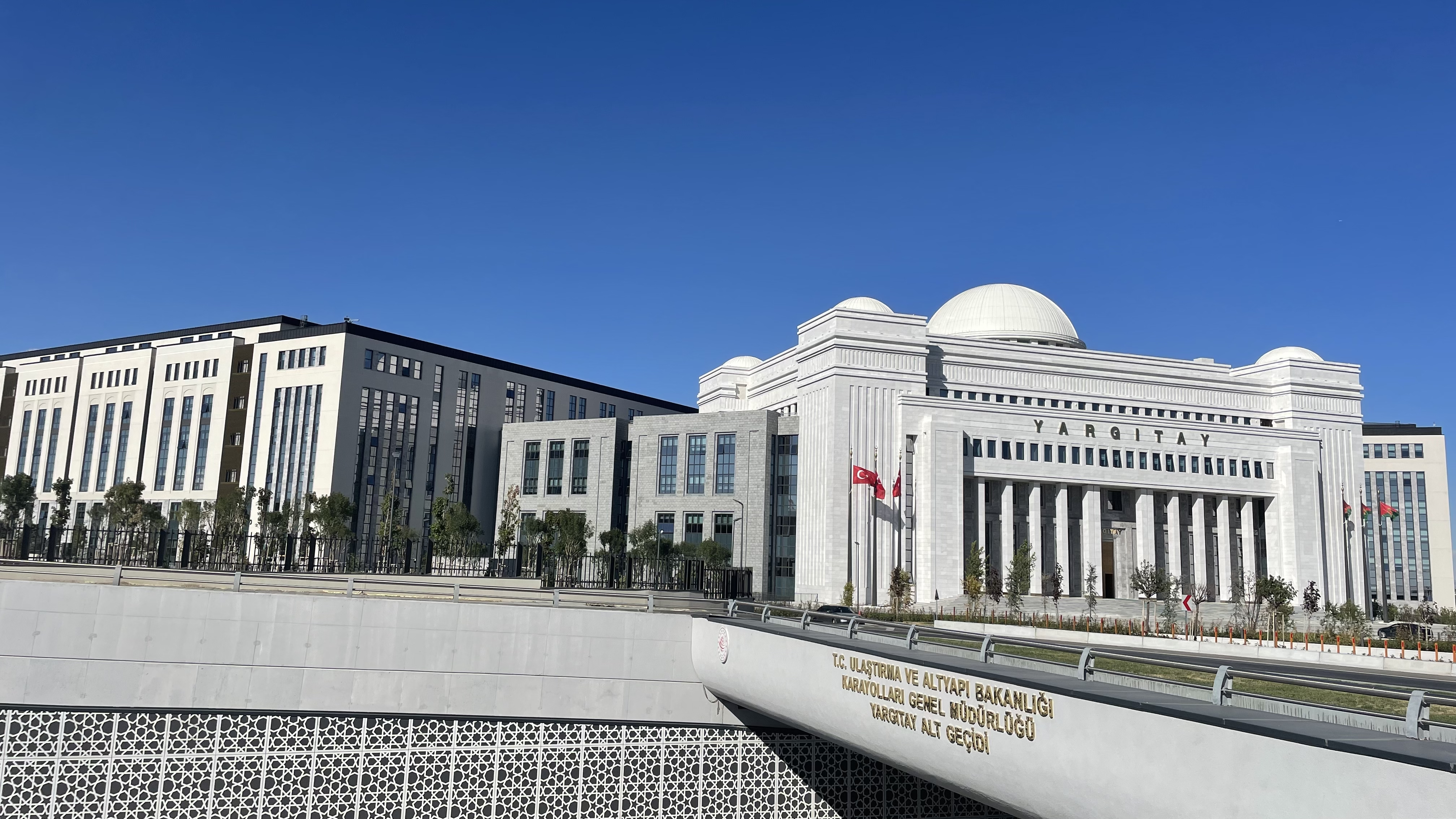
The Court of Cassation is the last instance for reviewing verdicts given by courts of criminal and civil justice in Turkey.

==== Legislative power ====
Article Seven provides for the establishment of a unicameral parliament as the sole organ of expression of sovereign people. Article Six of the Constitution affirms that "sovereignty is vested fully and unconditionally in the nation" and that "the Turkish Nation shall exercise its sovereignty through the authorised organs as prescribed by the principles laid down in the Constitution". The same article also rules out the delegation of sovereignty "to any individual, group or class" and affirms that "no person or agency shall exercise any state authority which does not emanate from the Constitution". Article 80 (A80) affirms the principle of national sovereignty: "members of the Turkish Grand National Assembly represent, not merely their own constituencies or constituents, but the Nation as a whole".

Part Three, Chapter One (Articles 75–100) sets the rules for the election and functioning of the Turkish Grand National Assembly as the legislative organ, as well as the conditions of eligibility (A76), parliamentary immunity (A83) and general legislative procedures to be followed. Per Articles 87 and 88, both the government and the parliament can propose laws, however it is only the parliament that has the power to enact laws (A87) and ratify treaties of the Republic with other sovereign states (A90).

The President of the Republic is elected by direct election and has an executive role as the Head of State, "representing the Republic of Turkey and the unity of the Turkish Nation" (A104). The President was elected by the parliament until 2007, and had a ceremonial role until 2017.

==== Judiciary ====
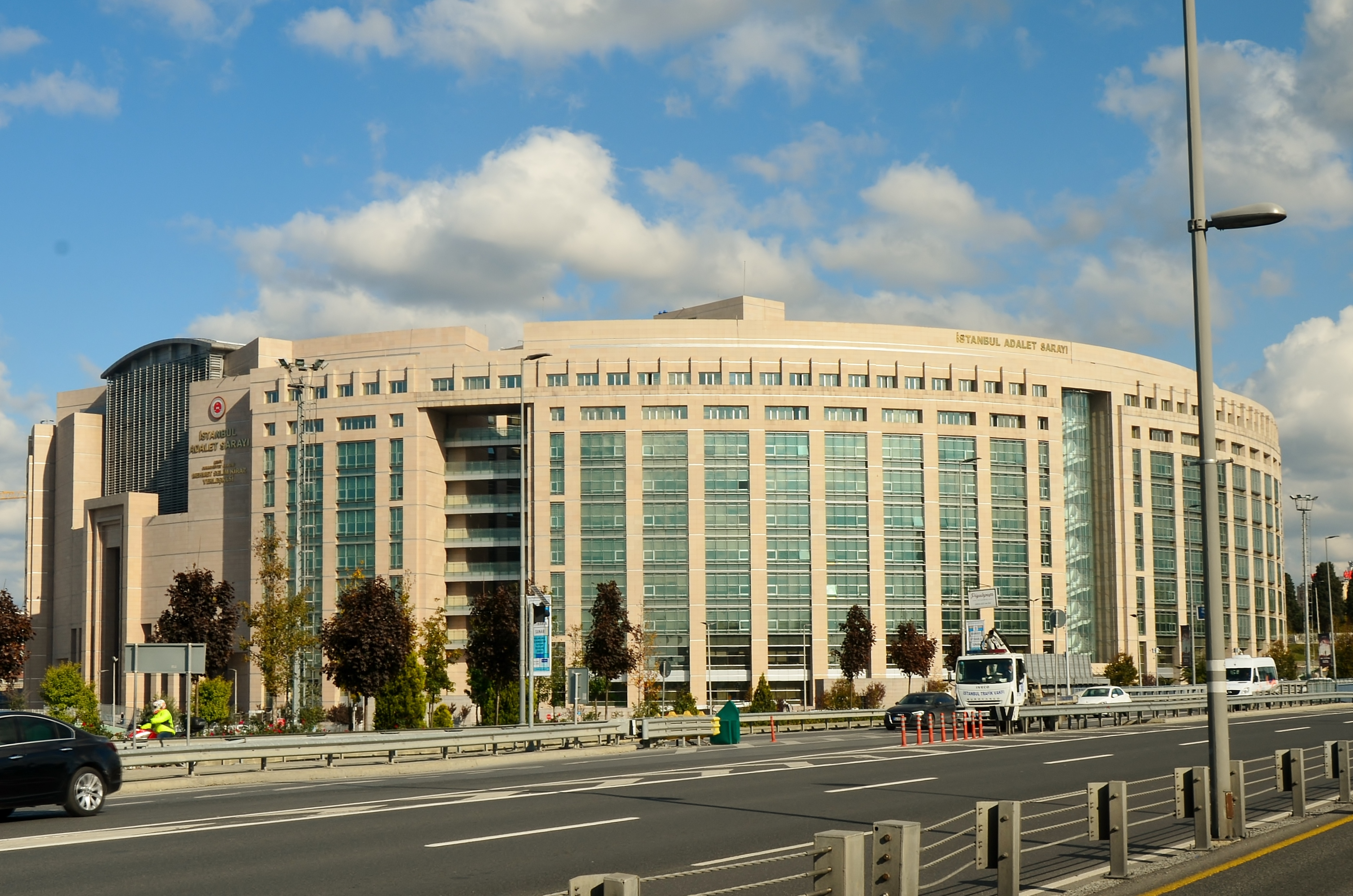
Istanbul Justice Palace is a courthouse in the Şişli district of Istanbul.

Article Nine affirms that the "judicial power shall be exercised by independent courts on behalf of the Turkish Nation". Part Four provides the rules relating to their functioning and guarantees their full independence (A137-140). The judiciary conforms to the principle of separation of powers not only through its independence from the executive and legislative branches of government but by being divided into two entities, Administrative Justice and Judicial Justice, with the Danıştay (The Council of State) the highest court for the former (A155) and Yargıtay (High Court of Appeals) the highest court for the latter (154).

Part Four, Section Two allows for a Constitutional Court that rules on the conformity of laws and governmental decrees to the Constitution. It may hear cases referred by the President of the Republic, the government, the members of Parliament (A150) or any judge before whom a constitutional issue has been raised by a defendant or a plaintiff (A152). The Constitutional Court has the right to both a priori and a posteriori review (respectively, before and after enactment), and can invalidate whole laws or decrees and ban their application for all future cases (A153).

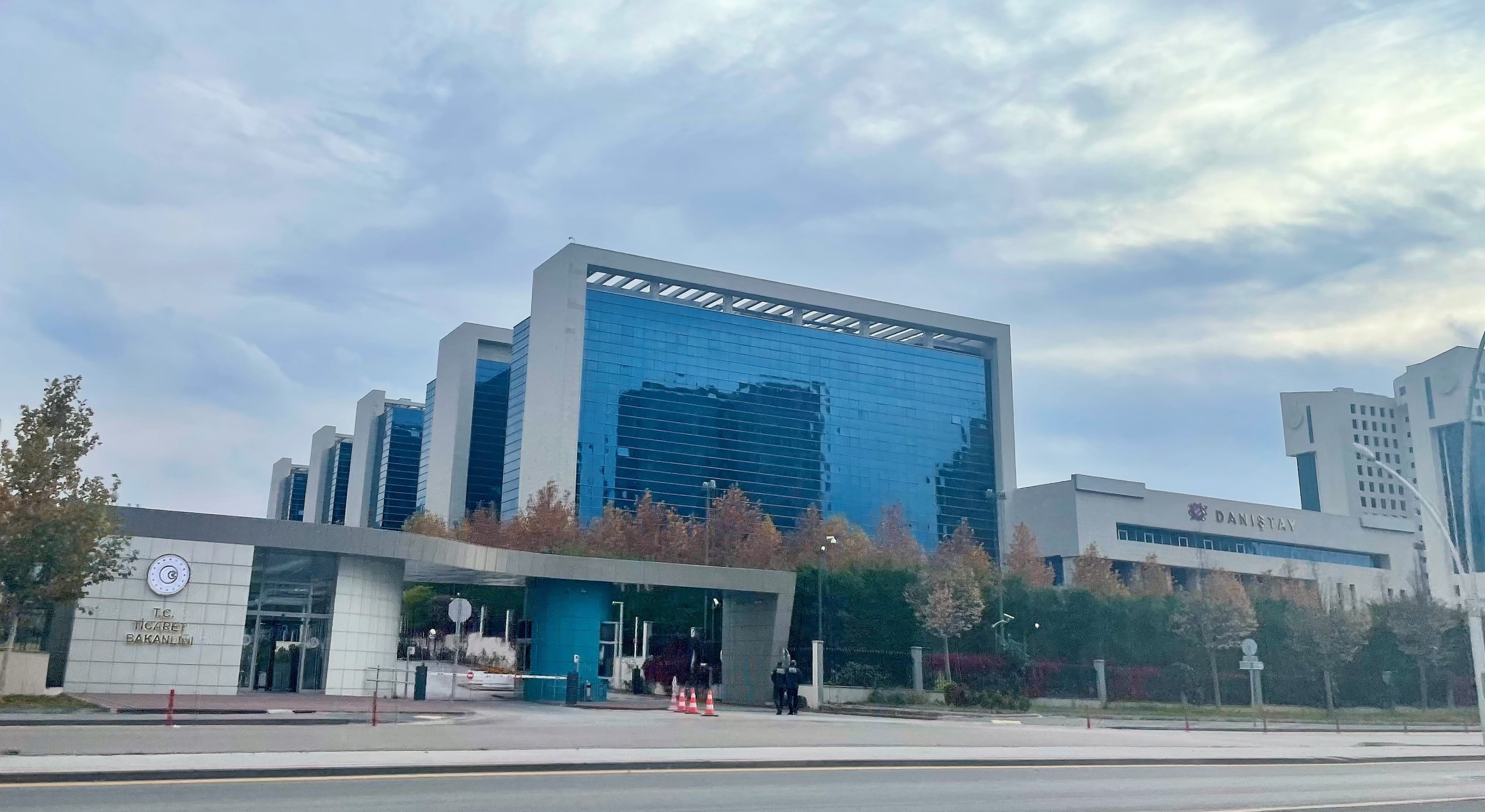
Council of State in Ankara

==== Executive ====
Per Article Eight, the executive power is vested in the President of the Republic and the Council of Ministers. Part Three, Chapter One, Section Two (Articles 109–116) lays out the rules for the confirmation and functioning of the executive, consisting of the President of the Republic and the Council of Ministers (A109). Executive power was shared between the Prime Minister and the Council of Ministers until 2017.

Part Three, Chapter Two, Section Four organizes the functioning of the central administration and certain important institutions of the Republic such as its universities (A130-132), local administrations (A127), fundamental public services (A128) and national security (A117-118). Article 123 stipulates that "the organisation and functions of the administration are based on the principles of centralization and local administration".

===== National security =====
The Turkish Armed Forces (TAF) are subordinate to the President, in the capacity of Commander-in-Chief. The Chief of General Staff of the TAF is responsible to the President in the exercise of his functions, and the latter is responsible, along with the rest of the Council of Ministers, before the parliament (A117).

National Security Council is an advisory organization, comprising the Chief of General Staff, the four main Commanders of the TAF, the President and select members of the Council of Ministers, to develop the "national security policy of the state" (A118).

=== Revision and amendments ===
In Article 175, it also sets out the procedure of its own revision and amendment by either referendum or a qualified majority vote of 2/3 in the National Assembly. It does not recognize the right to popular initiatives: Only the members of Parliament can propose modifications to the Constitution.

A revision of the Constitution was approved on September 13, 2010, by a 58 percent approval given by the 39 million people who voted. The change would allow the National Assembly to appoint a number of high-court judges, would reduce the power of the military court system over the civilian population and would improve human rights. The changes also remove the immunity from prosecution the former leaders of the early 1980s military coup gave themselves.

#	Date	Notes
1	17 May 1987	Voting age lowered from 21 to 19, Number of MPs raised from 400 to 450, Lifted 1980 ban on politicians, 1987 Turkish constitutional referendum
2	8 July 1993	Public radio and televisions allowed
3	23 July 1995	Voting age lowered from 19 to 18, Number of MPs raised from 450 to 550
4	18 June 1999	Appointment of civilian judges to State Security Courts in place of military judges
5	13 August 1999	Introduced privatization
6	3 October 2001	Changes in accordance with European Union acquis and European Convention on Human Rights
7	21 November 2001	Changes for rights and retirement of MPs
8	27 December 2002	Introduced interim elections
9	7 May 2004	Second changes made in accordance with European Union acquis
10	21 June 2005	Changes on election of Radio and Television Supreme Council members
11	29 October 2005	Changes on budget laws
12	13 October 2006	Age of candidacy lowered from 30 to 25
13	10 May 2007	Temporary law on independent politicians for 2007 elections
14	31 May 2007	Parliamentary term is lowered from 5 to 4, President would be elected with popular vote, 2007 Turkish constitutional referendum
15	9 February 2008	Changes for public office holders' usage of public services
16	7 May 2010	2010 Turkish constitutional referendum
17	17 March 2011	Arbitration on sports activities
18	20 May 2016	Reducing parliamentary immunity, especially for opposition and pro-Kurdish parties
19	21 January 2017	2017 Turkish constitutional referendum, introducing a presidential system and abolished the parliamentary system

== Critique ==
=== Ethnic rights ===
The Constitution of 1982 has been criticized as limiting individual cultural and political liberties in comparison with the previous constitution of 1961. Per the Treaty of Lausanne which established the Turkish Republic, legally, the only minorities are Greeks, Armenians and Jews, which also have certain privileges not recognized to other ethnic communities, per the treaty. According to the European Union, the constitution denies the fundamental rights of the Kurdish population because some articles, especially article 42, are against minority rights. The Council of Europe’s European Commission against Racism and Intolerance (ECRI) published its third report on Turkey in February 2005. The commission has taken the position that the parliament should revise Article 42 of the Constitution, which prohibits the teaching of any language other than Turkish as a first language in schools. The Turkish constitutional principle of not allowing the teaching of other languages as first languages in schools to its citizens, other than the official one is criticized by the EU, human rights organizations and minorities of Turkey. The Kurds, who comprise between 10 and 20% of the Turkish population are not allowed to get education in their mother tongue because of this article.

Currently Circassian, Kurdish, Zaza, Laz languages can be chosen as lessons in some public schools. Since 2003, private courses teaching minority languages can be offered, but the curriculum, appointment of teachers, and criteria for enrollment are subject to significant restrictions. All private Kurdish courses were closed down in 2005 because of bureaucratic barriers and the reluctance of Kurds to have to "pay to learn their mother tongue." In 2015, only 28 schools provided Kurdish language as a selective course. Also, neither private nor public schools are still allowed to use Kurdish language or other languages than Turkish as a first language.

=== Freedom of expression ===
The constitution grants freedom of expression, as declared in Article 26. Article 301 of the Turkish penal code states that "A person who publicly denigrates the Turkish Nation, the Republic or the Grand National Assembly of Turkey, shall be punishable by imprisonment of between six months and three years" and also that "Expressions of thought intended to criticise shall not constitute a crime".

Orhan Pamuk's remark "One million Armenians and 30,000 Kurds were killed in these lands, and nobody but me dares talk about it" was considered by some to be a violation of Article 10 of the Constitution and led to his trial in 2005. The complaint against Orhan Pamuk was made by a group of lawyers led by Kemal Kerinçsiz and charges filed by a district prosecutor under the Article 301 of the Turkish Penal Code. Pamuk was later released and charges annulled by the justice ministry on a technicality. The same group of lawyers have also filed complaints against other lesser-known authors on the same grounds. Kerinçsiz was indicted in the 2008 Ergenekon investigation, along with many others.

=== Influence of the military ===
Although modified several times in the last three decades, specifically within the framework of European Union reforms, the 1982 constitution is also criticised for giving the military too much influence in political affairs via the National Security Council. Turkish Armed Forces see themselves as the guardians of the secular and unitary nature of the Republic along with Atatürk's reforms and have intervened by taking over the government three times: in 1960, in 1971 and in 1980.

== See also ==
- Politics of Turkey
- 1982 Turkish constitutional referendum
- 2007 Turkish constitutional referendum
- 2010 Turkish constitutional referendum
- 2017 Turkish constitutional referendum
