= Northern Cyprus–Turkey relations =

- Northern Cyprus: Turkey

Diplomatic mission
- Embassy of Northern Cyprus, Ankara: Embassy of Turkey, North Nicosia

Northern Cyprus–Turkey relations are the political, economic and security ties between Turkey and Northern Cyprus (TRNC).

Turkey is the only United Nations member state that recognises the TRNC. The Republic of Cyprus remains the internationally recognised state of Cyprus, but its government has not controlled the northern part of the island since 1974. The Northern Cyprus–Turkey relationship encompasses financial transfers, trade, diplomatic representation, Turkish military forces stationed on the island and joint infrastructure projects. Turkey's support has been important to Northern Cyprus's administration and economy, but political differences have emerged over the Cyprus dispute, relations with the European Union and the degree of Turkish involvement in local affairs. Researchers have described a relationship marked by dependence on Ankara without necessarily implying agreement between the two leaderships on every issue.

== Historical background ==
=== 1960–1974 ===
The Republic of Cyprus became independent of the United Kingdom in August 1960. Under the new constitutional arrangement, Greek Cypriots and Turkish Cypriots shared government offices. Turkey, Greece and the United Kingdom signed the Treaty of Guarantee. The power-sharing system broke down amid intercommunal violence in 1963–1964, and Turkish Cypriots ceased to participate in most central government institutions. The United Nations Peacekeeping Force in Cyprus (UNFICYP) was deployed in 1964.

A coup against President Makarios III on 15 July 1974, backed by the military junta in Greece, was followed five days later by a response of landing of Turkish troops in Cyprus. Turkey invoked the Treaty of Guarantee and said that it was protecting Turkish Cypriots. After a second offensive in August, Turkish forces held more than one-third of the island. Large numbers of Greek Cypriots and Turkish Cypriots were displaced, and the division between the two parts of Cyprus became entrenched. Turkey maintains that its military action was lawful under its treaty obligations; the Republic of Cyprus regards the continuing Turkish military presence as an occupation.

=== Establishment of Northern Cyprus ===
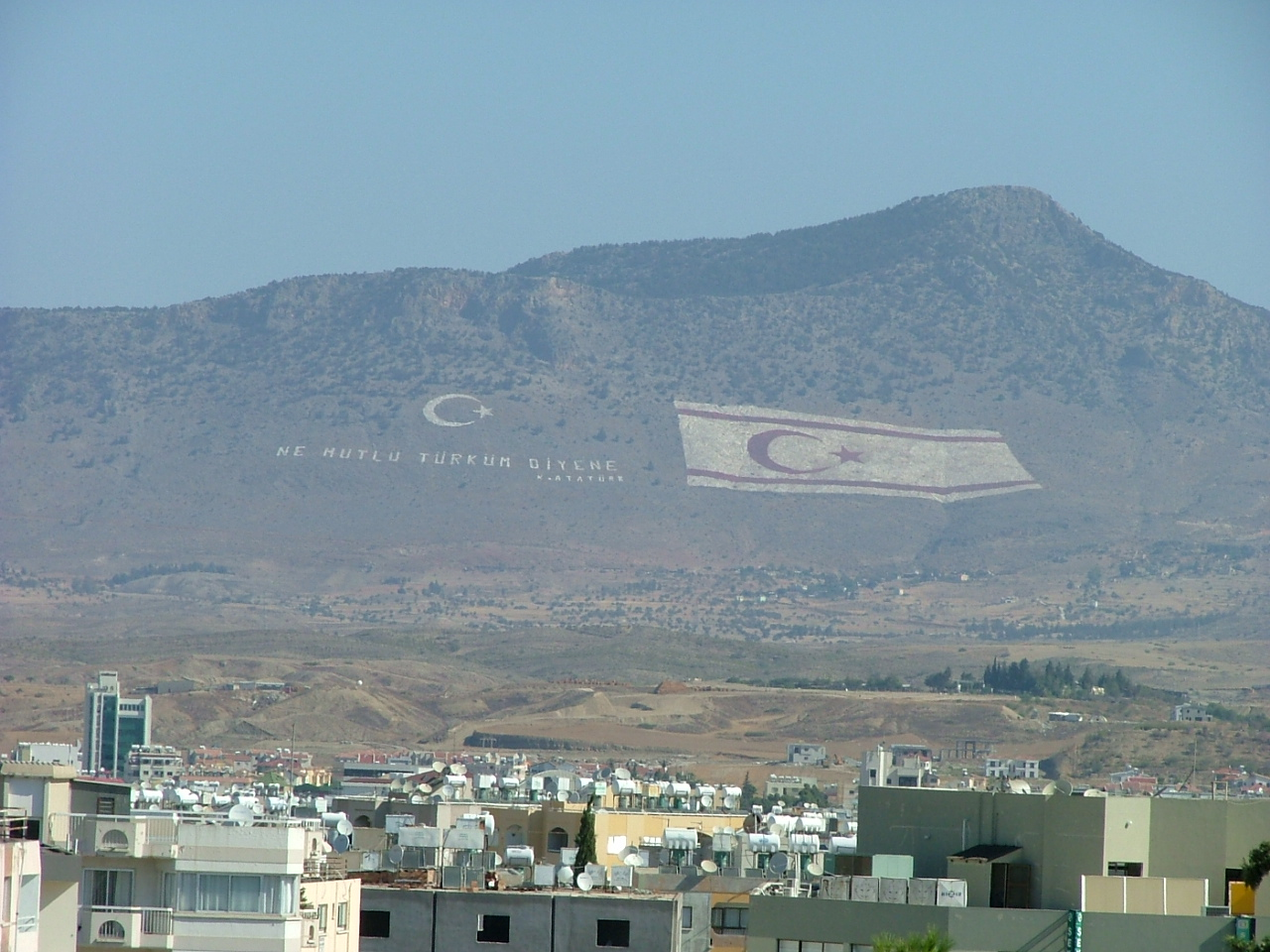
The flag of Northern Cyprus on the mountainside

The Turkish Cypriot leadership proclaimed the Turkish Federated State of Cyprus in February 1975. On 15 November 1983, under Rauf Denktaş, it announced the establishment of the TRNC, which Turkey recognised. Three days later, Security Council Resolution 541 declared the proclamation legally invalid. Resolution 550 of 11 May 1984 condemned subsequent secessionist measures, including the purported exchange of ambassadors between Ankara and the Turkish Cypriot leadership.

Northern Cyprus has its own legislature, government and elections. Turkey has nevertheless remained its principal military backer and the source of much of its external public financing. Formal arrangements for trade and other cooperation began before the 1983 declaration.

== Diplomatic relations ==
Turkey has an embassy in North Nicosia and a consulate-general in Famagusta. Northern Cyprus maintains an embassy in Ankara and consulates-general in Istanbul, İzmir and Mersin. These missions operate within Turkey's recognition of the TRNC; other UN member states do not recognise it as a sovereign state.

A trade and payments protocol was signed in 1975. On 6 August 1997, the two governments signed an agreement establishing an association council. Its remit included economic and financial cooperation, security, defence and foreign affairs. The agreement followed joint declarations made in January and July of that year. A March 1998 declaration set out the council's work and the governments' intention to deepen cooperation.

Turkey has supported Turkish Cypriot participation in international organisations. The Organization of Turkic States granted Northern Cyprus observer status in November 2022.

== Political relations and the Cyprus dispute ==
Turkey supported the UN-sponsored Annan Plan for a federal settlement of the Cyprus dispute. In referendums held on 24 April 2004, 64.9% of Turkish Cypriot voters approved the plan, while 75.8% of Greek Cypriot voters rejected it. The proposal therefore did not take effect. The Republic of Cyprus entered the European Union on 1 May, EU law was suspended in the northern areas not controlled by the republic's government.

UN-sponsored talks at Crans-Montana ended without an agreement in July 2017. Turkey later adopted a position favouring two sovereign states on the island instead of a bizonal, bicommunal federation. Ersin Tatar, elected Turkish Cypriot president in 2020, endorsed the two-state approach. His predecessor, Mustafa Akıncı, had argued for a federal settlement. Accounts of the 2020 election also raised questions about Ankara's involvement in the campaign.

The October 2025 presidential election brought Tufan Erhürman to office. He defeated Tatar with 62.8% of the vote and called for the resumption of negotiations over a federal arrangement. Recep Tayyip Erdoğan congratulated him after the election. Erhürman subsequently said that foreign-policy decisions would continue to be coordinated with Turkey, even as he advocated a different approach to a Cyprus settlement.

== Military and security cooperation ==
Turkish troops have been stationed in Northern Cyprus since 1974. Their number is disputed; the Polish Centre for Eastern Studies estimated the contingent at about 40,000 in October 2025. Turkey and the Turkish Cypriot authorities defend the deployment as necessary for Turkish Cypriot security.

The 1997 association agreement included security and defence among the areas for cooperation. According to the European Commission's 2026 report on Turkey, Turkish authorities had further upgraded a drone base at Lefkoniko and a naval base at Boğaz. The status of Turkish forces and the future of the 1960 guarantee arrangements have been recurring subjects in settlement negotiations.

== Economic relations ==
=== Financial assistance and public policy ===
Turkish financial assistance is an established part of the Northern Cypriot budget. It is provided through agreements covering grants, loans, infrastructure projects and conditions for public-sector spending. The terms have been contested in Northern Cyprus, notably when proposed economic reforms have met opposition from unions and local officials.

In April 2026, Turkish vice-president Cevdet Yılmaz and Turkish Cypriot prime minister Ünal Üstel signed another annual economic and financial cooperation protocol. The Cyprus Mail reported its value as €480 million approximately, with funding earmarked for hospitals and other infrastructure. A similar protocol had been agreed in March 2025.

=== Currency, trade and transport ===
The Turkish lira circulates in Northern Cyprus. Inflation and exchange-rate changes in Turkey consequently affect prices and purchasing power in the north. Turkey is an important source of imports and a market for Turkish Cypriot businesses. Without direct trade arrangements with most countries, exporters use routes involving Turkey or the Republic of Cyprus; a 2026 study by Mustafa Çıraklı and Murat Tüzünkan examined the limitations of both.

In 1994, the European Court of Justice ruled on the acceptance of origin and plant-health certificates issued by authorities in Northern Cyprus, a decision that restricted direct exports to the European Community. Trade through Turkey became one route used by northern Cypriot producers. Passenger flights from Ercan International Airport operate via Turkey rather than directly to other countries.

== Infrastructure and energy ==
=== Water supply ===
The Northern Cyprus Water Supply Project opened on 17 October 2015. Its pipeline runs for approximately 107 kilometres between southern Turkey and northern Cyprus, including an 80-kilometre section crossing the Mediterranean. Built to carry up to 75 million cubic metres of fresh water annually, it supplies water for domestic use and irrigation.

The project's management was contested after construction. Municipalities in Northern Cyprus resisted plans that would transfer control of water distribution away from local authorities. In a study of the dispute, geographer Michael Mason described the pipeline as a form of 'hydraulic patronage', linking the provision of water to questions of political and economic control.

=== Energy connections ===
On 10 July 2026, Turkey and the Turkish Cypriot administration signed a memorandum of understanding for a proposed natural gas connection. Turkish energy minister Alparslan Bayraktar described a pipeline approximately 101 kilometres long, of which 97 kilometres would be underwater. The natural gas line was still a proposal; an electricity interconnector had also been discussed.

== Social and cultural ties ==
Turkish is spoken in both countries, and the two populations have family, educational and cultural links. Settlement from mainland Turkey after 1974 changed the north's population; migration, citizenship and property rights subsequently became contentious matters in discussions of the Cyprus dispute. Turkish Cypriot political parties and civic organisations have also differed over Ankara's influence on local institutions.

An education dispute drew several thousand demonstrators onto the streets of North Nicosia on 2 May 2025. Protesters opposed a rule allowing headscarves in secondary schools; organisers said it reflected Turkish government influence over the education system. Supporters of the rule defended it on grounds of religious freedom. The demonstrations followed other disagreements over secularism and public policy in Northern Cyprus.

== See also ==
- Foreign relations of Northern Cyprus
- Foreign relations of Turkey
- Cyprus–Turkey relations
- Cyprus dispute
- Cyprus Turkish Peace Force Command
