= Embassy of Turkey, North Nicosia =

Diplomatic mission of the Republic of Turkey to the Turkish Republic of Northern Cyprus

Ambassador of Turkey to Northern Cyprus
- Incumbent; Metin Feyzioğlu since 28 November 2022
- Ministry of Foreign Affairs
- Style: Mister or Madam Ambassador (informal); His or Her Excellency (diplomatic)
- Appointer: President of Turkey
- Term length: No fixed term
- Website: lefkosa.be.mfa.gov.tr

The Embassy of Turkey in North Nicosia is the sole embassy in Northern Cyprus as the rest of the international community locate their embassies to the Cyprus island in the Republic of Cyprus. The island is divided between four sides; the unrecognised Turkish Republic of Northern Cyprus to the north, the internationally recognised Republic of Cyprus to the south, the United Nations buffer zone separating the two, and the British overseas territories of Akrotiri and Dhekelia. The Turkish Republic of Northern Cyprus is only recognised by Turkey, therefore its embassy is in the capital North Nicosia. Turkey does not recognise the Republic of Cyprus. The incumbent ambassador is Metin Feyzioğlu since 28 November 2022.

== History ==
In June 1925, Consulate of Turkey to Cyprus (Turkish: Türkiye Şehbenderliği) opened in Larnaca. It was connected to Turkish Embassy in London. The consulate then moved to Nicosia in 1939. The new building was reflecting the traditional Turkish Cypriot architecture. After signing of the Zurich and London Treaties, the consulate in Nicosia became an embassy in 1960. Following the Turkish invasion of Cyprus, the embassy became very close to the UN Buffer Zone. It moved to a location across from the Turkish Northern Cyprus Parliament Building in 1978. The chancery and the residence are still located in the same place.

== Sub-divisions ==
The embassy has several sub-divisions for different purposes. These include a military attaché and a press office. There are also consultancy offices for labor, social security, religious services, education, customs, treasury, finance and commercial activities. Yunus Emre Cultural Center which opened in 2015 also makes activities in the culture field.

== List of ambassadors ==
- İnal Batu, 1979-1984
- Bedrettin Tunabaş, 1984-1987
- Ertuğrul Kumcuoğlu, 1987-1991
- Cahit Bayar, 1991-1995
- Aydan Karahan, 1995-1996
- Ertuğrul Apakan, 1996-2000
- Hayati Güven, 2000-2004
- Aydan Karahan, 2004-2006
- Türkekul Kurttekin, 2006-2008
- Şakir Fakılı, 2009-2010
- Kaya Türkmen, 2010-2011
- Halil İbrahim Akça, 2011-2015
- Derya Kanbay, 2015-2018
- Ali Murat Başçeri, 2018-2022
- Metin Feyzioğlu, 2022-2025
- Ali Murat Başçeri, 2025 -

== See also ==
- Embassy of Northern Cyprus in Ankara
- List of diplomatic missions of Turkey
