= Nuri Abaç =

Turkish Painter

- Born: 1926; Istanbul, Turkey
- Died: March 2, 2008 (aged 81–82); Ankara, Turkey
- Education: State Academy of Fine Arts (DGSA)
- Known for: Painting, Architecture
- Movement: Fantastic realism, Surrealism, Modern Turkish Painting
- Relatives: Celal Abaç (father); Sadi Abaç (uncle); Selçuk Abaç (cousin)
- Awards: State Painting and Sculpture Award (1981, 1986); Alexandria Biennial Prize (1982)

Nuri Abaç (1926 – March 2, 2008) was a Turkish painter and architect recognized as a pioneer of Surrealism and Fantastic Realism in Turkey and one of the most significant architect-painters in 20th-century Turkish art. His work is known for a unique and original blend of Anatolian archaeological motifs, Ottoman miniature aesthetics, and the Karagöz shadow play, presented with a satirical or surreal lens.

== Early life and family ==
Nuri Abaç was born in 1926 in Istanbul. His father, Mahmut Celalettin (Celal Abaç), was a founding set designer and decorator for the Istanbul City Theatre (Darülbedayi). In 1931, following the establishment of the Community Centers (Halkevleri), the family moved to Mersin, where Celal Abaç became a central figure in the city's burgeoning cultural and theatrical life.

Growing up in a household immersed in theater culture, Nuri and his brother Sudi Abaç assisted their father in painting stage decors. This early exposure to the "curtain" and "stage" composition has significantly influenced his later paintings. He completed his primary and secondary education in Mersin and graduated from Adana High School in 1944.

== Education ==
Abaç entered the State Academy of Fine Arts (DGSA) in 1944. His true passion lay in the painting atelier of Léopold Lévy, but due to paternal pressure for a stable profession, he enrolled in the Department of Architecture. Nevertheless, he remained an active student in Lévy’s workshop, where he developed a foundation in academic landscape and figure painting.

He graduated as an architect in 1950, beginning a dual career that would last decades. He worked as an architect for the State Water Works (DSİ) and later the State Planning Organization (DPT) in Ankara, from which he retired in 1985.

== Artistic evolution ==
=== Early Period and Surrealism (1950–1960) ===
His early works were largely academic, focusing on landscapes and still lifes under Lévy's influence. By the late 1950s, he transitioned toward Surrealism and "fantastic-grotesque" styles, influenced by his architectural background and an interest in the subconscious.

=== Anatolian Civilizations (1960–1975) ===
Abaç began exploring the cultural heritage of Anatolia, integrating motifs from Hittite, Sumerian, and Seljuk art. His paintings from this era frequently featured mythological creatures like the double-headed eagle and the Simurgh, rendered with heavy, sculptural lines reflective of his architectural training.

=== Karagöz and Social Life (Post-1975) ===
Abaç's most celebrated phase began in 1975, following a stylistic shift toward traditional Turkish arts, particularly the Karagöz shadow play.

His artistic approach during this period was characterized by a schematic, two-dimensional structure that discarded Western perspective in favor of vertical layering, a technique that mimicked the "curtain" or screen of the Karagöz shadow theatre. Within this framework, his iconography frequently featured nostalgic urban scenes and coffeehouses, with a specific fixation on "nostalgic steamboats" (vapurlar), trains, and zeppelins.

Furthermore, he represented the human figure through rhythmic, curved lines and large, expressive eyes, utilizing these stylizations to either satirize various social types or celebrate the vibrancy of communal life.

== Teaching and collective work ==
Abaç was a founding member of the United Painters and Sculptors Association (Birleşmiş Ressamlar ve Heykeltıraşlar Derneği) in 1969, which sought to decentralize the Istanbul-centric art scene and support artists in Ankara. After his retirement, he taught perspective and fine arts at Hacettepe University and Bilkent University.

== Major awards ==
- 1958: Tehran Biennial Prize
- 1975: DYO Painting Competition Honor Award
- 1981: 42nd State Painting and Sculpture Exhibition Award
- 1982: 14th Alexandria Biennial Third Prize (Bronze Medal)
- 1986: 47th State Painting and Sculpture Exhibition Award
- 2002: Contemporary Arts Foundation (ÇAGSAV) Honorary Award

== Personal life ==
Abaç lived a modest life in Ankara, focusing intensely on his workshop after his retirement from civil service. He was married to Suna Abaç and had a son, Celal. He passed away on March 2, 2008.

== Bibliography ==
- Akdoğan Özülkü, G. (2019). Türk Resminde “Nuri Abaç ve Sosyal Yaşam Kurgusu". Akdeniz University.
- Laçin, M. (2020). Nuri Abaç'ın 1975 Sonrası Resimlerinde Esin Kaynağı Olarak Karagöz Gölge Oyunu. Bursa Uludağ University.
- Metin, H. (2018). Mersin'in Kent Kimliğinin Oluşumunda Celal Abaç ve Ailesi: 1930-1945 Yılları. Mersin University.
- Sönmez, H. (2019). "Mimar Ressamlarımız; Cihat Burak, Nuri Abaç, Ruzin Gerçin, Erol Akyavaş". Social Research and Behavioral Sciences.
