= Cüneyd Düzyol =

Turkish academic (born 1964)

Mustafa Cüneyd Düzyol

Minister of Development
- In office 22 September 2015 – 17 November 2015
- Prime Minister: Ahmet Davutoğlu
- Preceded by: Müslüm Doğan
- Succeeded by: Cevdet Yılmaz

Undersecretary to the Development Ministry
- In office 2 December 2014 – 22 September 2015
- Minister: Cevdet Yılmaz; Müslüm Doğan
- Preceded by: Kemal Madenoğlu

Personal details
- Born: 1964 (age 61–62) İzmir, Turkey
- Party: Independent
- Education: Middle East Technical University (BS); University of East Anglia (MS); University of Illinois (MS)
- Occupation: Academic; civil servant
- Cabinet: 63rd

Mustafa Cüneyd Düzyol (born 1964) is a Turkish academic and civil servant who served as the Minister of Development in the interim election government led by Prime Minister Ahmet Davutoğlu between 22 September and 17 November 2015. He took over from Müslüm Doğan after his resignation and served during the November 2015 general election. He was, as required by the Turkish Constitution, of no political affiliation. Before being appointed as the Minister responsible, he served as the Undersecretary to the Development Ministry from 2 December 2014 until his appointment to the cabinet on 22 September 2015.

== Early life and career ==
Mustafa Cüneyd Düzyol was born in 1964 in İzmir. He graduated from Middle East Technical University Faculty of Civil Engineering in 1988. After briefly working in the private sector as a design engineer, he began working for the State Planning Organisation (DTP). He became an expert assistant in 1989. In 1992, he travelled to the United Kingdom to pursue a master's in development economy at the University of East Anglia. A year later in 1993, he became a planning expert. Between 1995 and 1996, he studied at the University of Illinois at Urbana–Champaign in the United States and obtained an MS in economics.

=== Bureaucratic career ===
In 1996, Düzyol was appointed an expert educator at the General Directorate of Economic Sectors and Co-ordination as well as the Projects, Investment Assessment and Analysis Department. In 1999, he became the Department manager and served until 2002. Between 2003 and 2009, he became the General Director of Economic Sectors and Co-ordination. He was appointed as a Deputy Undersecretary in 2009 and became the Undersecretary to the Ministry of Development on 2 December 2014, having served as deputy until October 2014.

== Minister of Development ==
The general election held in June 2015 resulted in a hung parliament, with coalition negotiations eventually proving unsuccessful. As a result, President Recep Tayyip Erdoğan called a snap election for November 2015, thereby necessitating the formation of an interim election government as required by the Turkish Constitution. The interim election government, the first in Turkish history, was formed by Prime Minister Ahmet Davutoğlu, who sent out invitations to politicians from all parties to take part. Apart from Davutoğlu's Justice and Development Party (AKP), only the Peoples' Democratic Party (HDP) opted to take part, while the Republican People's Party (CHP) and the Nationalist Movement Party (MHP) declined their invitations.

Just under a month after taking office, both the HDP ministers taking part in the government resigned, leaving the positions of European Affairs Minister and Development Minister vacant. Düzyol was subsequently appointed as the Minister of Development, succeeding HDP Member of Parliament Müslüm Doğan. As required by the Constitution, he is independent of any political party.

== See also ==
- List of Turkish civil servants
