= List of ambassadors of Turkey to Northern Cyprus =

The list of ambassadors of Turkey to Northern Cyprus provides a chronological record of individuals who have served as the diplomatic representatives of the Republic of Turkey to the Turkish Republic of Northern Cyprus.

The diplomatic relationship between Turkey and the Turkish Republic of Northern Cyprus (TRNC) has been significant since the establishment of the TRNC in 1983. As a result, Turkey has maintained a consistent presence in TRNC through its embassy and appointed various ambassadors to represent its interests in the region.

== List of ambassadors ==
| Ambassador | Term start | Term end | Ref. |
|---|---|---|---|
| İnal Batu | 15 November 1983 | 1 January 1984 | |
| Bedrettin Tunabaş | 1 January 1984 | 1 January 1987 | |
| Ertuğrul Kumcuoğlu | 1 January 1987 | 19 August 1991 | |
| Cahit Bayar | 1 September 1991 | 31 May 1995 | |
| Aydan Karahan | 16 June 1995 | 1 October 1996 | |
| Ertuğrul Apakan | 1 October 1996 | 29 November 2000 | |
| Hayati Güven | 1 December 2000 | 1 December 2004 | |
| Aydan Karahan | 3 December 2004 | 30 November 2006 | |
| Türkekul Kurttekin | 15 December 2006 | 29 December 2008 | |
| Şakir Fakılı | 9 February 2009 | 22 July 2010 | |
| Kaya Türkmen | 1 August 2010 | 17 March 2011 | |
| Halil İbrahim Akça | 1 April 2011 | 24 July 2015 | |
| Derya Kanbay | 28 July 2015 | 30 October 2018 | |
| Ali Murat Başçeri | 1 November 2018 | 23 November 2022 | |
| Metin Feyzioğlu | 28 November 2022 | Incumbent | |

== See also ==
- Embassy of Turkey, North Nicosia
