= Nureddin Nebati =

Turkish politician (born 1964)

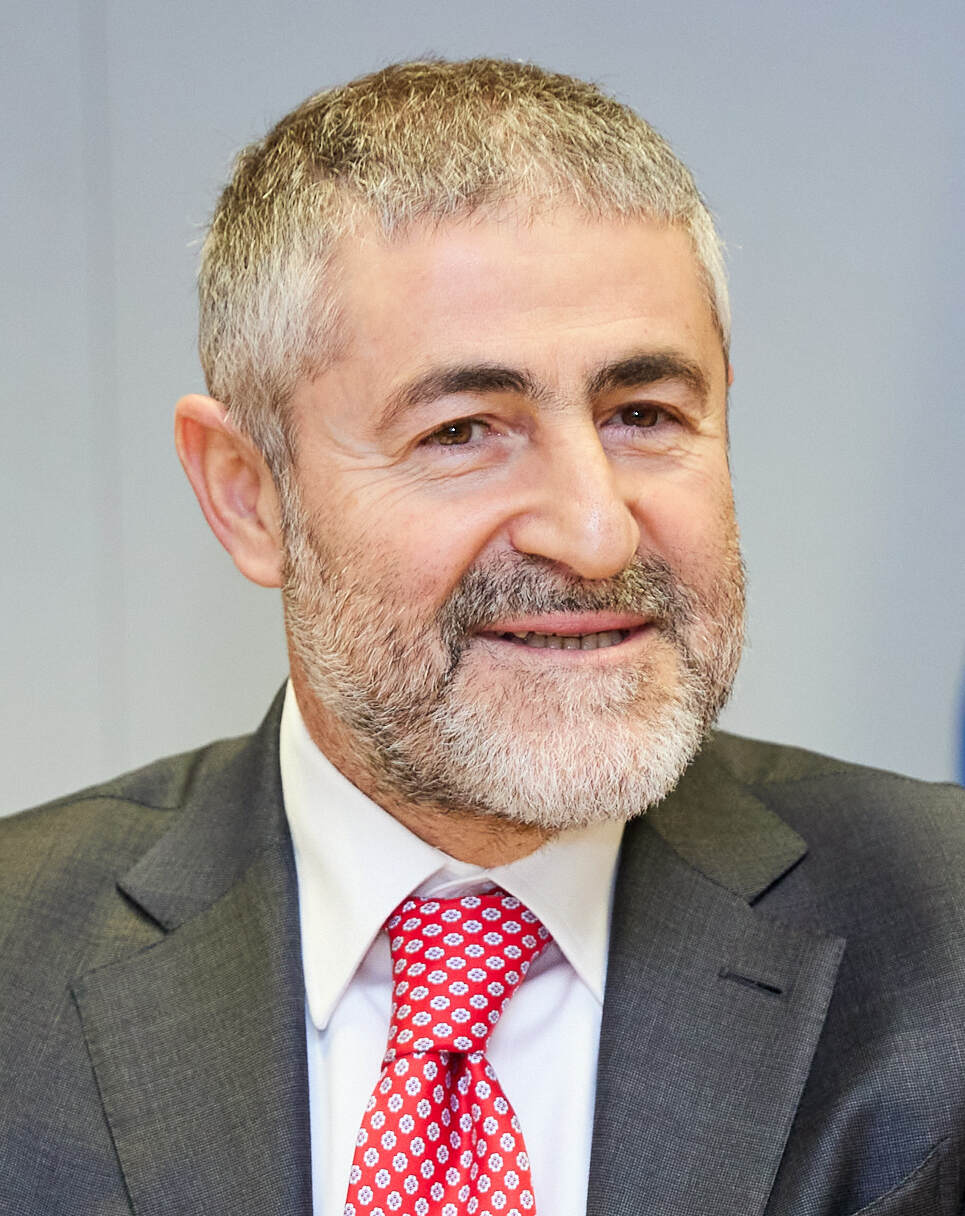

Minister of Treasury and Finance
- In office 2 December 2021 – 3 June 2023
- President: Recep Tayyip Erdoğan
- Preceded by: Lütfi Elvan
- Succeeded by: Mehmet Şimşek

Member of the Grand National Assembly
- Incumbent
- Assumed office 2 June 2023
- Constituency: Mersin (2023)
- In office 28 June 2011 – 10 July 2018
- Constituency: İstanbul (III) (2011, November 2015); Şanlıurfa (June 2015)

Personal details
- Born: 1 January 1964 (age 62) Viranşehir, Şanlıurfa Province, Turkey
- Party: Justice and Development Party
- Spouse: Özlem Nebati
- Children: 4
- Education: Istanbul University; Kocaeli University
- Profession: Politician, businessman

Nureddin Nebati (born 1 January 1964), is a Turkish politician anf businessman of the of Justice and Development Party who served as the Minister of Treasury and Finance of Turkey from December 2021 to June 2023. He has been a member of the Grand National Assembly for Mersin since 2023, having previously representing Istanbul and Şanlıurfa between 2011 and 2018. He was deputy Minister of Treasury and Finance from 2018 to 2021. Born in Viranşehir, Nebati holds a doctorate in political science and public administration and has background in the textile and children's clothing business.

He was appointed minister by Recep Tayyip Erdoğan after Lütfi Elvan resigned during a sharp fall in the value of the Turkish Lira. His tenure coincided with the government's policy of cutting interests rates despite high inflation, as he described as a shift away from orthodox economic policy. The policy was criticized by opposition politicians and economists and some of his public remarks became the subject of ridicule in Turkey. He was succeeded by Mehmet Şimşek in June 2023.

== Early life and education ==
Nebati is of Arab origin, belonging to the tribe of Na'im. He was born to Süleyman and Emine Nebati and on 1 January 1964 in Viranşehir, a district of Şanlıurfa Province. He majored in political science and public administration at Istanbul University. Later, he completed his postgraduate education on international relations at Istanbul University's Social Science Department. Nebati has a doctorate degree from Kocaeli University.

== Career ==
=== Business ===
Nebati worked in the textile and clothing sector including children's clothing business operating in Turkey and abroad.

=== Party and parliamentary career ===
Nebati was elected for the central executive board of the AKP at the party's fourth ordinary congress. In 2014-2015 he served on its central decision and executive board, as head of financial and administrative affairs and as a deputy chairman of the party. He was elected for the Grand National Assembly for Istanbul in the 2011 general election for Şanlıurfa in June 2015, and again for Istanbul in the November 2015 election.

=== Deputy Minister of Treasury and Finance ===
Nebati served as Deputy Minister of Treasury and Finance from 2018 until his promotion in 2021 under Berat Albayrak and then Lütfi Elvan. In this role he held consultation meetings with business representatives from different cities, and occasionally stood in for Albayrak in meetings with foreign investors.

=== Minister of Treasury and Finance ===
Nebati was appointed Minister of Treasury and Finance by presidential decision on 2 December 2021, after Lütfi Elvan ask to be relieved from this position. His appointment cams as the Turkish Lira lost almost 40% of its value since the year began, following a series of interest rates cuts that Erdoğan supported despite rising inflation. Nebati said on his appointment that high interest rates would not be a priority and earlier said that there was "no problem" with keeping rates low.

In early 2022 he described the governments approach as heterodox rather than orthodox and forecast that inflation would peak in January before falling to single digits ahead of the 2023 elections. Inflation continued to rise, officials put it at 36% in December 2021, while the independent ENAG group of academics put it at 83%. His government also promoted a scheme under which the government compensated holders of Lire deposits for depreciation against foreign currencies, which Nebati said was attracting strong demand.

Nebati's public statements drew considerable attention. In a television interview in December 2021 he declined to give figures on a currency stabilization initiative and said that the economy was reflected in people's eyes, remarks that were widely mocked on social media. Critics, including Good Party (IYI party) leader Meral Akşener, dubbed him the "Nebati Comet". Reuters reported that some in government were concerned about his performance, while an unnamed official defended him. Business contacts described him as an extrovert with little direct economic training. He left the ministry on 3 June 2023 and was succeeded by Mehmet Şimşek.

=== Return to parliament ===
Nebati was an AKP candidate in Mersin in the 2023 general election and was elected taking his seat in 2 June 2023.

== Personal life ==
Nebati is married and has 4 children. He has also supported various NGO's, namely İlim Yayma Cemiyeti, Ensar Vakfı and TÜGVA.

Political offices
Preceded by Lütfi Elvan	Ministry of Treasury and Finance; 2 December 2021 – 3 June 2023	Succeeded by Mehmet Şimşek
