= Association of Judicial Unity =

Largest association of judges and public prosecutors in Turkey

- Formation: March 27, 2015; 11 years ago
- Location: Cinnah Caddesi Piyade Sokak No 13 ÇANKAYA / ANKARA
- Members: 4154 members
- Secretary General: Dr. Marshall
- Leader: İlhan AYAZ; Harun KODALAK; Ayhan AKYÜREK
- Website: https://www.ybd.org.tr

Association of Judicial Unity (Turkish: Yargıda Birlik Derneği, abbreviated as YBD [jbd̪]) is the largest association of judges and public prosecutors in Turkey. YBD's origins date back to the Platform of the Judicial Unity created in 2014 by judges and prosecutors from all political horizons, philosophical convictions and religious beliefs. It has around ten thousand members.

== History ==
Founded in 2014 by members of the judiciary concerned about the future of the judicial system in Turkey, the Platform of the Judicial Unity evolved to become the Association of Judicial Unity on March 27, 2015. The members of YBD take duty of protecting the independence and impartiality of the judiciary and preserving public trust by taking a stance equidistant from all kinds of political opinions, philosophical or religious beliefs and convictions.

YBD obtained the legal status as an association on March 27, 2015. Its first General Assembly meeting was held on September 12, 2015.

== Aims and vision ==
According to the Charter, YBD's objectives and principles can be summarized as follows;

The Rule of Law, which is one of the fundamental values of modern democracy, will only be possible with a strong judicial power. Such a strong judicial power requires ensuring the independence, impartiality and accountability of the judiciary. In this connection, independence of the judiciary, which is a prerequisite for the rule of law, serves as a guarantee for the right to a fair trial and also as a fundamental guarantee of a democratic society. The notion of independence, which finds its meaning in the Constitution and which is also mentioned in the international instruments, makes it essential that one acts in accordance with the Constitution and the laws and only and solely on his/her personal conviction and that no adherence to any other person, institution or formation is allowed. Independence from the public opinion and non-judicial government institutions must be ensured and maintained. Independence must be secured within the judiciary as well.

The notion of impartiality refers to the necessity that members of the judiciary must, in compliance with the law without any influence during the decision-making processes, adopt an equitable approach to parties. Accordingly, it is incumbent on the State to enable the execution of judicial activities without any inherent fear or distress, and judges and prosecutors have also their share of responsibility in this regard. Another issue of importance as for a democratic rule of law is the accountability and transparency. Independence and impartiality could develop into an identity, which is in conformity with democracy, only through the mechanisms of accountability.

The main character of this formation consists of a participatory approach and an understanding of taking a stance equidistant to all kinds of political opinions, philosophical or religious beliefs and convictions. The pre-eminence of the rights and the rule of law are the indispensable aims pursued by YBD. The members of YBD undertake to make efforts in order to maintain this structure, and to observe the independence and impartiality of the judiciary as well as the tenure of judges.

YBD conducts its works by taking the following instruments as basis: the Constitution of the Republic of Turkey, the European Convention on Human Rights, the United Nations Basic Principles on the Independence of the Judiciary, the United Nations Principles on the Role of Prosecutors, the Council of Europe Recommendation on Independence, Efficiency and Role of Judges; the European Charter on the Statute for Judges, the United Nations Bangalore Principles of Judicial Conduct; Recommendations of the Committee of Minister of the Council of Europe and the Consultative Council of European Judges (CCJE), the Universal Charter of the Judge, the Budapest Principles adopted for prosecutors, the United Nations Convention against Corruption (UNCAC), the Criminal Law Convention on Corruption, and other relevant international instruments and standards.

== Bodies of YBD ==
=== Chairmanship Council ===
- İlhan AYAZ
- Harun KODALAK
- Ayhan AKYÜREK

=== Secretary General ===
- Dr. Birol KIRMAZ

=== Deputies of the Secretary General ===
- Fetih SAYIN
- Ali ÇALIK

=== Treasurer ===
- Hakan YÜKSEL

=== Press Agent ===
- Abbas ÖZDEN

=== Foreign Relations Commissioner ===
- Cafer ERGEN

=== Board of directors ===
- Musa HEYBET
- Dr. Gürsel ÖZKAN
- Mehmet GÖKPINAR
- Hakan PEKTAŞ
- Şerafettin ELMACI
- Erkan ÖZKAYA

== See also ==
- Supreme Board of Judges and Prosecutors
- Turkish Bars Association
