= Reha Denemeç =

Turkish politician

- Born: 20 May 1961 (age 65); Elazığ
- Education: ODTÜ; University of Delaware
- Occupations: Bureaucrat, politician, economist
- Years active: 22nd, 23rd and 24th Term Ankara Member of Parliament

Former deputy minister of the Ministry of National Education, senior advisor to the President of Turkey, member of parliament and vice chairman of the board of Defense Technologies Engineering and Trade Inc. (STM A.Ş.). Co-founder of the ruling Justice and Development Party (AK Party) and a permanent delegate to the Party’s congress. An honorary associate of the Parliamentary Assembly of the Council of Europe. Co-chair of Turkish-British Tatlıdil Forum. Executive Board Member of Foreign Economic Relations Board, Coordinator of Asia-Pacific Business Councils, Chairman of the Türkiye-ASEAN/BAC Business Council and Chairman of Turkey-Vietnam Business Council of DEİK. Board member of IC Holding. Middle East Technical University Development Foundation Board Member and İstanbul Technical University National Advisory Board Member.

== Political career ==
In the formative period of Justice and Development Party, Denemeç was co-founder of the party and advisor to the Party Chairman, Recep Tayyip Erdoğan. He served on the Party's Decision-Making Board for 14 years and on the Executive Board as its vice chairman in charge of research and development for 10 years. He was elected from Ankara as a member of the parliament for three consecutive terms, and was a member of Democracy Committee in the Turkish Parliament. He was also a member of the International Board of Parliamentarians for Global Action, a non-profit, non-partisan international network of elected legislators. He was advisor of the founder and Chairman of Yeni Parti (New Party), Dr. Yusuf Bozkurt Özal. The party was established to carry out the "Second Transformation Program" of former President Turgut Özal, who had aimed to establish an executive presidency with constitutional powers.

== Council of Europe ==
From 2013 to 2015, he was the Chairman of the Turkish Delegation and Vice President of the Parliamentary Assembly of the Council of Europe (PACE) in Strasbourg. He is an honorary associate of PACE. He was also awarded the pro merito medal in appreciation of his services for PACE.

== Public sector ==
Denemeç began his career in the public sector as the executive assistant to the Undersecretary of State Planning Organization (now Presidency of the Strategy and Budget). He was later appointed as the executive assistant and advisor to the Minister of State, in charge of the Central Bank, Treasury, Foreign Trade, Planning, Privatization, Statistics and all public banks. After receiving his graduate degree, he returned to State Planning Organization and worked as an expert at the Directorate of Economic Models and Strategic Research. Then, he was appointed deputy secretary-general of the State Planning Organization. Thereafter, he became the acting secretary-general of the organization. He served on the Technical Board of Turkish Standards Institution.

== Private sector ==
He served on the board of Başak Insurance, and was the chairman of Ataköy Otelcilik, the entity that owns the Holiday Inn and Crowne Plaza hotels in Istanbul. He also worked as a senior executive of an energy group of Çalık Holding with wide ranging sectors throughout Central Asia.

== Education and military service ==
Denemeç graduated from the Middle East Technical University in Ankara with a B.S. in economics. Later, he received his M.A. in economics from the University of Delaware. He also completed programs titled "Managing and Shaping Change in the Information Age" and "Innovation for Economic Development" at Harvard University's John F. Kennedy School of Government.

Denemeç served as a commando second lieutenant in the Turkish Armed Forces.

== Family ==
Denemeç is married with two children.
