= Aidul Fitriciada Azhari =

Indonesian politician

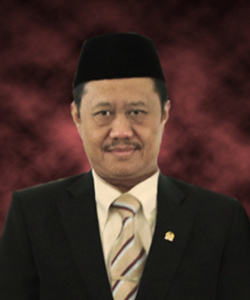
- Aidul Fitriciada Azhari

Deputy chair of the Judicial Commission of Indonesia
- In office 26 February 2016 – incumbent
- President: Joko Widodo
- Preceded by: Suparman Marzuki

Personal details
- Born: 1 January 1968 (age 58) Tasikmalaya, West Java, Indonesia
- Citizenship: Indonesian

Aidul Fitriciada Azhari became chairman of the Judicial Commission of Indonesia in 2016. Azhari has been referred to as a dark horse due to the fact that he initially hadn't been nominated nor had he volunteered to be the Judicial Commission's chairman. Two other candidates were rejected by the People's Representative Council before his confirmation.

Azhari's tenure has been strict. In the summer of 2016, the Judicial Commission offered fewer nominations for the Supreme Court of Indonesia and the corruption courts than the Supreme Court had requested; Azhari explained that not enough of the candidates under consideration actually met the Commission's minimum criteria for the positions. Azhari promoted the idea of studying other judicial systems such as those of Australia, Turkey and the United States to learn best practices. Specifically, Azhari pointed to the purge of 6,000 judges by the Supreme Board of Judges and Prosecutors after the 2016 Turkish coup d'état attempt as a positive example of the exercise of external oversight of a judiciary.
