= Ministry of Development (Turkey) =

Former government ministry of Turkey

- Kalkınma Bakanlığı

Agency overview
- Formed: 29 June 2011
- Dissolved: 10 July 2018
- Superseding agencies: Ministry of Industry and Technology; Directorate of Presidential Strategy and Budget
- Jurisdiction: Government of Turkey
- Headquarters: Ankara
- Minister responsible: Lütfi Elvan, Minister of Development
- Website: www.mod.gov.tr

The Ministry of Development (Turkish: Kalkınma Bakanlığı) was a government ministry in the Republic of Turkey that was formed on 29 June 2011 after the dissolution of the State Planning Organisation. The Ministry was led by Minister of Development Cevdet Yılmaz, of the Justice and Development Party (AKP), formally taking office on 6 July 2011 after the formation of Prime Minister Recep Tayyip Erdoğan's third cabinet. He was succeeded by Müslüm Doğan in August 2015, who resigned in September 2015 and was succeeded by Cüneyd Düzyol. Yılmaz took over the Ministry for a second time from November 2015 to May 2016 before being succeeded by Lütfi Elvan.

While active, the Ministry described itself as a Ministry with expertise, focusing on leading the development of Turkey in a holistic manner by making and facilitating strategic policy.

== List of ministers of development ==
	Name	From	Until	Party
1	Cevdet Yılmaz	6 July 2011	28 August 2015	Justice and Development Party
2	Müslüm Doğan	28 August 2015	22 September 2015	Peoples' Democratic Party
3	Cüneyd Düzyol	22 September 2015	24 November 2015	Independent
4	Cevdet Yılmaz	24 November 2015	24 May 2016	Justice and Development Party
5	Lütfi Elvan	24 May 2016	10 July 2018	Justice and Development Party
