= Lütfi Elvan =

Turkish politician (born 1962)

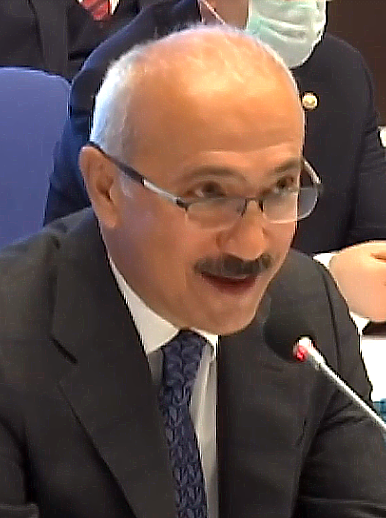

Minister of Treasury and Finance
- In office 10 November 2020 – 2 December 2021
- President: Recep Tayyip Erdoğan
- Preceded by: Berat Albayrak
- Succeeded by: Nureddin Nebati

Minister of Development
- In office 24 May 2016 – 10 July 2018
- Prime Minister: Binali Yıldırım
- Preceded by: Cevdet Yılmaz
- Succeeded by: Position abolished

Deputy Prime Minister of Turkey
- In office 24 November 2015 – 24 May 2016
- Prime Minister: Ahmet Davutoğlu
- Served with: Yalçın Akdoğan; Mehmet Şimşek; Tuğrul Türkeş; Numan Kurtulmuş
- Preceded by: Position established
- Succeeded by: Veysi Kaynak

Minister of Transport, Maritime and Communication
- In office 26 December 2013 – 7 March 2015
- Prime Minister: Recep Tayyip Erdoğan; Ahmet Davutoğlu
- Preceded by: Binali Yıldırım
- Succeeded by: Feridun Bilgin

Member of the Grand National Assembly
- In office 22 July 2007 – 10 November 2020
- Constituency: Karaman (2007, 2011); Antalya (June 2015); Mersin (Nov 2015, 2018)

Personal details
- Born: 12 March 1962 (age 64) Ermenek, Karaman Province, Turkey
- Party: Justice and Development Party
- Children: 2
- Education: Istanbul Technical University; University of Leeds; University of Delaware
- Profession: Politician, engineer

Lütfi Elvan (born 12 March 1962) is a Turkish politician. Elvan has served as the Minister of Finance and Treasury of Turkey from November 2020 to December 2021. He previously served as the Minister of Transport, Maritime and Communication from 2013 to 2015. He has served as a Member of Parliament for the electoral district of Karaman from 2007 to June 2015, for Antalya from June to November 2015 and for Mersin since November 2015. He is a member of the Justice and Development Party (AK Parti).

== Early life ==
Lütfi Elvan was born to A. Nuri Elvan and his wife Samiye at Ermenek town in Karaman Province on 12 March 1962.

He studied mining engineering at Istanbul Technical University graduating in 1983. Elvan received a scholarship from the state-owned mining company Etibank for further study abroad. He continued his education earning a master's degree in the fields of mining engineering and operations research with a thesis on "Determination of Optimal Production Systems in short-term Mining Production Planning" at University of Leeds, England in 1986. In 1995, he received a further master's degree in economics at University of Delaware, US.

== Professional career ==
Elvan began his professional career in 1987 as an engineer working in the operations research department at Etibank. There, he was instrumental in implementing computer-aided mining applications.

In 1989, he moved to State Planning Organization (DPT), and worked until 1996 as specialist. Appointed Head of Department for Regions with Development Priorities in 1996, he served at this post until 2002. He was promoted to Deputy Undersecretary of DPT in November 2002. In July 2007, he resigned from his post to enter politics.

== Political career ==
He joined the ruling Justice and Development Party (Akparty), and was elected into the Grand National Assembly of Turkey in the 2007 general election as an MP from Karaman Province. He became one of the party leader's head advisors. In the parliament, Elvan was appointed Head of the Hungary-Turkey Interparliamentary Group.

Elvan was re-elected into the parliament in the 2011 general election. He served as the chairman of the parliamentary Budget and Planning Commission.

On 26 December 2013, Elvan assumed office as the Minister of Transport, Maritime and Communication, succeeding Binali Yıldırım during Erdoğan's cabinet reshuffle with ten new names that was announced the day before, on 25 December, following the 2013 corruption scandal in Turkey.

=== Minister of Finance and Treasury ===
He assumed as Minister of Finance and Treasury in November 2020 as the successor of Erdogans son in-law Berat Albayrak. His tenure was marked with the fall of the Turkish lira and an ailing Turkish economy which he wanted to defend with a stable currency exchange rate and a low inflation. He didn't applaud Erdogans financial policy of low interest rates, resigned from his post on the 2 December 2021 and was succeeded by Nureddin Nebati.

== Personal life ==
Elvan is married and has two children.

Political offices
Preceded by Binali Yıldırım	Minister of Transport, Maritime and Communication; 26 December 2013 – 7 March 2015	Succeeded by Feridun Bilgin
Preceded by Cevdet Yılmaz	Ministry of Development; 24 May 2016 – 10 July 2018	Succeeded by Position abolished
Preceded by Berat Albayrak	Ministry of Treasury and Finance; 10 November 2020 – 2 December 2021	Succeeded by Nureddin Nebati
