= Karaman (electoral district) =

Electoral district for the Grand National Assembly of Turkey

Coordinates: 37°05′N 33°15′E

- electoral district for the Grand National Assembly of Turkey
- Karaman shown within Turkey
- Province: Karaman
- Electorate: 173,500

Current electoral district
- Created: 1991
- Seats: 3 Historical: 3 (2018-today)(1995-2011) 2 (1991-1993)(2011-2018)
- MPs: List: Recep ŞEKER AKP Selman Oğuzhan ESER AKP İsmail Atakan ÜNVER CHP
- Turnout at last election: 90.65%
- Representation
- AK Party: 2 / 3
- CHP: 1 / 3

Karaman is an electoral district of the Grand National Assembly of Turkey. It elects three members of parliament (deputies) to represent the province of the same name for a four-year term by the D'Hondt method, a party-list proportional representation system.

== Members ==
Population reviews of each electoral district are conducted before each general election, which can lead to certain districts being granted a smaller or greater number of parliamentary seats. As a small electoral district, Karaman's seat allocation has always been low. It was last reduced to three MPs in 1999.

MPs for Karaman, 1999 onwards
Seat	1999 (21st parliament)	2002 (22nd parliament)	2007 (23rd parliament)	2011 (24th parliament)	June 2015 (25th parliament)
1	Zeki Ünal; FP	Mevlüt Akgün; AK Party			Recep Konuk; AK Party
2	Fikret Ünlü; DSP	Lütfi Elvan; AK Party			Recep Şeker; AK Party
3	Hasan Çalış; MHP	Fikret Ünlü; CHP	Hasan Çalış; MHP	No seat	

== General elections ==
=== 2011 ===
General Election 2011: Karaman
Party	Candidate	Votes	%	±%
AK Party	2 elected 0: 1. Lütfi Elvan ✓; 2. Mevlüt Akgün ✓	80,455	57.29	▲5.96
CHP	None elected: 1. Fikret Ünlü ✗; 2. Osman Nuri Koçak ✗	26,511	18.88	▲3.70
MHP	None elected ▼1: 1. Hasan Çalış ✗; 2. Hamza Koçak ✗	25,642	18.26	▼0.40
SAADET	None elected: 1. Şaban Şahin ✗; 2. Hüseyin Uğuz ✗	2,707	1.93	▼1.11
HAS Party	None elected: 1. Abidin Çağlayan ✗; 2. Mehmet Macit ✗	1,455	1.04	▲1.04
Büyük Birlik	None elected: 1. Hüseyin Arı ✗; 2. Durmuş Ataş ✗	994	0.71	▲0.71
DP	None elected: 1. Mümtaz Kartal ✗; 2. Yusuf Uğur ✗	835	0.59	▼6.09
HEPAR	None elected: 1. Yücel Altun ✗; 2. Saniye Kangooğlu ✗	351	0.25	▲0.25
DYP	None elected: 1. Cihangir Kızıl ✗; 2. Süleyman Levent ✗	312	0.22	▲0.22
DSP	None elected: 1. Emir Musa Beydili ✗; 2. Mehmet Şengül ✗	309	0.22	N/A
Labour	None elected: 1. Esme Uyan ✗; 2. Şerif Karataş ✗	292	0.21	▼0.03
Nationalist Conservative	None elected: 1. Erkan Söker ✗; 2. Nusret Başol ✗	169	0.12	▲0.12
Communist_Party_of_Turkey_(today)	None elected: 1. Nurhak Coşkun ✗; 2. Rıza Tuna ✗	165	0.12	▼0.08
MP	None elected: 1. Mustafa Sayar ✗; 2. Salih Mısral ✗	138	0.10	▲0.10
Liberal Democrat	None elected: 1. İlker Tekbaş ✗; 2. Birhan Bora Erdoğan ✗	107	0.07	▼0.18
Total votes		140,442	100.00	
Rejected ballots		3,608	2.51	▲1.35
Turnout		143,603	90.02	▲0.34
AK Party hold Majority		53,944	38.41	▲5.74

=== June 2015 ===
Abbr.	Party	Votes	%
AKP	Justice and Development Party	80,042	55.5%
MHP	Nationalist Movement Party	32,876	22.8%
CHP	Republican People's Party	22,366	15.5%
SP	Felicity Party	4,037	2.8%
	Other	4,832	3.4%
Total		144,153	
Turnout		88.35	
source: YSK

=== November 2015 ===
Abbr.	Party	Votes	%
AKP	Justice and Development Party	94,321	64.6%
MHP	Nationalist Movement Party	23,692	16.2%
CHP	Republican People's Party	22,088	15.1%
SP	Felicity Party	1,426	1%
	Other	4,449	3%
Total		145,976	
Turnout		88.97	
source: YSK

=== 2018 ===
Abbr.	Party	Votes	%
AKP	Justice and Development Party	80,498	52.6%
MHP	Nationalist Movement Party	22,826	14.9%
CHP	Republican People's Party	24,608	16.1%
IYI	Good Party	17,784	11.6%
SP	Felicity Party	2,431	1.6%
	Other	4,825	3.2%
Total		152,972	
Turnout		90.39	
source: YSK

== Presidential elections ==
=== 2014 ===
Presidential Election 2014: Karaman
Party	Candidate	Votes	%
AK Party	Recep Tayyip Erdoğan	88,813	66.22
Independent	Ekmeleddin İhsanoğlu	43,093	32.13
HDP	Selahattin Demirtaş	2,212	1.65
Total votes		134,118	100.00
Rejected ballots		4,789	3.45
Turnout		165,590	83.89
Recep Tayyip Erdoğan win			
