= Union of Turkish Bar Associations =

Turkish Bars Association
- Type: Bar association
- Region served: Turkey
- President: Erinç Sağkan
- Website: barobirlik.org.tr

The Turkish Bars Association (correctly, the Union of Turkish Bar Associations) or Türkiye Barolar Birliği (TBB) has been established in 1969 and is an organisation for Turkish lawyers, uniting over 70,000 lawyers in 79 Turkish bar associations. Established in 1969, it is headquartered in Ankara. The current president is Erinç Sağkan.

The TBB is a member of the International Bar Association and the European Bar Federation.

== History ==
A “Union of Bars in Turkey” was established on the 5 April 1958. Since then the 5th of April is known as the "Lawyer's Day" in Turkey. Later on the Turkish Bars were organized in a different and more efficient way, and on the 7 April 1969 the Union of Turkish Bar Associations (TBB) was established with the Law No. 1136, concerning the legal profession (the “Attorney’s Law”). "Individuals who are not registered with a Bar Association may not use the title 'Attorney' or work in the profession, except the lawyers who are employed by state/government."

== Tensions with the government ==
=== Attorney Law ===
In May 2020, a majority of the heads of the provincial bar associations in Turkey announced opposition to a reform of the Attorney Law, which also stipulates regulations for their election. They stated that they were not asked for their opinion about a reform suggested by the Turkish Government of Recep Tayyip Erdogan. In June 2020, several provincial leaders of the Bar Association began a March to Ankara, in protest of the planned reform. In July 2020, the Turkish parliament passed the law on the Bar Associations, which was amended shortly thereafter. and since it is possible to create more than one Bar Association per province, as long as 2000 lawyers agree on it in a province with 5000 registered lawyers.

=== Diyanet's anti-LGBTQ and HIV speech ===
On April 26, 2020, Ali Erbaş, the president of Turkey's Presidency of Religious Affairs, made comments on LGBTQ+ people, saying that it's a disease and causes erosion to lineage, and even connected the people to the Coronavirus. Shortly, several Turkish Bar Associations, such as İzmir and Ankara Bar associations, condemned the presidency. However, after condemning the presidency, they themselves faced prosecution as the Turkish prosecutors accused the associations of "openly insulting religious values".

== Former Presidents ==
- Faruk Erem (1969-1980)
- Atila Sav (1980-1983)
- Teoman Evren (1984-1989)
- Önder Sav (1989-1995)
- Eralp Özgen (1996-2001)
- Özdemir Özok (2001-2010)
- Vedat Ahsen Coşar (2010-2013)
- Metin Feyzioğlu (2013-2021)
- Erinç Sağkan (2021-present)

== See also ==
- Association of Judicial Unity
