= 2010 Turkish constitutional referendum =

- 12 September 2010
- Constitutional referendum for 26 articles of the constitution.

Results
Choice	Votes	%
Yes	21,789,180	57.88%
No	15,854,113	42.12%
Valid votes	37,643,293	98.11%
Invalid or blank votes	725,961	1.89%
Total votes	38,369,254	100.00%
Registered voters/turnout	52,051,828	73.71%
- Results by province

A constitutional referendum on a number of changes to the constitution was held in Turkey on 12 September 2010. The results showed the majority supported the constitutional amendments, with 58% in favour and 42% against. The changes were aimed at bringing the constitution into compliance with European Union standards. Supporters of Turkish EU membership hope constitutional reform will facilitate the membership process.

== Background ==
After the military coup of 12 September 1980, a new constitution was drafted, designed by the military junta that came to power. Thirty years later, a referendum was held regarding a number of amendments to that constitution.

In 2010, the Turkish parliament adopted a series of constitutional amendments. The amendments did not achieve the required two-thirds majority (67%) for immediately implementing the changes. However, a majority of 330 votes (60%) was achieved and sufficient to present the amendments to the electorate in a referendum. A constitutional change, to make it more difficult for the Supreme Court to dissolve parties, failed to pass.

The reform package was accepted by parliament on 7 May, initiating the referendum process. The referendum was expected to be held 60 days after the publication of the package in the Official Gazette, but the Supreme Election Board (YSK) announced that it would be held 120 days later, on 12 September.

== Changes by theme ==
=== Coup leaders and military personnel ===
Provisional Article 15 of the Constitution, which provided protection to coup leaders, will be abolished. The amendments will allow the leaders of the 1980 coup to be sent to court. Military officers who commit crimes against the state, such as preparing coup plans, will be tried in civilian courts. Military personnel who are dismissed from the Turkish Armed Forces will have the right to appeal to the judiciary, the right to legal remedies and the right of defense.

Personal information such as names, photographs and ID information will be kept private. This kind of information will be stored only if the individual agrees to it, and individuals believing their personal information is being misused will be able to hold relevant entities accountable.

=== Economic and social rights ===
Businesspeople with tax debts will be able to travel abroad. Businesspeople facing an investigation or prosecution are prohibited from traveling abroad under current regulations. In the amendments, businesspeople will be able to travel abroad provided there is no court order restricting their travel.

Right to collective bargaining for government employees. While government employees will be granted the right to collective bargaining, the Public Employees' Arbitration Board consisting of government employee representatives will have the final say. The same right will be granted to the retired. Government employees who believe they have been punished unfairly will be able to go to court.

Restrictions on the right to strike will be removed. Restrictions on politically motivated strikes and lockouts will be removed to advance workers' rights. Labor unions will not be held liable for material damage to a workplace where a strike is being held as a result of deliberately negligent behavior by the workers and by the labor union.

The Economic and Social Council (ESK), which comprises representatives from unions, associations and confederations, will be given constitutional protection. The council will be effective in determining economic policies and the government's involvement in council activities will be removed.

=== Individual freedoms ===
Problems between the state and citizens will be resolved by way of an ombudsman without having to go to court. If citizens are not satisfied with judicial decisions, they will be able to directly petition the Constitutional Court.

Measures enacted to ensure equal rights for men and women will not be interpreted as contrary to the principle of equality, nor those enacted to protect children, elderly people, disabled people, widows and orphans of martyrs as well as for invalid and veterans.

Since the structure of the Constitutional Court will change, closing down parties will not be as easy as it used to be. Deputies will not be banned from politics if their party is closed down, but will keep their seats for the normal term.

Government workers, who until now could only be a member of one labor union, will now have a choice. Additionally, warnings and reprimands given to government employees will be open to judicial review. Government employees who believe they have been punished unfairly will be able to make claims in court.

=== Judicial reforms ===
Parliament will choose some of the members of the Constitutional Court. The number of Constitutional Court members will be expanded. Parliament will appoint three members while the president will appoint 14 members. The Constitutional Court will obtain a more democratic structure, consisting of two parts and functioning as a general assembly.

The Supreme Board of Judges and Prosecutors (HSYK) will increase in number from 7 to 22. Members will no longer be elected only by the Supreme Court of Appeals and the Council of State. A total of 11 judges from around 13,000 judges will be appointed to the board to represent judges on the bench.

Dismissed judges will be able to appeal to the judiciary. The HSYK's decisions, like YAŞ decisions, will be open to judicial review. Prosecutors and judges dismissed by the board will be able to challenge dismissal decisions in court.

All citizens will be able to file a petition with the Constitutional Court. This is now only possible at the European Court of Human Rights.

Besides the President, the ministers and other senior government officials, the chairman of the parliament and the supreme commander of the Turkish army can now also appear in the Supreme Court (Yüce Divan).

== Changes by article ==
Source: Government of Turkey, Prime Ministry (19 August 2010). "Law No 5982 Amending Certain Provisions of the Constitution" (PDF). Translated by Secretariat General for European Union Affairs. Secretariat General for European Union Affairs. Archived from the original (PDF) on 18 July 2011.

- Measures ensuring equality between men and women, and protecting children, the elderly, disabled people, widows and orphans of martyrs as well as for invalid and veterans would not be considered a violation of the principle of equality. (Revises Article 10)
- The protection of personal data and privacy would be revised, and everyone would be entitled to the protection of privacy. Access to data about personal information would be included within the new protection measures. (Revises Article 20)
- Travel bans would be relaxed. Trips abroad would be restricted only if a person is subject to a criminal investigation or a legal case. (Revises Article 23)
- Additional protections would be granted regarding family and children's rights. All children would expressly have the right to have direct communication with their mother and father and continue relations with them. (Revises Article 41)
- Public servants would be allowed to be members of more than one union. Civil servants would also have the right to collective bargaining with a body for conciliation to be established in the event of disagreement. (Revises Article 53)
- The ban on general strikes would be lifted. The measure would also include strikes held for political or solidarity purposes, as well as slowdown strikes. (Revises Article 54)
- An ombudsman system to deal with problems that may arise between state institutions and citizens would be established. Every citizen would be granted the right to request information and apply to the ombudsman. (Revises Article 74)
- Deputies would remain in their posts until their elected term ends, even if their parties are closed. (Revises Article 84)
- The tenure of deputies elected for Parliament's presidential board would be modified. (Revises Article 94)
- Decisions by the Supreme Military Council (YAŞ), that result in the expulsion of military officers from the Turkish Armed Forces, or TSK, would be allowed to be appealed in court. The amendment, however, has excluded YAŞ decisions that force military personnel to retire due to promotion procedures and the absence of tenure. Under current law, YAŞ decisions to expel military officers from the armed forces cannot be taken to court. (Revises Article 125)
- Public servants would be granted the right to collective bargaining with regard to their financial and social rights. (Revises Article 128)
- Public servants would be provided the right to apply to courts over censure or warning punishments they face in their workplaces. (Revises Article 129)
- Justice services and the supervision of prosecutors with regard to their administrative duties would be performed by Justice Ministry inspectors. (Revises Article 144)
- Civilian courts would be permitted to try military personnel, and military courts would not be permitted to try civilians other than during times of war. (Revises Article 145)
- The size and membership of the Constitutional Court would be restructured. The number of members of the country's top court would be raised to 17 from 11, and Parliament and the president would elect and appoint members. Currently only the president can appoint members to the Constitutional Court. (Revises Article 146)
- New court members would be selected for terms of 12 years or until they reach the age of 65. The current article does not set a term limit but stipulates that members retire upon reaching the age of 65. (Revises Article 147)
- Citizens would be allowed the right to make personal applications to the Constitutional Court. The article would also pave the way for the court to act as the Supreme Council and acquire the authority to judge the chief of General Staff, force commanders and the Parliament speaker in the event of abuses of power. It also allows for the appeal of decisions made while the court acts as the Supreme Council. (Revises Article 148)
- A quorum would be established for the Constitutional Court to convene and the minimum number of votes required to close a political party or annul constitutional amendments would be changed to two-thirds from three-fifths. (Revises Article 149)
- The organization and function of the military Supreme Court of Appeals would be restructured. (Revises Article 156)
- The function of the Supreme Military Administrative Court would be based on the principle of the freedom of the courts rather than the "necessity of military duty." (Revises Article 157)
- The HSYK would be restructured to consist of 22 regular and 12 substitute members. Nineteen members would be appointed, four by the president. The court would also function in three separate departments and would have the power to launch investigations against judges and prosecutors. (Revises Article 159)
- The Economic and Social Council would be established as a constitutional institution. The council provides consultation to the government in creating economic and social policies. (Revises Article 166)
- An article banning the prosecution of the 1980 coup leaders would be annulled. (Annuls temporary Article 15)

== Voting in parliament ==
On 30 March 2010, Turkey's ruling party submitted its package of constitutional amendments to the parliament. The changes were passed in parliament in late April and early May 2010 with over 330 votes, below the two-thirds majority of 367 votes needed to pass them directly, but enough to send them to a referendum within sixty days after President Abdullah Gül signs the law. On 13 May 2010, president Gül signed the reform package.

The composition of the parliament (550 seats) during the voting was as follows: AKP: 336, CHP: 97, MHP: 69, BDP: 20, Independent: 12, DSP: 6, DP: 1, TP: 1. The ruling Justice and Development Party (AKP) has 336 seats, but deputy Mehmet Ali Şahin cannot vote as he is the parliament speaker. CHP and BDP decided to boycott the voting. The Nationalist Movement Party (MHP) voted against the articles.

Each article required more than 330 votes in order to pass. The amendment for Article 69, which would have limited the ability of the Supreme Court to dissolve political parties, did not meet this threshold in the second round and was therefore dropped from the package.

The Constitution	Issue	First round				Second round				Results
The Constitution	Issue	MP turnout	Yes	No	Other	MP turnout	Yes	No	Other	Results
Article 10	Equality before the Law	407	336	70	1	408	332	75	1	check
Article 20	Privacy protection	405	337	68	0	408	334	72	2	check
Article 23	Prohibition to leave the country	408	337	71	0	407	335	71	1	check
Article 41	Family law and children's rights	408	336	69	3	408	338	69	1	check
Article 51	More than 1 union membership	405	333	70	2	409	335	70	4	check
Article 53	Collective bargaining	408	336	70	2	409	338	71	0	check
Article 54	Strike and lockout	408	335	69	4	409	337	71	1	check
Article 69	Political party closure	414	337	72	5	410	327	76	7	X mark
Article 74	Ombudsman	406	334	70	2	409	340	69	0	check
Article 84	Membership in parliament	408	335	70	3	409	335	73	1	check
Article 94	Parliament's presidential board	409	338	70	1	408	336	70	2	check
Article 125	Recourse to judicial review	408	336	70	2	409	338	69	2	check
Article 128	The right to collective bargaining	408	338	70	0	409	339	70	0	check
Article 129	The right to apply to courts	408	336	71	1	408	339	69	0	check
Article 144	Judicial oversight	407	335	71	1	409	338	70	1	check
Article 145	Military Justice	407	337	70	0	410	336	72	2	check
Article 146	Organisation of Constitutional Court	407	331	72	4	410	337	69	4	check
Article 147	Term of office and membership	406	335	70	1	408	337	71	0	check
Article 148	Functions and powers	407	337	69	1	408	337	70	1	check
Article 149	Functioning and trial procedure	408	338	70	0	408	336	71	1	check
Article 156	Military Court of Cassation	408	338	70	0	407	336	71	0	check
Article 157	High Military Administrative Court	407	335	70	2	408	337	71	0	check
Article 159	Organisation of the HSYK	409	336	72	1	409	334	73	2	check

== Annulment of the package ==
The main opposition party CHP not only argues that the constitutional package includes unconstitutional reforms, but also that it was passed through procedural violations. It wants the Constitutional Court to review the proposal process. The CHP's legal advisers also argued that the changes the package makes to the structures of the Constitutional Court and the Supreme Board of Judges and Prosecutors (HSYK) are in violation of the constitutional principle of separation of powers. With this claim, the CHP alleges that the AKP is attempting to change one of Turkey's constitutional articles that cannot be amended. So in addition to a review of the package on procedural grounds, the CHP also demands a review of the content of the package. The CHP also demands a stay of the referendum results, bringing the total of CHP demands to three.

On 7 July 2010, the Turkish Constitutional Court delivered its final verdict on a package of constitutional amendments, which is to be subject to a public referendum on 12 September. The court has ruled in favour of the vast majority of the government's proposed reforms to the constitution. The court did not annul the whole package. Judges annulled certain parts of two articles, but rejected the demands of the Turkish opposition to scrap the whole package on technical grounds. The partially annulled articles pertain to the structure of the Constitutional Court and the Supreme Board of Judges and Prosecutors (HSYK). They were controversial due to the changes envisioned in the member appointment processes.

Both the government and the opposition expressed disappointment with the Court's decision.

== Polls ==
A poll by Sonar Research in August 2010 forecasted 49.1% in favour of the draft and 50.9% opposed.

A poll by KONDA Research in September 2010 forecasted 56.8% in favour of the draft, 25.6% were opposed, while 17.6% were undecided.

== Results ==
Turkish constitutional referendum, 2010
Choice	Votes	%
For	21,788,272	57.88
Against	15,855,041	42.12
Total	37,643,313	100.00
Valid votes	37,643,313	98.11
Invalid/blank votes	725,852	1.89
Total votes	38,369,165	100.00
Registered voters/turnout	52,051,828	73.71

=== Results by province ===
Province	Registered voters	People voted	Valid votes	Invalid votes	Yes	Yes (%)	No	No (%)	Turnout (%)
Adana	1,386,290	1,009,435	992,202	17,233	434,066	43.75	558,136	56.25	72.82
Adıyaman	358,247	292,354	287,491	4,863	231,222	80.43	56,269	19.57	81.61
Afyonkarahisar	483,583	421,921	411,452	10,469	270,258	65.68	141,194	34.32	87.25
Ağrı	274,121	154,668	148,624	6,044	142,311	95.75	6,313	4.25	56.42
Aksaray	245,874	194,680	190,600	4,080	146,102	76.65	44,498	23.35	79.18
Amasya	233,005	205,982	202,159	3,823	118,637	58.68	83,522	41.32	88.4
Ankara	3,341,633	2,669,076	2,632,720	36,356	1,423,474	54.07	1,209,246	45.93	79.87
Antalya	1,354,787	1,046,905	1,027,278	19,627	444,564	43.28	582,714	56.72	77.27
Ardahan	69,508	53,635	51,835	1,800	28,510	55.00	23,325	45.00	77.16
Artvin	122,503	96,838	94,707	2,131	47,164	49.80	47,543	50.20	79.05
Aydın	719,726	598,062	585,485	12,577	209,820	35.84	375,665	64.16	83.1
Balıkesir	859,259	735,639	722,086	13,553	348,418	48.25	373,668	51.75	85.61
Bartın	140,105	121,146	116,891	4,255	64,713	55.36	52,178	44.64	86.47
Batman	260,951	105,987	99,500	6,487	94,218	94.69	5,282	5.31	40.62
Bayburt	48,973	41,432	40,777	655	34,687	85.07	6,090	14.93	84.6
Bilecik	141,196	124,512	121,762	2,750	60,256	49.49	61,506	50.51	88.18
Bingöl	154,117	118,652	115,651	3,001	110,167	95.26	5,484	4.74	76.99
Bitlis	174,195	121,962	116,543	5,419	108,471	93.07	8,072	6.93	70.01
Bolu	198,972	172,551	169,077	3,474	110,644	65.44	58,433	34.56	86.72
Burdur	184,987	165,187	160,711	4,476	84,511	52.59	76,200	47.41	89.3
Bursa	1,843,820	1,517,902	1,490,239	27,663	839,892	56.36	650,347	43.64	82.32
Çanakkale	360,770	314,284	308,723	5,561	123,800	40.10	184,923	59.90	87.11
Çankırı	130,511	109,633	107,527	2,106	82,272	76.51	25,255	23.49	84.0
Çorum	384,676	338,874	333,237	5,637	226,051	67.83	107,186	32.17	88.09
Denizli	665,282	575,622	562,978	12,644	260,643	46.30	302,335	53.70	86.52
Diyarbakır	851,241	296,245	278,871	17,374	261,916	93.92	16,955	6.08	34.8
Düzce	237,477	201,385	197,817	3,568	143,443	72.51	54,374	27.49	84.8
Edirne	296,576	254,358	249,744	4,614	66,233	26.52	183,511	73.48	85.76
Elazığ	374,530	302,605	296,663	5,942	242,611	81.78	54,052	18.22	80.8
Erzincan	143,843	123,158	121,643	1,515	77,880	64.02	43,763	35.98	85.62
Erzurum	474,085	379,988	373,026	6,962	324,011	86.86	49,015	13.14	80.15
Eskişehir	570,044	472,251	463,957	8,294	213,331	45.98	250,626	54.02	82.84
Gaziantep	984,683	716,358	701,112	15,246	489,706	69.85	211,406	30.15	72.75
Giresun	306,396	244,438	240,153	4,285	152,479	63.49	87,674	36.51	79.78
Gümüşhane	88,536	67,596	66,396	1,200	52,110	78.48	14,286	21.52	76.35
Hakkâri	128,572	11,634	10,512	1,122	9,910	94.27	602	5.73	9.05
Hatay	922,012	767,414	756,763	10,651	362,011	47.84	394,752	52.16	83.23
Iğdır	105,349	53,822	51,941	1,881	28,023	53.95	23,918	46.05	51.09
Isparta	298,726	251,725	245,664	6,061	141,226	57.49	104,438	42.51	84.27
Istanbul	9,206,124	6,743,672	6,641,160	102,512	3,643,666	54.86	2,997,494	45.14	73.25
İzmir	2,870,888	2,283,928	2,246,593	37,335	815,943	36.32	1,430,650	63.68	79.55
Kahramanmaraş	653,042	547,100	539,219	7,881	428,103	79.39	111,116	20.61	83.78
Karabük	163,081	136,555	133,024	3,531	84,821	63.76	48,203	36.24	83.73
Karaman	158,392	136,818	133,482	3,336	88,019	65.94	45,463	34.06	86.38
Kars	183,800	125,998	122,490	3,508	80,243	65.51	42,247	34.49	68.55
Kastamonu	269,272	228,815	223,044	5,771	140,006	62.77	83,038	37.23	84.98
Kayseri	812,554	692,502	680,984	11,518	498,812	73.25	182,172	26.75	85.23
Kilis	75,649	63,243	61,936	1,307	41,411	66.86	20,525	33.14	83.6
Kırıkkale	195,333	159,578	156,827	2,751	108,586	69.24	48,241	30.76	81.7
Kırklareli	251,751	220,111	216,797	3,314	55,542	25.62	161,255	74.38	87.43
Kırşehir	156,339	125,002	122,527	2,475	71,258	58.16	51,269	41.84	79.96
Kocaeli	1,071,556	864,871	848,323	16,548	516,533	60.89	331,790	39.11	80.71
Konya	1,327,534	1,117,186	1,096,922	20,264	857,167	78.14	239,755	21.86	84.15
Kütahya	418,071	372,393	364,178	8,215	272,217	74.75	91,961	25.25	89.07
Malatya	497,796	413,038	408,425	4,613	307,133	75.20	101,292	24.80	82.97
Manisa	960,069	829,573	810,917	18,656	402,626	49.65	408,291	50.35	86.41
Mardin	385,674	165,856	157,664	8,192	147,344	93.45	10,320	6.55	43.0
Mersin	1,123,115	818,141	804,397	13,744	299,004	37.17	505,393	62.83	72.85
Muğla	593,187	492,611	483,363	9,248	149,763	30.98	333,600	69.02	83.04
Muş	208,405	112,730	107,806	4,924	99,403	92.21	8,403	7.79	54.09
Nevşehir	196,436	167,489	164,404	3,085	111,049	67.55	53,355	32.45	85.26
Niğde	219,841	180,549	176,310	4,239	107,474	60.96	68,836	39.04	82.13
Ordu	508,677	400,122	391,422	8,700	248,557	63.50	142,865	36.50	78.66
Osmaniye	308,075	255,251	250,480	4,771	133,827	53.43	116,653	46.57	82.85
Rize	229,426	180,309	177,369	2,940	134,961	76.09	42,408	23.91	78.59
Sakarya	612,621	505,267	496,127	9,140	333,871	67.30	162,256	32.70	82.48
Samsun	874,952	722,865	709,959	12,906	476,774	67.16	233,185	32.84	82.62
Şanlıurfa	827,755	566,395	556,434	9,961	523,882	94.15	32,552	5.85	68.43
Siirt	150,645	76,648	72,342	4,306	68,845	95.17	3,497	4.83	50.88
Sinop	149,452	124,319	121,213	3,106	73,262	60.44	47,951	39.56	83.18
Şırnak	197,046	44,326	37,749	6,577	33,626	89.08	4,123	10.92	22.5
Sivas	429,921	355,596	350,504	5,092	268,472	76.60	82,032	23.40	82.71
Tekirdağ	567,415	465,412	458,124	7,288	158,825	34.67	299,299	65.33	82.02
Tokat	423,544	359,680	353,708	5,972	228,442	64.58	125,266	35.42	84.92
Trabzon	543,650	428,766	421,131	7,635	288,911	68.60	132,220	31.40	78.87
Tunceli	56,409	37,918	37,260	658	7,072	18.98	30,188	81.02	67.22
Uşak	245,586	216,999	211,620	5,379	105,355	49.78	106,265	50.22	88.36
Van	530,745	231,449	220,748	10,701	208,501	94.45	12,247	5.55	43.61
Yalova	148,306	115,990	113,885	2,105	58,304	51.20	55,581	48.80	78.21
Yozgat	319,155	257,444	253,675	3,769	196,153	77.32	57,522	22.68	80.66
Zonguldak	455,043	380,435	369,517	10,918	184,931	50.05	184,586	49.95	83.6
Customs	2,556,335	196,299	194,737	1,562	119,817	61.53	74,920	38.47	7.68
Turkey	52,051,828	38,369,165	37,643,313	725,852	21,788,272	57.88	15,855,041	42.12	73.71

Source: Government of Turkey, Supreme Election Board (YSK) (12 September 2010). "Official Results – 12 September 2010 Constitutional Referendum". Yüksek Seçim Kurulu. Archived from the original on 12 March 2012.

=== Voting irregularities ===
Kemal Kılıçdaroğlu, the leader of the opposition represented by the Republican People's Party (CHP), could not vote because of a mix-up over where he should cast his ballot. "It was my responsibility to check the register of electors, but I could not do it due to my intense referendum campaign," he said.

== Reactions ==
=== Domestic ===
- Justice and Development Party (AKP) – Following the announcement of the results, Prime Minister Erdoğan said the state had "crossed a historic threshold toward advanced democracy and the supremacy of law."
- Republican People's Party (CHP) – Pointing to the 42% of voters who said "No" at the referendum, Kılıçdaroğlu said such a figure could not be underestimated and his party had a major role in reaching such a rate. "When we look at the result, we see that the Justice and Development Party has taken a very important step towards creating a judiciary mechanism that is entirely dependent on itself," Kılıçdaroğlu said. He also added Erdoğan administration was seeking dangerous levels of control over the country's judiciary, with two of the 26 approved amendments allegedly giving excessive influence to the government over the courts.
- Nationalist Movement Party (MHP) – Having been the first to publish a written statement, party leader Devlet Bahçeli claimed that with the constitutional amendments which will serve the backdoor intentions of the AKP to create a sectarian judiciary being approved by the Turkish nation, Turkey was dragged into the Dark Ages littered with dangers and vital threats, adding that bad days are ahead.

=== International ===
The result of the referendum was welcomed by a number of international observers.

- European Union – The Enlargement Commissioner in the European Union, Štefan Füle, said: "As we consistently said in the past months, these reforms are a step in the right direction as they address a number of long-standing priorities in Turkey's efforts towards fully complying with the accession criteria." The European Parliamentary deputy Richard Howitt, spoke for the European Parliament's Socialist and Democrat Group when he declared his support for the referendum results. "The unexpectedly large 'yes' vote in Turkey's constitutional referendum is a sign of the population's support for reforms that will prepare the country for European Union membership." He also said it would be a blow to European critics who suggested Turkey does not have the political will to make the necessary reforms to join the EU. He also supported calls to draw up a new constitution through cross-party consensus.
  - Council of Europe – The Council of Europe's Secretary-General Thorbjorn Jagland called the move a significant step in the democratic development of Turkey. "The constitutional reform approved on Sunday is an important step forward towards bringing the country closer to European standards and practices."
- Germany – Foreign Minister Guido Westerwelle issued a statement saying "I welcome the success of the referendum," "The reform of the constitution is another important step by Turkey on the road towards Europe."
- Greece – Prime Minister George Papandreou called his Turkish counterpart to congratulate him for the government's success in Sunday's referendum on the constitutional amendment package. Greek Foreign Minister declared that the results of the referendum are a 'clear choice' and 'strong signal of support for the reforms promoted by Tayyip Erdoğan. "The Turkish people reaffirmed its commitment to the European perspective."
- Iran – In a telephone conversation with Turkish Foreign Minister Ahmet Davutoglu, Iranian Foreign Minister Manouchehr Mottaki congratulated the Turkish nation's vote of confidence to the Ankara government in the recent referendum on constitutional amendments. According to a Foreign Ministry statement, both sides expressed hope for the further expansion of all-out ties and described First Vice President Mohammad Reza Rahimi's upcoming trip to Turkey as another step towards bolstering Tehran-Ankara relations.
- Italy – Prime Minister Silvio Berlusconi has called the Turkish Prime Minister Tayyip Erdoğan to congratulate him for the "brilliant success" of the approval of the constitutional referendum and that there will be soon a bilateral summit between the two countries.
- Kosovo – Prime Minister Hashim Thaçi has made a telephone conversation with the Prime Minister of the Republic of Turkey, Recep Tayyip Erdoğan, to congratulate him and in which Erdoğan expressed Turkey's continued willingness to support the Republic of Kosovo.
- Lebanon – Prime Minister Saad al-Hariri telephoned his Turkish counterpart and congratulated him for the results of the referendum. Speaker of the Parliament Nabih Berri sent a telegram stating that this is a "historical and democratic victory" for Turkey and hoping that this referendum would be a lesson for democracy in the Middle East.
- Pakistan – Prime Minister Yousuf Raza Gilani called Turkish Prime Minister Recep Tayyip Erdoğan on telephone and congratulated him on victory in the referendum held on 12 Sept. He said," the results of referendum show the confidence of Turkish people in the dynamic leadership and pro-people policies of Mr. Erdoğan". He further said that the results were clear manifestation of the proof that democracy and democratic norms have strengthened to bring about changes for betterment of the people. The Prime Minister also expressed gratitude for assistance of the Turkish government and the people through Turkish Red Crescent for the victims of the 2010 Pakistan floods.
- Palestine – President Mahmoud Abbas called Turkish Prime Minister Recep Tayyip Erdoğan to congratulate him for the success on the constitutional referendum.
- Spain – Foreign Minister Miguel Angel Moratinos said the referendum sent a "clear signal of Turkey's European vocation and it demonstrates the commitment of the Turkish authorities to modernize the political and social institutions." "And although some countries still have doubts and reluctance, I believe that in the end logic will prevail," Moratinos told reporters ahead of a meeting of EU ministers in Brussels.
- Syria – President Bashar al-Assad telephoned the Turkish Prime Minister Recep Tayyip Erdoğan to congratulate him for the results of the referendum.
- Sweden – Foreign Minister Carl Bildt said: "This opens the European door, even though it will take time to take that step." With the referendum, Turkey "paves the way for a more open and democratic evolution of the country."
- United States – President Barack Obama also welcomed the results and called the Turkish Prime Minister Recep Tayyip Erdoğan to congratulate him and "acknowledged the vibrancy of Turkey's democracy as reflected in the turnout for the referendum."

== Aftermath ==
The Human Rights Association launched a petition to try Kenan Evren over his role in the 1980 coup, as Evren defended the coup, saying military intervention was needed to bring an end to years of violence between leftist and rightist factions.

Hüseyin Çelik, the deputy chairman of the AKP, said the party's agenda would now be to work on a new constitution after the 2011 elections.

== See also ==
- Politics of Turkey
