= Müslüm Doğan =

Turkish politician (born 1959)

Müslüm Doğan MP
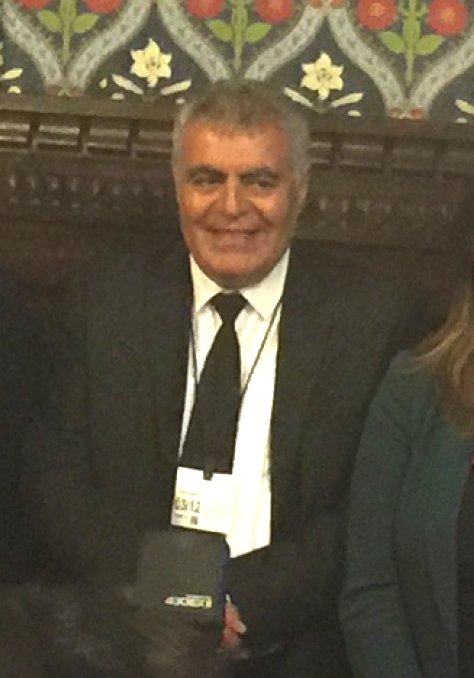

Minister of Development
- In office 28 August 2015 – 22 September 2015
- Prime Minister: Ahmet Davutoğlu
- Preceded by: Cevdet Yılmaz
- Succeeded by: Cüneyd Düzyol

Member of the Grand National Assembly
- Incumbent
- Assumed office 7 June 2015
- Constituency: İzmir (II) (June 2015, Nov 2015)

Personal details
- Born: October 15, 1959 (age 66) Divriği, Sivas Province, Turkey
- Party: Peoples' Democratic Party (HDP)
- Education: Selçuk University; Gazi University
- Occupation: Politician
- Cabinet: 63rd

Müslüm Doğan (born 15 October 1959) is a Turkish politician of Kurdish origin who served as the Minister of Development in the interim election government formed by Prime Minister Ahmet Davutoğlu on 28 August 2015. He was elected as a Member of Parliament for İzmir's second electoral district in the June 2015 general election. He is a member of the Peoples' Democratic Party (HDP). On 22 September 2015, he resigned from the interim election cabinet and was succeeded by Cüneyd Düzyol.

== Early life and career ==
Müslüm Doğan was born in Divriği, Sivas Province, on 15 October 1959. He graduated from Selçuk University Faculty of Engineering and received a master's degree from Gazi University Department of Urban Planning. Doğan spent much of his career in the Civil Service, working for the Social Security Institution (Turkish: Sosyal Güvenlik Kurumu, abbreviated SGK) as a branch manager and deputy bureau chairman. He retired from the SGK in 2012.

Doğan has also participated in the Union of Chambers of Turkish Engineers and Architects (TMMOB) as an executive board member for the Chamber of Surveying Engineers. He was also the President of the Divriği Association and the Pir Sultan Abdal Association. He has written numerous articles regarding his career and also on the topic of Alevism.

== Political career ==
Doğan was one of the founding members of the Peoples' Democratic Party (HDP) in 2012 and served on the party's first Central Executive Committee. In the June 2015 general election, he was elected as a HDP Member of Parliament for İzmir's second electoral district.

== Minister of Development ==
Doğan was one of the three HDP MPs invited by Prime Minister Ahmet Davutoğlu to take part in the interim election government that was formed after coalition negotiations proved unsuccessful and resulted in a new election being called for November 2015. Doğan accepted the invitation. On 28 August 2015, he was appointed as the Minister of Development in the caretaker cabinet.

=== Resignation ===
On 22 September 2015, Doğan and the other HDP cabinet minister Ali Haydar Konca submitted their resignations to Prime Minister Ahmet Davutoğlu, who accepted and stated that he would appoint their replacements as a matter of urgency. In a press conference shortly after submitting their resignations, the two ministers stated that they had resigned due to disagreements in the interim election cabinet and accused the AKP of ignoring the democratic will of the people to instead create a 'concept of war' in the south-east. They also condemned the AKP's involvement in the dissolution of the Solution process between the government and the Kurdistan Workers Party (PKK) and accused President Recep Tayyip Erdoğan of violating the Constitution during the government-forming process. Doğan later added that he had resigned due to a surge in attacks against the HDP as well as the election government's refusal to take their concerns about the fairness of the upcoming snap general election into account.

== See also ==
- Selahattin Demirtaş
- Figen Yüksekdağ
