= Metin Feyzioğlu =

Turkish politician and lawyer

Av. Prof. Doç Dr. Metin Feyzioğlu
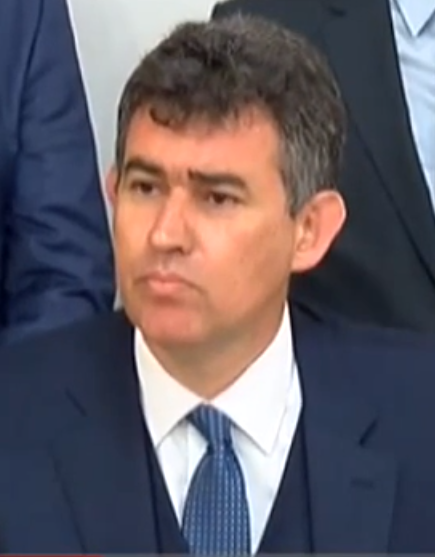

Turkish Ambassador to Czech Republic
- Incumbent
- Assumed office 25 October 2024
- Preceded by: Egemen Bağış

Turkish Ambassador to Northern Cyprus
- In office 28 November 2022 – 27 July 2024
- Preceded by: Ali Murat Başçeri
- Succeeded by: Yasin Ekrem Serim

8th President of the Turkish Bars Association
- In office May 26, 2013 – December 5, 2021
- Preceded by: Ahsen Coşar
- Succeeded by: Erinç Sağkan

Personal details
- Born: 7 July 1969 (age 56) Kadıköy, Istanbul, Turkey
- Spouse: Birgül Feyzioğlu
- Children: 2
- Relatives: Turhan Feyzioğlu (grandfather)
- Education: Law
- Alma mater: Ankara University
- Occupation: Lawyer, politician

Metin Feyzioğlu (born 7 July 1969) is a Turkish lawyer and a professor of criminal law who served as the 8th president of the Turkish Bars Association between May 2013 and December 2021. Metin Feyzioğlu was appointed as Türkiye's new ambassador to Prague in July 2024. He is the grandson of Turhan Feyzioğlu, a former CHP politician and deputy prime minister.

== Early life and career ==
Metin Feyzioğlu was born on 7 July 1969 in Kadıköy, Istanbul. He was raised by his grandparents Turhan Feyzioğlu and his wife Leyla Feyzioğlu, graduating from TED Ankara College in 1986. In 1990, he graduated from Ankara University Faculty of Law. In 1992, he received a master's degree in public law and received a Ph.D. in the same field in 1995. In 1996, he returned to the Ankara University Law Faculty as an assistant docent, specialising in criminal law and obtained a legal English certificate from Columbia University. He became an associate professor in 2000 and a professor in 2005. In 2007, he became the dean of the Ankara University Faculty of Law and served until 2008.

=== Legal positions ===
On 10 October 2010, Feyzioğlu was elected as the President of the Ankara Bar Association, to which he had been registered since 1991. He obtained 58% of the votes in the 61st Ordinary General Assembly. He was re-elected in the 62nd Ordinary General Assembly, this time winning 60% of the vote.

== President of the Turkish Bars Association ==
On 26 May 2013, Feyzioğlu stood as a candidate for the Presidency of the Turkish Bars Association (TBB), during the Association's 32nd Ordinary General Assembly. He was elected with 50% of the votes cast. During his term as President, he has been strongly critical of the ruling Justice and Development Party (AKP) government, which he has accused of attempting to eradicate judicial independence and limit the rights and freedoms of citizens.

== Political activism ==
Feyzioğlu is a declared member and supporter of the Republican People's Party (CHP), though has been critical of the party's central executive committee and the leadership of Kemal Kılıçdaroğlu. On 18 July 2012, he became a member of the CHP party council from the Management Science and Culture quota, though resigned on 26 May 2013 after he was elected as the President of the Turkish Bars Association.

=== Polemic with Prime Minister Erdoğan ===
On 10 May 2014, Feyzioğlu gave a speech during an event marking the 146th anniversary of the Turkish Council of State. His speech lasted for over 40 minutes longer than scheduled, prompting the then-Turkish Prime Minister Recep Tayyip Erdoğan to interrupt and protest against the extension. Erdoğan accused Feyzioğlu of 'speaking politically and wrongly', to which Feyzioğlu replied 'what am I saying wrongly?'. In response, Erdoğan accused Feyzioğlu of shamelessness, an allegation that Feyzioğlu denied and claimed 'I would never see it in myself to accuse someone of being shameless'. Following the argument, Erdoğan and numerous other government members walked out on the speech, with many commentators drawing attention to how President Abdullah Gül followed Erdoğan out. Many commentators claimed that this showed that Erdoğan had dominance over both the government and the Presidency.

=== Potential presidential candidacy ===
Having received a surge in support by CHP members following his argument with Erdoğan, Feyzioğlu was pitched by several members as a possible CHP presidential candidate in the presidential election scheduled for August 2014. In response to questions over a possible candidacy, Feyzioğlu replied saying that it was out of the question, though stated that he would tell the media if he received an offer from the CHP to stand as their candidate. The CHP eventually fielded Ekmeleddin İhsanoğlu as a joint candidate with the Nationalist Movement Party (MHP), who ended up losing the election to Erdoğan.

=== Potential CHP leadership bid ===
After the CHP and MHP's joint candidate Ekmeleddin İhsanoğlu lost the presidential election, CHP leader Kemal Kılıçdaroğlu announced that the party would hold an extraordinary convention following criticisms of his electoral performance. Rumours arose that Feyzioğlu was preparing to stand against Kılıçdaroğlu in the leadership election, having long been critical of Kılıçdaroğlu's leadership. Feyzioğlu subsequently stated that he was looking at a possible leadership bid, but later stated that he would not stand. Feyzioğlu criticised the delegate system, which political parties had to use according to law, as undemocratic, since the party leader (Kılıçdaroğlu) is essentially responsible for choosing the delegates that get to vote in the leadership election.

Following the June 2015 general election, in which the CHP vote declined by 1%, Feyzioğlu called for Kılıçdaroğlu's resignation and a new extraordinary convention. His statement was met by fierce criticism from the Ankara Bars Association, which called for Feyzioğlu's resignation as Turkish Bars Association President for breaching neutrality. Their calls for his resignation were dismissed by Feyzioğlu.

=== Dismissal by Protesting Chairmen of Bar Associations ===
When the Chairmen of all Bar Associations in Turkey began a protest against the government's proposals for changing the Bar Associations Law, Feyzioğlu failed to stand with them, and stayed silent when police physically attacked protesting chairmen. After a day of silence, he tried to visit the protesting chairmen, but was summarily dismissed by the chairmen, all of whom turned their backs to him, telling "he should better leave."

== See also ==
- Judiciary of Turkey
- Supreme Board of Judges and Prosecutors
