= Cyprus–Turkey relations =

- Cyprus: Turkey

Since the Turkish invasion of Cyprus in 1974 following a coup, Cyprus has been de facto divided into a Greek Cypriot south (Republic of Cyprus) and a Turkish Cypriot north (Turkish Republic of Northern Cyprus). Turkey does not recognize the internationally recognized government of the Republic of Cyprus and does not maintain diplomatic relations with it. Instead, Ankara recognizes only Northern Cyprus, which is not recognized by any country other than Turkey and is almost completely dependent on Turkey economically and politically. This unresolved core issue continues to strain all areas of Cypriot-Turkish relations to this day. Turkey has imposed a trade boycott on the Republic of Cyprus, which in turn, as a member of the European Union since 2004, has blocked Turkey's accession to the EU.

== History ==
=== Ottoman Cyprus (1571–1914) ===
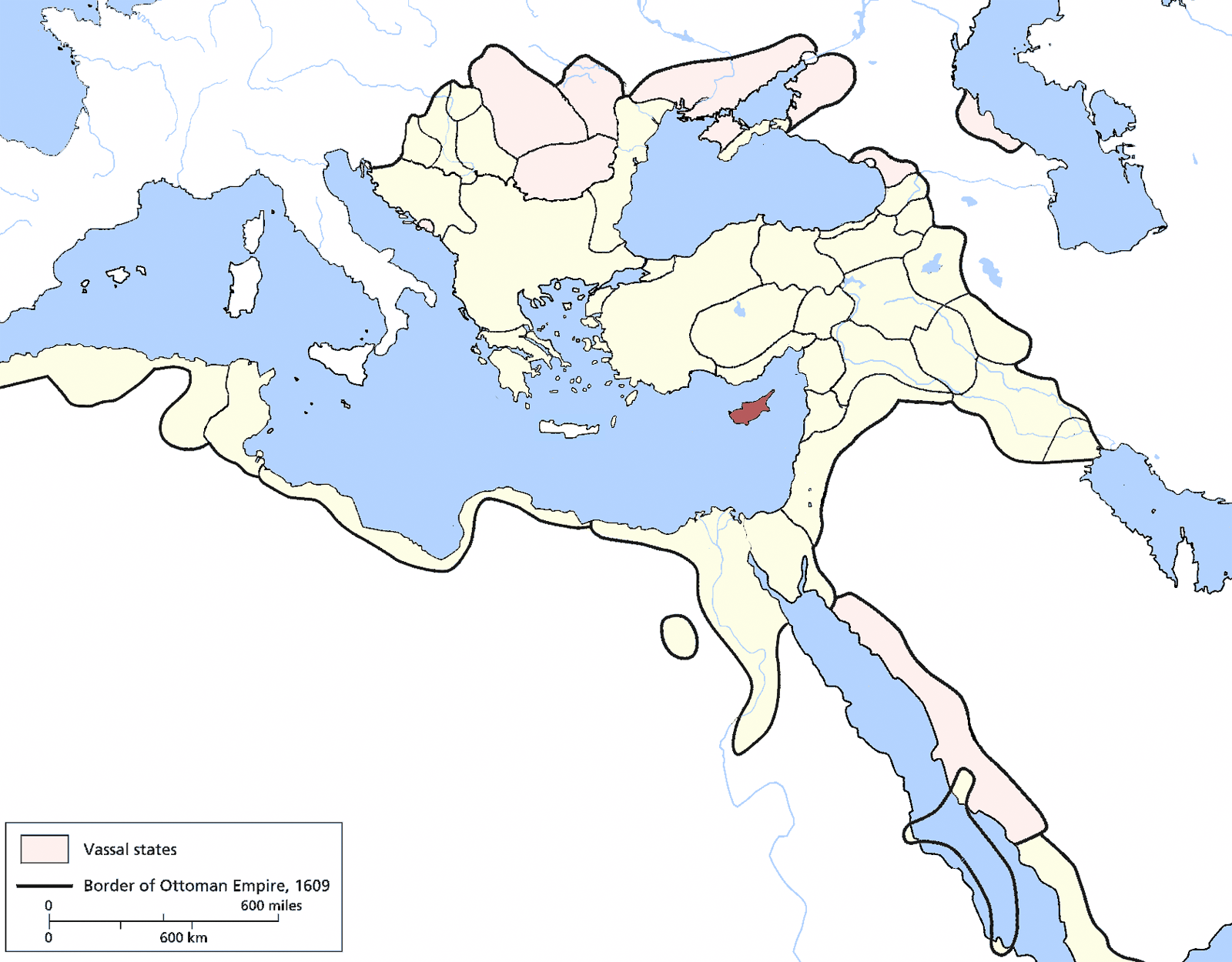
Cyprus inside the Ottoman Empire (1609)

Cyprus was under Ottoman rule from 1571 to 1914. After the conquest by the Republic of Venice, the Ottoman administration settled tens of thousands of Muslims from Anatolia on the island, leading to the emergence of a Turkish Cypriot community. At the same time, the Greek Orthodox Church was granted extensive autonomy, while the Latin (Catholic) hierarchy of the Venetians was abolished. In the first centuries of the Ottoman era, Greek and Turkish Cypriots lived largely segregated, without close social contact with each other. From the 19th century onwards, tensions also grew: in the wake of the Greek War of Independence, anti-Ottoman unrest broke out in Cyprus in 1821. The authorities brutally suppressed the uprising and executed archbishop Kyprianos of Cyprus and hundreds of prominent Cypriots. To prevent further revolts, Constantinople subsequently granted the Greek Cypriot elite greater rights of co-determination. Finally, in 1878, against the backdrop of the Russian-Ottoman War, the Ottoman Empire transferred the administration of Cyprus to Great Britain under a secret agreement, but retained nominal sovereignty. When the Ottoman Empire fought alongside the Central Powers in World War I, London unilaterally annexed the island in 1914; the young Republic of Turkey finally confirmed the loss of Cyprus in the Treaty of Lausanne in 1923 and recognized British sovereignty.

=== British Cyprus (1914–1960) ===
Under British administration, the Cyprus conflict gradually developed into an international issue. The Greek Cypriot majority increasingly demanded enosis, i.e. union with Greece, while the Turkish minority (around 18% of the island's inhabitants) preferred partition (taksim) or remaining under British rule. Great Britain pursued a colonial divide-and-rule strategy to curb the Enosis aspirations: the colonial power played the two ethnic groups off against each other and, from the 1950s onwards, also drew Turkey into the conflict. In 1955, the Greek Cypriot underground organization EOKA, led by Georgios Grivas, launched a guerrilla war against British rule with the aim of uniting with Greece. At the same time, armed groups formed on the Turkish side (including the TMT under Rauf Denktaş), which were supported by Ankara and sought to divide the island.

The growing violence between EOKA members, Turkish Cypriot militias, and the colonial authorities claimed numerous victims and forced many Turkish Cypriots to move from mixed areas to safe enclaves. From 1956 onwards, London signaled that the Turkish population, like the Greek population, had a right to self-determination (up to and including partition). Finally, in 1959, Great Britain, Turkey, and Greece—together with representatives of the two Cypriot communities—agreed on a compromise solution in the Zurich and London Agreements that led to the independence of Cyprus. The agreements provided for a bicommunal state in which power and offices were divided between Greek and Turkish Cypriots in a fixed ratio, and guaranteed the new order through the three “guarantor powers” of Great Britain, Turkey, and Greece, which were granted the right to military intervention in the event of violations of the agreement. On August 16, 1960, the Republic of Cyprus was officially founded and initially governed jointly by both ethnic group.

=== Independence of Cyprus and crisis 1960–1974 ===
The balance of power in the young Republic of Cyprus soon proved unstable. President Archbishop Makarios III and Vice President Fazıl Küçük faced a cumbersome power-sharing arrangement in which the Turkish minority (around 18% of the population) was disproportionately represented in the state apparatus (the parliament consisted of 35 Greek and 15 Turkish members). In November 1963, Makarios proposed 13 constitutional amendments aimed at disempowering Turkish Cypriots (including abolishing the Turkish vice president's right of veto). The Turkish Cypriot leadership and Turkey, as their protector, firmly rejected these amendments, and shortly thereafter, in December 1963, armed clashes broke out between the two ethnic groups. The worst unrest around Christmas 1963 – referred to by Turkish Cypriots as the “Bloody Christmas” – claimed numerous lives and led to Turkish Cypriot officials and members of parliament withdrawing from the government and parliament. As a result, the joint administration collapsed: the Republic of Cyprus effectively became a Greek Cypriot government, while the Turkish Cypriots administered themselves in enclaves.

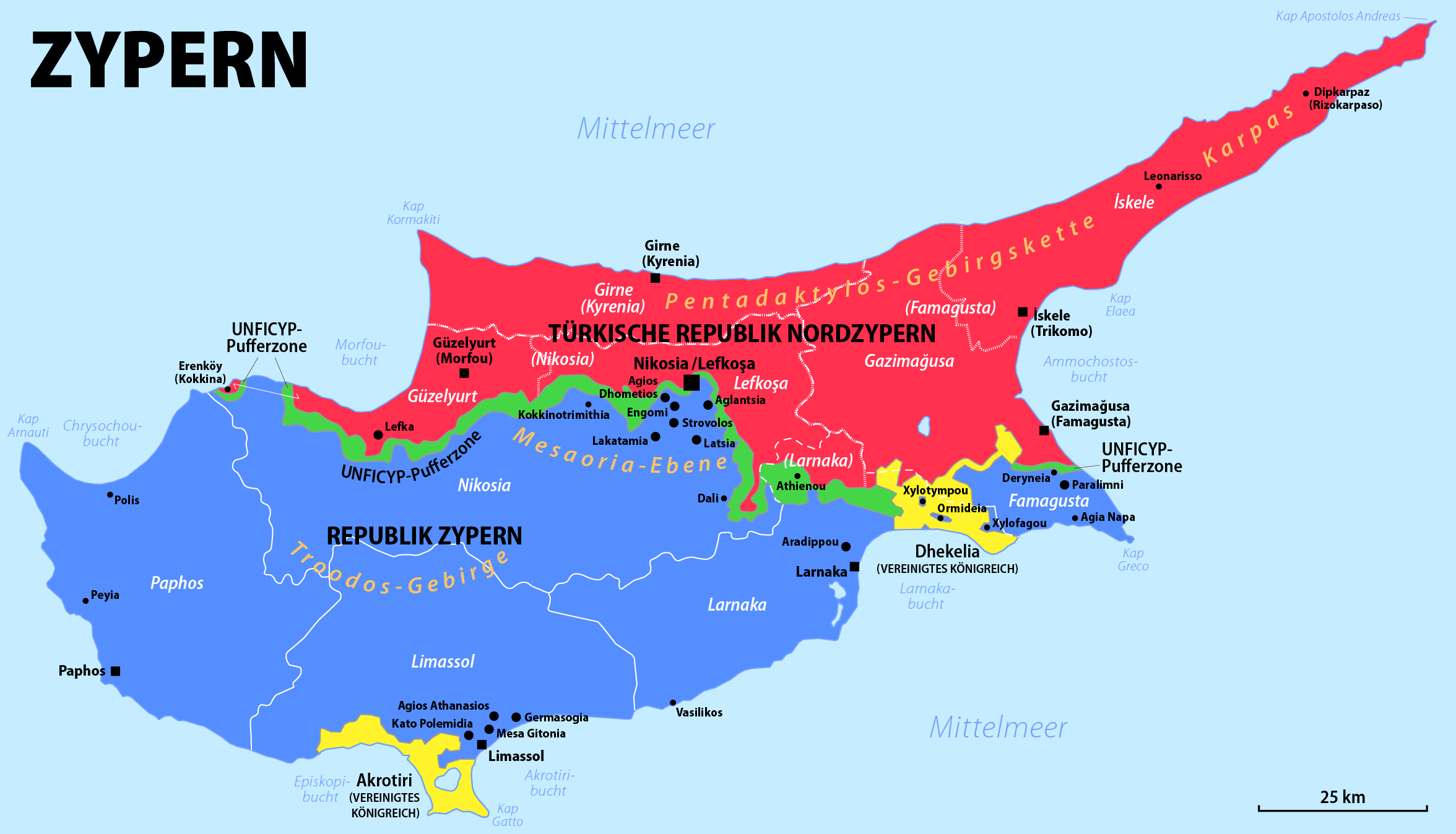
The divided Cyprus with a UN buffer zone and British military bases

In March 1964, the United Nations sent the peacekeeping mission UNFICYP, which is still stationed on the island today, to prevent an open civil war. Nevertheless, conflicts flared up periodically (such as the fighting at Kofinou in 1967), and Turkey repeatedly threatened to intervene to protect the Turkish Cypriots. On July 15, 1974, the Greek military junta ruling in Athens staged a coup against Makarios in order to finally achieve Enosis. Five days later, Turkey responded with a military intervention, citing the 1960 guarantee agreement: Turkish troops landed in northern Cyprus on July 20, 1974. In two waves of offensives (July and August 1974), they brought almost 40% of the country under their control, including the cities of Kyrenia and Famagusta. Around 3,400 Greek Cypriots were killed during the fighting or have been missing ever since, and around 165,000 were forced to flee the northern part of the island. At the same time, around 45,000 Turkish Cypriots were expelled from the south and settled in the Turkish-occupied zones. The island was now effectively divided; on August 16, 1974, a UN-monitored ceasefire came into effect, creating the demarcated Green Line that still exists today.

=== Relations since partition (after 1974) ===
Since the division of Cyprus in 1974, the Republic of Turkey has had no official relations with the Republic of Cyprus. Instead, Turkey established a dependent puppet government in the north: on November 15, 1983, the Turkish Cypriot leadership under Rauf Denktaş unilaterally proclaimed the Turkish Republic of Northern Cyprus (TRNC), which to this day is recognized as independent only by Turkey. Ankara considers the government in Nicosia to be merely the administration of the southern part of the island and refuses to grant it any diplomatic recognition. In the decades that followed, all attempts at mediation to overcome the division of the island were unsuccessful. Although both communities agreed in principle in 1977/79 on the goal of a bizonal, bicommunal federation, concrete plans repeatedly failed. A high point was the Annan Plan presented by UN Secretary-General Kofi Annan, which was put to a vote in separate referendums in 2004. While 65% of Turkish Cypriots approved the comprehensive reunification plan, 76% of Greek Cypriots rejected it, causing the solution to fail.

The Republic of Cyprus then joined the EU on May 1, 2004, divided—although EU law remains suspended in the northern part until further notice. Another attempt to form a federation ended in July 2017 without result when negotiations at the international Cyprus conference in Crans-Montana broke down without agreement. Since then, the Turkish government under President Erdoğan has pursued a change of course in its Cyprus policy: Ankara and the Turkish Cypriot leadership now openly declare that only a permanent two-state solution on the island is realistic. This position is contrary to the UN peace plans and is strongly rejected by Cyprus, Greece, and the EU. This has further hardened the fronts. Turkey continues to station soldiers in northern Cyprus and maintains political, economic, and military influence in the area (increasingly also against resistance from the Turkish Cypriots). Recurring tensions—such as those surrounding natural gas extraction off the coast of Cyprus and the partial reopening of the abandoned coastal town of Varosia in 2020—have since characterized the conflict-ridden relationship between the two countries.

In September 2025, The leader of Northern Cyprus, Ersin Tatar, warned that weapons supplied to Greek Cypriots through Israel are increasing tensions on the island. He said the Greek Cypriot side talks about peace but keeps buying arms, which threatens stability. Tatar explained that Northern Cyprus no longer supports a federal solution and instead demands recognition as a separate sovereign state. He also criticized Greek Cypriots for acting alone on natural gas projects and stressed that Turkey's support makes the north stronger in protecting its position.

On June 8, 2026, aircraft carrying the defense ministers of Greece, France and the Netherlands, along with other EU officials, were traveling to a meeting of EU defense ministers in Cyprus. Greek and Cypriot officials alleged that radio communications with an aircraft were interfered with by air traffic controllers operating from northern Cyprus and that two Turkish F-16 fighter jets were launched during the flights. Turkish Cypriot officials reportedly said that the F-16s had taken off because of an "emergency" without providing further details about its nature. Turkey denied any harassment, stating that the aircraft had entered airspace claimed by Northern Cyprus and that the F-16s were scrambled as a precautionary measure. Following the incident, Cyprus announced that it would lodge an official complaint with the European Union and relevant international bodies regarding what it described as Turkish interference with the ministerial flights.

==== 2026 United Nations climate conference (COP31) ====
A diplomatic dispute emerged ahead of the 2026 United Nations climate conference (COP31) after Turkey, the host of the summit, excluded Cyprus from several key preparatory activities despite Cyprus serving as the rotating president of the Council of the European Union.

The controversy became particularly apparent during a preparatory briefing at U.N. headquarters in New York in March. Although Cyprus attended as part of the EU delegation, Turkish representatives objected to its presence. In addition, Turkey rejected requests for bilateral meetings submitted by Cyprus in its capacity as the representative of the EU Council presidency.

The incident generated concern within the European Union, with some diplomats reportedly expressing relief that Cyprus would no longer hold the EU presidency when COP31 takes place, as the role will pass to Ireland before the conference.

Following criticism over the March incident, Turkish officials reportedly defended their actions by arguing that the New York briefing was not an official U.N. mandated event and that, as organizers, they had the discretion to decide whom to invite.

COP31 was being organized jointly by Turkey and Australia. The European Commission confirmed that it had raised the issue with both countries as well as with the United Nations. Australian Climate Minister emphasized that Australia and Turkey share a commitment to ensuring that COP31 is conducted in a transparent, inclusive and collaborative manner.

A European Commission spokesperson stated that excluding a U.N. member state from the preparatory process for a U.N. climate conference was unacceptable. The spokesperson added that Turkey had assured the EU that Cyprus would not be excluded from future COP31 preparatory meetings.

In November 2026, Cypriot President Nikos Christodoulides travelled to Antalya, Turkey, to attend the COP31 leaders summit after Cyprus secured an official invitation through diplomatic efforts by Nicosia and support from the European institutions and EU member states, following reported attempts by Turkey to exclude the country. During the summit, the Turkish delegation removed their interpretation headphones during Christodoulides speech, while Turkish President Recep Tayyip Erdogan left the leaders reception area before Christodoulides arrived, leaving UN Secretary General Antonio Guterres to welcome him alone. Cyprus criticised these actions and raised the matter with European Commission President Ursula von der Leyen.

== Economic relations ==
Direct economic relations between the Republic of Cyprus (the Greek-controlled south) and Turkey are extremely limited due to non-recognition and mutual restrictions. Since 1987, Ankara has banned ships flying the Cypriot flag from entering Turkish ports (an embargo that was even tightened in 2023). In addition, Turkey refuses to open its ports and airports to transport from Cyprus, despite commitments made to the EU. This transport and trade embargo became the subject of the EU-Turkey accession negotiations in 2006: due to Ankara's violation of the so-called Ankara Protocol (extension of the customs union to Cyprus), the EU suspended eight chapters of negotiations with Turkey in December 2006. The Turkish government made any concession on the port issue conditional on the simultaneous authorisation of direct trade between the EU and isolated Northern Cyprus, which was blocked by the Republic of Cyprus. Since then, neither side has budged from its position, meaning that bilateral trade continues at a low level. There is virtually no official direct investment or tourism between southern Cyprus and Turkey, as there are no flights between the two and no diplomatic agreements.

The economy of Northern Cyprus, on the other hand, is completely dependent on Ankara: Turkey contributes a significant portion of the TRNC's budget and finances wages, infrastructure, and energy supplies in the north. At the same time, Turkey claims influence over resources off the coast of Cyprus. It disputes the Republic of Cyprus's sole right to extract natural gas and demands that the proceeds be shared with Turkish Cypriots. In recent years, Ankara has carried out unauthorized natural gas exploration drilling in Cyprus's Exclusive Economic Zone (EEZ), which the EU has condemned as a violation of international law. In response, the EU imposed sanctions on those responsible for these Turkish offshore drilling activities for the first time in 2019.

== See also ==
- Foreign relations of Cyprus
- Foreign relations of Turkey
- Cyprus and the European Union
- Cyprus–NATO relations
- Turkey–European Union relations
