= State Planning Organization (Turkey) =

- Devlet Planlama Teşkilatı
- Abbreviation: DPT
- Formation: September 30, 1960; 66 years ago
- Dissolved: June 2011; 15 years ago
- Type: Public
- Legal status: Defunct
- Location: Yücetepe, Ankara, Turkey
- Coordinates: 39°55′05″N 32°50′43″E
- Website: www.dpt.gov.tr

State Planning Organization (Turkish: Devlet Planlama Teşkilatı, DPT) was established on September 30, 1960, National Unity Committee's initiatives following the 1960 Turkish coup d'état. Unlike the previous administration, which limited state planning primarily to agriculture, this new body was tasked with advising the government on setting economic, social, and cultural objectives, as well as formulating five-year plans in alignment with these objectives.

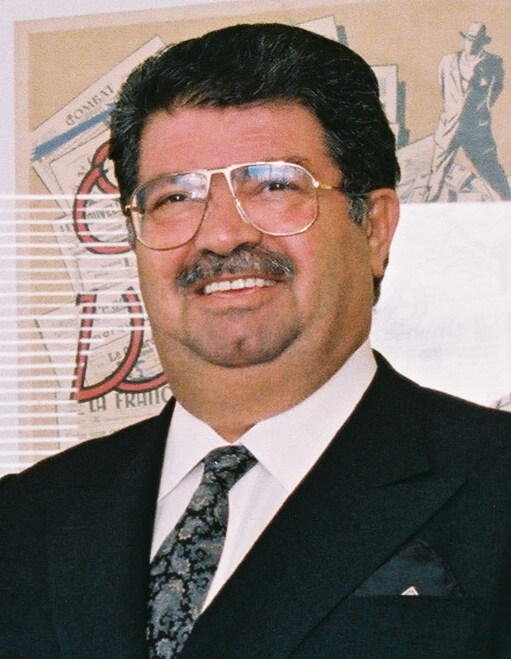
Turgut Özal, the 8th President of Turkey, worked at the State Planning Organization early in his career.

As one of Turkey's key governmental agencies, it played a pivotal role in shaping state policy. However, with the gradual liberalization of Turkey's economic policies, the organization's influence waned. In June 2011, it was absorbed into the newly formed Ministry of Development, reflecting shifts in the country's planning and development strategies.

== Notable DPT people ==
- Turgut Özal (1927–1993) — 8th President of Turkey, Prime minister (1983–1989)
- Cevdet Yılmaz (born 1967) — Vice President of Turkey
- Hikmet Çetin (born 1937) — Former Minister of Foreign Affairs and NATO Senior Civilian Representative in Afghanistan
- Lütfi Elvan (born 1962) — Former Minister of Finance and Treasury (2020–2021)
- Nazım Ekren (born 1956) — Deputy Prime Minister in charge of the DPT (2007–2009)
- Beşir Atalay (born 1947) — Deputy Prime Minister of Turkey (2011–2014)
- Reha Denemeç (born 1961) — Senior advisor to the President of Turkey
- Hasan Celal Güzel (1945–2018) — Former Minister of Education, Youth and Sport
- Besim Üstünel (1927–2015) — Former Minister of Finance of Turkey
- Atilla Karaosmanoğlu (1932–2013) — Deputy Prime Minister of Turkey (1971)
- Nur Yalman (1931-2026) — Chairman of Koç University, emeritus at Harvard. During his time teaching at Middle East Technical University, also served as a special advisor in the DPT
- Alev Alatlı (1944–2024) — Columnist, bestselling novelist, academic and economist
- Halil İbrahim Akça (born 1963) — Turkish ambassador to Brazil, and was the 11th Secretary General of the Economic Cooperation Organization (ECO)
- Nevzat Yalçıntaş (1933–2016) — President of the Intellectuals' Hearth (1988–1998)
- Güngör Uras (1933–2018) — Economist, journalist, academic and author
- Temel Karamollaoğlu (born 1941) — Former leader of the Felicity Party
- Ziya Müezzinoğlu (1919–2020) — General director of the DPT (1959–1960)

== Notable projects ==
- RASAT — Remote sensing satellite launched in 2011, financed and operated by the DPT.
