= Embassy of Northern Cyprus, Ankara =

Embassy of the Turkish Republic of Northern Cyprus in Ankara Kuzey Kıbrıs Türk Cumhuriyeti'nin Ankara Büyükelçiliği
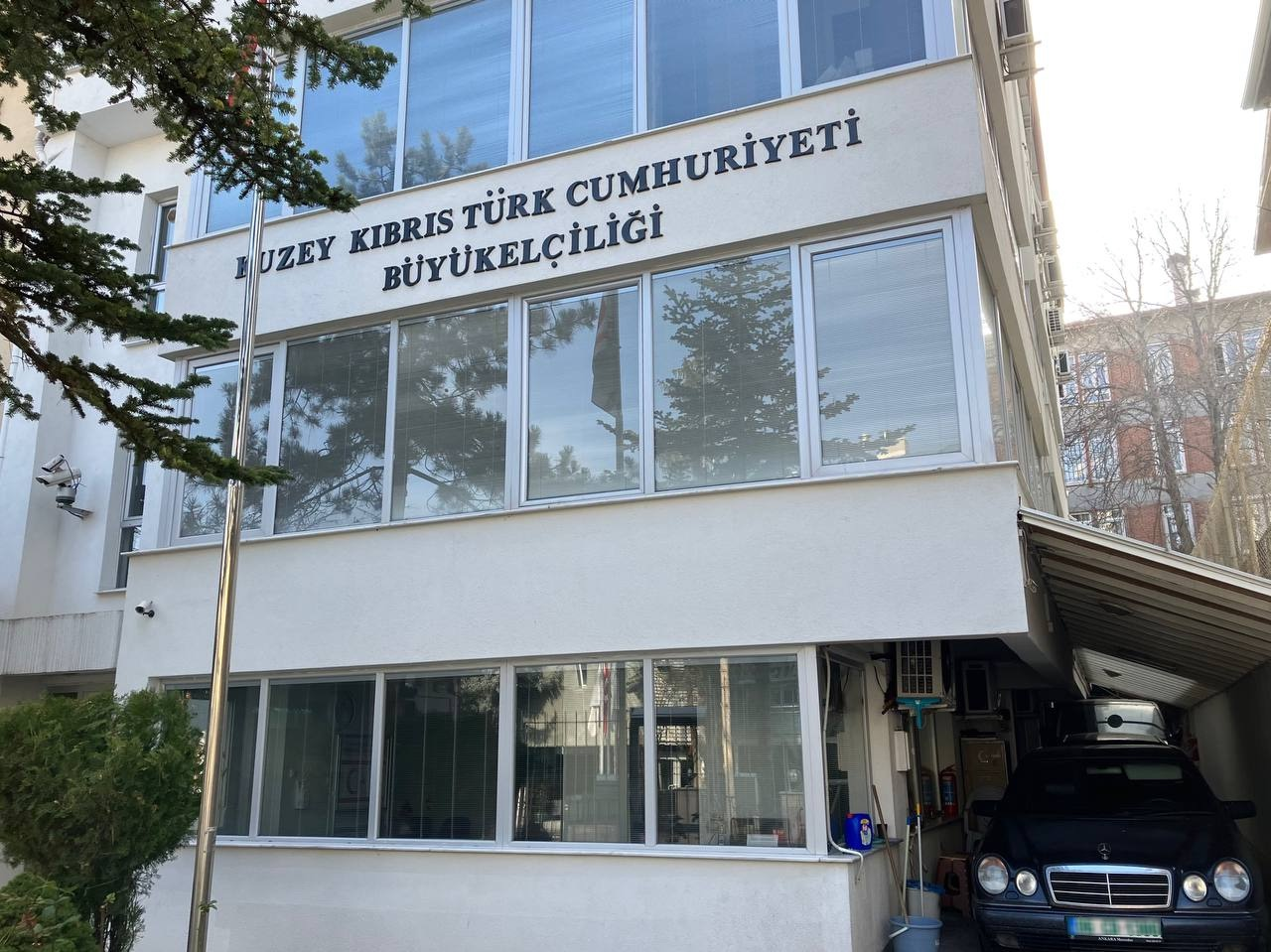
- Location: Ankara, Turkey
- Address: Rabat Sokak No: 20, Gaziosmanpaşa 06700
- Opening: 17 April 1984
- Ambassador: İsmet Korukoğlu
- Website: ankara.mfa.gov.ct.tr

The Embassy of Northern Cyprus in Ankara is the diplomatic mission of the Turkish Republic of Northern Cyprus to the Republic of Turkey. It is located in the Gaziosmanpaşa district of Ankara.

The incumbent ambassador is İsmet Korukoğlu since 14 September 2022.

The existence of an embassy is controversial as the Republic of Cyprus and the international community see Northern Cyprus as occupied territory. However, Turkey recognizes it as an independent state and maintains diplomatic relations. Northern Cyprus is recognized by the international community as a de facto state.

== History ==
The Embassy of Northern Cyprus in Ankara was established in 17 April 1984, shortly after the declaration of the Turkish Republic of Northern Cyprus. Prior to 1984, the institution existed in various names. In 1966, the Turkish Cypriot Community in Cyprus established an Ankara Office, which became the Representation of the Autonomous Turkish Cypriot Administration in Ankara in 1974. In 1975, it was renamed as the Representation of the Head of the Turkish Cypriot Federated State, and in 1983, it began to serve as an Embassy. Since then, the embassy has played an important role in maintaining diplomatic relations between Northern Cyprus and Turkey.

== Services ==
The Embassy of Northern Cyprus in Ankara provides a range of services to Turkish Cypriot citizens living in Turkey and Turkish citizens who wish to visit or travel to Northern Cyprus. These services include consular services, such as passport and identity document issuance, and assistance with legal and financial issues.

== List of representatives ==
The ambassador is the chief diplomat of Northern Cyprus in Turkey and is responsible for overseeing the embassy's activities and representing Northern Cyprus' interests in Turkey. As of 2023, the Ambassador of Northern Cyprus to Turkey is İsmet Korukoğlu.

Term		Name	Title	Sending Entity
Start date	End date	Name	Title	Sending Entity
01.01.1966	20.06.1970	Ekrem Yeşilada	Bureau Director	Cyprus Turkish Community
20.06.1970	13 February 1975	Rıza Vuruşkan	Bureau Director	Cyprus Turkish Community
13 February 1975	1975	Rıza Vuruşkan	Head Representative	Turkish Federated State of Cyprus
1975	1978	Yavuz Konnolu	Head Representative	Turkish Federated State of Cyprus
1 March 1978	15.08.1982	Cemal Aşkın	Head Representative	Turkish Federated State of Cyprus
15.08.1982	14.11.1983	Peker M. Turgut	Head Representative	Turkish Federated State of Cyprus
15.11.1983	16 April 1984	Peker M. Turgut	Head Representative	Turkish Republic of Northern Cyprus
17 April 1984	16.08.1987	Peker M. Turgut	Ambassador	Turkish Republic of Northern Cyprus
10.09.1987	17.03.1994	Oğuz Ramadan Korhan	Ambassador	Turkish Republic of Northern Cyprus
02.05.1994	31.07.1999	Nazif Borman	Ambassador	Turkish Republic of Northern Cyprus
1999	2004	Ahmet Zeki Bulunç	Ambassador	Turkish Republic of Northern Cyprus
2004	2008	Tamer Gazioğlu	Ambassador	Turkish Republic of Northern Cyprus
2009	2010	Namık Korhan	Ambassador	Turkish Republic of Northern Cyprus
2010	2014	Mustafa Lakadamyalı	Ambassador	Turkish Republic of Northern Cyprus
2014	2018	Fazıl Can Korkut	Ambassador	Turkish Republic of Northern Cyprus
2018	2022	Kemal Köprülü	Ambassador	Turkish Republic of Northern Cyprus
14 September 2022	Incumbent	İsmet Korukoğlu	Ambassador	Turkish Republic of Northern Cyprus

== See also ==
- List of diplomatic missions of Northern Cyprus
- List of diplomatic missions in Turkey
- List of ambassadors of Turkey to Northern Cyprus
- Cyprus problem
