= Cevdet Yılmaz =

Vice President of Turkey since 2023

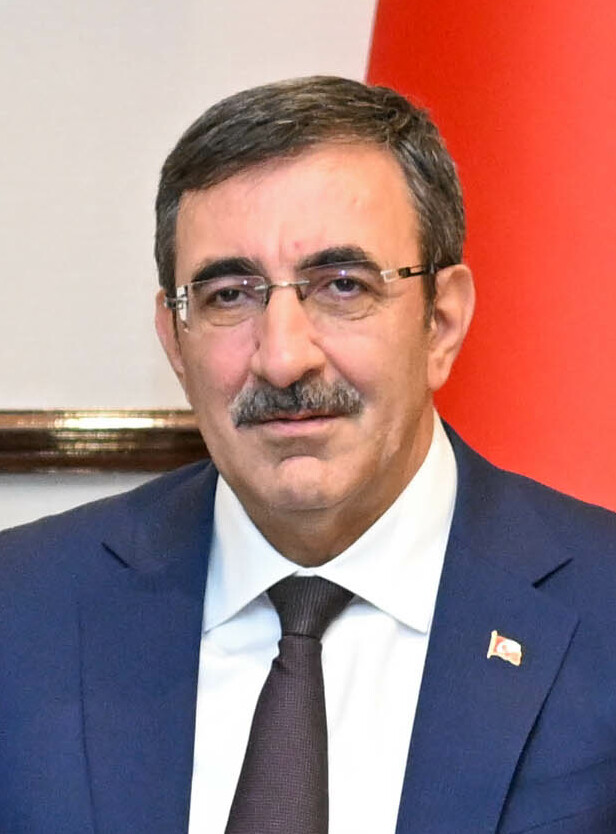
- Yılmaz in 2023

2nd Vice President of Turkey
- Incumbent
- Assumed office 4 June 2023
- President: Recep Tayyip Erdoğan
- Preceded by: Fuat Oktay

Deputy Prime Minister of Turkey
- In office 28 August 2015 – 17 November 2015 Serving with Yalçın Akdoğan, Numan Kurtulmuş, Tuğrul Türkeş
- Prime Minister: Ahmet Davutoğlu
- Preceded by: Ali Babacan
- Succeeded by: Mehmet Şimşek

Minister of Development
- In office 24 November 2015 – 24 May 2016
- Prime Minister: Ahmet Davutoğlu
- Preceded by: Cüneyd Düzyol
- Succeeded by: Lütfi Elvan
- In office 6 July 2011 – 28 August 2015
- Prime Minister: Recep Tayyip Erdoğan; Ahmet Davutoğlu
- Preceded by: Office established
- Succeeded by: Müslüm Doğan

Minister of State
- In office 1 May 2009 – 6 July 2011
- Prime Minister: Recep Tayyip Erdoğan
- Succeeded by: Office abolished

Member of the Grand National Assembly
- In office 22 July 2007 – 14 May 2023
- Constituency: Bingöl (2007, 2011, Nov 2015, 2018); Diyarbakır (June 2015)

Personal details
- Born: 1 April 1967 (age 59) Şabanköy, Bingöl, Turkey
- Citizenship: Turkish
- Party: Justice and Development Party
- Education: Middle East Technical University (BA); University of Denver (MA); Bilkent University (PhD)
- Cabinet: 60th, 61st, 62nd, 63rd, 64th, 67th

Cevdet Yılmaz (born 1 April 1967) is a Turkish politician who has been the 2nd and current vice president of Turkey since 2023. Previously, he served as a Deputy Prime Minister of Turkey in the interim election government formed by Prime Minister Ahmet Davutoğlu from 28 August to 17 November 2015. He previously served as the Minister of Development from 2011 to 2015 and again from 2015 to 2016.

== Early life and education ==
Cevdet Yılmaz was born on April 1, 1967, in Şabanköy, Bingöl to a Zaza family. After completing high school in Bingöl in 1983, Yılmaz graduated with high honors from the Department of Public Administration in the Faculty of Economics and Administrative Sciences at Middle East Technical University in 1988. Yılmaz graduated from the Department of International Relations at the University of Denver in 1994. He later earned a doctorate from the Department of Political Science and Public Administration at Bilkent University.

== Career ==
In 1989, he started working at the State Planning Organization (Turkish: Devlet Planlama Teşkilatı). In 2003, he was appointed Director General of EU Relations at the organization.

In the elections of 2007, Yılmaz was elected as deputy of Bingöl. On 1 May 2009 he was appointed as the State Minister in the second cabinet of Erdoğan. On 6 July 2011 Yılmaz became Minister of Development in the third cabinet of Erdoğan. He was Chairman of the Turkish Parliament's Planning and Budget Commission between November 2020 and June 2023.

On 3 June 2023 he was appointed vice president of Turkey.

== Personal life ==
Yılmaz is married and has two children. He speaks Turkish, English, Kurdish and Zazaki.

Political offices
Preceded by Fuat Oktay	Vice President of Turkey; 2023–present	Incumbent
