= Council of Judges and Prosecutors =

Disciplinary body of the legal system of the Republic of Turkey

The Council of Judges and Prosecutors (Turkish: Hâkimler ve Savcılar Kurulu; HSK), previously known as the Supreme Board of Judges and Prosecutors (Turkish: Hâkimler ve Savcılar Yüksek Kurulu; HSYK), is the disciplinary body of the legal system of the Republic of Turkey and the national council of the judiciary of Turkey. It was established under the 1982 Constitution of Turkey and significantly amended by the Turkish constitutional referendum, 2010 (including an expansion from 7 members to 22). After 2017 constitutional referendum, members are reduced to 13.

The Council currently consists of the thirteen members: seven appointed by the Parliament from high courts and lawyers, and four by the President from civil and administrative judges and prosecutors, the Minister of Justice, and the Ministry Undersecretary. The three branches —the legislative, executive, and judicial— of state as well as practicing lawyers are represented in the Council. Thus, the shaping of the judicial body, through the appointments, is carried out by all the authorities together.

== History ==
The current Council of Judges and Prosecutors was created by the 1982 Constitution, which merged two previously separate predecessor bodies — the High Council of Judges, established in 1961, and the High Council of Prosecutors, established separately alongside it — into a single institution. Both predecessor bodies operated under an earlier constitutional order that the 1982 Constitution repealed in its entirety.

=== 1924 Constitution: Absence of judicial self-government ===
The 1924 Constitution recognised the formal independence of judges but did not secure their tenure, leaving dismissal to ordinary legislation. The only advisory body, the Council of Separation (Ayrıma Meclisi), established by the Law on Judges of 1934, could advise the Minister of Justice on promotions but held no independent authority over appointments. Under the Republican People's Party single-party government (1923–1950) this weakness caused little practical difficulty but it became consequential when the Democrat Party came to power in 1950: legislation in 1953 and 1954 was used to compulsorily retire or remove judges regarded as loyalists of the old regime, extending ultimately to members of the Court of Cassation. These purges provided the direct impetus for the constitutional judicial councils established in 1961.

=== Predecessor bodies (1961–1982) ===
==== 1961 Constitution: Two separate councils ====
The 1961 Constitution, enacted following the 1960 military coup, established two distinct constitutional bodies: the High Council of Judges (Hâkimler Yüksek Kurulu) for the judiciary, and a separate High Council of Prosecutors. The High Council of Judges comprised eighteen regular and five substitute members drawn from the Court of Cassation, first-category judges elected by their peers, and the Grand National Assembly and Senate. The Minister of Justice could attend meetings but had no vote. Scholars have characterised this as a co-option model, representing the most autonomous form of judicial self-government Turkey has known.

==== 1971 Amendments: curtailed autonomy ====
Constitutional amendments following the 1971 military intervention centralised power and reduced the High Council of Judges' membership to eleven, drawn exclusively from the Court of Cassation. The Minister of Justice was given the right to chair meetings and vote, substantially curtailing the earlier autonomy of the body.

=== The current body (1982–present) ===
==== 1982 Constitution: High Council of Judges and Prosecutors ====
The 1982 Constitution, enacted following the 1980 military coup, merged the separate councils for judges and prosecutors into a single body, the High Council of Judges and Prosecutors (Hâkimler ve Savcılar Yüksek Kurulu, HSYK). The Minister of Justice became permanent Chair, the Ministry Undersecretary became an ex officio member without whom the Council could not meet, and total membership fell to seven, appointed by the President from candidates nominated by the supreme courts. The Inspection Board responsible for supervising judicial conduct was placed within the Ministry of Justice rather than the Council, a position that persisted until 2010.

==== 2010 Constitutional Referendum ====
The 2010 constitutional referendum expanded the Council to twenty-two members. For the first time, first-category judges and prosecutors elected ten representatives from among their own number. Further seats were drawn from the supreme courts, the Justice Academy, and lawyers and law professors appointed by the President; the Minister and Undersecretary retained their seats. The Council gained institutional and budgetary autonomy from the Ministry, its own Inspection Board, and — for the first time — public disclosure of disciplinary decisions. The Minister was barred from attending substantive chamber sessions. The Venice Commission welcomed the transfer of powers from the Ministry to the Council while maintaining concerns about the Minister's residual chairmanship.

==== 2013–2014: Corruption crisis and counter-reforms ====
In December 2013, corruption investigations implicating associates of the government triggered a political crisis. The government alleged that supporters of the Gülen movement had infiltrated the judiciary and police and were pursuing politically motivated prosecutions. Law No. 6524 (2014) gave the Minister of Justice power to reassign Council chamber members and immediately replaced the Secretary General, chief inspectors and senior staff with ministerial appointees. The Constitutional Court subsequently annulled these provisions as unconstitutional, but the ruling had no retroactive effect. The government also moved to alter the balance within the chamber responsible for appointments, transfers and reassignments (the First Chamber), by moving resistant members to other chambers and replacing them, after which that chamber issued a series of decrees reassigning hundreds of judges and prosecutors in cities where relevant investigations were under way.

Separately, the government established the Criminal Peace Judgeships (Sulh Ceza Hâkimlikleri) in June 2014, single-judge courts with powers to order wiretaps, arrests, seizures and pre-trial detentions. The International Commission of Jurists noted widespread concern within the Turkish legal community about the independence of these courts, whose judges were appointed by the reconstituted chamber.

==== 2016: Post-coup purges ====
On the night of the failed coup attempt of July 2016, the Council convened and suspended 2,745 judges and prosecutors — including several of its own members — without individual evidentiary assessments. Emergency decree-laws subsequently authorised mass dismissals on grounds of alleged links to terrorist organisations, bypassing ordinary procedural safeguards. The terms of all members of the Court of Cassation and the Council of State were terminated by law and both courts reconstituted within ten days.

==== 2017 Constitutional Referendum: Council of Judges and Prosecutors ====
The April 2017 constitutional referendum, part of Turkey's transition to an executive presidential system, renamed the body the Council of Judges and Prosecutors (Hâkimler ve Savcılar Kurulu, HSK) and reduced its membership from twenty-two to thirteen. For the first time since 1971, no members are elected by their judicial peers. The amendments also terminated the existing membership early, with new appointments taking place in May 2017.

== Election of members ==
1982–2010	2010–2017	2017–current
	4 appointed by President	
3 members; 3 candidates elected by Court of Cassation for each position, selected by President	3 elected by Court of Cassation	3 appointed by Grand National Assembly from Court of Cassation
2 members; 3 candidates elected by Council of State for each position, selected by President	2 elected by Council of State	1 appointed by Grand National Assembly from Council of State
	1 elected by Turkish Justice Academy	3 appointed by Grand National Assembly amongst lawyers from universities
	7 elected by civil judges and prosecutors	3 appointed by President from civil judges and prosecutors
	3 elected by administrative judges and prosecutors	1 appointed by President from administrative judges and prosecutors
Minister of Justice
Ministry of Justice Undersecretary
7	22	13

== List of members ==
Year	Minister of Justice	Ministry of Justice Undersecretary	Court of Cassation	Council of State	Turkish Justice Academy/Universities	Civil judges and prosecutors	Administrative judges and prosecutors
2018	Abdulhamit Gül (19 July 2017–present)	Selahaddin Menteş (17 October 2017–present)	Yaşar Şimşek (16 May 2017–present); Alp Arslan (16 May 2017–present); Mehmet Ademoğlu (16 May 2017–present)	Cafer Ergen (16 May 2017–present)	Hamit Kocabey (16 May 2017–present); Songül Yazar (16 May 2017–present); Ali Cengiz Köseoğlu (16 May 2017–present)	Mehmet Yılmaz (19 May 2017–present); Mehmet Akif Ekinci (19 May 2017–present); Hüseyin Şahin (19 May 2017–present)	Halil Koç (19 May 2017–present)
2017	Bekir Bozdağ (24 November 2015 – 19 July 2017)	Kenan İpek (24 Nov 2015–present)	Yaşar Şimşek (16 May 2017–present); Alp Arslan (16 May 2017–present); Mehmet Ademoğlu (16 May 2017–present)	Cafer Ergen (16 May 2017–present)	Hamit Kocabey (16 May 2017–present); Songül Yazar (16 May 2017–present); Ali Cengiz Köseoğlu (16 May 2017–present)	Mehmet Yılmaz (19 May 2017–present); Mehmet Akif Ekinci (19 May 2017–present); Hüseyin Şahin (19 May 2017–present)	Halil Koç (19 May 2017–present)

== Structure and Functions ==
The CJP conducts procedures concerning the civil and administrative judiciary judges and prosecutors which include: Admission to the profession, appointment, transfers, granting temporary authorisations, promotion, allocation as first class, distributing cadres, making decisions about those who are not considered suitable to continue to perform their profession: rendering decisions about disciplinary punishments and suspension from office; and to issue circulars concerning the issues within its authority. Decisions of the CJP concerning dismissal of judges and prosecutors are subject to judicial review.

=== Plenary Session ===
The Plenary Session of the CJP comprises the President of the Council and all members. Its responsibilities include electing the Acting President and Chamber presidents; examining appeals against Chamber decisions; making final determinations on jurisdictional disputes between Chambers; determining the ethical conduct principles that judges and prosecutors must observe; approving the Council's strategic plan; electing members to the Court of Cassation and the Council of State; and appointing senior Inspection Board and Secretariat General personnel.

Since the 2017 constitutional amendments the Council operates through two Chambers:

=== First Chamber ===
The First Chamber handles matters including day-to-day personnel administration of judges and prosecutors, including appointments, transfers, granting of temporary and permanent authorisations, distribution of posts, and all leave permissions other than annual and casual leave. It also oversees the referral of complaints and inspection matters to the Inspection Board, and determines the division of labour between regional courts.

=== Second Chamber ===
The Second Chamber handles matters including promotions and first-class classification; disciplinary investigation and prosecution outcomes; decisions concerning those considered unsuitable to remain in the profession; and decisions on withdrawal and termination of office.

=== Secretariat General ===
The Secretariat General is the Council's administrative and financial service unit. It is headed by a Secretary General appointed by the President of the Council and five Deputy Secretaries General. A body of rapporteur judges, appointed from those with at least five years' judicial experience, also serves within the Secretariat General.

The Secretariat General's functions include conducting the Council's administrative operations; representing the Council through lawyers in judicial and administrative proceedings; maintaining the credentials and personal files of judges and prosecutors; managing archive services; overseeing leave and retirement procedures; and ensuring the National Judicial Network Information System (UYAP) is maintained in connection with Council matters. The Secretariat General is organised into approximately 29 specialised bureaus covering areas including decrees, discipline, promotion, judicial ethics, human rights, foreign relations, information technology, legislation, and judicial efficiency.

=== Inspection Board ===
The Inspection Board carries out inspections of judges and prosecutors on behalf of the Council under the supervision of the Council's President. The Board's principal duties are to: inspect whether judges and prosecutors perform their duties in accordance with laws and applicable regulations; to investigate whether they commit offences by reason of or during the exercise of their duties; and to conduct examination and investigation proceedings; and to conduct the necessary research and examination into the legislative deficiencies and malfunctions in the implementation of certain matters to submit proposals to the Council regarding potential remedies.

== Commentary ==
Aidul Fitriciada Azhari, the chairman of the Judicial Commission of Indonesia, praised the Supreme Board's efforts during the 2016 Turkish purges as a positive example of external oversight of a judicial system.

However, the European Commission’s Turkey 2016 Report (part of the EU enlargement monitoring process, providing an official assessment of compliance with EU standards relating to democracy, rule of law, human rights, and judicial independence) stated that "The HSYK is therefore widely perceived to be the executive’s main means of controlling the judiciary. More transparency in the HSYK’s work and strict adherence to procedures are needed to strengthen not only the Council’s credibility but also public trust in the judiciary ... In the days and weeks following the attempted coup, 3508, i.e. one fifth of the total number of judges and prosecutors were suspended by HSYK and 3390 subsequently dismissed. 2 386 judges and prosecutors have been detained: 2229 of first instance, 109 from Court of Cassation, 41 from Council of State, two members of the Constitutional Court, and five members of the HSYK. Following the coup attempt, a large number of new judges were appointed only within two weeks. The magnitude and rapidity of the measures taken raise questions on criteria applied. These large-scale dismissals as well as large-scale recruitments of new judges and prosecutors raise a serious challenge to the performance and independence of the judiciary."

In December 2016, the General Assembly of the European Network of Councils for the Judiciary (ENCJ) suspended the observer status of the HSYK, finding that it no longer met the ENCJ's requirement of independence from the executive and legislature. The ENCJ had monitored developments in the Turkish judiciary since 2014 and had raised concerns through successive declarations before concluding that the mass dismissal of judges and prosecutors following the July 2016 coup attempt rendered the HSYK's continued membership untenable. Four years later, the ENCJ noted that the situation had deteriorated further, stating that the renamed Council of Judges and Prosecutors was "a Council in name only."

On 9 December 2024 the Venice Commission published an Opinion on the Composition of Turkey's Council of Judges and Prosecutors at the request of the Monitoring Committee of the Parliamentary Assembly of the Council of Europe. It assessed the CJP against European and international standards for judicial independence. The Commission found serious structural deficiencies. Chief among them was that none of the CJP's thirteen members are elected by their judicial peers. The presence of the Minister of Justice as President of the CJP and the Deputy Minister as a full voting member were also identified as particularly problematic. Key recommendations include ensuring at least half of CJP members are elected by their peers, removing the Minister of Justice and Deputy Minister from the body, establishing constitutional guarantees of security of tenure for members, and introducing judicial review of all CJP decisions. Other observers have also commented on the impact of the current CJP structure upon judicial independence.

On 12 March 2026 the United Nations Special Rapporteur on the independence of judges and lawyers wrote to the Turkish Government expressing concerns and seeking information about the objectivity and transparency of recruitment processes for judges and prosecutors, and arrangements for ensuring the diversity of appointments-particularly at a senior level.

== See also ==
- 2013 corruption scandal in Turkey
- Association of Judicial Unity
