= Presidency of Strategy and Budget =

Turkish goveryment agency

- Cumhurbaşkanlığı Strateji ve Bütçe Başkanlığı

Agency overview
- Formed: 24 July 2018; 6 years ago
- Preceding agency: Ministry of Development
- Employees: 835
- Agency executive: Naci Ağbal, President
- Parent department: Office of the President of Turkey
- Website: www.sbb.gov.tr
- Agency ID: SBB

In Turkey, Presidency of Strategy and Budget (Turkish: Cumhurbaşkanlığı Strateji ve Bütçe Başkanlığı) was established following the 2018 parliamentary election after which the Ministry of Development was closed. The Ministry of Development and the Ministry of Finance's Budget Directorate (Turkish: Bütçe Genel Müdürlüğü) were merged within the Presidency. Development Agencies formerly operating under the Ministry of Development started operating under the Ministry of Industry and Technology.

To accelerate the economic and social development of the Republic of Turkey, the Presidency of Strategy and Budget, which carries out its activities with the mission of making development balanced and sustainable, it carries out various duties in the fields of COMCEC and international development cooperation, especially in the preparation of basic policy documents, development of sectoral and thematic policies and strategies, preparation and implementation of the central government budget, coordination of plans, programs, resource allocation, implementation of budgets, policies and strategies.

The first president of the Presidency of Strategy and Budget was Naci Ağbal, the former Minister of Finance.

== List of presidents ==
No.	Name	Tenure started	Tenure ended
1	Naci Ağbal	24 July 2018	7 November 2020
2	İbrahim Şenel	7 November 2020	Incumbent
