= Halil İbrahim Akça =

Turkish diplomat

His Excellency Halil İbrahim Akça
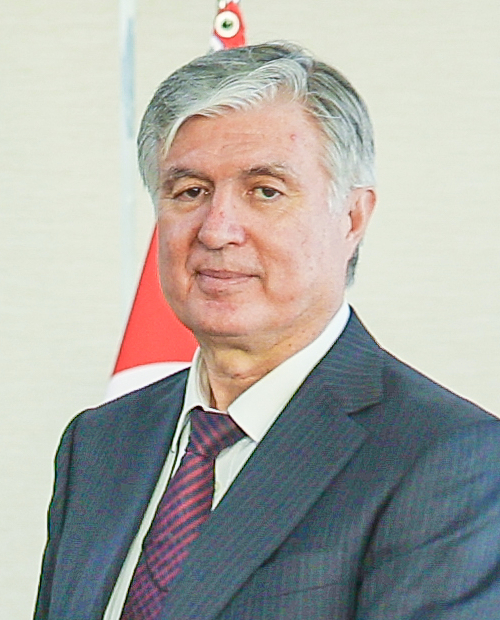

Turkish Ambassador to Brazil
- Incumbent
- Assumed office 2022

11th Secretary-General of the Economic Cooperation Organization
- In office 13 August 2015 – July 2018
- Preceded by: Shamil Alaskerov
- Succeeded by: Hadi Soleimanpour

Personal details
- Born: 1963 (age 62–63)
- Children: 3
- Education: Istanbul Technical University; University of Delaware

Halil İbrahim Akça is the Turkish ambassador to Brazil, and was the 11th Secretary General of the Economic Cooperation Organization (ECO).

== Education ==
Akça graduated with an undergraduate degree in Electronics and Communication Engineering from Istanbul Technical University in 1988. In 1994 he received a Master of Arts degree in Economics from the University of Delaware. He has published several papers on government economic policy and planning based on Turkish data.

== Career ==
Akça held several positions within the Turkish government, including Under-Secretary of the State Planning Organization in 2009, and was a member of several Turkish government boards. He was the Turkish ambassador to Northern Cyprus from 2011 to 2015. Akça led the Economic Cooperation Organization as Secretary General from August 2015 through July 2018. In 2022 he was named the Turkish ambassador to Brazil.
