= Order of precedence in Turkey =

Relative preeminence of officials for ceremonial purposes

The Turkish order of precedence, the following is the list of Turkish order of precedence approved by the President of Turkey and administered by the Directorate of Protocols of the Ministry of Foreign Affairs.

This is a hierarchy of officials in the Turkish Republic used to direct protocol for domestic ceremonies, hence it does not involve any foreign dignitaries. It also does not contain the President of Turkey, since he is the head of the state and assumed to be at the top of the list naturally.

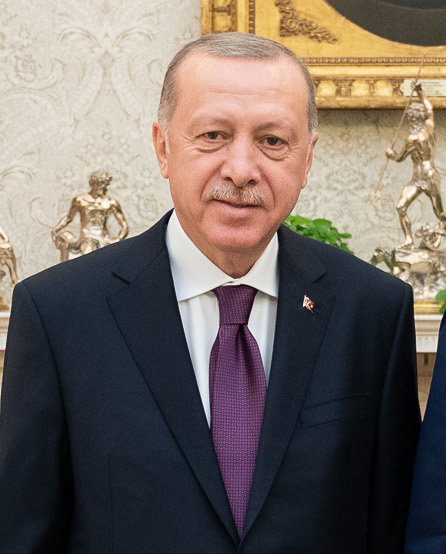
Recep Tayyip Erdoğan President of Turkey since 28 August 2014

== Turkish order of precedence list ==
1. Speaker of the Grand National Assembly
2. Vice President of Turkey
3. Leader of the political party group with the most members in the Grand National Assembly
4. Leader of the Main Opposition Party
5. President of the Constitutional Court
6. Former presidents
7. First President of the Court of Cassation
8. President of the Council of State
9. Ministers of the Government (in alphabetical order of ministry names)
10. Chief of the Turkish General Staff
11. Commanders of the Turkish Armed Forces
12. Generals/Admirals
13. President of the Council of Higher Education
14. Deputy Speaker of the Grand National Assembly
15. Leaders of the political parties that have groups in the Parliament
16. Clerk members and administrative members of the Parliament
17. Leaders of the political parties that are represented in the Parliament
18. Chairperson and Deputy Chairman's of the political party groups in the Parliament
19. Deputy Chairpersons of the political parties that have groups in the Parliament
20. General Secretaries of the political parties that have groups in the Parliament
21. Members of the Parliament
22. President of the Court of Accounts
23. Chief Public Prosecutor of the Court of Cassation
24. President of the Turkish Bars Association
25. Chief Prosecutor of the Council of State
26. Deputy Presidents of the Constitutional Court
27. President of the Court of Jurisdictional Disputes
28. Justices of the Constitutional Court
29. Deputy First Presidents of the Court of Cassation
30. Deputy President of the Council of State
31. Deputy President of the Council of Judges and Prosecutors
32. Deputy Chief Public Prosecutor of the Court of Cassation
33. President of the Supreme Electoral Council
34. President of the High Council of Arbitrators
35. General secretary of the National Security Council
36. President of the National Intelligence Organization
37. President of the State Supervisory Council
38. President of Strategy and Budget
39. President of the Defense Industries
40. President of the Directorate of Communications
41. President of the Directorate of Religious Affairs
42. President of the Directorate of State Archives
43. President of the Directorate of National Palaces
44. President of the Directorate of Presidential Administrative Affairs
45. General Secretary of the Parliament
46. Presidents of the Office of the Presidency
47. Deputy ministers
48. Chief Auditor of the Ombudsman Institution
49. Governor of Ankara
50. Rectors of universities in Ankara
51. Commander of the Garrison of Ankara
52. Mayor of Ankara Metropolitan Municipality
53. Deputy Presidents of the Policy Boards under the Presidency
54. Members of the Council of Higher Education
55. Lieutenant generals/Vice admirals
56. President of the Atatürk High Institution of Culture, Language and History
57. President of the Radio and Television Supreme Council
58. President of the Turkish Academy of Sciences
59. Governor of the Central Bank of the Republic of Turkey
60. President of the Competition Authority
61. President of the Privatization Administration
62. Chairperson of the Capital Markets Board
63. Deputy General Secretaries of the Parliament
64. Major generals/Rear admirals
65. Court of Cassation of Department Heads and members
66. Council of State of Department Heads and members
67. Court of Accounts of Department Heads and members
68. President of the Turkey Energy, Nuclear and Mining Research Institute
69. President of the Scientific and Technological Research Council of Turkey
70. Deputy Rectors of Universities in Ankara
71. Members of the Supreme Electoral Council
72. Members of the State Supervisory Council
73. Auditors of the Ombudsman Institution
74. Brigadier generals/Commodores
75. General secretary of the Council of Higher Education
76. President of the Turkish Statistical Institute
77. General manager of the Anadolu Agency
78. General manager of the Turkish Radio Television Corporation
79. General manager of the Meteorology
80. Director General of Foundations
81. General Director of Land Deeds and Cadastral
82. General Managers of the Ministry
83. Deans and Deputy Deans of the faculties of the universities in Ankara
84. Heads of Professional Organizations in the nature of public institutions in Ankara
85. Heads of Civil and Military Associations

== See also ==
- Politics of Turkey
- Women in Turkish politics
- Order of precedence
