= Presidential Complex (Turkey) =

Residence of the President of the Republic of Turkey

- Cumhurbaşkanlığı Külliyesi
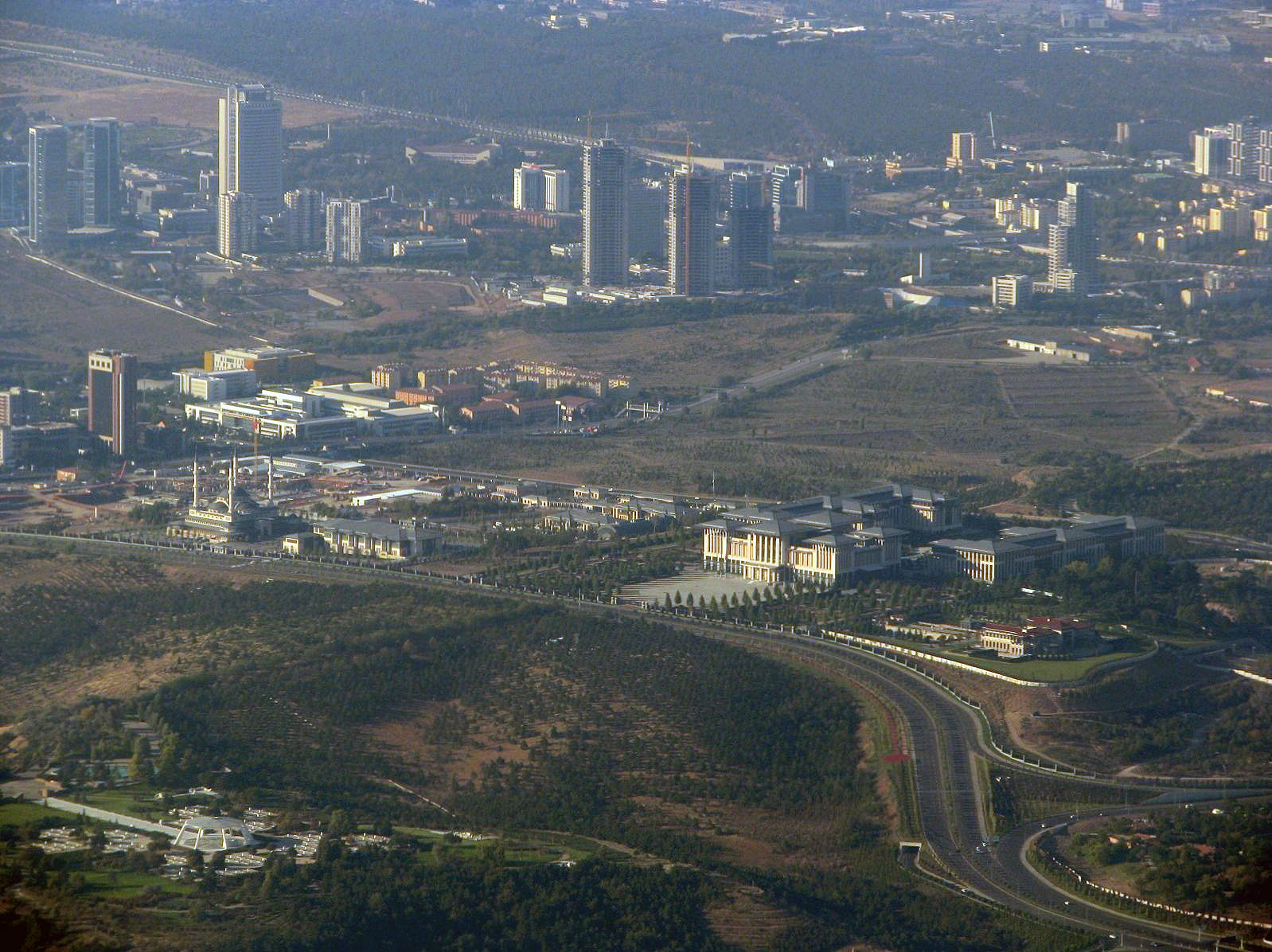
- Aerial view of the complex

General information
- Location: Ankara, Turkey
- Coordinates: 39.9308°N 32.7989°E
- Opened: 29 October 2014
- Cost: ~US$1.2 billion

Technical details
- Grounds: 150,000 sqm

Design and construction
- Known for: Presidential use

The Presidential Complex (Turkish: Cumhurbaşkanlığı Külliyesi) is the presidential residence of the Republic of Turkey. The complex is located in the Beştepe neighborhood of Ankara, inside the Atatürk Forest Farm.

In accordance with President Recep Tayyip Erdoğan's "New Turkey" concept, it was envisaged that the Çankaya Mansion would become the prime ministerial complex and the president would move to the newly built palace. It was formally inaugurated as the official residence of the president by Erdoğan on the country's Republic Day, 29 October 2014.

President Erdoğan proposed to call the new presidential residence Cumhurbaşkanlığı Külliyesi, referring to a traditional complex centered on a mosque. This was formally adopted as the residence's official name on 3 July 2015. The building cost was double the initial estimate of more than US$600 million. The Presidential Complex is home to the country's largest library with five million books.

== History ==
The ground plan for the Presidential Complex started in 2011. The Council of Ministers decided that the Gazi compound should be turned into an "Urban Transformation and Development Project Area" for the purpose of constructing a Prime Ministry Building in 2012. Soon after, the construction of the project started with the cooperation of the Ministry of Culture and Tourism, the Ministry of Environment and Urbanization, the Ministry of Forestry, the Housing Development Administration TOKİ, Ankara Metropolitan Municipality and the Cultural and Natural Heritage Preservation Board.

On 2 September 2014, it was announced that the complex will function as the official residence of the Turkish Presidency, and that the Çankaya Mansion (the previous Presidential residence) will serve as the official residence of the Prime Minister.

The inaugural opening of the complex was on the 91st anniversary of the founding of the republic of Turkey on 29 October 2014.

The complex was bombed on 15 July 2016 as part of the failed coup d'état attempt.

=== Design influences ===
The buildings inside the complex are designed in accordance with Seljuk and Ottoman architectural traits, forming a synthesis.

=== Construction ===
The building was constructed inside the Atatürk Forest Farm (AOÇ), which was established by Mustafa Kemal Atatürk in 1925. In 1937, President Atatürk, acting as the Mareşal, donated the farm to the state. In 1992 the farm was designated a first-degree protected site meaning that no construction should be done within its territory. On 4 March 2014, an administrative court in Ankara ordered the suspension of the palace's construction. The suspension order was supported by the Turkish Council of State on 13 March. Erdoğan ignored the decision, saying "Let them tear it down if they can. They ordered suspension, yet they can't stop the construction of this building. I'll be opening it; I'll be moving in and using it".

Finance minister Mehmet Şimşek, quoted by Turkey's Hürriyet newspaper, said the construction cost of the palace would be 1.37bn ₺ ($615m), most of which had already been spent, but another $135m had been budgeted for it in 2015. In December 2014, Turkey's state-owned Housing Development Administration (TOKİ) refused to divulge the actual construction cost on the grounds that releasing the information could hurt Turkey's economy, citing Article 17 of the Law on the Provision of Information. Tezcan Candan, head of the Turkish Chamber of Architects' Ankara branch, said the final cost could be over 5 billion lira.

The government has been criticised for the presidential palace due to its high cost and lavish furnishings. Opposition parties have ramped up their objection to Turkey's presidential palace, set to cost more than half a billion US dollars. The complex was pejoratively called Ak Saray (meaning "White Palace") as a reference to Erdoğan's Justice and Development Party (AKP). Due to its construction being barred by the courts yet continuing regardless and alleged corruption, it is regularly referred to by some opposition politicians and supporters as the Kaçak Saray (meaning "Illegal Palace").

According to the Ankara branch of the Chamber of Architects, the cost of the imported window glass is more than TL 700 million. The figure, based on estimates provided by glass suppliers on the cost of glass with similar qualities, is about half of the total official cost of the entire palace, TL 1.37 billion. There was also controversy due to the extensive use of imported marble at Euro 3,000 per square meter. According to a statement released by the Ankara branch of the Union of Chambers of Turkish Engineers and Architects (TMMOB), Bizassa marble imported from Italy will be used to decorate pools, bathhouses, saunas, and spas within the palace. The presidential palace had a natural gas bill of TL 2.4 million between October 2014 and May 2015, according to records released to the public. TMMOB also claims that 63 elevators and a number of carpets in the palace cost a total of TL 31.2 million, while gold-inlaid glasses found at the palace reportedly cost TL 1,000 each. Critics call the lavishness a waste of budgetary funds while Erdoğan has shrugged off the criticism, insisting that the palace, which he said will be called the "Presidential Complex", boosts Turkey's reputation. As of 2023, the Turkish Presidential Complex spent 1.08 billion Turkish liras ($39 million) in the first six months of 2023 for public procurement, 20 times more than the entire year of 2022.

On 10 July 2015, the Turkish Council of State found that the construction of the palace violated the law and ordered it to be vacated. However, the Presidency has stated that the decision is ultra-vires, citing Article 105(2) of the Constitution, which reads "No appeal shall be made to any judicial authority, including the Constitutional Court, against the decisions and orders signed by the President of the Republic on his/her own initiative".

=== First guests ===
The inaugural opening of the presidential residence was on the 91st anniversary of the Republic. On the occasion of the celebrations of the Republic Day, the president welcomed officials of all branches of the government.

Pope Francis was the first head of state hosted at the new Presidential Palace on 28 November 2014, during his visit to Turkey. Turkish architects had called on the Pope not to attend the ceremony at the "unlicensed" Presidential Complex. On 1 December 2014, Russian President Vladimir Putin was the second foreign guest welcomed with a ceremony in front of the new palace.

=== Exhibitions ===
On occasion of the Turkish Quit Smoking Day on 9 February 2016, the palace hosted a collection of over 215 cigarette boxes, which Erdoğan had collected from people he compelled to quit smoking. Erdogan is well known to be an anti-smoking activist and compelled politicians to quit smoking as well as ordinary people he met on the street.

The "Presidency's Scissors collection" was announced as the largest scissors collection in the world in October 2022. In it, about 800 scissors Erdogan had used in inauguration ceremonies were on display. Erdogan began to collect inaugurational scissors in 2007, older ones were provided by project administrators.

== Buildings in the Presidential Complex ==
The complex consists of the main building and two support buildings to be used for meetings with visiting heads of state and dignitaries. It covers an area of 300,000 m^{2} (3,200,000 sq ft). Inspired by Seljuk architecture, the Presidential Complex has guesthouses, a botanical garden, a situation room with satellite and military communications systems, bunkers able to withstand biological, nuclear and chemical weapons attack, a park and a congress center. The complex employs high security measures with additional insulation against wiretapping. To prevent the planting of bugs, one of the offices in the complex has no electrical outlets.

Şefik Birkiye was the lead architect of the complex.

=== Main buildings ===
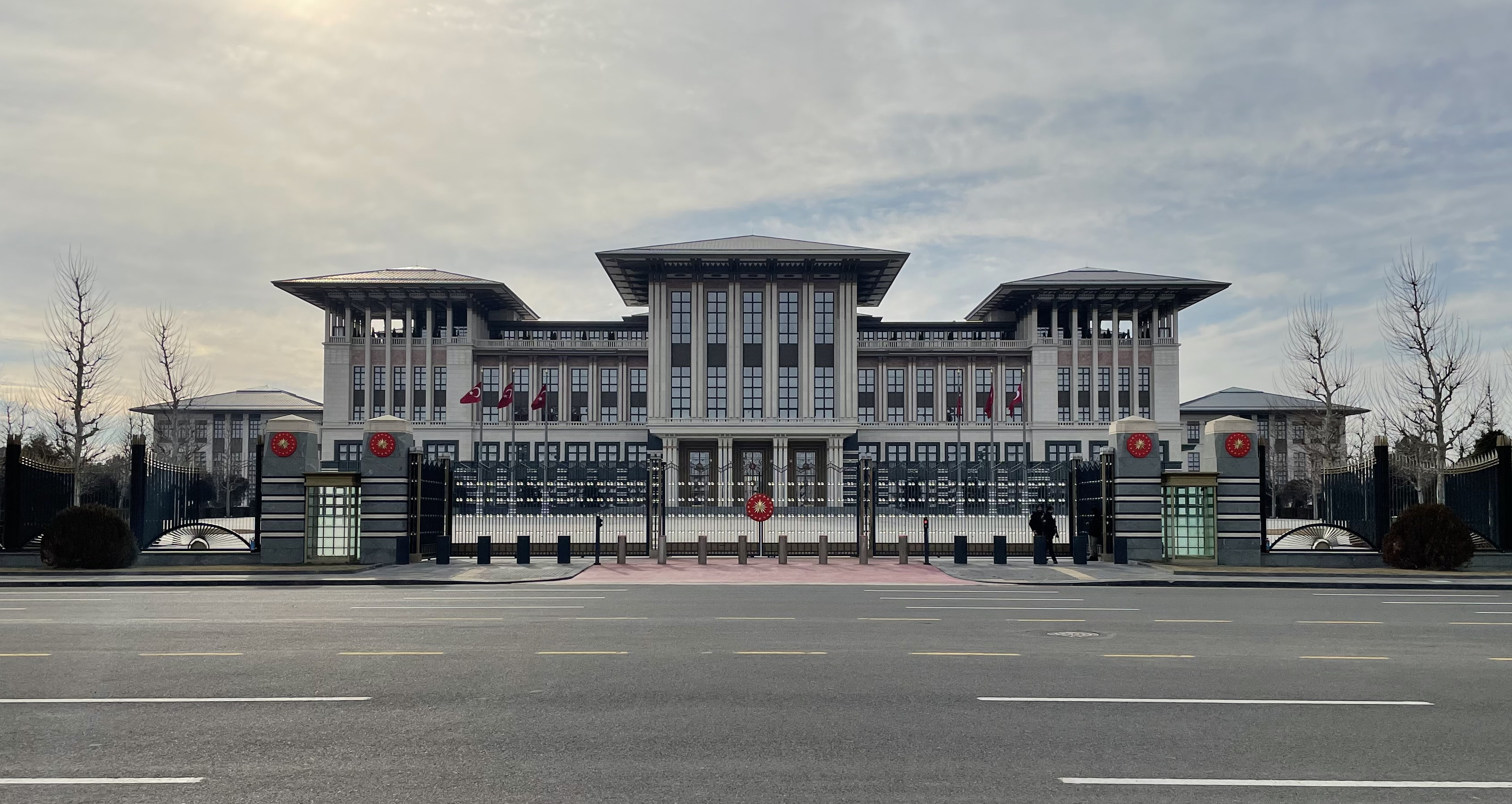
Main Buildings of the Presidential Complex

Known as the Cumhurbaşkanlığı Sarayı, the Presidential Palace is the main set of buildings of the Presidential Complex. The Work Office for the president is situated in this building. The Palace has at least 1,150 rooms, and a laboratory to detect nuclear, biological and chemical hazards which may be used as an attack against the President.

=== Beştepe People's Mosque ===
Located in the Presidential Complex, the mosque was opened to worship on 3 July 2015, with the participation of President Recep Tayyip Erdoğan. The mosque has a capacity of roughly 3 thousand people to worship at the same time. The area of the mosque and its surroundings cover 5,177 square metres (55,720 ft^{2}). There are 4 minarets and the height of each minaret is 59.30 metres (194.6 ft). It reflects Turkish and Ottoman architecture.

=== Nation's Library ===
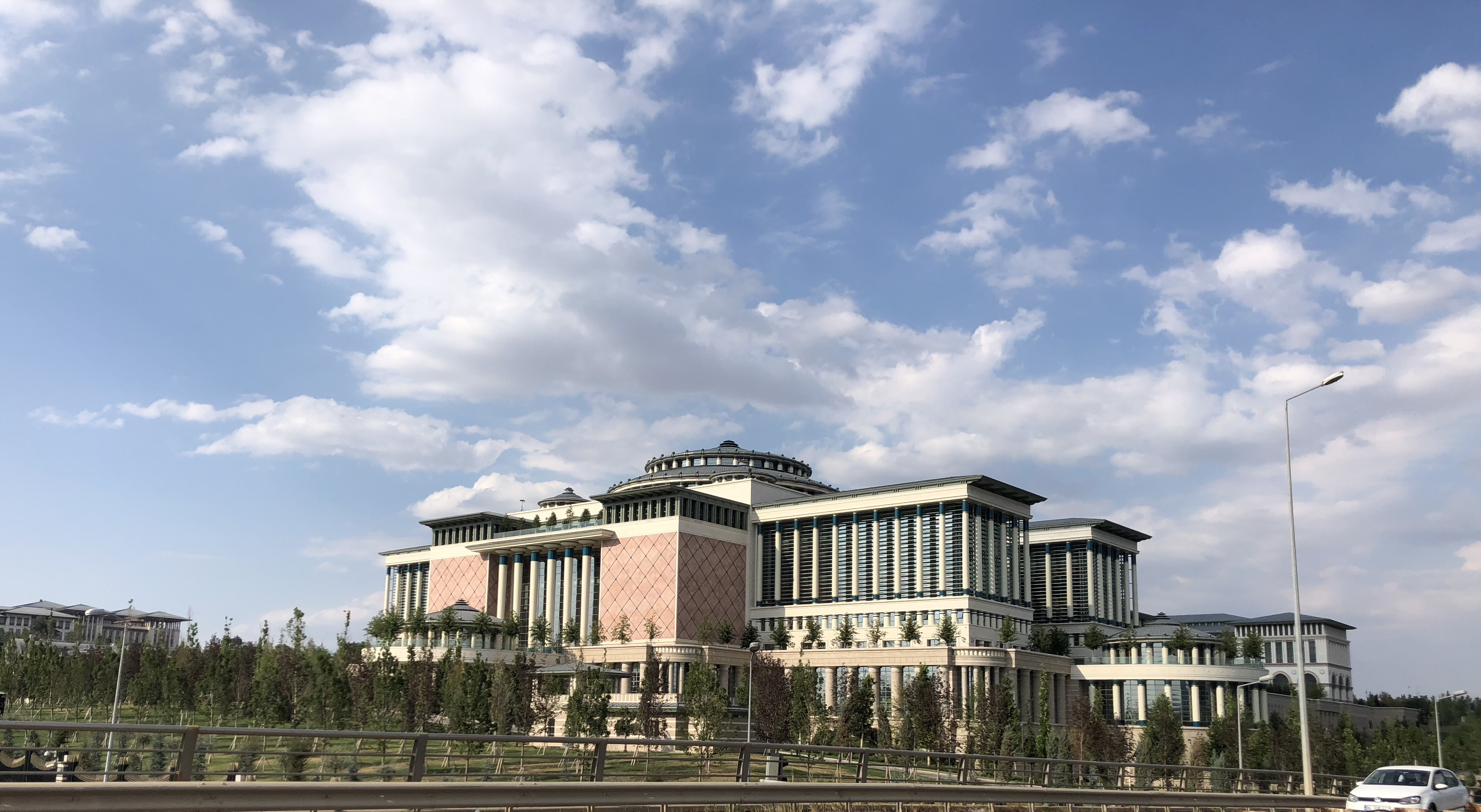
A view of the Nation's Library from the highway

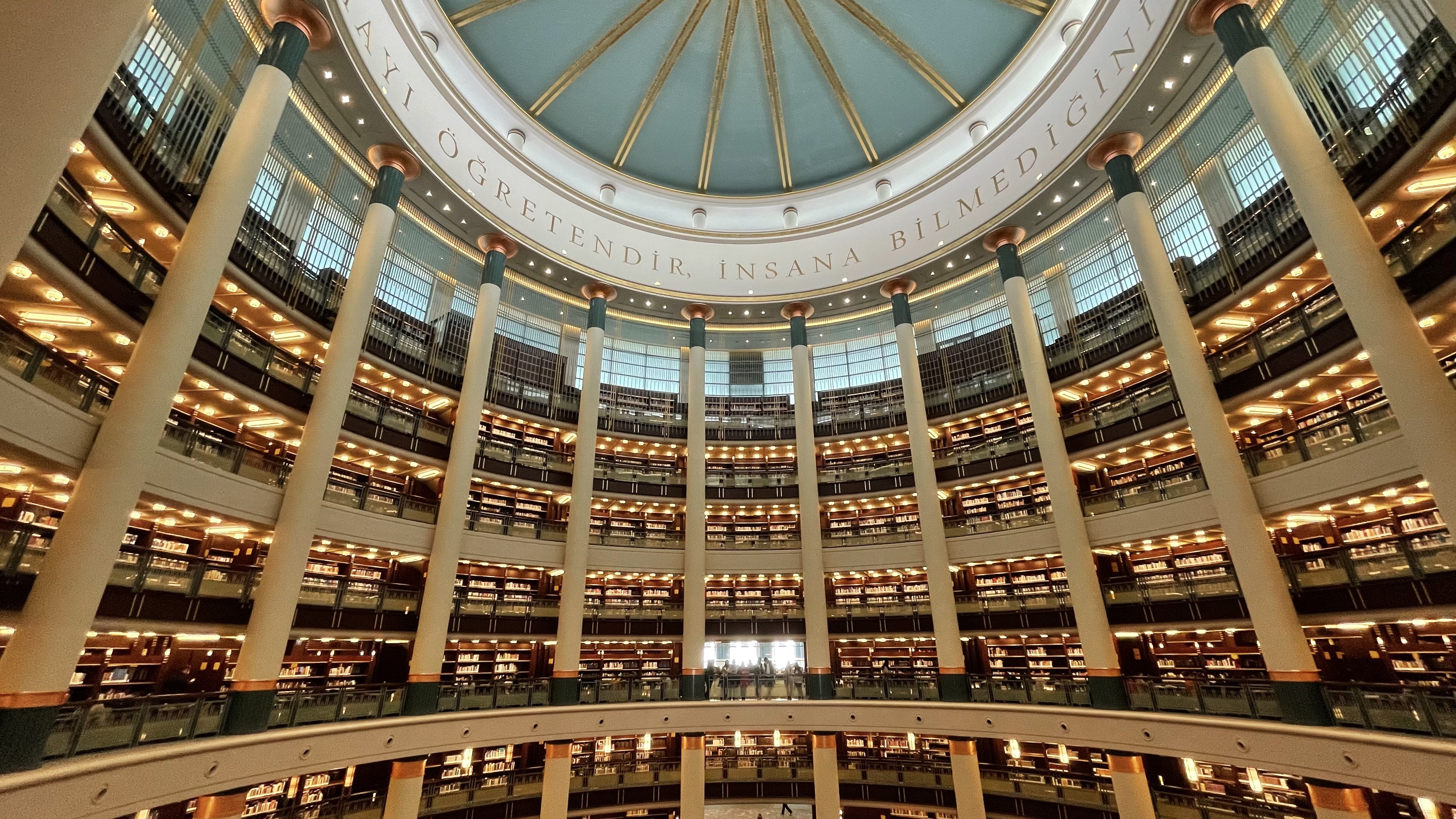
Interior of the Nation's Library

The Nation's Library of the Presidency (Turkish: Cumhurbaşkanlığı Millet Kütüphanesi) also referred to as the Presidential Library by common people, is the largest library in Turkey, with a collection of over four million books in 134 different languages, and 120 million articles and reports. The Presidential Library, which has the largest incipient collection in the world, was officially inaugurated by President Recep Tayyip Erdoğan on 20 February 2020. In addition to receiving a copy of materials printed in the country, as a depository library, the Presidential Library also receives books, in collaboration with the Foreign Ministry, from every country where Turkey has a diplomatic mission. It is home to the Dīwān Lughāt al-Turk, the first comprehensive dictionary of Turkic languages, compiled in 1072–74 by the Turkic scholar Mahmud Kashgari, among many other manuscripts and rare books.

=== Presidential Residence ===
The Presidential Residence inside the complex, is the official residence of the President of Turkey. Before the building was completed, the presidents were using the Çankaya Mansion as the residence.

=== 15 July Martyrs' Monument ===
The monument opposite the complex was built by the Ankara Metropolitan Municipality to symbolize the July 15 Military Coup attempt. The monument was opened on 16 July 2017 with the participation of President Recep Tayyip Erdoğan. It consists of a total of 4 parts: one nation, one state, one homeland and one flag. The height of the monument is 31 metres (102 ft) and its total area is 2,500 square metres (27,000 ft^{2}). There are 7 human figures representing the citizens of 81 provinces, who fled to the streets on 15 July. 7 people represent 7 geographical regions of Turkey. In the one homeland section, the names of 81 provinces are written.

=== C4I bunker ===
The Presidential Palace complex is said to contain a top secret special operations command and control center housed in a secure bunker. The center has a 143 screen visual command center which correlates data obtained from UAVs, CCTV, TV and 3G transmissions from all 81 provinces of Turkey. The Gendarmerie, Disasters and Emergencies Management Directorate, the Information and Communication Technologies Authority (BTK), Turkish Armed Forces and MIT can provide live feeds to the Presidential Command Center. All data is archived in two special supercomputer servers to enable intelligence agencies to track back the paths of suspects. The Palace C4I system can target, track and follow individuals based on bio-metrics and any 2D image of the target being uploaded into the system.

== Gallery ==
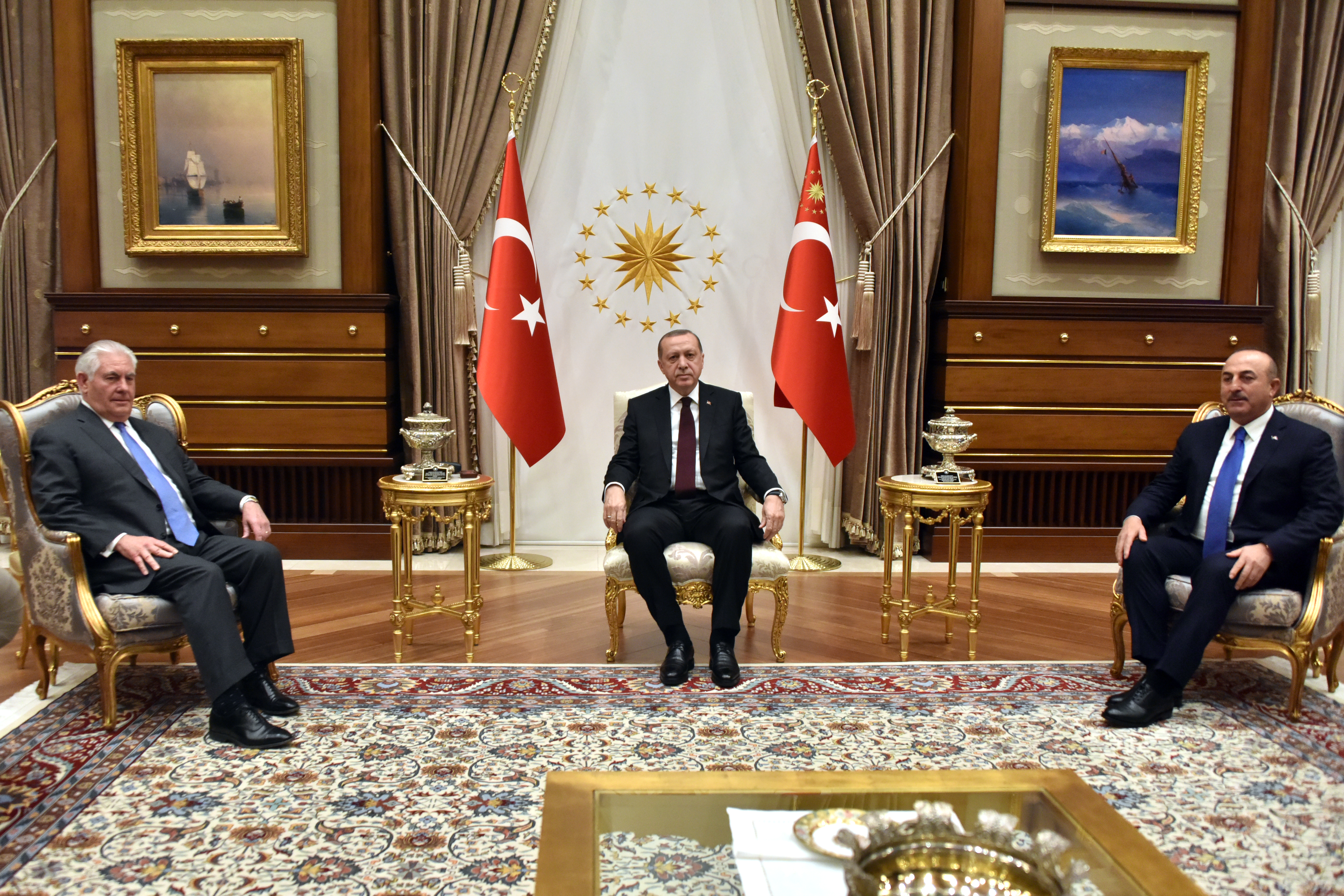
Presidential working room

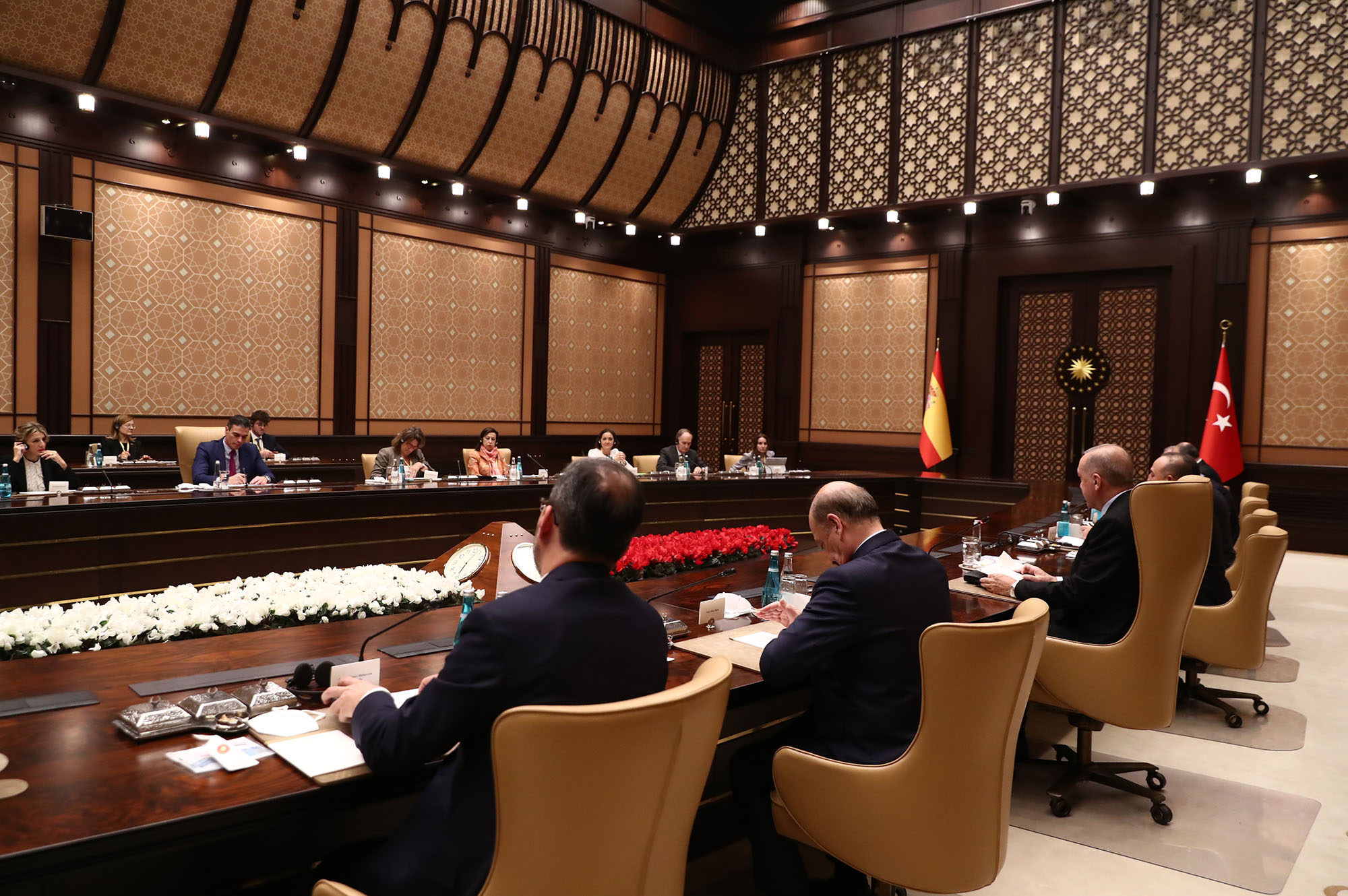
A meeting room

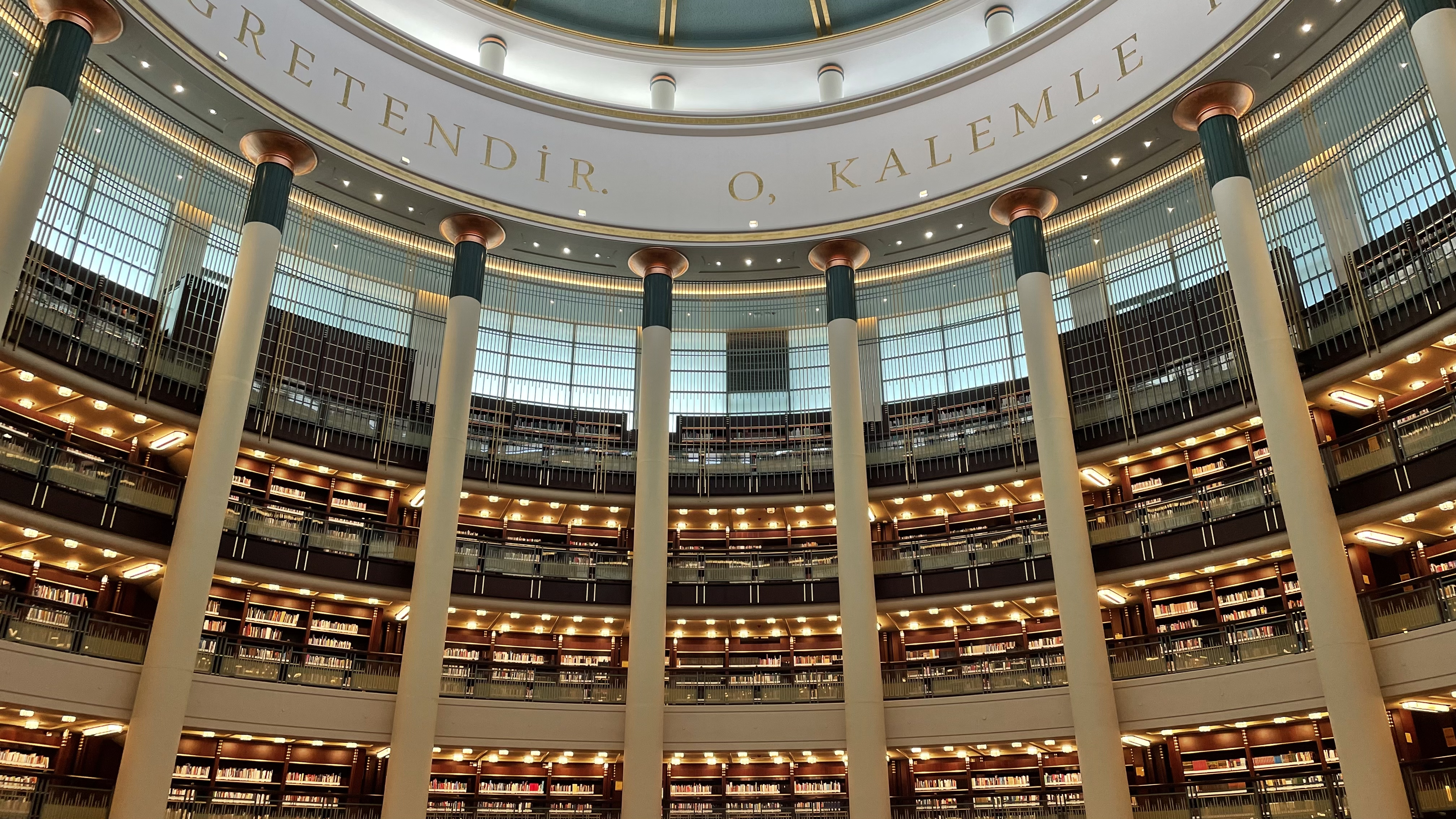
A view in the main hall of the Presidential Library

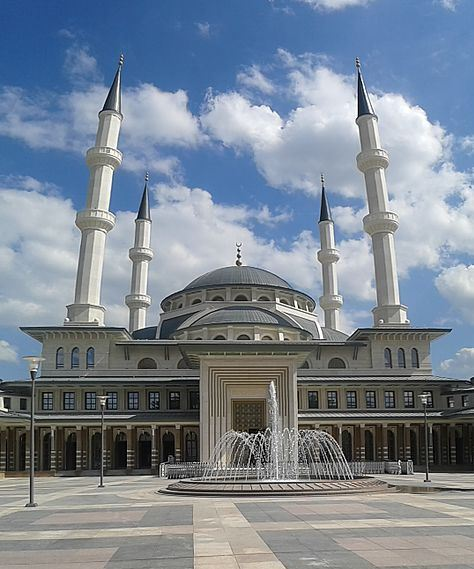
Beştepe Millet Mosque exterior

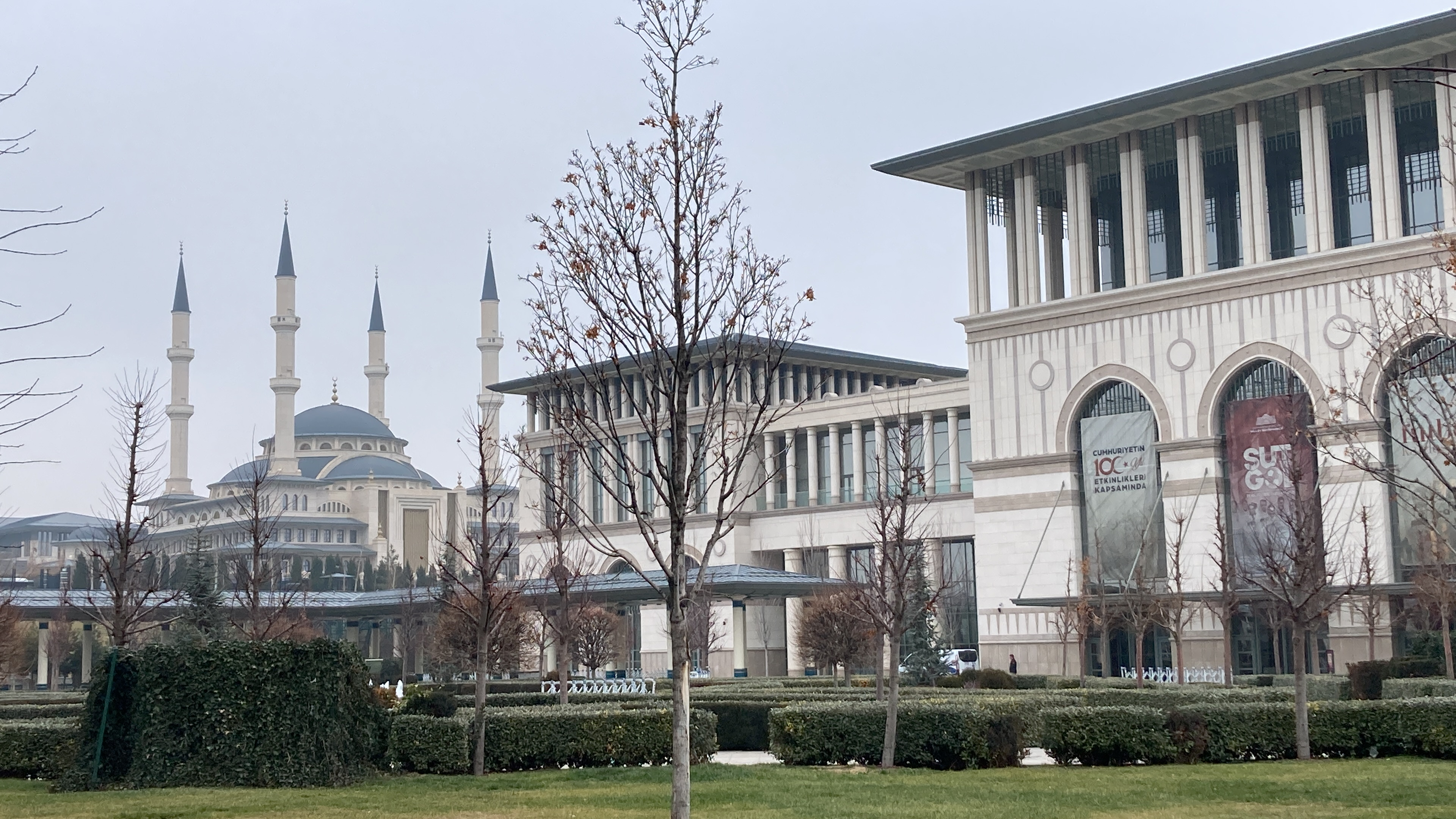
Beştepe Millet Mosque in Presidential Complex of Turkey.

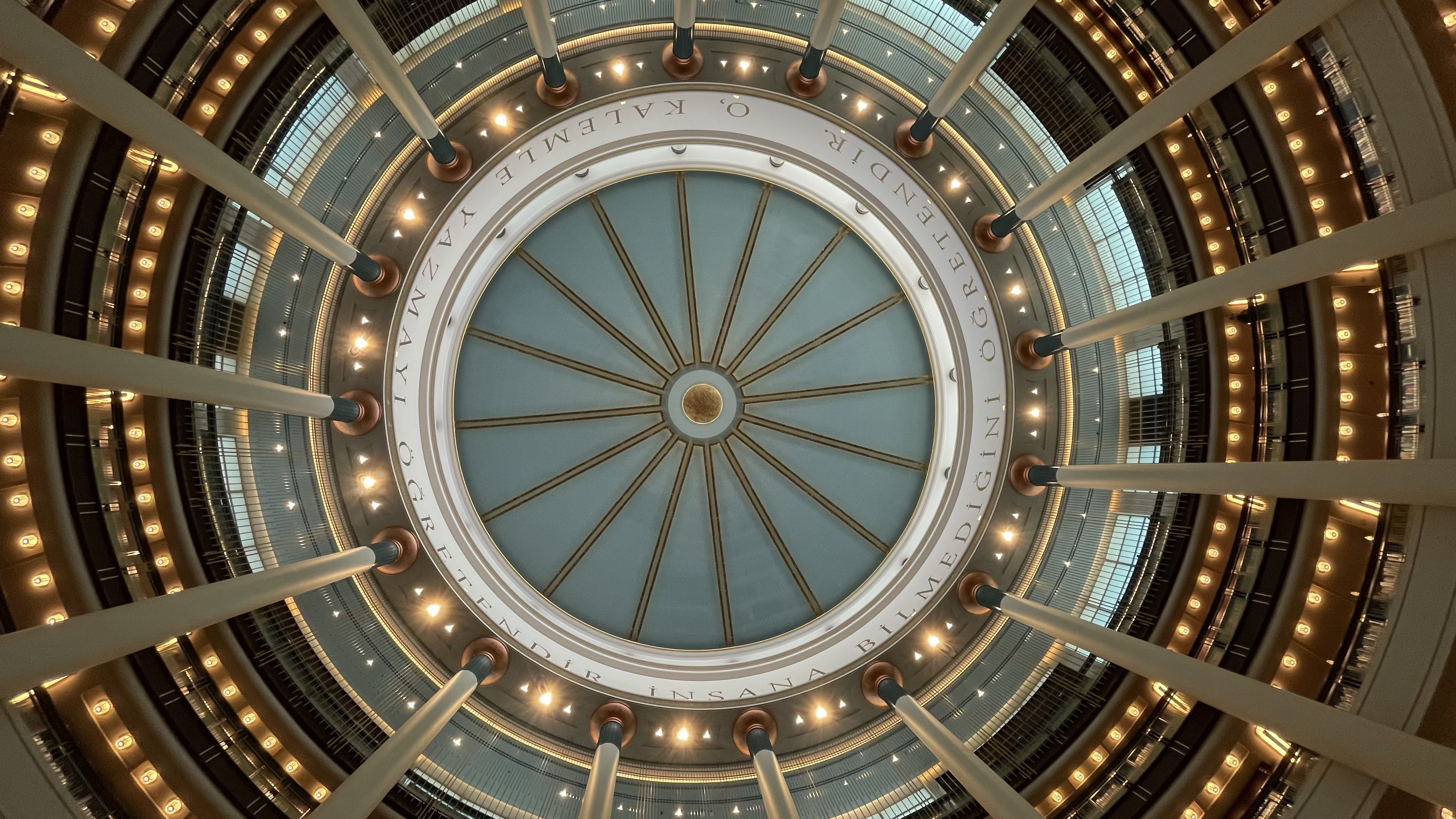
A view of the dome inside the Presidential Library

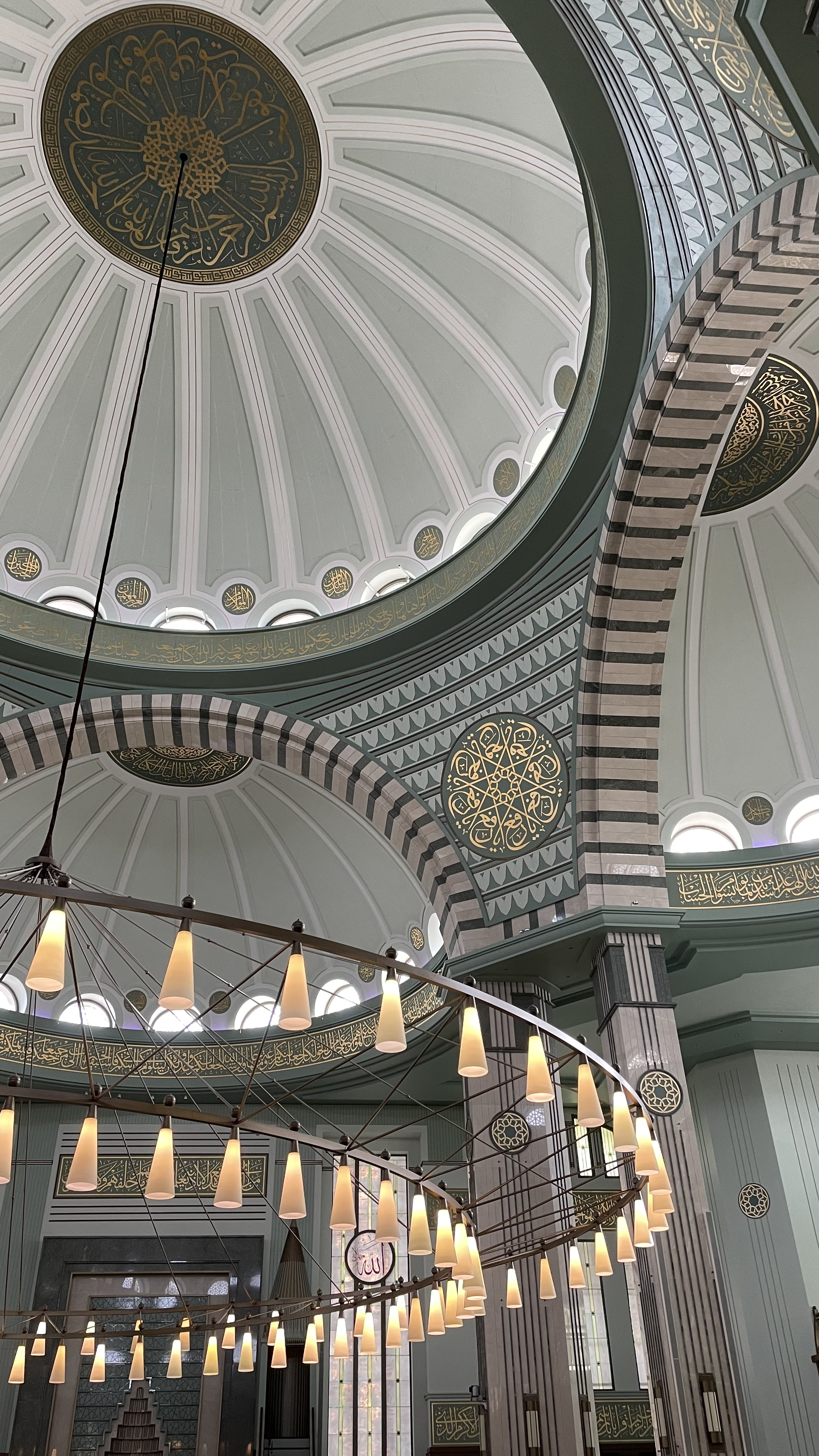
Interior of the Beştepe Millet Mosque

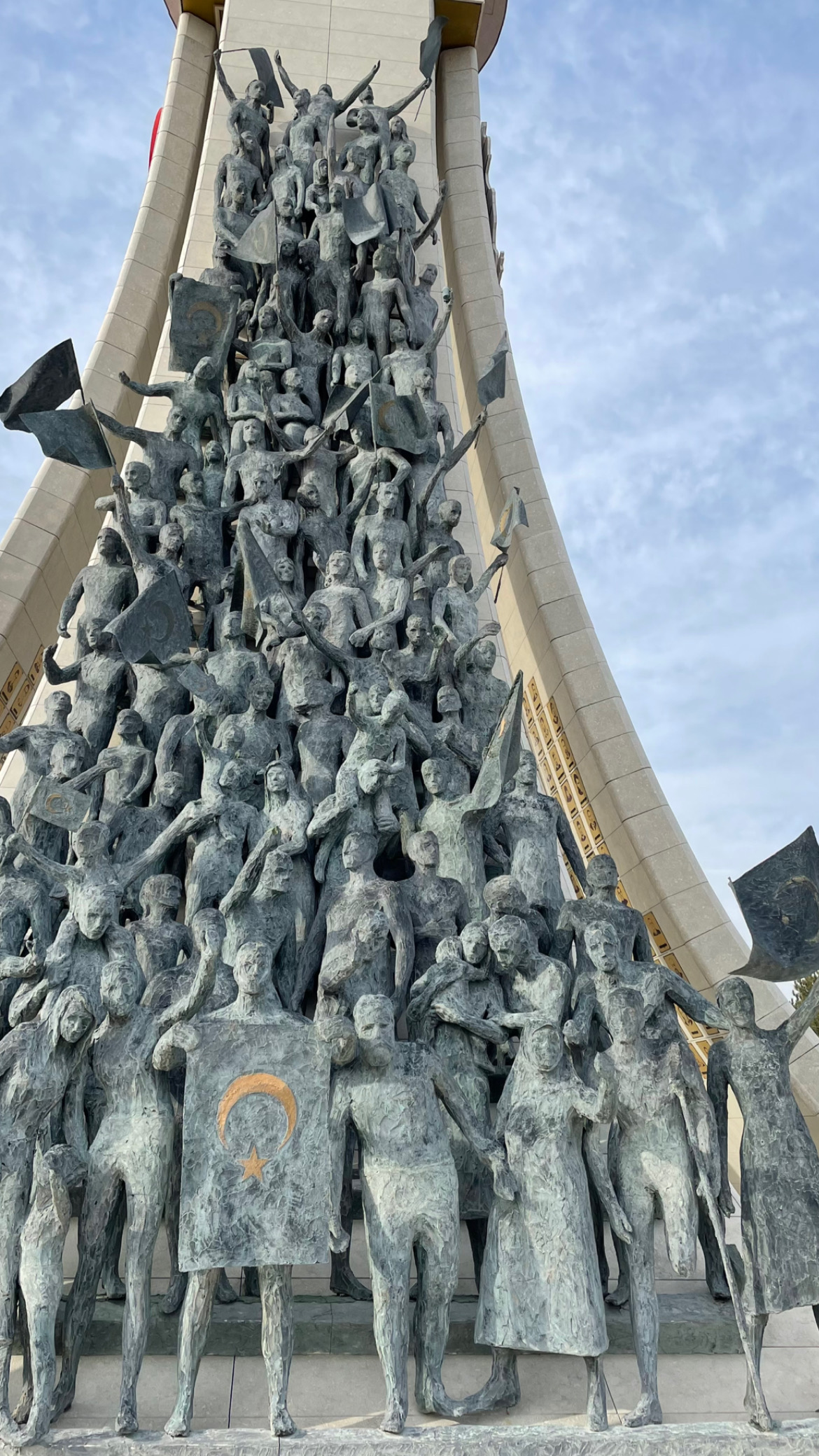
15 July Monument sculpture

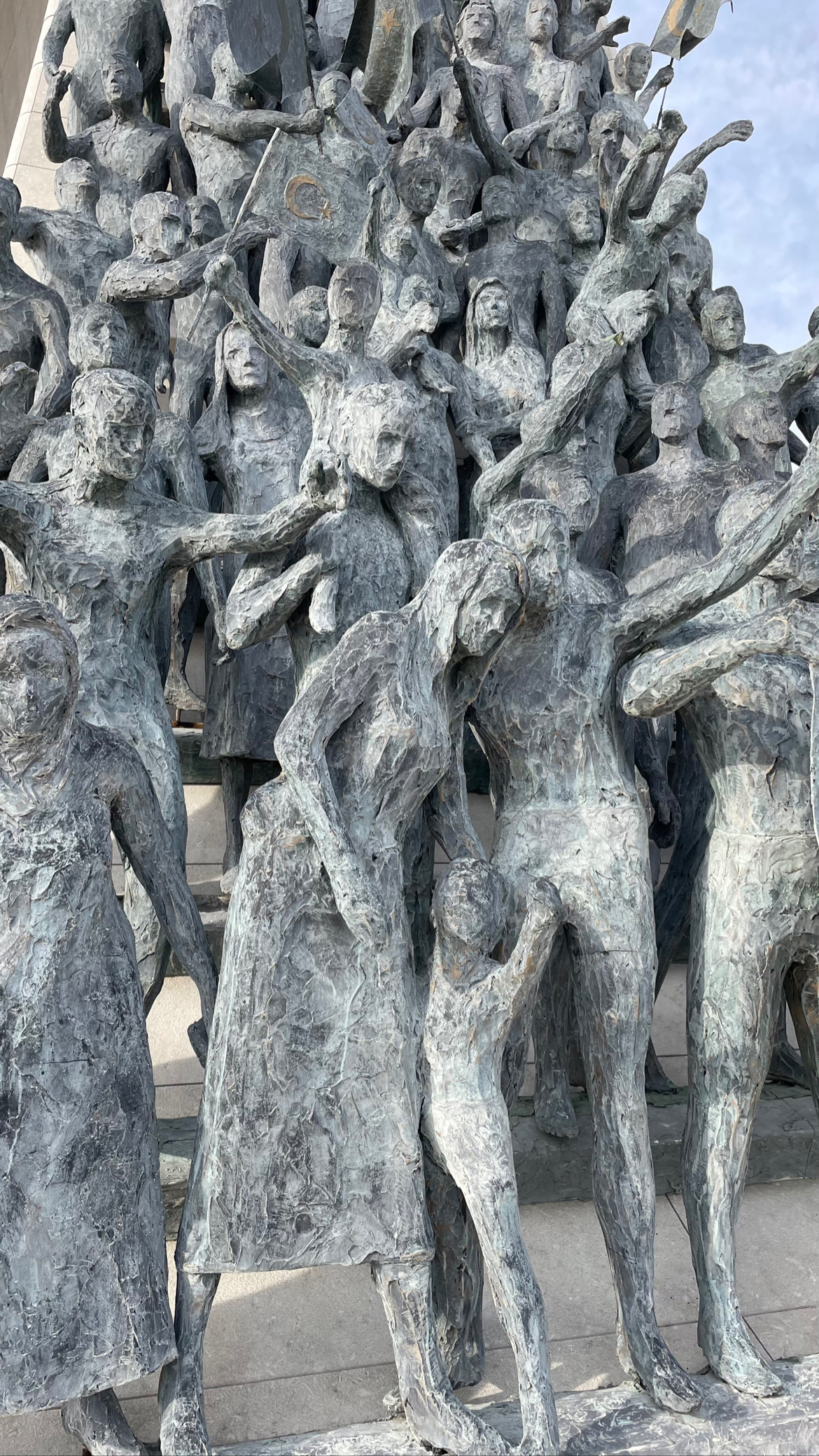
Details of the sculpture

== See also ==
- President of Turkey
