= High Council of Arbitrators of Turkey =

The High Council of Arbitrators (Turkish: Yüksek Hakem Kurulu, YHK, also translated as Supreme Arbitration Board) is a permanent arbitral tribunal in Turkey. It was established in the 1982 Constitution for resolution of conflicts between the employer and employees on collective bargain agreements. The authority is defined in Law no 2822 ratified on 3 May 1986, and can be used for organizations and companies where strike is not allowed by the law. The council has final decision authority on the agreements.

== Structure ==
The structure is based on three bodies, one neutral, one in favor of the employees and one in favor of the employers. Neutral body consist of one expert judge from the High Court of Appeals of Turkey, an external and neutral member appointed by Ministers of the Government, an academician on business law or economics by the Council of Higher Education (Turkey) and a bureaucrat from the Ministry of Labour and Social Security (Turkey).

Employees are represented by two representatives of the labor confederation that has the highest number of members. Employers are represented by a representative of the employer union with highest number of members and a representative appointed by Ministers of the Government for negotiations on civil servants.

== Resolution Structure ==
The decisions are based on documents presented, but the council has right to interview the parties if it is considered that the documentation is not explanatory.

Decisions are based on majority of votes, it tie situations Council Head is favored.
