= Directorate of Presidential Administrative Affairs =

Office of the Turkish civil service

- Cumhurbaşkanlığı İdari İşler Başkanlığı

Agency overview
- Formed: 10 July 2018; 6 years ago
- Preceding agency: Başbakanlık Müsteşarlığı
- Agency executive: Metin Kıratlı, President
- Parent department: Office of the President of Turkey
- Agency ID: İİB

In Turkey, the Directorate of Presidential Administrative Affairs (Turkish: Cumhurbaşkanlığı İdari İşler Başkanlığı) was established following the 2018 parliamentary election after which the Prime Ministry Undersecretariat (Başbakanlık Müsteşarlığı) was dissolved. President of the Directorate of Administrative Affairs is the 'highest-ranking civil servant' in the Republic of Turkey. The first and current president is Metin Kıratlı, who had previously served as the Deputy Secretary General of the President.

== Duties ==
The duties and powers of the Directorate of Presidential Administrative Affairs are as follows:

1. To provide the President with the necessary services in the fulfillment of his duties and exercising his powers, specified in the Constitution.
2. The conduct of relations with the Grand National Assembly of Turkey to do the necessary work to ensure coordination among government agencies and institutions.
3. To carry out the necessary studies for the determination of the principles that will ensure the State Organization to function regularly and effectively.
4. To carry out the necessary studies to ensure coordination in internal security, external security and counter-terrorism organizations.
5. To follow up and evaluate the effects of different studies on the public.

== List of presidents ==
№	Name	Tenure started	Tenure ended
1	Metin Kıratlı	3 August 2018	Incumbent
