= Vice President of Turkey =

Second-highest constitutional office in Turkey

Vice President of The Republic of Türkiye
- Türkiye Cumhuriyeti Cumhurbaşkanı Yardımcısı (Turkish)
- Presidential standard of Turkey

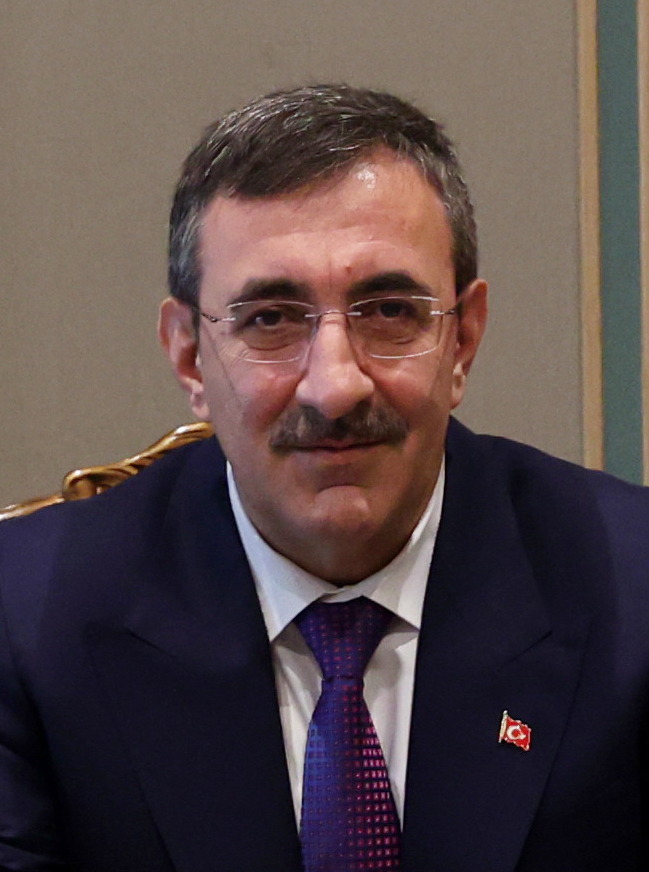
- Incumbent; Cevdet Yılmaz since 4 June 2023
- Executive branch of the Turkish Government
- Status: Deputy head of state Deputy head of government
- Member of: Cabinet; National Security Council; Supreme Military Council; Economic Coordination Council
- Reports to: President
- Residence: Çankaya Mansion
- Appointer: President
- Term length: Five years, renewable once
- Constituting instrument: Constitution of Turkey
- Formation: 9 July 2018; 8 years ago
- First holder: Fuat Oktay
- Salary: ₺260,880 annually

The vice president of Turkey, officially the vice president of the Republic of Türkiye (Turkish: Türkiye Cumhuriyeti Cumhurbaşkanı Yardımcısı), is the second-highest officer in the executive branch of the government of Turkey, after the president. The vice president is also a statutory member of the Cabinet, National Security Council and Supreme Military Council.

Cevdet Yılmaz has been the second and current vice president of Turkey since his appointment to office on 4 June 2023.

== Origin ==
The office of vice president was created with a referendum on constitutional amendments on 16 April 2017 and entered into force after the presidential election in 2018, when the new president took office on 9 July 2018. Following this referendum Turkey changed from a parliamentary republic to a presidential republic. Fuat Oktay was appointed as the first vice president by President Recep Tayyip Erdoğan.

== Constitutional conditions ==
The constitution of Turkey stipulates the following conditions about the vice-presidency:

- The President may appoint one or more vice presidents after being elected.
- If the presidential office becomes vacant for any reason, the presidential election shall be held within forty-five days. The vice president shall act as and exercise the powers of the President until the next president is elected.
- In cases where the President is temporarily absent from their duties on account of illness or travelling abroad, the vice president acts as the President of the Republic and exercises their powers.
- The vice president shall be appointed from among those who are eligible to be a deputy for the Turkish parliament. The vice president shall take oath before the Turkish Grand National Assembly as stated in the Article 81. Members of the Grand National Assembly of Turkey appointed as a vice president lose their membership to the parliament.

== Accountability ==
According to the constitutional amendments approved in the 2017 referendum, the Grand National Assembly may initiate an investigation of the president, the vice president or any member of the Cabinet upon the proposal of simple majority of its total members, and within a period less than a month, the approval of three-fifths of the total members.

The investigation would be carried out by a commission of fifteen members of the Parliament, each nominated by the political parties in proportion to their representation therein. The Commission would submit its report indicating the outcome of the investigation to the Speaker within two months. If the investigation is not completed within this period, the Commission's time renewed for another month. Within ten days of its submission to the Speaker, the report would be distributed to all members of the Parliament, and ten days after its distribution, the report would be discussed on the floor.

Upon the approval of two thirds of the total number of the Parliament by secret vote, the person or persons, about whom the investigation was conducted, may be tried before the Constitutional Court. The trial would be finalized within three months, and if not, a one-time additional period of three months shall be granted. The deputies of the President who are convicted of a crime by the Supreme Criminal Tribunal for a crime that prevents them from being elected shall lose their mandate.

== List of vice presidents of Turkey (2018–present) ==
Political party

Justice and Development Party (AK Party)

No.	Portrait	Name (born-died)	Term			Political party	Previous office
No.	Portrait	Name (born-died)	Took office	Left office	Time in office	Political party	Previous office
1	Fuat Oktay	Fuat Oktay (born 1964)	9 July 2018	4 June 2023	4 years, 329 days	AK Party	Undersecretary to Prime Minister of Turkey
2	Cevdet Yılmaz	Cevdet Yılmaz (born 1967)	4 June 2023	Incumbent	3 years, 123 days	AK Party	Deputy Prime Minister of Turkey
