= Çankaya Mansion =

Mansion located in Ankara

- Çankaya Köşkü
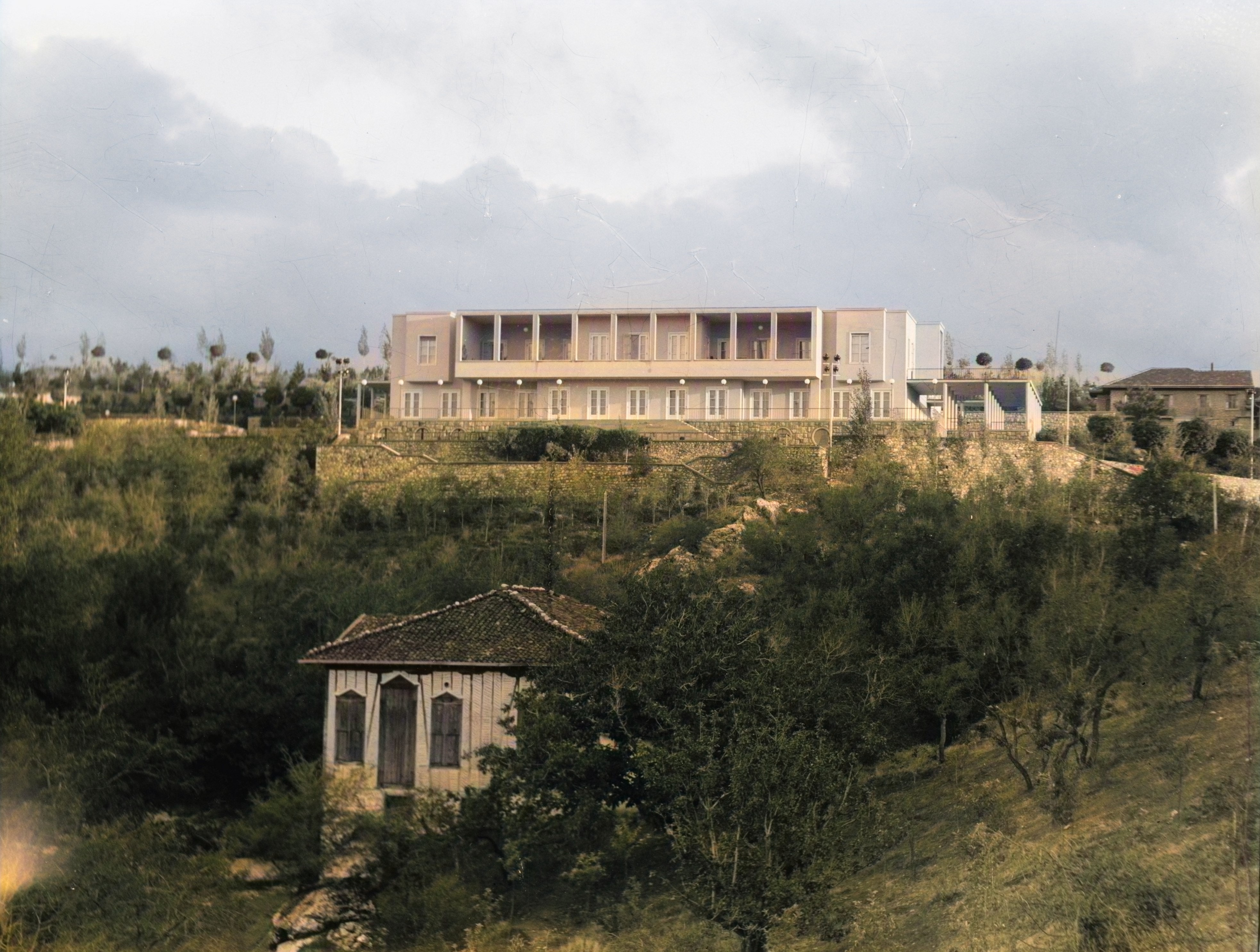
- Facade of the Çankaya Mansion

General information
- Status: Residence of the Vice President(s)
- Architectural style: Traditional Turkish
- Location: Çankaya Neighborhood, Çankaya Street, Çankaya District, Ankara, 06550
- Coordinates: 39°53′21″N 32°51′52″E
- Current tenants: Cevdet Yılmaz, Vice President of Turkey
- Completed: 1932

Technical details
- Size: 195 hectares (480 acres)

Design and construction
- Architect: Clemens Holzmeister

The Çankaya Mansion (Turkish: Çankaya Köşkü) is the official residence of the vice president of Turkey and previously the official residence of the president of Turkey from 1923 to 2014.

Originally, the mansion belonged to the Armenian Kasabian family, who lost possession of it during the Armenian genocide. The property is located in the Çankaya district of Ankara, which lends its name to the palace. The Çankaya Campus is home to several buildings, including the mansion and stretches over 195 hectares (480 acres) of land with its unique place in the history of the Turkish Republic.

The Çankaya Campus houses Atatürk's Museum Mansion, the Çankaya Mansion, the office of the Chief Aide-de-Camp, the Glass Mansion, State Supervision Council, the Financial Affairs and Preservation Directorate buildings, Press Conference Hall, reception halls, fire department building, social facility, garage, greenhouse, artificial turf sports area, tennis court and employee lodgings.

In 2014, the president moved to the newly built Cumhurbaşkanlığı Külliyesi, with Çankaya Mansion becoming the official residence of the prime minister. Since the transition to a presidential system from 2017 onwards, the Çankaya Mansion has served as the official residence of the vice president of Turkey.

== Early history ==
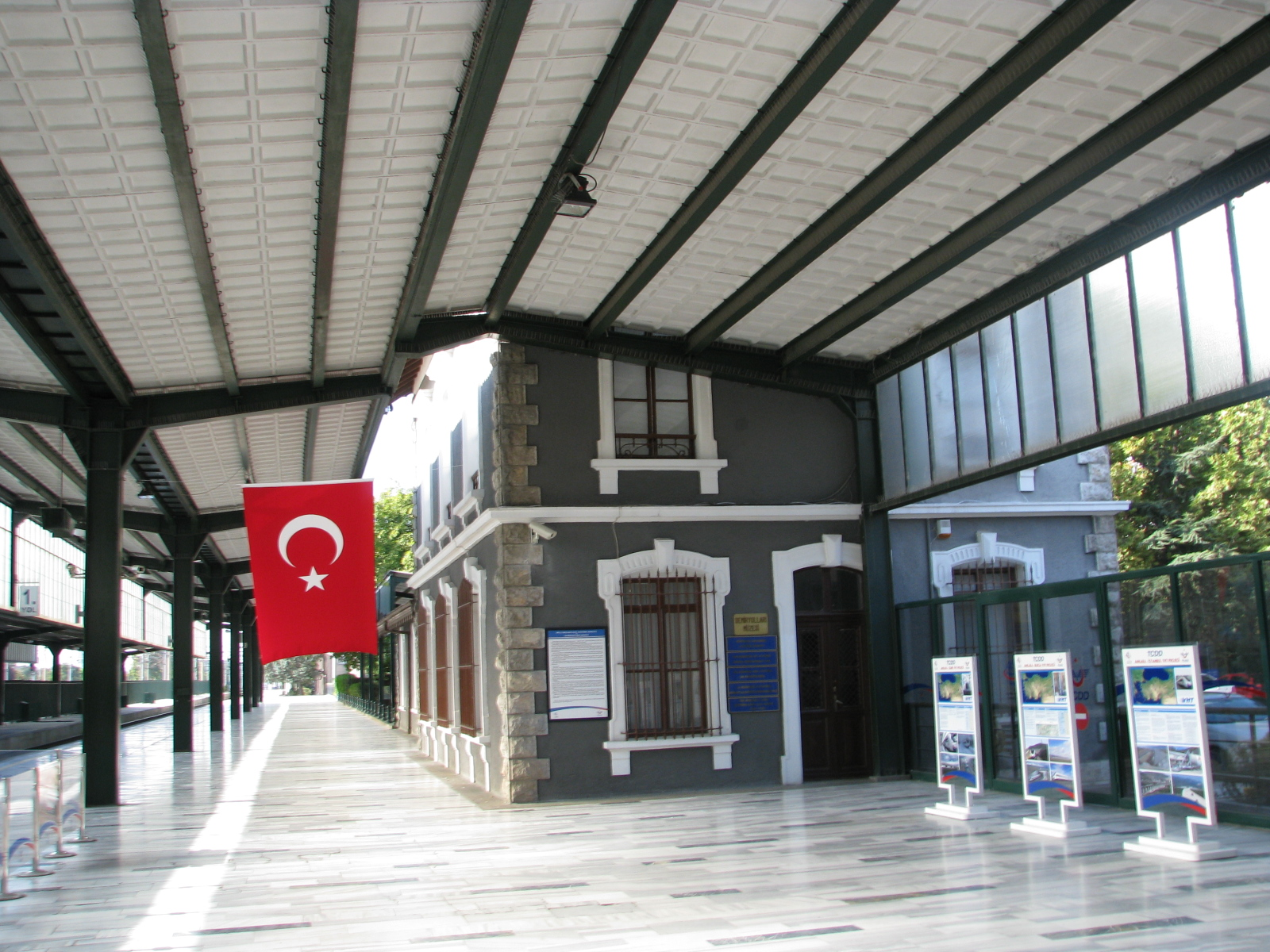
The residence of Atatürk during the National Campaign was located within Ankara Railway Station Campus

The land upon which the Çankaya Mansion now stands was a vineyard that belonged to Ohannes Kasabian, an Armenian jeweller and merchant. The vineyard and house were confiscated by the Bulgurluzâde family after the Kasabian family fled Ankara to escape the Armenian genocide and settled in Istanbul.

When Mustafa Kemal Atatürk, who would go to serve as the first president of Turkey, saw the building in 1921, he took a strong liking to the property and purchased it from Bulgurluzâde Tevfik Efendi for 4500 liras. When he initially arrived in Ankara in 1919, Atatürk settled in the Angora School of Agriculture. Following his election as speaker of the Grand National Assembly on 23 April 1920, he moved into a stone house at the railway station, which was once station master's lodge, known as the Direction House. On 30 May 1921, Atatürk settled in the vineyard lodge, which, after repairs, became known as the Çankaya Mansion.

== Museum Mansion ==
In 1924, architect Mehmet Vedat Bey undertook some renovations on the Kasabian Mansion, including adding a second floor for new bedrooms, a framed window entrance at the front, a pantry and kitchen at the rear, and a tower onto the side. In 1926, a central heating system was added. This Mansion became Mareşal Atatürk's home until he moved to the new Çankaya Mansion in June 1932. The building was then named "Army House" after Atatürk transferred it to the Turkish Army. The mansion has held a very important place in the history of the Republic. In 1950, after some renovations, it was opened as a museum for public access. In 1986, major restoration works were completed. Since then, a conservation programme has been implemented to preserve the mansion in its original form, with all its original fittings and furniture. The building lacks the opulence of a large palace and is unpretentious, yet styled and designed for practical use. It served as Commander-in-chief Atatürk's headquarters during the National Campaign and the years of westernizing transformations and reforms. Having witnessed to a number of defining moments at a time when the War of Independence was fought and the Republic was founded, today, it is carefully preserved as a tribute to Atatürk's memory.

== Çankaya Mansion ==
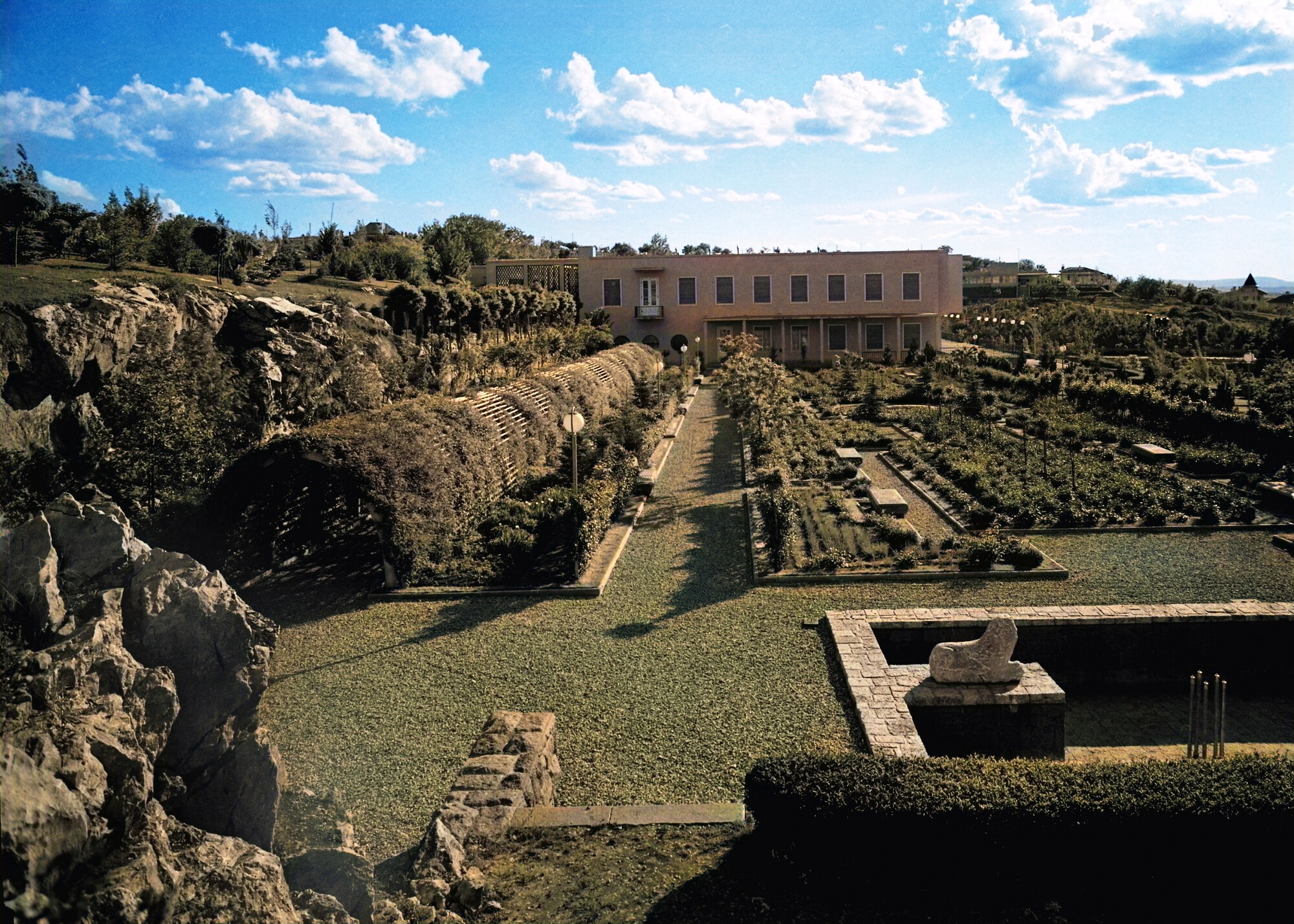
The Çankaya Mansion during World War II

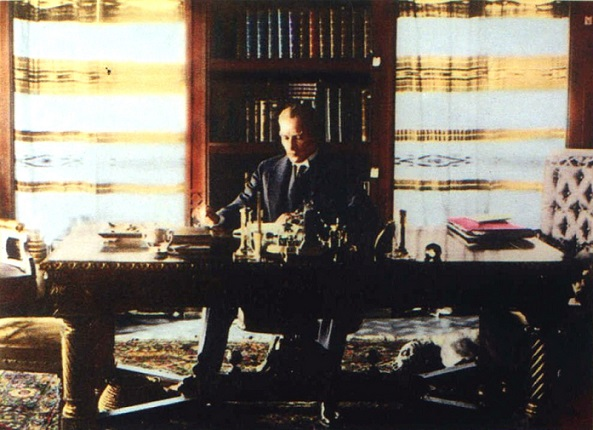
President Atatürk studying in the Library Room.

Despite the fact that expansion and renovation activities were made twice at the Museum Mansion, when it remained inadequate to meet the gradually increasing needs, it was decided in 1930 to have a new building constructed. Upon the request of Atatürk, the construction of the new Mansion was given to the famous Austrian architect Prof. Dr. Clemens Holzmeister. After Holzmeister assumed the duty on 20 May 1930, he prepared the first draft five days later and two days after he made the changes requested by Atatürk, he delivered the project draft and it is known that he presented the definite plan and model to Atatürk at Yalova on 27 July 1930. Atatürk, after deciding on the place of construction in November 1930, left the decisions related to the construction completely to Holzmeister. The Austrian architect brought all of the architectural structure material from Austria. A part of the interior spaces of the mansion were designed at the Academy of Fine Arts in Vienna. Holzmeister, who started the construction of the Çankaya Mansion at the beginning of 1931, completed it in a short period of time, such as 1.5 years, and delivered it in June 1932. The entrance story of the mansion, which is made as two stories above a basement, is the working area and place where guests are received. Whereas, the upper story was arranged as the residence. The Çankaya Mansion, which reflects the combination of the traditional Turkish house style with the ease of life of the West, besides being the residence and working areas of Atatürk from 1932 until his death, since it was designed by taking his requests and warnings into account, it is also of value and importance from the aspect of showing his taste and the lifestyle he envisaged. After Atatürk, the Çankaya Mansion gave services, both as a residence and as an office building to İsmet İnönü, Celal Bayar, Cemal Gürsel, Cevdet Sunay, Fahri Korutürk, Kenan Evren, Turgut Özal and Süleyman Demirel, who assumed the duty of President. The mansion, starting from the ninth president Süleyman Demirel, was only used as a residence with the completion of the new service buildings.

== Glass Mansion ==
The Glass Mansion is the third building within the Çankaya Campus. Atatürk had it constructed as the residence of his sister Makbule Atadan. The mansion, which was designed by architect Seyfi Arkan, is stated in the architectural records to be one of the luxurious Mansion examples of the period. The Glass Mansion, which is a single-story structure, was completed in 1936. It was allocated as the residence of foreign heads of state, who visited Turkey between 1951 and 1954. It was used as the residence of the Prime Ministry and the Senate Chairmanship between 1954 and 1970. The Glass Mansion, which changed considerably with the repairs made in various periods, was restored in 1994 and a 300 meters square bedroom unit was added and it started to be used again at the beginning of 1996 as a place where foreign heads of state could stay as guests.

== Aide-de-Camp building ==
There is no definite information related to the date of the Aide-de-Camp building. Despite the fact that it is stated in some records that it was built in 1922, in a book of memories related to 1924, there is no relationship between the building in the photograph stated to be the “Aide-de-Camp Building” and the building of the present day. The Aide-de-Camp building is a single story built of stone and has undergone many restorations and repairs and it is understood that some sections were added on later. In a stone paved courtyard at the back of the building, the date 1928 is written, but it is not known whether this was written during the construction of the building or during a restoration.

== Gate No. 1 ==
Gate No. 1, which is the main entrance gate of the Çankaya Campus is also called the Protocol Gate. As it can also be understood from its name, the protocol entrances are made from this gate. Gate No. 1, which became inadequate to meet the needs, together with the changing conditions, was reconstructed in 1999, also including landscaping. Besides the bronze gate, the wall coverings from andesite stone and the landscaping, there is a 230 meters square main gate building and a 140 meters square military unit building and was renovated in conformance with the general architecture and environmental structure of the Çankaya Campus.

== Administrative building ==
The Administrative building, for which Mustafa Aytöre and Orhan Genç were the project architects, is composed of two stories and a basement. One section is allocated for use to the Preservation Directorate and one section is allocated for use to the Administrative and Financial Affairs Chairmanship. It was built in 1985 on an area of 3,546 meters square.

== Service building ==
During the term of Kenan Evren, the seventh President, it was evaluated that due to the fact that the Çankaya Mansion was inadequate for use, both as a service building and as a residence, it was decided to have a new service building constructed. The building, for which the foundation was laid in 1983, was completed in seven years and started to be used on 29 October 1993. The project, which was prepared by architects Mustafa Aytöre and Orhan Genç, is used as a workplace of the units of the Presidency and the New Service Building has meeting and reception rooms and the official office and study of the President.

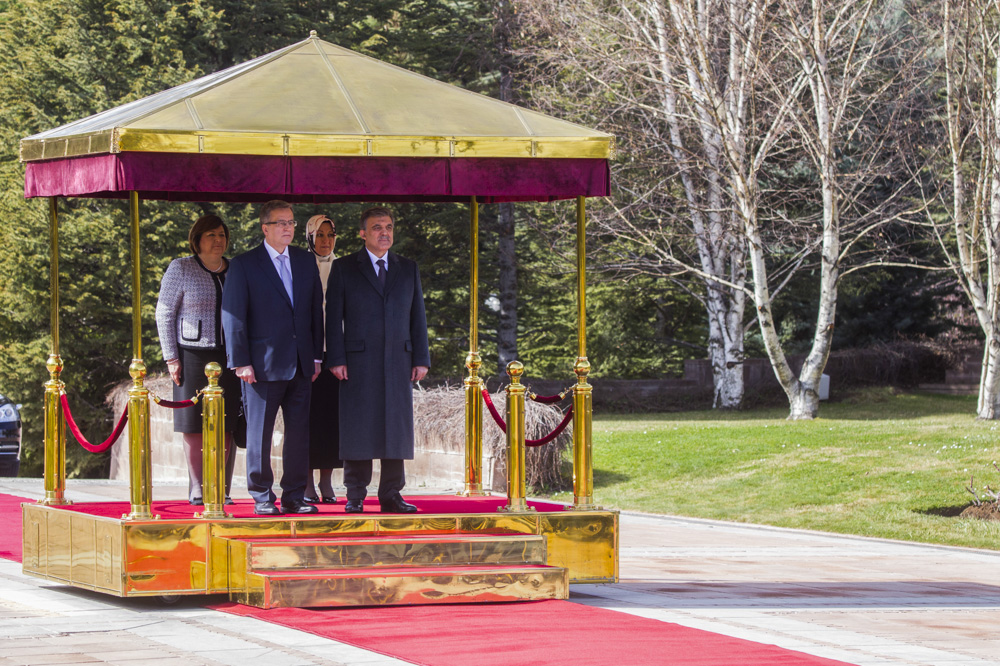
Tören Path

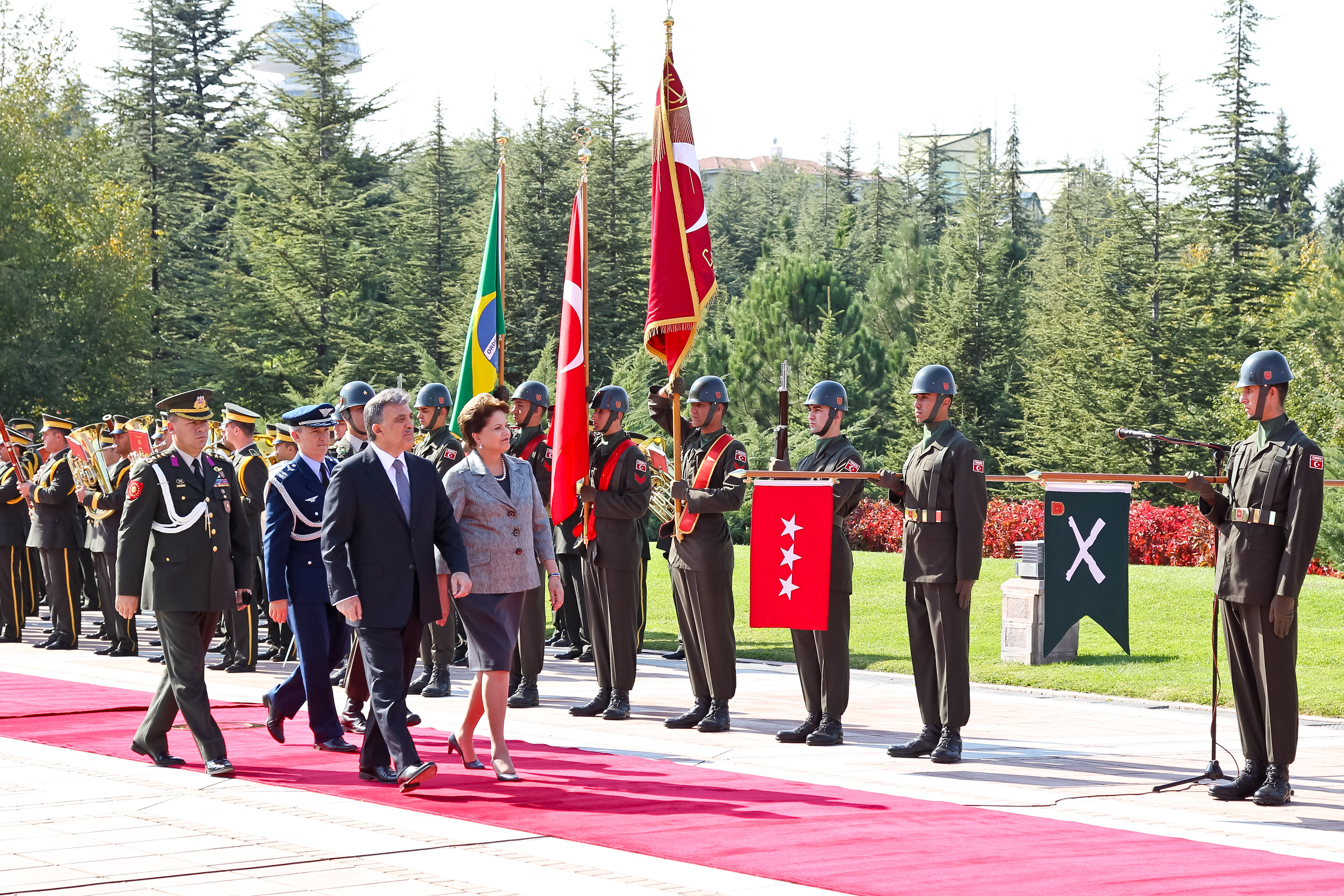
Tören Path

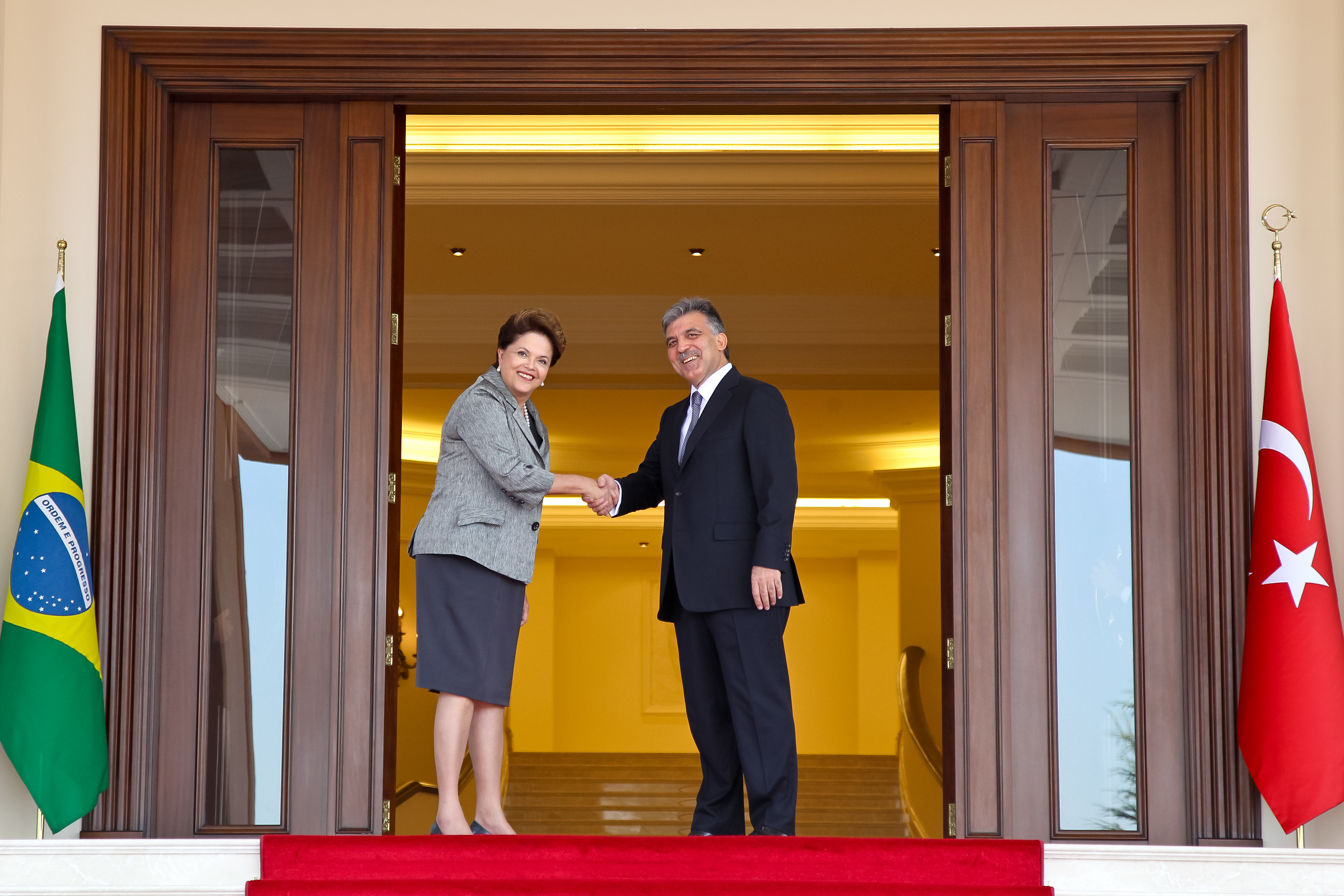
Front Entrance

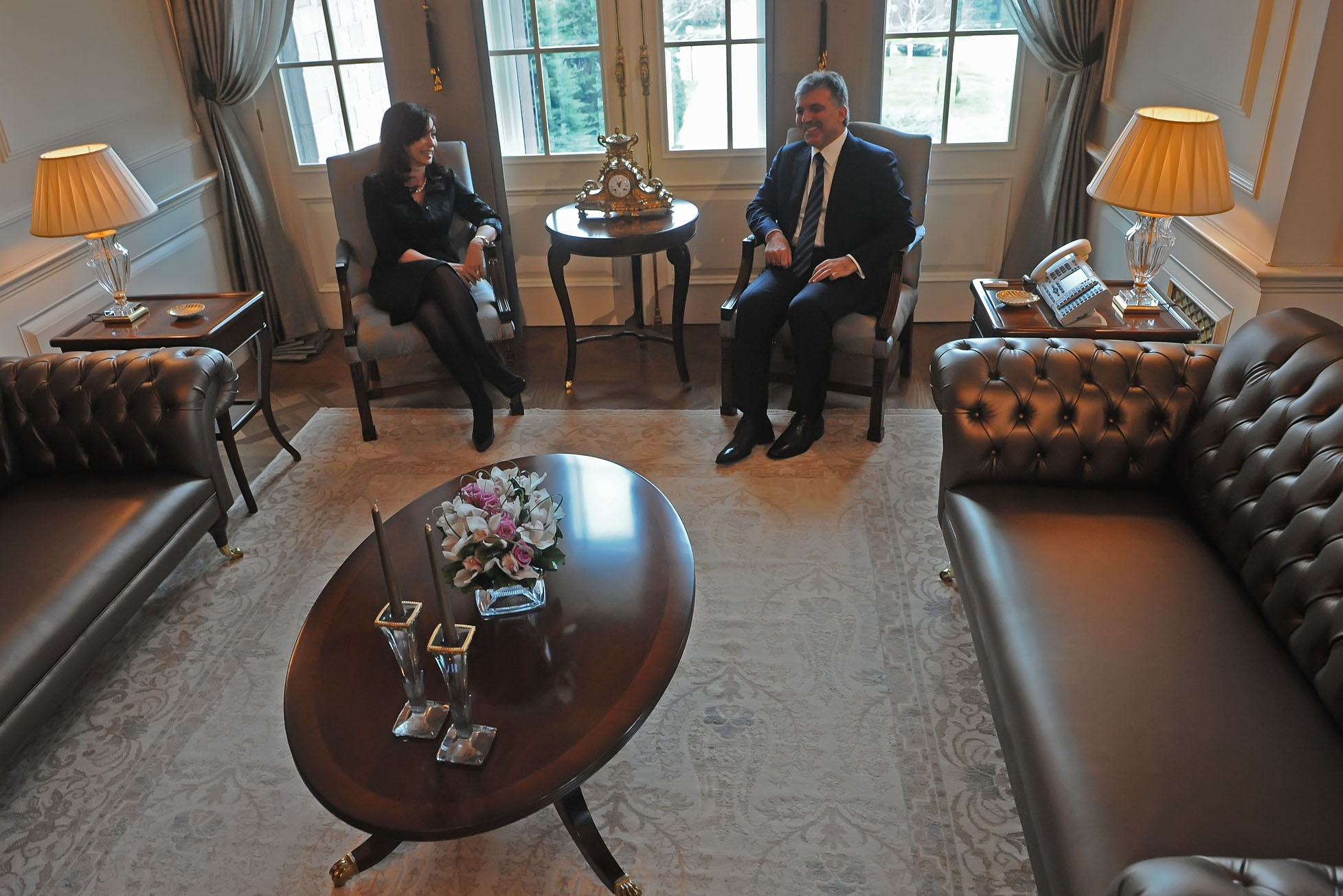
Welcoming Room

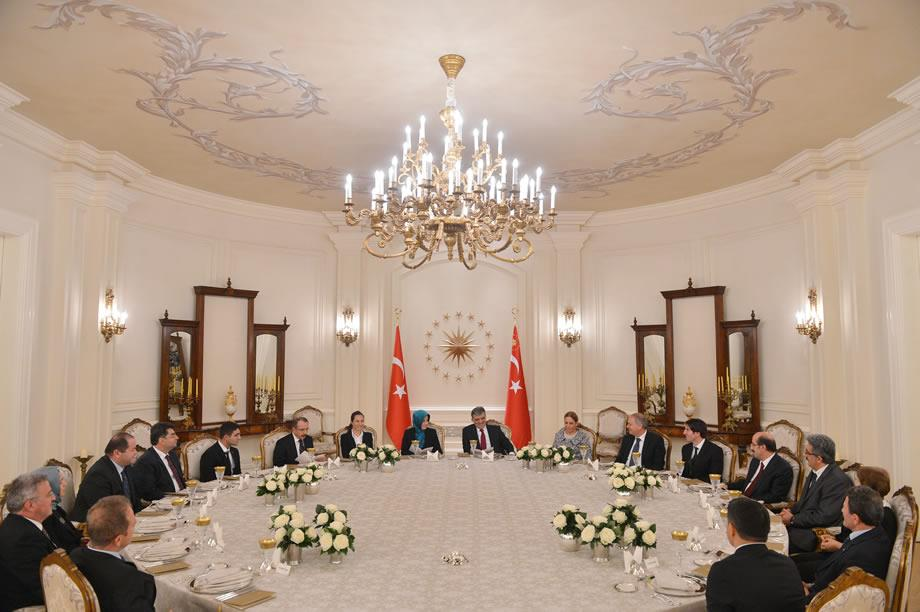
Dining Room

== Social facilities and health centre ==
The social facilities are composed of a shooting polygon, a sports hall and cafeteria and has a construction area of approximately 2,000 meters square. The construction of the facility, which is composed of three stories, started on 19 June 1995 and was completed on 20 December 1996. The shooting polygon was organized with the objective of training the bodyguard personnel of the Presidency and the sports hall and cafeteria were organized to give services to all of the personnel. The health centre, with the repairs and additions made in 1996 and 1999, was transformed into a contemporary health centre that can provide services with a dentist, family physician, pediatrician, a sufficient number of nurses and a laboratory for the personnel on duty at the Presidential General Secretariat.

== Other facilities ==
=== Press conference and reception halls ===
Due to the fact that the reception hall at the New Service Building was inadequate and that there was no press conference hall in the aforementioned building, a project was implemented on 21 May 1997 that would meet this need. A reception hall and foyer, which has different functions, has an area of 2,650 meters square together with additions and a press conference hall, which has a total area of 1,250 meters square together with the other sections, were constructed. The reception hall was opened for use on 29 October 1998 and the press conference hall was opened on 29 October 1999. The Press Conference Hall, which was designed by being connected to the New Service Building, was built underground in order not to spoil the structure of the tree grove within the Campus.

=== General Secretariat and State Supervisory Board ===
The old service building within the Çankaya Campus was torn down and in its place, a new building was constructed, which was designed by taking into consideration the needs of the New General Secretariat and the State Supervisory Board, which are composed of six blocks connected to each other.

=== Greenhouse, Parks and Gardens Directorate ===
When the old greenhouse became inadequate, a new and contemporary greenhouse project was prepared and the construction started in 1998. The greenhouse and the Parks and Gardens Directorate building, which is composed of two stories on a total area of 1,590 meters square, was completed in 1999 and started services.

== Presidents at the mansion ==
Many events have transpired at the Çankaya Mansion which makes it one of the most significant places in Turkish history. All presidents have resided at the Çankaya Mansion and have laid their own mark with their actions and commissioned renovations. Some presidents have chosen to look after the home with their own wages while others have chosen to expand the Campus at great cost. Even during coups the Çankaya Mansion played its part with generals Evren and Gürsel becoming president and Celal Bayar holding a pistol at coupists in an attempt to save himself.

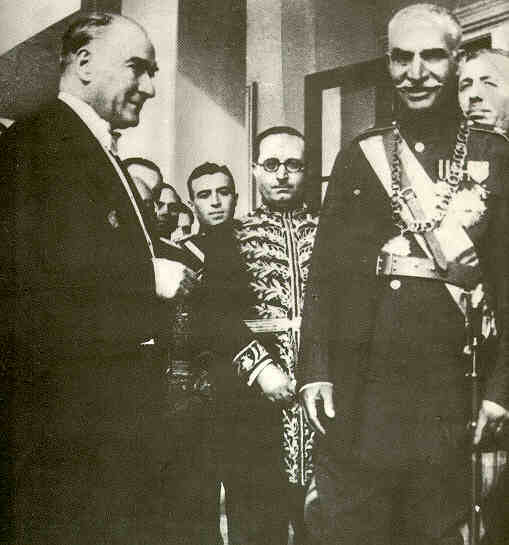
President Atatürk meets the Shāh of Iran

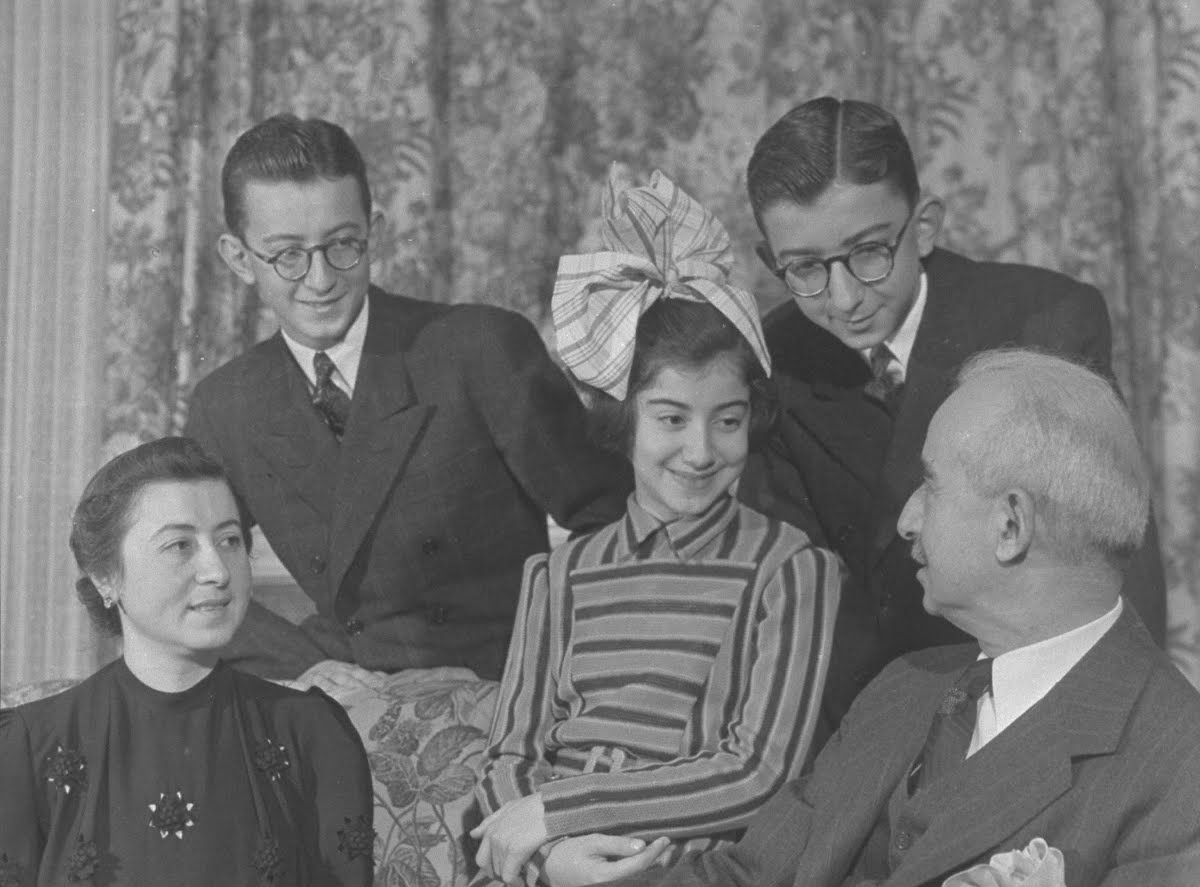
President İnönü and his family.

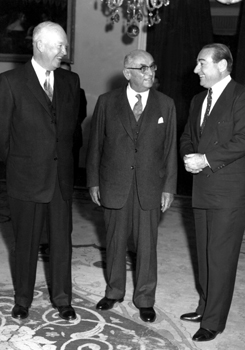
President Bayar with allies.

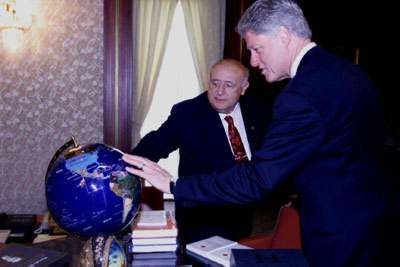
President Demirel meets with the President of America

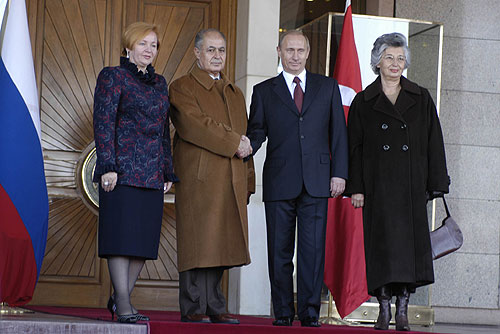
President Sezer meets with the President of Russia

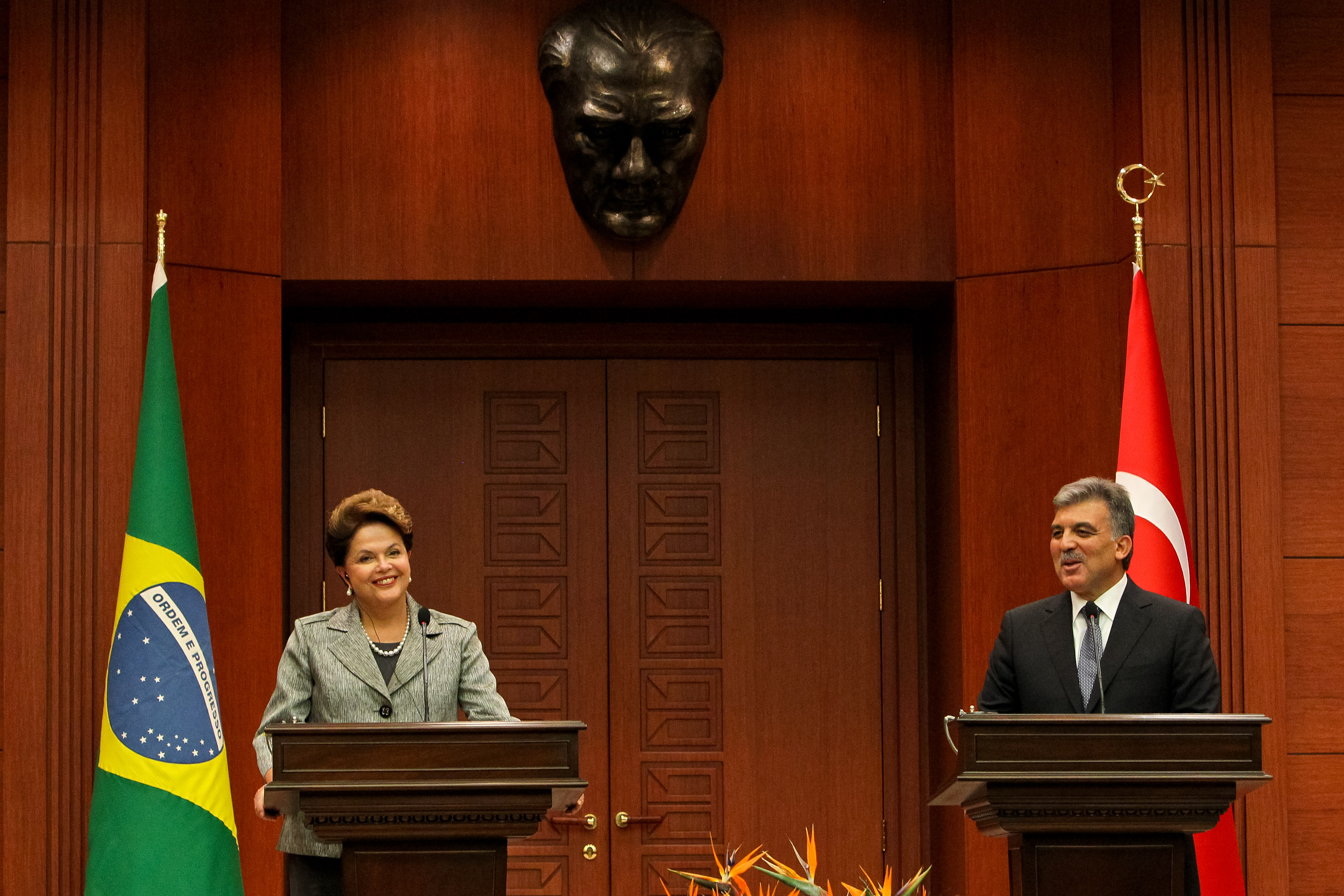
President Gül meets with the President of Brazil

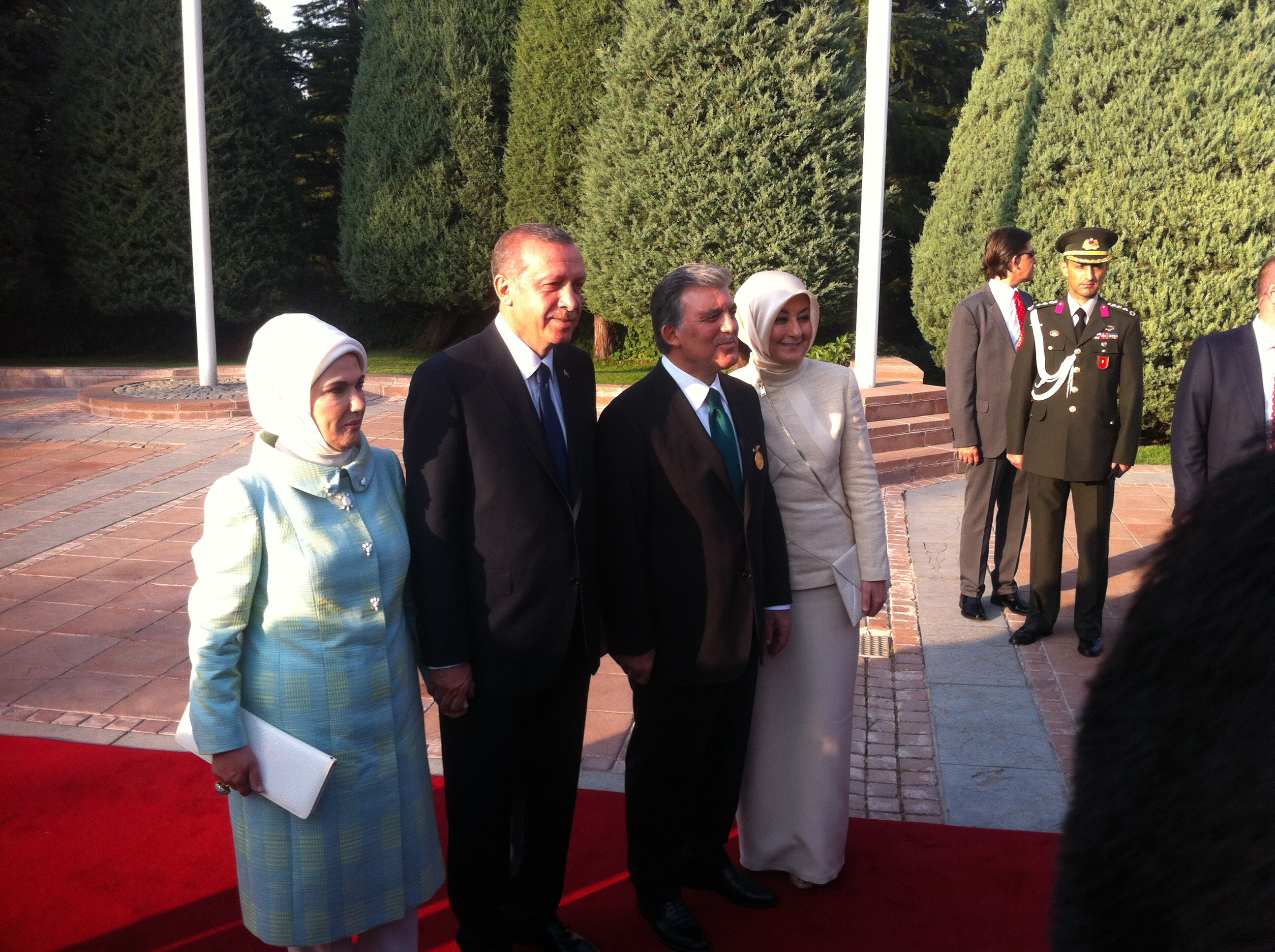
President Erdoğan succeeding President Gül

== Sources ==
- Üngör, Uğur Ümit; Polatel, Mehmet (2011). Confiscation and destruction: The Young Turk Seizure of Armenian Property. New York: e Continuum International Publishing Group. ISBN 978-1-4411-3578-0. ISSN 1538-0661. OCLC 741492909. OL 25563097M.
