= Cabinet of Turkey =

Executive body of the Republic of Turkey

The Cabinet of Turkey (Turkish: Türkiye Kabinesi) or Presidential Cabinet (Turkish: Cumhurbaşkanlığı Kabinesi) is the body that advises the President of Turkey on executive affairs. It is composed of the President, Vice President and the heads of the ministries. After the Council of Ministers was abolished with 2017 constitutional referendum, the Cabinet now acts as an informal advisory forum as all its powers and functions were vested to the President.

According to the Turkish constitution, ministers cannot be a member of parliament due to separation of powers.

== Process of nomination and appointment ==
The President of Turkey is elected by the people every five years. The president then appoints and dismiss the deputies of the president as well as the ministers according to article 104 of the Constitution. The deputies of the president and the ministers are required to take oath before the Parliament.

After the transition to a presidential system in 2017, the cabinet does not require a parliamentary approval anymore to be formed.

== Separation of powers ==
Cabinet members and other members of the executive power cannot occupy any position in the Parliament. Cabinet ministers, and other executive branch appointees, must resign their seat in Parliament to serve in the government. These restrictions are in place to alleviate external pressure and influence on ministers, and to enable them to focus on their governmental work.

The Parliament has no role in confirming presidential appointments for the cabinet. However, a majority vote in the Parliament can overturn a presidential decree. It can also table a motion requesting that the ministers to be investigated on allegations of perpetration of a crime regarding their duties. The Parliament also can dismiss the President (and thus the whole cabinet) by calling for early presidential elections. In order to achieve this, a three-fifth majority in the Parliament is required. In this case, both the presidential election as well as the parliamentary election shall be renewed.

== Functioning ==
The president is the chief executive leader. Therefore, the whole cabinet's tenure is linked to the president's tenure: The president's (and the cabinet's) term automatically ends, if a newly elected president sits for the first time, or if the president resigns or dies.

The President is responsible for guiding the cabinet and deciding its political direction. According to the principle of departmentalization, the cabinet ministers are free to carry out their duties independently within the boundaries set by the President's political directives. The Parliament may at any time ask the President to dismiss a minister or to appoint a new minister. The President also decides the scope of each minister's duties and can nominate ministers to lead a department and so called ministers for special affairs without an own department. The president can also lead a department himself.

The president's freedom to shape its cabinet is only limited by some constitutional provisions: The president has to appoint a Minister of Defence, a Minister of Internal Affairs, Minister of Foreign Affairs and a Minister of Justice and is implicitly forbidden from also heading one of these departments, as the constitution invests these ministers with some special powers. For example, the Minister of Justice is also the President of the Council of Judges and Prosecutors. If two ministers disagree on a particular point, the cabinet resolves the conflict by a majority vote or the President exercises final decision authority. This often depends on the President's governing style.

The President may appoint one or more deputies after being elected, who may deputise for the President in their absence. If the President dies or is unwilling or unable to act as President, the Deputy President shall act as and exercise the powers of the President until the next President of the Republic is elected.

According to established practice, decisions on important security issues are made by the National Security Council, a government agency chaired by the President. Pursuant to its (classified) rules of procedure, its sessions are confidential.

=== Meetings of the cabinet ===
The cabinet regularly meets bi-weekly every Monday afternoon. Depending on how busy the schedule is, it is sometimes held on Tuesdays as well. After the meetings, a press conference is held by the head of government or a government spokesperson. The meetings, from which minutes will be drawn up, may be deliberative and/or decision-making. The minutes will include, exclusively, the circumstances related to the time and place of its celebration, the list of attendees, the resolutions adopted and the reports presented. Therefore, the deliberations that the different members of the Government maintain, since these by law are of a secret nature, can not be collected.

The meetings of the cabinet are convened and chaired by the President though, in his absence, Deputy President take the responsibility to chair over the cabinet. Before the transition to the presidential system in 2017, the meetings were chaired by the Prime Minister. Occasionally, the cabinet was also chaired by the President who then attended the meetings solely on a consultative basis.

=== Location of cabinet meetings ===
The cabinet meetings are held at the Presidential Complex, the official resident of the President and the headquarters of the government. Previously, the meetings were also held in the Çankaya Mansion and the prime minister's office.

== Composition ==
Office	Image	Minister	Party	Took office	Left office
President of Turkey; Cumhurbaşkanı		Recep Tayyip Erdoğan (born 1954)	Justice and Development	3 June 2023	Incumbent
Vice President of Turkey; Cumhurbaşkanı Yardımcısı		Cevdet Yılmaz (born 1967)	Justice and Development	4 June 2023	Incumbent
Ministry of Justice; Adalet Bakanlığı		Yılmaz Tunç (born 1971)	Justice and Development	4 June 2023	Incumbent
Ministry of Family and Social Services; Aile ve Sosyal Hizmetler Bakanlığı		Mahinur Özdemir (born 1982)	Independent	4 June 2023	Incumbent
Ministry of Labour and Social Security; Çalışma ve Sosyal Güvenlik Bakanlığı		Vedat Işıkhan (born 1966)	Justice and Development	4 June 2023	Incumbent
Ministry of Environment, Urbanisation and Climate Change; Çevre, Şehircilik ve İklim Değişikliği Bakanlığı		Murat Kurum (born 1976)	Justice and Development	2 July 2024	Incumbent
Ministry of Foreign Affairs; Dışişleri Bakanlığı		Hakan Fidan (born 1968)	Justice and Development	4 June 2023	Incumbent
Ministry of Energy and Natural Resources; Enerji ve Tabii Kaynaklar Bakanlığı		Alparslan Bayraktar (born 1975)	Independent	4 June 2023	Incumbent
Ministry of Youth and Sports; Gençlik ve Spor Bakanlığı		Osman Aşkın Bak (born 1966)	Justice and Development	4 June 2023	Incumbent
Ministry of Treasury and Finance; Hazine ve Maliye Bakanlığı		Mehmet Şimşek (born 1967)	Justice and Development	4 June 2023	Incumbent
Ministry of the Interior; İçişleri Bakanlığı		Ali Yerlikaya (born 1968)	Independent	4 June 2023	Incumbent
Ministry of Culture and Tourism; Kültür ve Turizm Bakanlığı		Mehmet Ersoy (born 1968)	Independent	4 June 2023	Incumbent
Ministry of National Education; Millî Eğitim Bakanlığı		Yusuf Tekin (born 1970)	Independent	4 June 2023	Incumbent
Ministry of National Defense; Millî Savunma Bakanlığı		Yaşar Güler (born 1954)	Independent	4 June 2023	Incumbent
Ministry of Health; Sağlık Bakanlığı		Kemal Memişoğlu (born 1966)	Independent	4 June 2023	Incumbent
Ministry of Industry and Technology; Sanayi ve Teknoloji Bakanlığı		Mehmet Fatih Kacır (born 1984)	Independent	4 June 2023	Incumbent
Ministry of Agriculture and Forestry; Tarım ve Orman Bakanlığı		İbrahim Yumaklı (born 1969)	Independent	4 June 2023	Incumbent
Ministry of Trade; Ticaret Bakanlığı		Ömer Bolat (born 1963)	Justice and Development	4 June 2023	Incumbent
Ministry of Transport and Infrastructure; Ulaştırma ve Altyapı Bakanlığı		Abdulkadir Uraloğlu (born 1966)	Independent	4 June 2023	Incumbent

== See also ==
- List of cabinets of Turkey
- Government of Turkey
