= State Supervisory Council =

State Inspection Council (Turkish: Devlet Denetleme Kurulu) was founded based on the 1982 constitution as a central assisting body. The main function of the council is to audit governance in terms of compliance with legal regulations, in coordination with high efficiency. The council is under direct authority of the President of the Republic of Turkey.

The council handles inspections based on request of the President, it is an authority on all public bodies including professional institutions, employees and the employers' associations, and non-profit chambers. This excludes the Turkish Army and juridical bodies.
