= President of Turkey =

Head of state and government

President of the Republic of Türkiye
- Türkiye Cumhuriyeti; Cumhurbaşkanı
- Presidential emblem

- Presidential standard

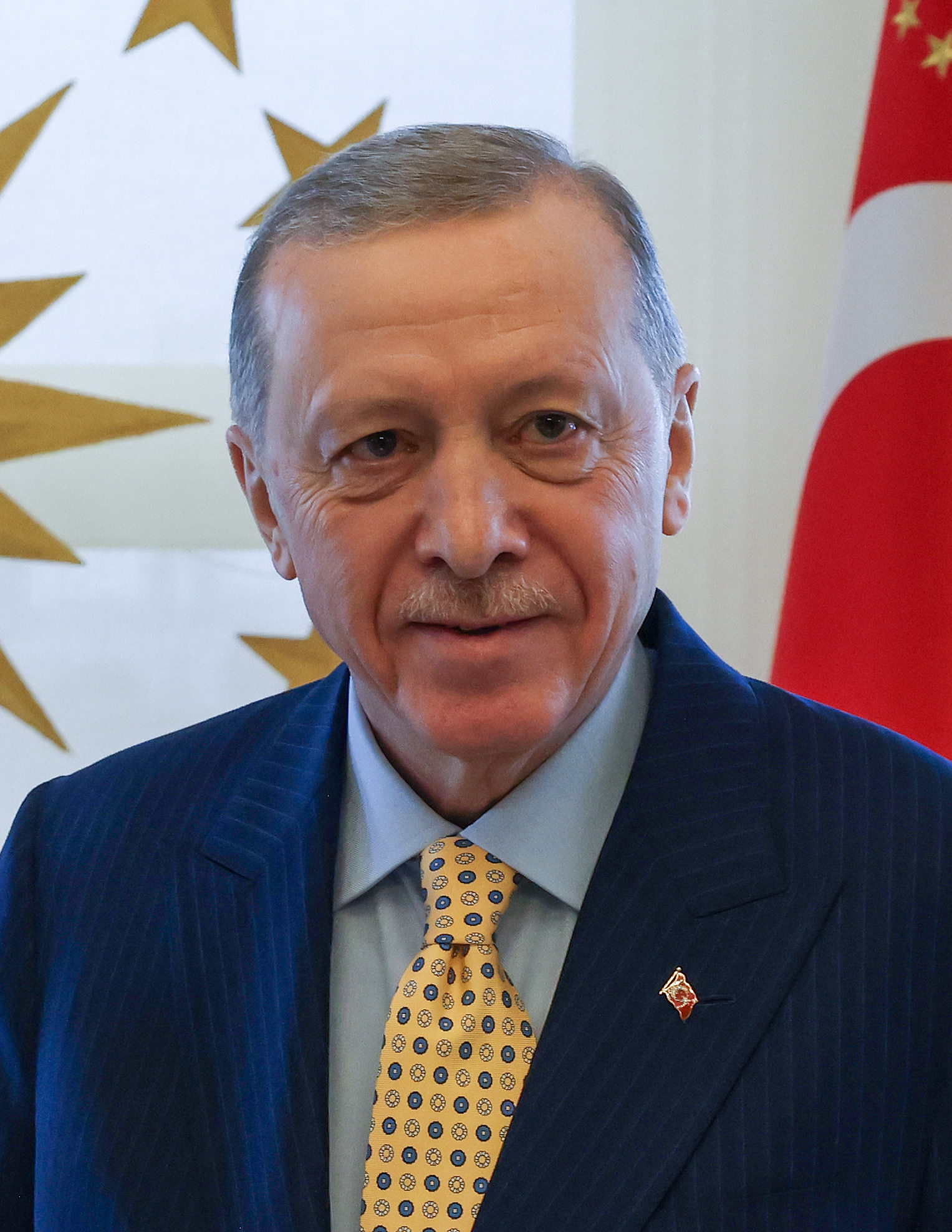
- Incumbent; Recep Tayyip Erdoğan since 28 August 2014
- Executive branch of the Turkish government
- Style: Mr. President (informal); The Honorable (formal); His Excellency (formal, diplomatic)
- Status: Head of state Head of government Commander-in-chief
- Member of: Cabinet; National Security Council; Supreme Military Council
- Residence: Presidential Complex
- Appointer: Direct popular vote
- Term length: Five years, renewable once
- Constituting instrument: Constitution of Turkey (1982)
- Precursor: Sultan of the Ottoman Empire (as Head of State); Prime Minister of Turkey (as Head of Government)
- Inaugural holder: Mustafa Kemal Atatürk
- Formation: 29 October 1923; 102 years ago
- Deputy: Vice President
- Salary: ₺1,428,000/US$ 75,435 (2023)
- Website: www.tccb.tr

The president of Turkey, officially the president of the Republic of Türkiye (Turkish: Türkiye Cumhuriyeti Cumhurbaşkanı), is the head of state and head of government of Turkey. The president directs the executive branch of the national government and is the commander-in-chief of the Turkish military. The president also heads the National Security Council.

The office of the president of Turkey was established with the proclamation of the Republic of Türkiye on 29 October 1923, with the first president and founder being Mustafa Kemal Atatürk. Traditionally, the presidency was mostly a ceremonial position, with real executive authority being exercised by the prime minister of Turkey. However, constitutional amendments approved in the 2017 constitutional referendum abolished the office of prime minister, and vested the presidency with full executive powers, effective upon the 2018 general election. The president is directly elected by eligible Turkish voters for a five-year term.

The president of Turkey is referred to as Cumhurbaşkanı ("Republic leader"), and previously archaically as Cumhurreisi or Reis-i Cumhur, also meaning "head of the republic/people".

Recep Tayyip Erdoğan is the 12th and current president of Turkey, who has held the office since 28 August 2014.

== History ==
The office of the president was established with the proclamation of the republic on 29 October 1923. In the voting held on the same day, Mustafa Kemal Atatürk was unanimously elected as the first president. From this date until 2014, all presidents except Kenan Evren were elected by the Turkish Grand National Assembly.

Among the former presidents, Mustafa Kemal Atatürk, İsmet İnönü and Celâl Bayar served as presidents affiliated with a political party. Atatürk and İnönü continued to serve as both the chairman and the president of the Republican People's Party, while Celâl Bayar resigned from the Democrat Party chairmanship when he started his presidency, but continued to be a party member during his presidency.

With the 1961 Constitution made after the 1960 coup, it was decided that presidents should cut off any relation with political parties. Evren, who was governing the country as the head of state and the head of the National Security Council after the 1980 coup, was appointed to the Presidency on 7 November 1982, when the constitution was adopted by popular vote, in accordance with the first provisional article of the 1982 Constitution.

With the 2007 constitutional amendment referendum, it was decided that the president would be elected by the people, and in the first elections held on 10 August 2014 after this change, Recep Tayyip Erdoğan was elected president by the people. The president, who is the head of state, is also the head of government after the 2017 constitutional amendment referendum.

== Leadership roles ==
=== Head of state ===
As head of state, the president represents the Turkish government to its own people, and represents the nation to the rest of the world. Insulting the head of state is prohibited by Article 299 of the Turkish Penal Code.

=== Head of party ===
Leaders of political parties are generally expected to run as a presidential candidate for their party. However, they can also decide not to run as a candidate and contribute to the process of nominating other individuals.

From 1961 until 2017, Turkish presidents were required to sever all relations, if any, with their political party. This convention existed to ensure the president's impartiality in presiding over the Turkish constitutional system. However, the presidency's reorientation in 2017 into a chief executive office abolished this convention, given a president's assumption of office as winners of a partisan electoral contest.

=== Regional leader ===
The presidents of Turkey are widely perceived as regional power due to the country's strategic importance, geopolitical influence, economic and military strength, cultural heritage, and historical ties. Their active engagement in regional diplomacy, mediation efforts, humanitarian assistance, and economic cooperation underscores Turkey's role as a key player in shaping regional dynamics and promoting stability and prosperity in the broader neighborhood.

== Selection process ==
=== Eligibility ===
Article 101, Section 1 of the Constitution sets three qualifications for holding the presidency. To serve as president, one must:

- be a Turkish citizen who is eligible to be a deputy;
- be at least 40 years old;
- have completed higher education.

If a presidential candidate is a member of the Turkish Grand National Assembly, they must resign their seat due to separation of powers.

=== Election ===
The principles regarding the election of the President are regulated in Article 101 of the Constitution and in the Presidential Election Law.

In the election to be held by universal suffrage, the candidate who receives the absolute majority of the valid votes is elected president. If this majority is not achieved in the first round, a runoff is held on the second Sunday following this vote. The two candidates who received the most votes in the first ballot participate in this voting and the candidate who receives the majority of the valid votes is elected president.

If one of the presidential candidates who gains the right to run for the second round is unable to participate in the election for any reason, the second round shall be conducted by substituting the vacant candidacy in conformity with the ranking in the first round. If only one candidate remains for the second round, this ballot shall be then conducted as a referendum. A presidential candidate receives the majority of the valid votes shall be elected as president. If that candidate fails to receive the majority of the valid votes in the election, the presidential election will be scheduled to be renewed.

Before the constitutional amendments approved in the 2007 referendum, the Grand National Assembly would elect one of its members as the President.

=== Inauguration ===
Before executing the powers of the office, a president is required to recite the presidential Oath of Office, found in Article 103, Section 1 of the Constitution. This is the only component in the inauguration ceremony mandated by the Constitution:

In my capacity as President of the Republic, I swear upon my honour and integrity before the Great Turkish Nation and before history to safeguard the existence and independence of the state, the indivisible integrity of the country and the nation, and the absolute sovereignty of the nation, to abide by the Constitution, the rule of law, democracy, the principles and reforms of Atatürk, and the principles of the secular republic, not to deviate from the ideal according to which everyone is entitled to enjoy human rights and fundamental freedoms under conditions of national peace and prosperity and in a spirit of national solidarity and justice, and do my utmost to preserve and exalt the glory and honour of the Republic of Turkey and perform without bias the functions that I have assumed.

The inauguration happens in the Grand National Assembly. The oath is broadcast live on TBMM-TV regardless of it is a regular business day of the Grand National Assembly.

== Incumbency ==
The seal of the presidency

=== Term limit ===
The president is elected for a term of office of five years and is eligible for one re-election. An exception exists when a president's term ends with a parliamentary decision (i.e., impeachment and removal from office). In this case, the president may be re-elected for an additional term, with the incomplete term not counting against the two-term limit.

The term of the incumbent president continues until the president-elect takes office. Before 1961, there were no term limits for presidency. Until the constitutional amendment approved in the 2007 referendum, the president used to be elected for a single seven-year term.

=== Vacancies and successions ===
In the event that the office of the president becomes vacant for any reason and there is one year or less before the general election of the Turkish Grand National Assembly, the election of the president is held together with the general election of the Grand National Assembly of Turkey on the first Sunday following the sixtieth day after the vacancy of the office.

In the event that the office of the president becomes vacant for any reason and there is more than one year remaining for the general election of the Turkish Grand National Assembly, the presidential election is held on the last Sunday within forty-five days following the day the office is vacant. The president elected in this way continues his duty until the election date of the Turkish Grand National Assembly. For the president who has completed the remaining term, this period is not counted as a term.

If the elections are not completed, the current president's office continues until the new one takes office.

In the event that the Turkish Grand National Assembly decides that it is not possible to hold new elections due to the war, the presidential election is postponed for one year. If the reason for the postponement has not disappeared, this process can be repeated according to the procedure in the postponement decision.

=== Accountability and non-accountability ===
==== After the 2017 constitutional amendment ====
2017 constitutional referendum extended the president's accountability beyond impeachment due to high treason. According to the constitutional amendments approved in the referendum, the Grand National Assembly may initiate an investigation of the president, the vice president or any member of the Cabinet upon the proposal of simple majority of its total members, and within a period less than a month, the approval of three-fifths of the total members. The investigation would be carried out by a commission of fifteen members of the Assembly, each nominated by the political parties in proportion to their representation therein. The commission would submit its report indicating the outcome of the investigation to the speaker within two months. If the investigation is not completed within this period, the commission's time renewed for another month. Within ten days of its submission to the speaker, the report would be distributed to all members of the Assembly, and ten days after its distribution, the report would be discussed on the floor. Upon the approval of two-thirds of the total number of the Assembly by secret vote, the person or persons, about whom the investigation was conducted, may be tried before the Constitutional Court. The trial would be finalized within three months, and if not, a one-time additional period of three months shall be granted.

A president about whom an investigation has been initiated may not call for an election. A president who is convicted by the Court would be removed from office.

The provision of this article shall also apply to the offenses for which the president allegedly worked during his term of office.

==== Before the 2017 constitutional amendment ====
Before the 2017 constitutional referendum, the president was not accountable for its actions and orders, except for impeachment due to high treason. All presidential decrees, except those which the president is empowered to enact on his own, had to be signed by the prime minister and the minister concerned, in accordance with the provisions of the constitution and other laws. Thus, the prime minister and the concerned ministers were accountable for these decrees, not the president. The decisions and orders signed by the president on his own initiatives may not be appealed to any judicial authority, including the Constitutional Court. The only accountability the president had was impeachment for high treason on the proposal of at least one-third of the total number of the members of the parliament and by the decision of at least three-fourths of the total number of the members.

=== The presidential appointments ===
After the 2017 constitutional referendum, the presidency gained absolute power over cabinet, and appointments of judiciary. Erdoğan appointed the following figures: the vice president, ministers, Chief of General Staff, commanders of the land, sea and air forces, Gendarmerie General, Commander and Coast Guard Commander, Chairman of the State, Supervisory Board, Chief Public Prosecutor of the Supreme Court of Appeals, governors and district governors, president of the Central Bank of the Republic of Turkey, and university rectors.

This has raised concerns over Turkey's judiciary and overall independence, especially after 2017 constitutional referendum this has gotten stronger as most judges and organs are now appointed by the president.

=== Residence ===
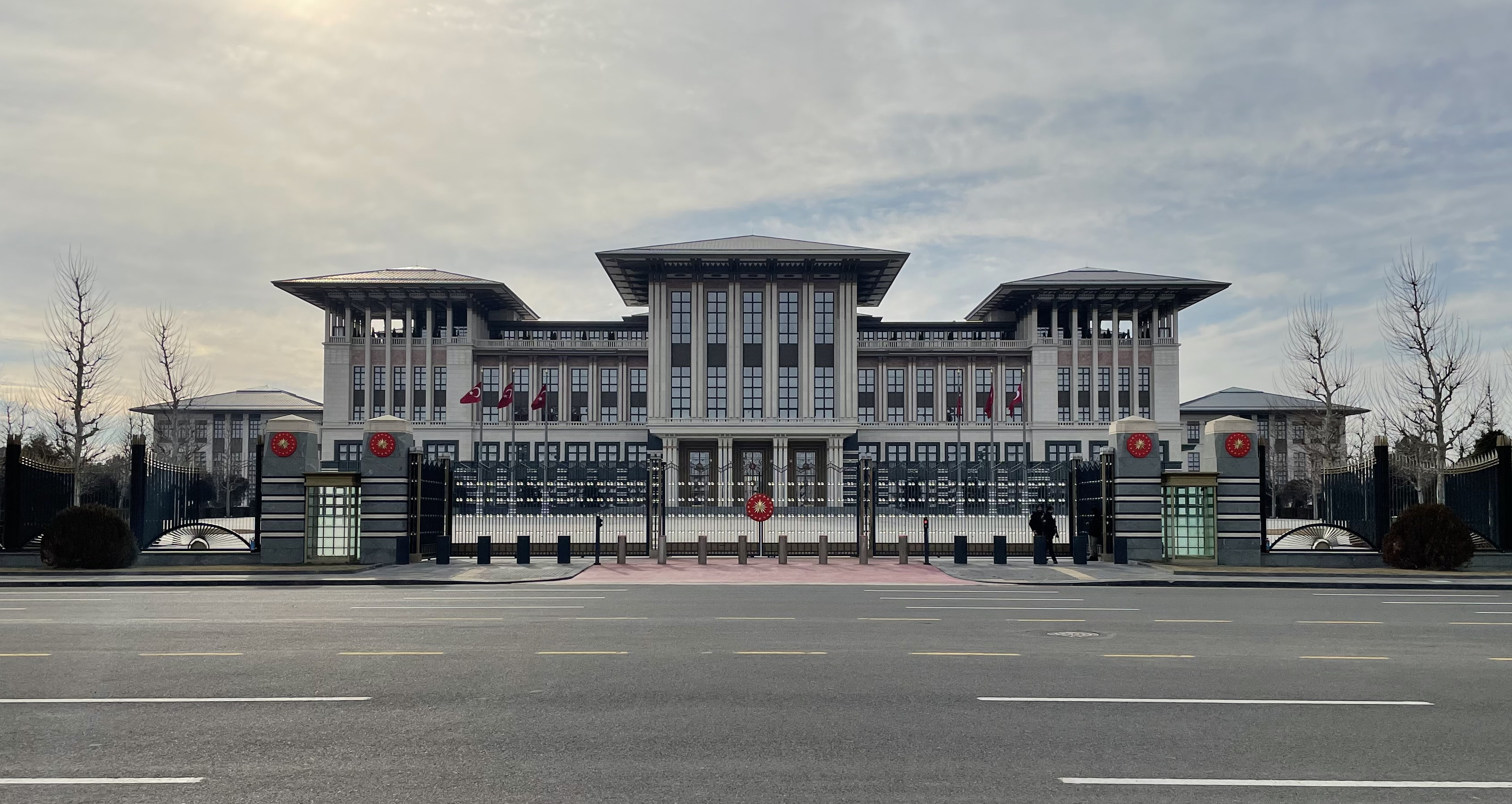
Presidential Palace is located in Ankara

The Presidential Complex in Ankara is the official residence of the president. It was formally inaugurated as the official residence of the president by Erdoğan on the country's Republic Day, 29 October 2014. From 1923 to 2014, the Çankaya Mansion served as the residence of the presidents. The Presidential State Guesthouse serves as the president's official guest house and as a secondary residence for the president if needed. The Huber Mansion, the Florya Atatürk Marine Mansion and the Vahdettin Pavilion have been used as presidential workplace or as summer residence.

== Duties and responsibilities ==
The president's duties are stated in the Articles 104 of the Constitution.

- The president shall deliver the opening address of the Grand National Assembly on the first day of the legislative year,
- The president may summon the Grand National Assembly to meet, when deemed necessary,
- The president may promulgate laws or return laws to the Grand National Assembly to be reconsidered (i.e. veto),
- The president shall appeal to the Constitutional Court for the annulment of laws or certain provisions thereof, and the Rules of Procedure of the parliament on the grounds that they are unconstitutional in form or in content,
- The president shall appoint and dismiss the Vice President of Turkey and public ministers,
- The president serves as Commander-in-Chief of the Turkish Armed Forces, on behalf of the Grand National Assembly, and defend Turkey's sovereignty and territorial integrity,
- The president shall appoint high-ranking officers of the Turkish Armed Forces, including the Chief of the Turkish General Staff, and regulate the procedure and principles governing the appointment thereof by executive order,
- The president shall appoint ambassadors of Turkey to foreign states, and to receive foreign ambassadors appointed to Turkey,
- The president may negotiate, conclude, ratify and promulgate international treaties,
- The president may submit legislation regarding amendment of the Constitution of Turkey to a referendum,
- The president may commute or pardon criminal sentences imposed on persons, on grounds of chronic illness, disability, or old age,
- The president may call new elections to the Grand National Assembly (by ordering its dissolution) and the presidency, thereby relinquishing the term currently being served,
- The president shall deliver a budget proposal to the Grand National Assembly for approval,
- The president shall call and preside over the National Security Council of Turkey,
- The president may proclaim the state of emergency, subject to the approval of the Grand National Assembly (in a state of emergency, the presidential decree requires parliamentary approval),
- The president may sign executive orders, which may not regulate fundamental rights included in Constitution and matters which the Constitution stipulates to be regulated exclusively by statute, or matters explicitly regulated by statute, (The statute prevails in the case of it conflicts with an executive order and the executive order becomes null and void if the parliament enacts a law on the same matter.)
- The president appoints the members and the chairman of, and instruct the State Supervisory Council, to carry out inquiries, investigations, and inspections,
- The president shall appoint twelve of the fifteen members of the Constitutional Court, one-fourth of the members of the Council of State, the Chief Public Prosecutor and the Deputy Chief Public Prosecutor of the Court of Cassation and four out of 13 members of the Council of Judges and Prosecutors.

The president performs also the duties of selection and appointment, and other duties conferred by the Constitution and statutes.

== Acting president ==
=== After the 2017 constitutional referendum ===
According to the constitutional amendments approved in the 2017 referendum, in the event of a temporary absence of the president on account of illness, travel abroad or similar circumstances, the vice president of Turkey serves as acting president, and exercises the powers of the president until the president comes back. If the office of the presidency becomes vacant for any reason, the presidential election shall be held within forty-five days and in the meantime, the vice president shall act as and exercise the powers of the president until the next president is elected. If one year or less remains for the general election, the parliamentary election will be conducted at the same time. If more than a year remains, the newly elected president will continue to serve until the next general election.

=== Before the 2017 constitutional referendum ===
Before the constitutional amendments approved in the 2017 referendum, the speaker of the Grand National Assembly served as Acting President in cases where the presidency is temporarily or permanently vacant and exercises presidential powers until the president returns to duty or the new president is elected within 45 days.

== Latest election ==
Presidential elections were held in Turkey in May 2023, alongside parliamentary elections, to elect a president for a term of five years.

== Timeline of presidents ==
The following timeline depicts the progression of the presidents and their political affiliation at the time of assuming office.

== See also ==
- President of Northern Cyprus
- Official state car
- Presidential Guard Regiment
- List of cabinets of Turkey
