= Presidential standard of Turkey =

Standard of the President
- Use: Presidential standard
- Proportion: 2:3
- Adopted: 1925
- Design: Flag of Turkey with the addition of a presidential seal
- Designed by: Hüsnü Tengüz

The presidential standard of Turkey is the official flag that represents the President of Turkey in his capacity as the head of state and commander-in-chief of the Turkish Armed Forces. This distinctive flag, also known as the Presidential Flag, is an emblem of the authority and dignity vested in the office of the President.

== History ==
The use of a presidential standard in Turkey dates back to the establishment of the Republic of Turkey in 1923. Initially, the presidential standard closely resembled the national flag of Turkey, with the addition of a gold fringe around the edges to distinguish it from the standard flag. The first document to regulate the Presidential Standard officially is the Flag Regulation issued on October 22, 1925. In this regulation, the definition of the Presidential Standard is provided.

The origin of the coat of arms and emblem used today is attributed to Hüsnü Tengüz, the Chief Engraver of the Naval Press. Upon the order of Mustafa Kemal Atatürk, the production of a presidential coat of arms was requested. This request, conveyed to the Naval Press from the Istanbul Military Tailoring House.

On May 29, 1936, Law No. 2994 on the Turkish Flag was enacted, and on September 14, 1937, Regulation No. 2/7175 on the Turkish Flag was accepted. In the annex referred to in Article 36 of this regulation, it is stated that the sun rays in the Presidential Standard are ten each (ten oval, ten pointed). The dimensions of the standard are 70 cm by 70 cm.

Later, with an Additional Regulation to the Regulation on the Turkish Flag, the dimensions of the standard were determined as 30 cm by 30 cm. This time, with the enforcement of the Regulation Amending the Regulation on the Turkish Flag on February 18, 1978, two new amendments were made. The sun rays in the center of the standard are arranged as 8 long and 8 short rays, lined up in the sequence of one long, one short. It was also determined that all 16 rays, which were determined to be a total of 16, have pointed tips (triangular in shape).

The current standard is used according to Article 28 of the Regulation on the Turkish Flag dated January 25, 1985, numbered 85/9034, and the relevant example referred to in this article. The view that the sun in the Presidential Standard represents the Republic of Turkey and the 16 stars represent the independent Turkish states was first put forward in 1969 by Map Officer Akîp Özbek in his book "The Turkish Presidential Standard and its Meaning." This view has been accepted in the following years. In addition to this, other views have been expressed especially regarding the 16 stars. According to one view, 9 of the 16 stars represent the 9 banners used by the ancient (Central Asian) Turks, and the remaining 7 stars represent the 7 banners used by the Anatolian Turks. Thus, the total of 9+7 equals 16.

Version depicted in the flag encyclopedia Flaggenbuch of 1939.

Historical dimensions until 2012

== Design and symbolism ==
The Presidential Standard of Turkey features a red field with a white star and crescent emblem in the center. The star and crescent are traditional symbols of Turkish identity and are deeply rooted in the country's history and culture. The red background symbolizes valor, courage, and the blood shed by the nation's defenders throughout history.

The star and crescent emblem is positioned prominently in the center of the flag, with the star pointing upwards and the crescent facing to the right. This orientation of the star and crescent is consistent with the design of the national flag of Turkey, which also features these symbols.

In Article 27 of the "Turkish Flag Regulation," numbered 85/9034 and dated January 25, 1985, the dimensions of were specified by the cabinet of Turkey.

Graphic construction of the flag

Graphic construction of the emblem

Design limits
Element	Explanation		Measurement
Star and crescent	A	Distance from the outer circle of the moon to the zenith	G/4
Star and crescent	B	Diameter of the outer circle of the moon	G/2
Star and crescent	C	Distance between the centers of the outer and inner circles of the moon	G/16
Star and crescent	D	Diameter of the inner circle of the moon	G/2.5
Star and crescent	E	The distance of the star circle to the point where it intersects the axis in the direction of the inner circle of the moon	G/3
Star and crescent	F	Diameter of the circle of the star	G/4
Width	G	Short side of the flag	G
Length	Ğ	Long side of the flag	G*1.5
Seal	H	Distance from the center of the sun to the zenith	G/5.3333
Seal	I	Distance from the center of the sun to the upper edge	G/5.3333
Seal	J	Diameter of the circle at the center of the sun	G/12.17656
Seal	K	Diameter of the circle passing through the end of the sun's 8 short rays	G/7.557864
Seal	L	Diameter of the circle passing through the ends of the 8 long rays of the sun	G/6
Seal	M	Diameter of the circle passing through small star centers	G/4.31872
Seal	N	Diameter of the circle of small stars (16 pieces)	G/30

The exact black, gold, and red colors to be used in the emblem are specified with reference to the regulations.

Color specifications
Name	PMS	RGB				CMYK			
Name	PMS	R	G	B	8-bit hex	C	M	Y	K
Black		0	0	0	#000000	0	0	0	100
Matt Gold Foil		192	181	68	#C0B544	18	23	71	8
Pantone Red	032 C	242	0	0	#F20000	5	100	100	0

== Usage and protocol ==
The presidential standard of Turkey is displayed whenever the President is present at official ceremonies, events, or functions. It is also hoisted on official buildings, residences, and vehicles associated with the President.

According to protocol, the presidential standard is afforded the same level of respect and reverence as the national flag of Turkey. It is saluted by military personnel and civilians alike as a symbol of the highest office in the country.

== Related symbols ==
In addition to the presidential standard, the Turkish president may also use other symbols and emblems to represent the office and authority of the presidency. These may include the Presidential Seal, which is used on official documents and communications, as well as other emblems of Turkey, which features the star and crescent emblem along with other national symbols.

== Gallery ==
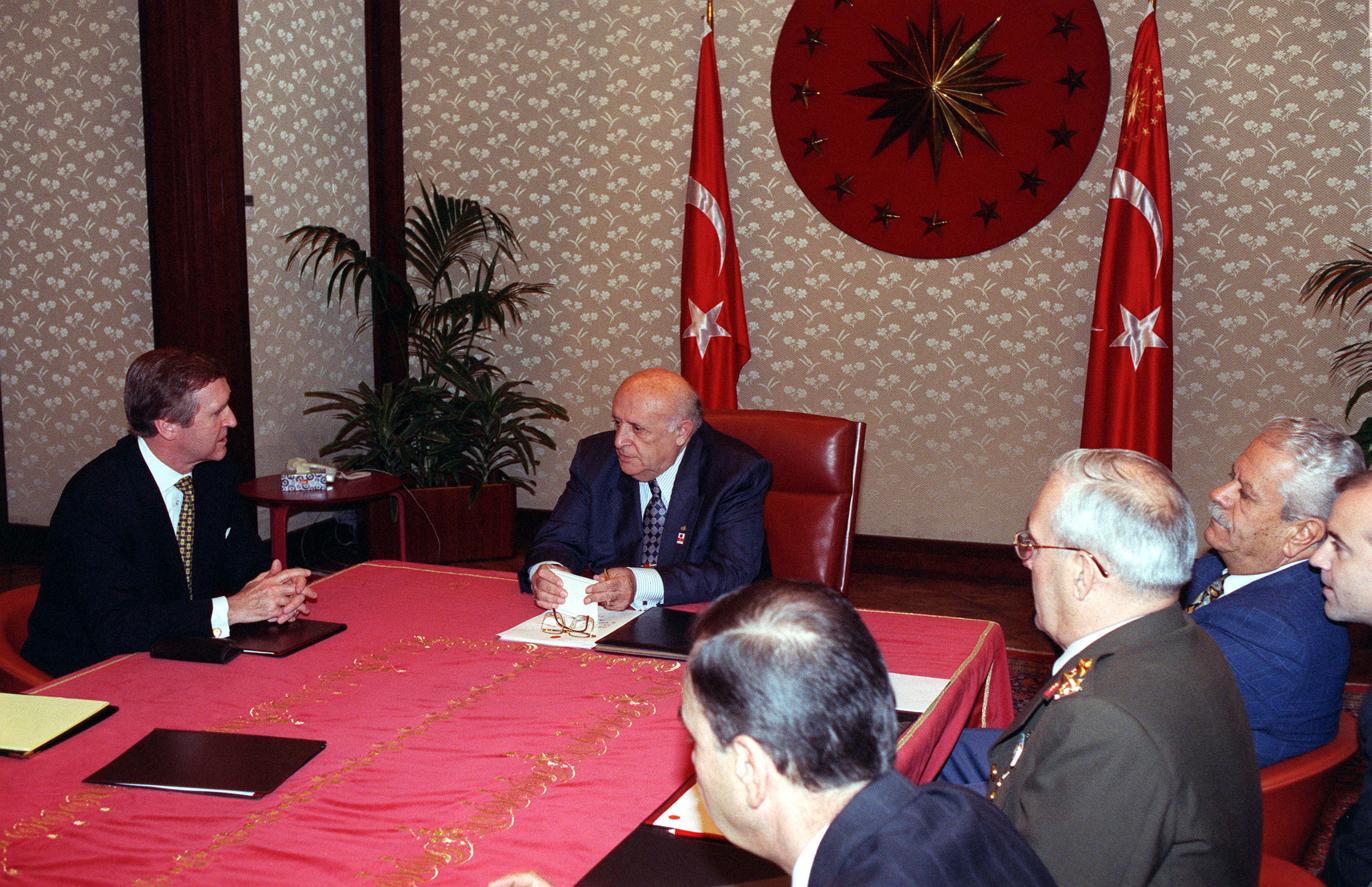
The Turkish flag and the Presidential Standard behind the 9th President Süleyman Demirel.

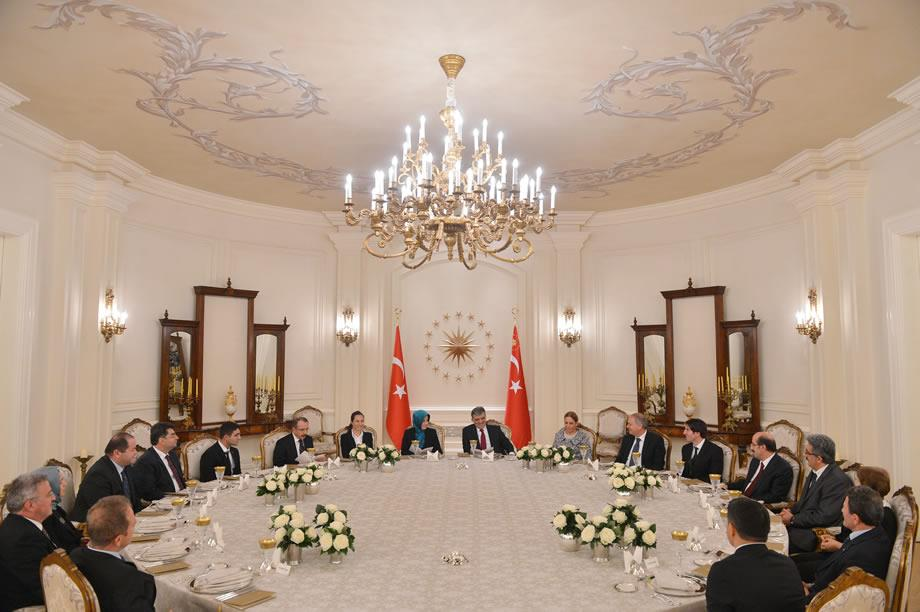
The Turkish flag and the Presidential Standard behind the 11th President Abdullah Gül

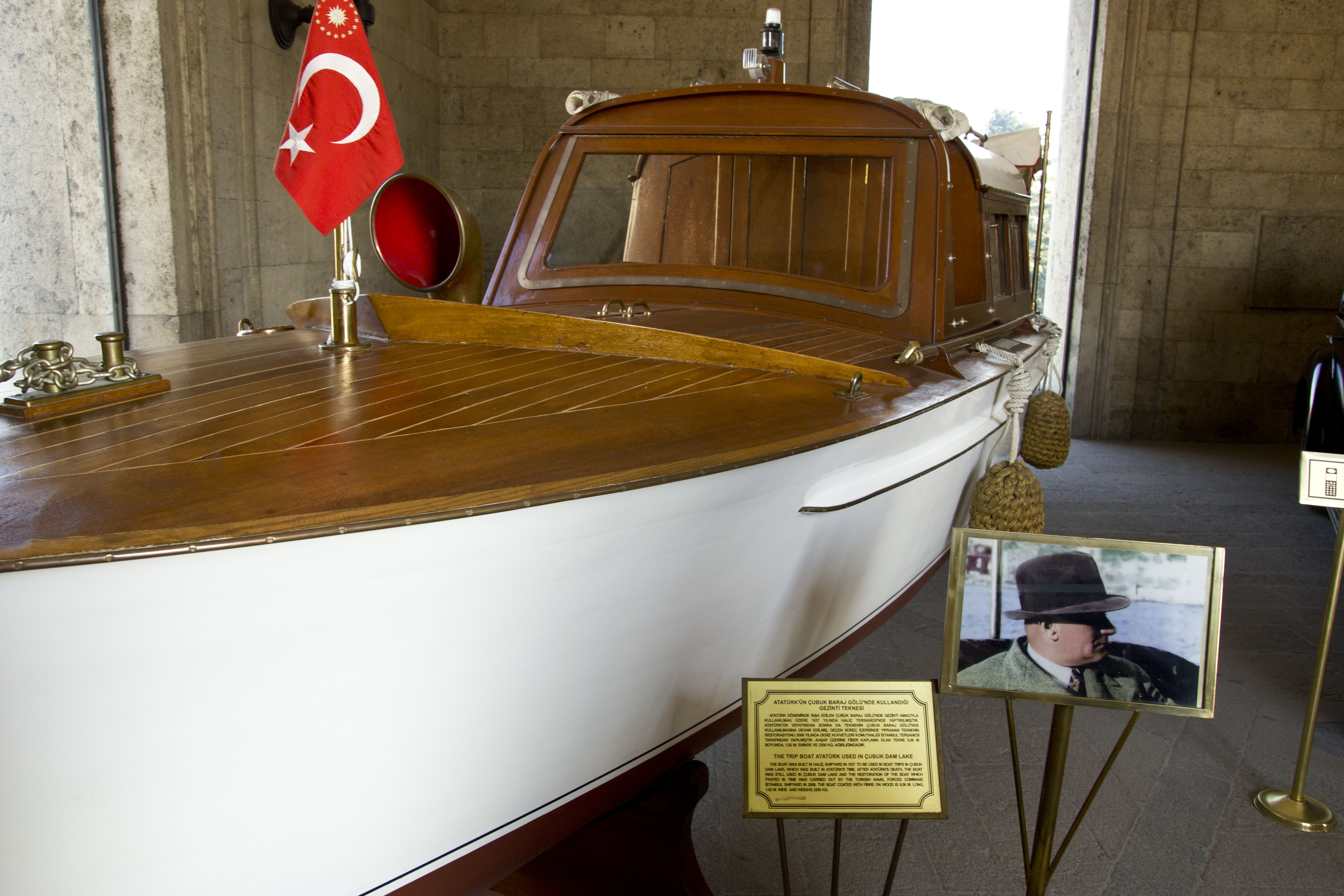
The Presidential Standard hanging on Atatürk's yacht.

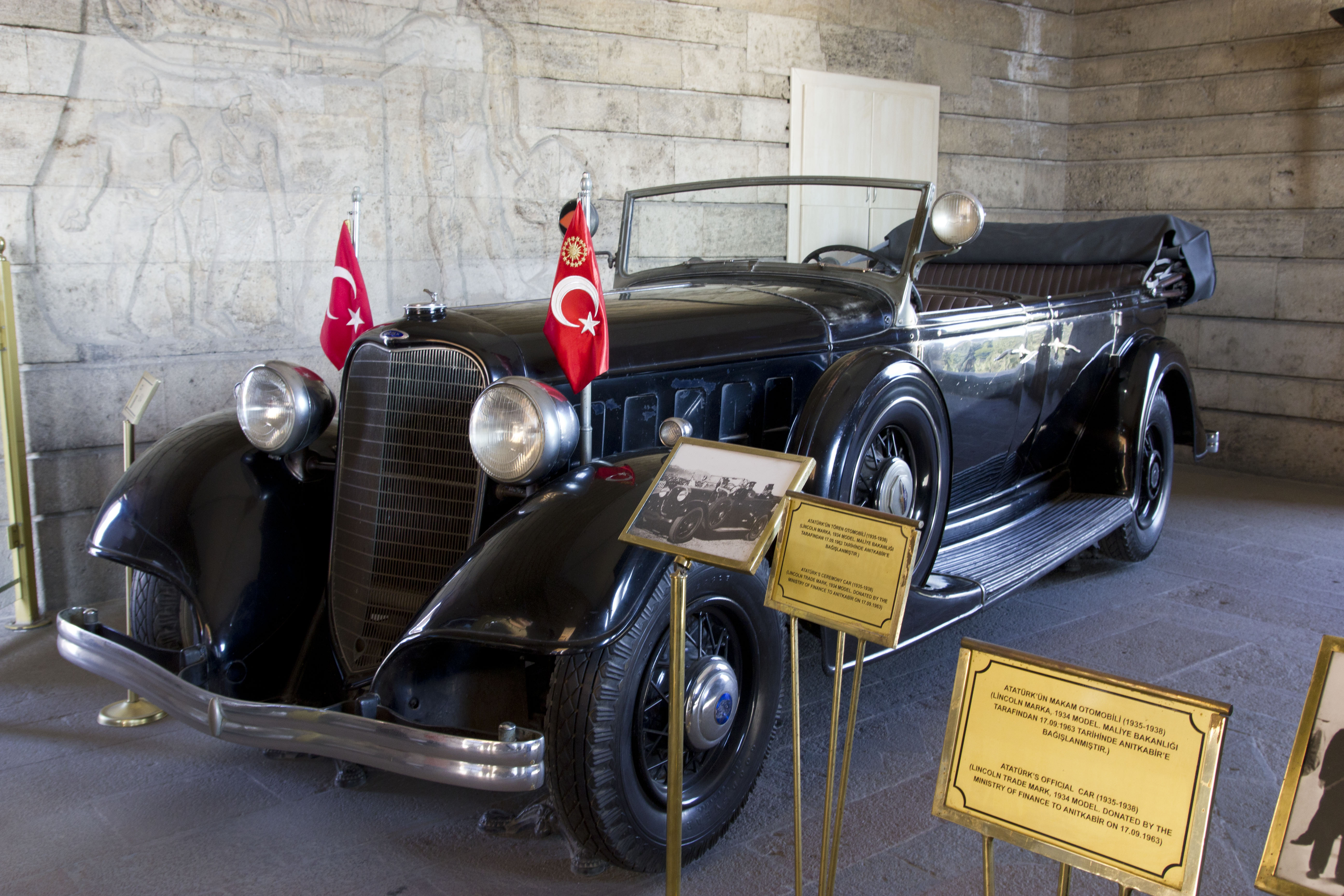
The Turkish flag and the Presidential Standard hanging in Atatürk's official vehicle.

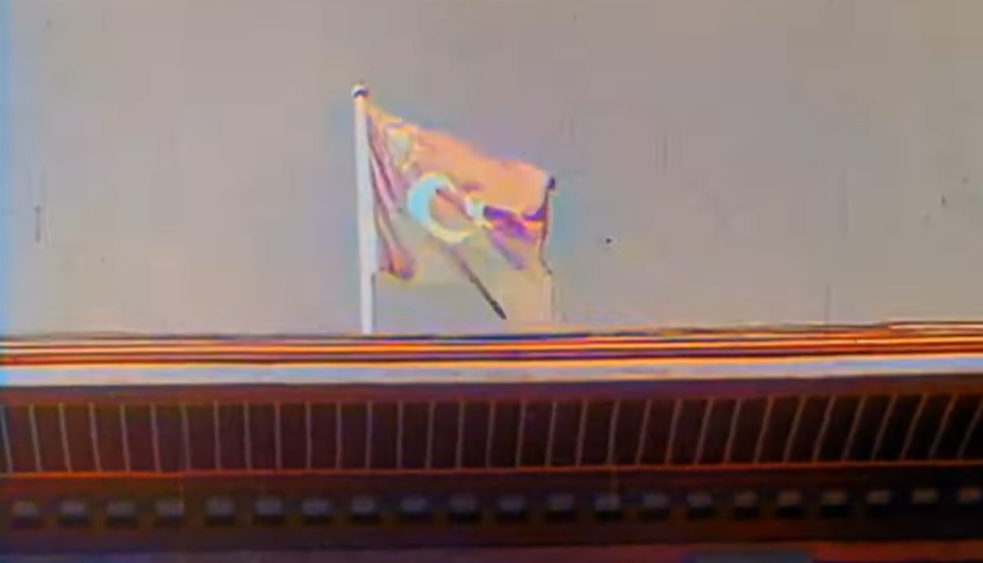
The presidential standard hoisted in the Parliament building during the opening of the Grand National Assembly of Turkey by Atatürk in 1937.

== See also ==
- Flag of Turkey
- Presidential Seal of Turkey
- 16 Great Turkic Empires
