= Baku Turkish Martyrs' Memorial =

Cemetery in Azerbaijan

- Turkish: Bakü Türk Şehitleri Anıtı
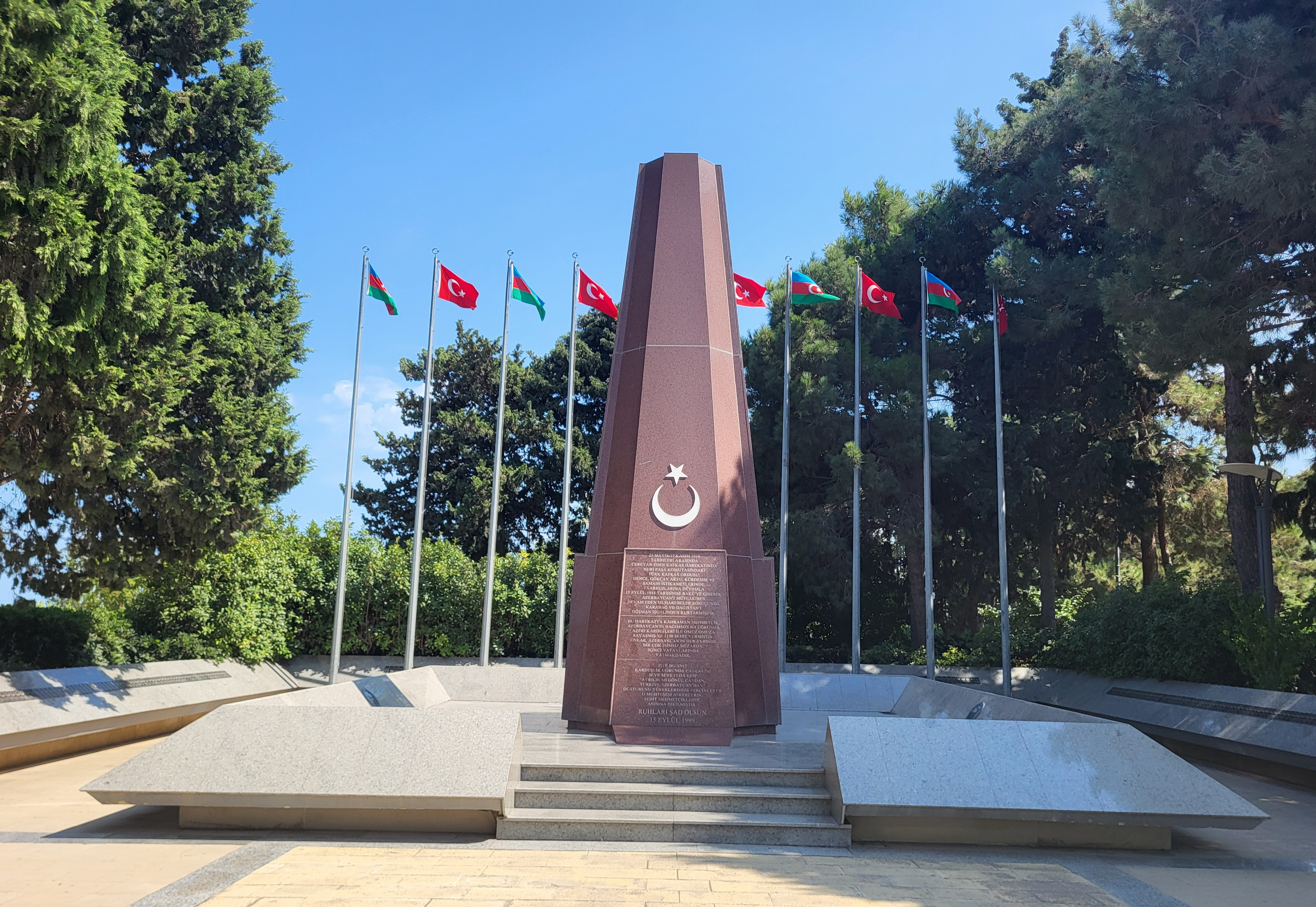
- The memorial in the Martyrs' Lane
- Interactive map of Baku Turkish Martyrs' Memorial
- Location: Baku, Azerbaijan
- Coordinates: 40°21′28″N 49°49′40″E
- Designer: Hüseyin Bütüner; Hilmi Güner
- Type: Monument
- Material: Red granite and white marble
- Opening date: September 15, 1999 (26 years ago)
- Dedicated to: Ottoman Army soldiers killed in the Battle of Baku (1918)

The Baku Turkish Martyrs' Memorial (Azerbaijani: Bakı Türk Şəhidliyi, Turkish: Bakü Türk Şehitleri Anıtı) is a memorial dedicated to the Ottoman soldiers killed during the World War I in Azerbaijan. It is situated within the Martyrs' Lane (Azerbaijani: Şəhidlər Xiyabanı) in Baku. It consists of a monument, an alley with name plates of the martyrs and a mosque.

== Overview ==
1,130 Turkish soldiers and officers of the Army of Islam were killed in action in the Battle of Baku of Caucasus Campaign, who fought alongside the Azerbaijani forces against the Bolsheviks–Armenian Dashnaks and Baku Soviets in 1918.

The monument was designed by Turkish architects Hüseyin Bütüner and Hilmi Güner in the form of a two-story pyramidal frustum with square bases, of which truncated corners are carved out so that it appears as a sort of octagonal frustum. It is covered by red granite having star and crescent figures made of pure white marble on each of the four main faces that resembles the Turkish national flag. On one side, an inscription is carved underneath the star and crescent figure. On the flagpoles behind the monument, flags of Turkey and Azerbaijan wave. On the surrounding walls of the alley to the monument, the names of the martyrs with their military rank, hometown and death place are displayed side by side. A mosque, built by the Turkish Presidency of Religious Affairs and opened on June 28, 1996, is situated next to the monument. The inauguration of the monument took place in presence of Turkish President Süleyman Demirel and Azerbaijani President Heydar Aliyev with a prestigious ceremony on September 15, 1999.

Martyrs' Mosque, near the Turkish Memorial

A fountain in the mosque yard was demolished by the governor of Baku following tensions in the Azerbaijan–Turkey relations in 2001.

In April 2009, the nearby Mosque of the Martyrs was closed by Azerbaijani authorities, and, as of December 2012, it was still out of use even though Mehmet Görmez, the president of the Turkish Religious Affairs, was permitted to pray in the mosque during his visit to Baku.

== See also ==
- Turkish military memorials and cemeteries outside Turkey
- Monument to Turkish soldiers
