= Turkish military memorials and cemeteries outside Turkey =

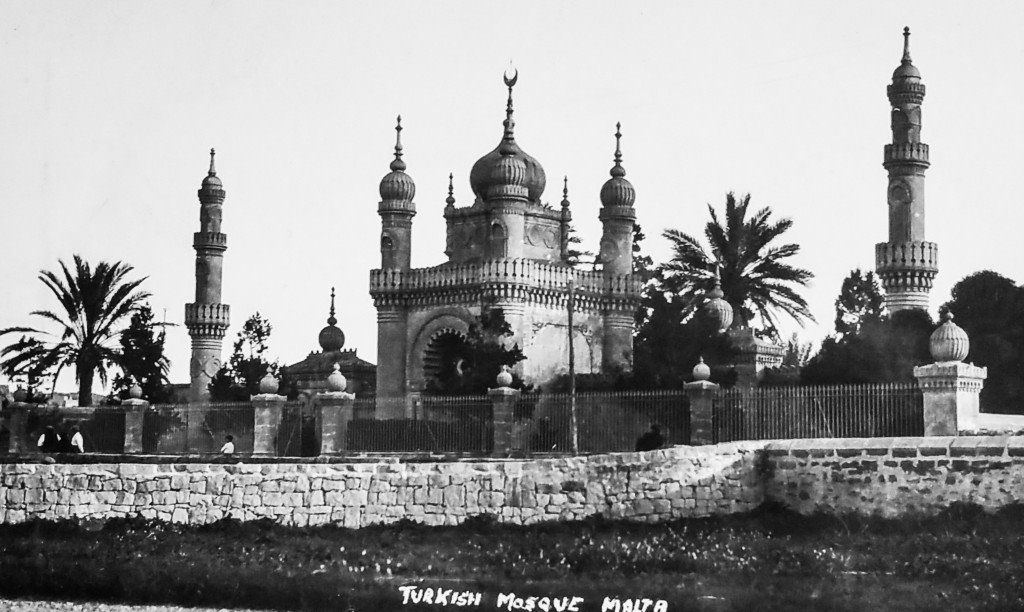
The Turkish Military Cemetery in Marsa, Malta, which was commissioned by Ottoman sultan Abdülaziz. It was built in 1873–74 to designs of the Maltese architect Emanuele Luigi Galizia, and today it is still maintained by the Turkish government.

Turkish military memorials and cemeteries outside Turkey are memorial burial grounds of Ottoman and Turkish military personnel, which are located in 34 countries on three continents.

According to the Turkish Ministry of National Defence, there exist military memorial cemeteries in Albania, Austria, Azerbaijan, Bosnia and Herzegovina, Bulgaria, Czech Republic, Egypt, Estonia, Germany, Greece, Hungary, India, Iran, Iraq, Israel, Italy, Japan, Jordan, Korea, Kosovo, Latvia, Libya, Malta, Myanmar, Northern Cyprus, Poland, Romania, Russia, Saudi Arabia, Serbia, Syria, Ukraine, United Kingdom and Yemen. Azerbaijan ranks on top with a total of nine cemeteries, followed by Northern Cyprus with eight and Ukraine with seven. Within the Israel-Palestine region, there are six cemeteries. Four cemeteries are located in Greece, three in Bulgaria, Czech Republic, Romania, Syria and the United Kingdom.

Military Cemeteries and Memorials Department (Turkish: Şehitlikler ve Anıtlar Şubesi) of the Turkish Ministry of Family and Social Policies is responsible for the maintenance and preservation of the memorial cemeteries. Cemeteries in countries far from Turkey, in which Turkish soldiers fell in Ottoman wars, are maintained and preserved by Turkish embassies.

The farmost located memorial cemeteries are Ertuğrul Memorial Cemetery in Japan, United Nations Memorial Cemetery in Busan, South Korea, the Thayetmyo War Cemetery and Meiktila War Cemetery in Myanmar.

260 sailors of the Ottoman frigate Ertuğrul, who died following a marine disaster, are buried in Japan. The Kushimoto Turkish Memorial and Museum commemorate the disaster. Around 1,600 soldiers, who were sent as prisoners of World War I and died of hard labor conditions, are interred in Myanmar. There is a monument erected in remembrance of tens of thousands Ottoman soldiers fell in Yemen during the revolts in the second half of the 19th century and South Arabia Campaign of World War I. The biggest of the three Turkish cemeteries in Syria is located in Qatma, which holds more than one thousand soldiers fell in the World War I. In the cemeteries in Cairo and Alexandria, Egypt, more than three thousand Turkish soldiers rest. In the six cemeteries located in Israel and Palestine, more than six thousand soldiers are buried, who fell in the Sinai and Palestine Campaign of World War I. 480 soldiers of the Ottoman troops, who fought on the Galicia front during World War I, are interred at the Budapest Turkish Memorial Cemetery in Hungary. The Baku Turkish Martyrs' Memorial in Azerbaijan is built in remembrance of 1,130 Ottoman troops killed in action against Bolshevik and Armenian forces in the Battle of Baku in 1918.

After World War II, Turkey sent the Turkish Brigade to support the United Nations Command in the Korean War. Some 462 Turkish casualties from that war are buried at the United Nations Memorial Cemetery in Busan, Republic of Korea.
