= Martyrs' Lane =

Cemetery in Baku, Azerbaijan

- Azerbaijani State Government
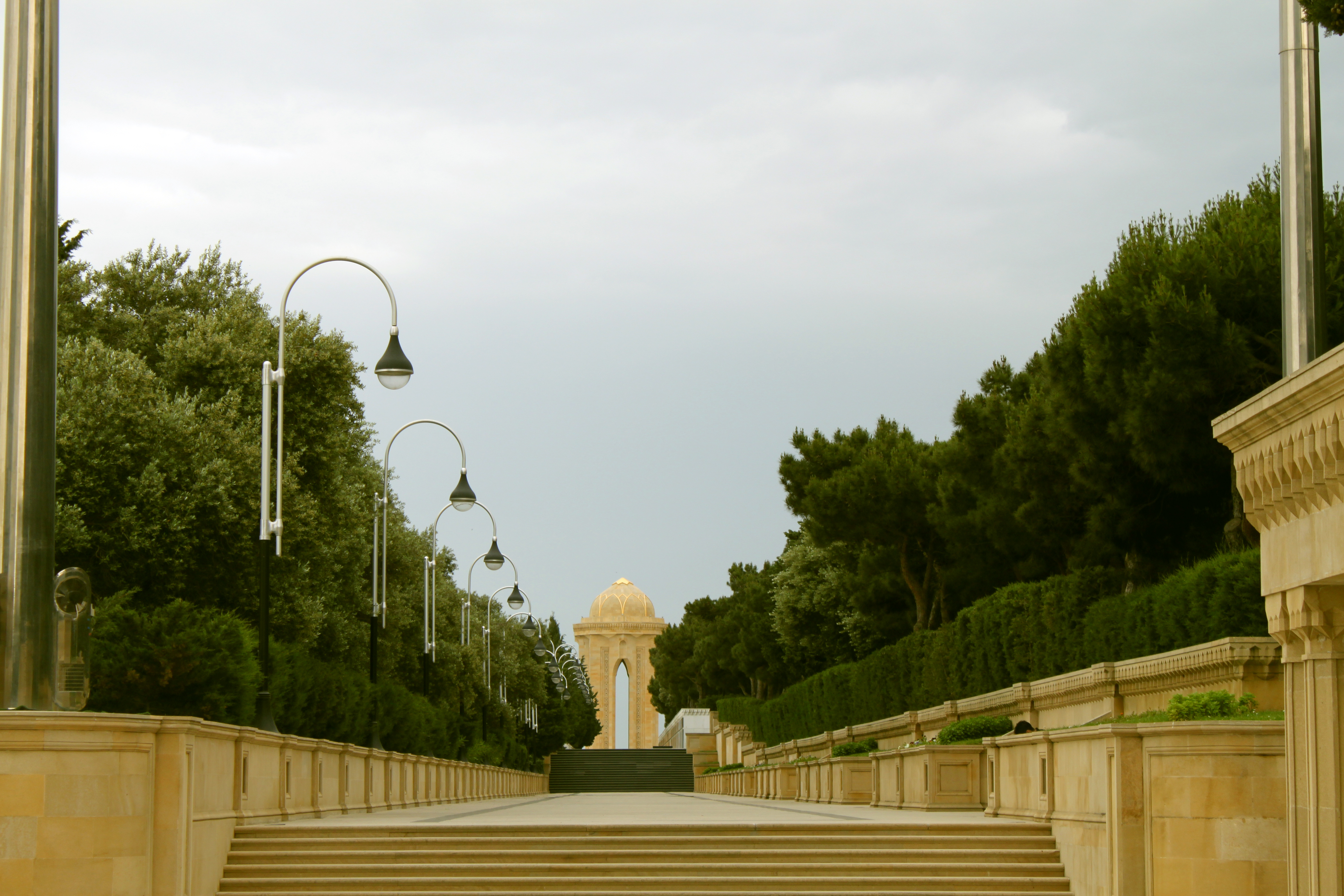
- View of the cemetery from the memorial.
- Used for those deceased Caucasus campaign, March Days, Black January and the First Nagorno-Karabakh War
- Established: January 21, 1990
- Location: 40°21′24″N 49°49′42″E near Baku, Azerbaijan
- Total burials: 15,000

Burials by nation
- Azerbaijan: approximately 14,000; Turkey: 1130; British: 92

Burials by war
- Caucasus Campaign: min. 1130; Black January: 126; First Nagorno-Karabakh War: unknown

Martyrs' Lane or Alley of Martyrs (Azerbaijani: Şəhidlər Xiyabanı), formerly known as the Kirov Park, is a cemetery and memorial in Baku, Azerbaijan dedicated to those killed by the Soviet Army during Black January 1990 and in the First Nagorno-Karabakh War of 1988–1994.

== History ==
In the closing days of World War I, fighting broke out in Baku as a result of the Russian Civil War, with four groups fighting for control of the area when the Russian Empire collapsed. Fighting each other were the Bolsheviks, Mensheviks, Armenians and Azerbaijanis. Many people were killed in the fighting including some from a small British force sent to prevent Baku falling into the hands of the Russians. The Martyrs' Lane site first served as Muslim cemetery for victims of the March Events of 1918.

The cemetery was completely destroyed and the corpses removed after the Bolsheviks came to power, who created an amusement park on the site and installed a statue of Sergei Kirov, the prominent Bolshevik leader. After the collapse of the Soviet Union, the statue and the amusement park facilities were removed and the location was reinstated as a burial site for national heroes. The first buried at the newly instated memorial were those who had died during the Black January events of 1990 when Soviet forces invaded Baku.

The memorial was next used for the burial of the bodies of men who died in the First Nagorno-Karabakh War, an armed conflict that took place from February 1988 to May 1994, in the small enclave of Nagorno-Karabakh in southwestern Azerbaijan, between the ethnic Armenians of Nagorno-Karabakh backed by Armenia, and the Republic of Azerbaijan.

== Design ==
It is estimated that approximately 15,000 people are buried in the cemetery. It is located on a hill in the south of the city overlooking the Caspian Sea. It is considered a shrine to those who have given their lives for Azerbaijan's independence and attracts thousands of visitors each year.

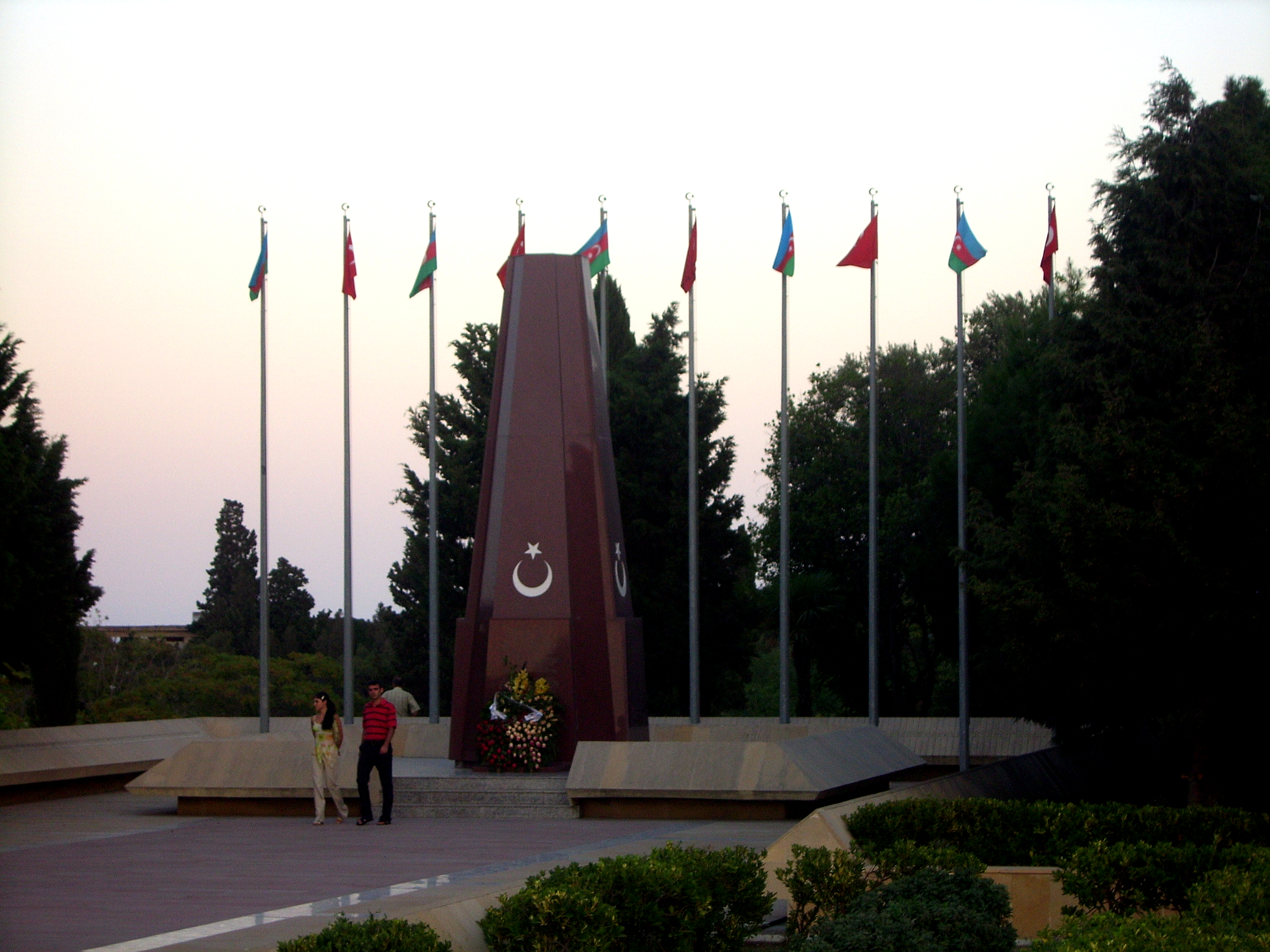
Memorial to the Turkish soldiers who were killed in combat

== Memorials ==
The Eternal Flame Memorial is located at Martyrs' lane and is frequently visited by Azerbaijani presidents and other dignitaries.

Martyrs' Lane is also home to Baku Turkish Martyrs' Memorial, a large memorial to the 1,130 Turkish troops who were killed while fighting Bolshevik and Armenian forces during the Battle of Baku in 1918. Next to the memorial there is a martyrs mosque, also built by Turks. The memorial contains a hexagonal block clad in red granite; each face contains a pure white marble crescent-star, based on those in the Turkish national flag. It was unveiled by the former Turkish president Süleyman Demirel and the Azerbaijani president Heydar Aliyev at a formal ceremony in September, 1999.

Not far from the Turkish memorial there is a small wall acknowledging the British soldiers killed during the same conflict.

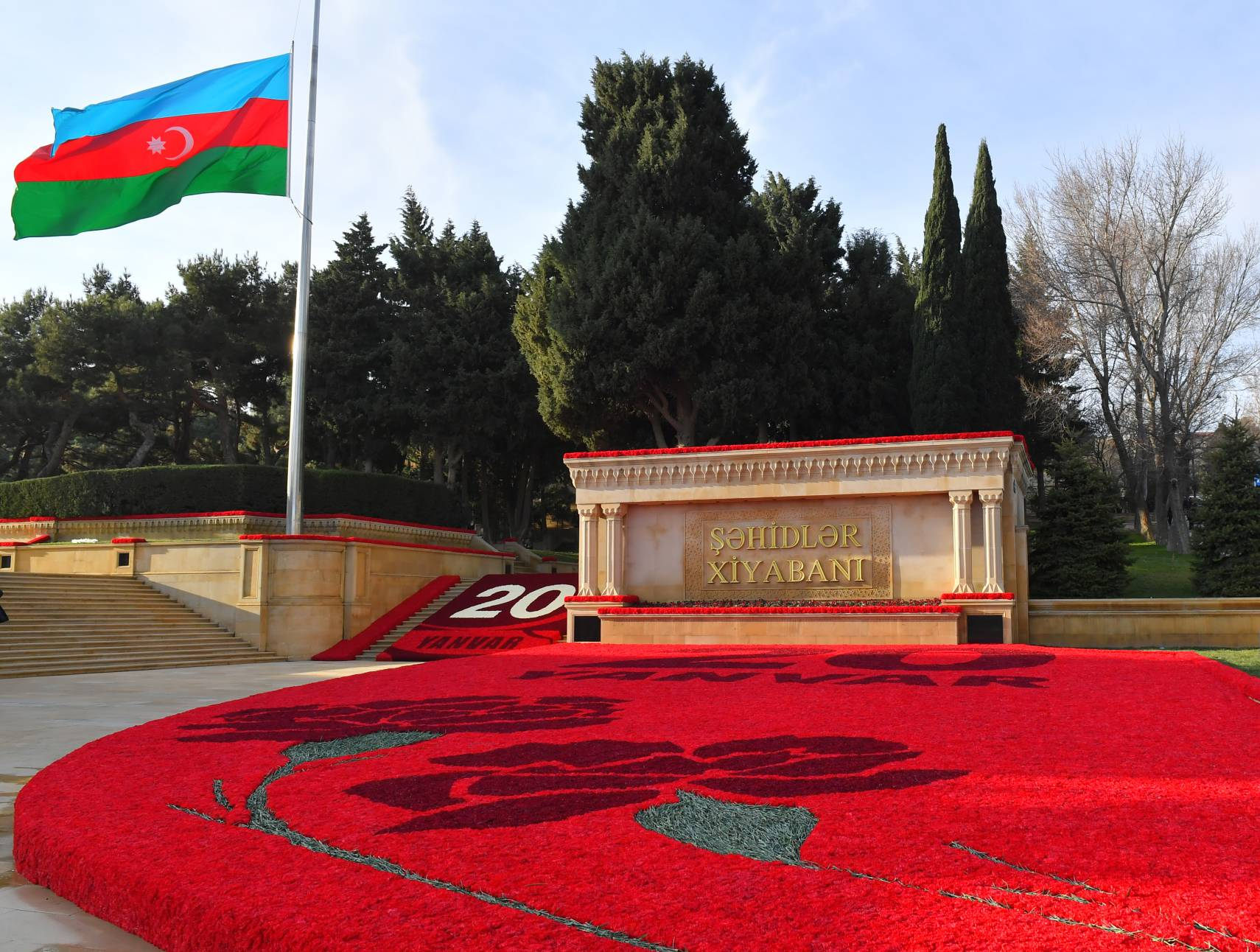
Martyrs' Lane January 20, 2024

== Eternal Flame Memorial Complex ==
The proposal to establish the Eternal Flame Memorial was put forward in 1994. The Parliament of Azerbaijan, on the initiative of President Aliyev, subsequently agreed to erect a national monument in memory of Azerbaijani martyrs. Aliyev personally oversaw the project. During the exhibition on the fifth anniversary of Black January, three proposals, including one by sculptor Omar Eldarov, were submitted to the President; he requested several more proposals. The proposal developed by the architect Elbay Gasimzade won the competition. On August 5, 1998, President Aliyev issued an order to erect an Eternal Flame monument in the Alley of Martyrs with funding of 2 billion AZN.

The monument was inaugurated on October 9, 1998. The memorial complex is composed of a tomb standing on an 8-pointed star crown with a gold-framed glass dome. In 2007, the columns of the Eternal Flame were heightened and parts of the octangular star and eight-pointed mirror were made of gold.

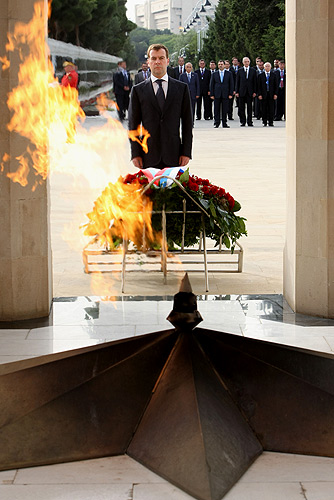
President Dmitry Medvedev at the Eternal Flame monument

== Notable burials ==
The first tomb in the entrance of Martyrs' Lane belongs to married couple Fariza and Ilham Allahverdiyev, who died during Black January. Ilham was shot dead by Soviet troops and Fariza committed suicide after hearing of her husband's death. The tomb has become a symbol of fidelity and love. The cemetery also contains the graves of the journalists Chingiz Mustafayev and Salatyn Asgarova, who were killed during the First Nagorno-Karabakh War.

== Gallery ==
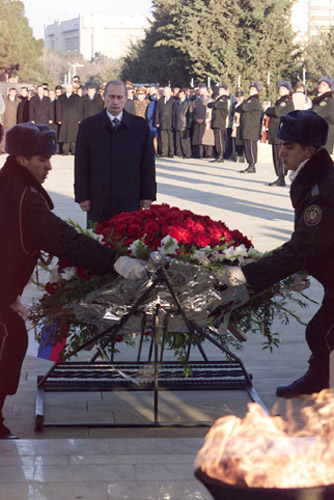
President Vladimir Putin laying a wreath at the memorial.

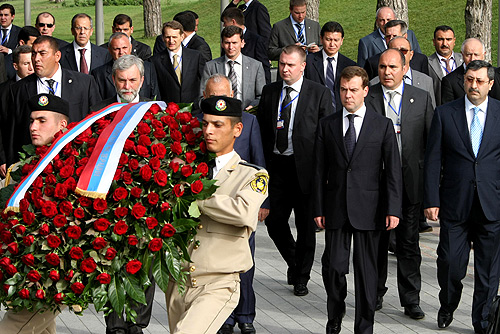
President Dmitry Medvedev laying a wreath at the Eternal Flame monument.

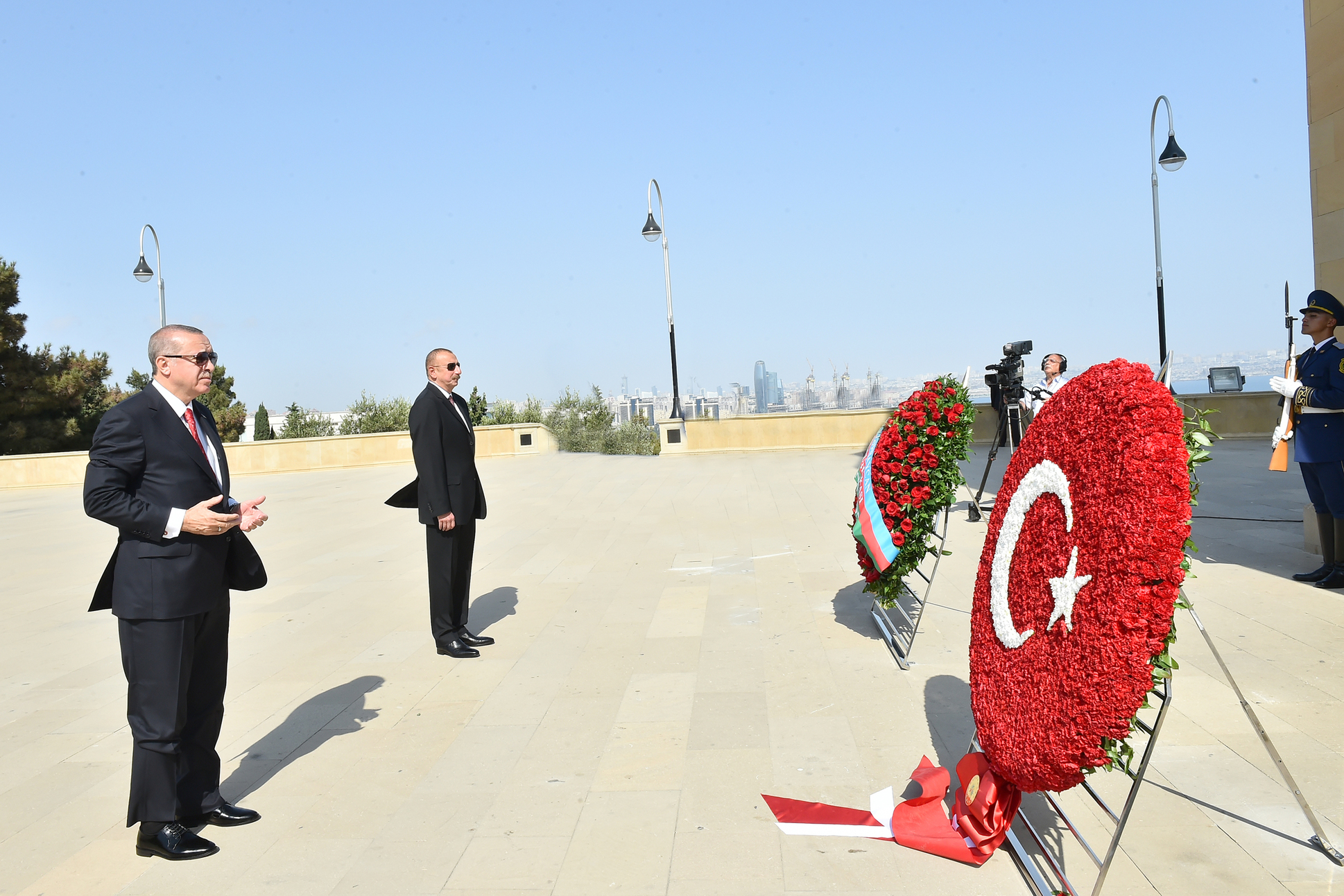
Recep Tayyip Erdoğan and Ilham Aliyev at the memorial

Mosque of the Martyrs

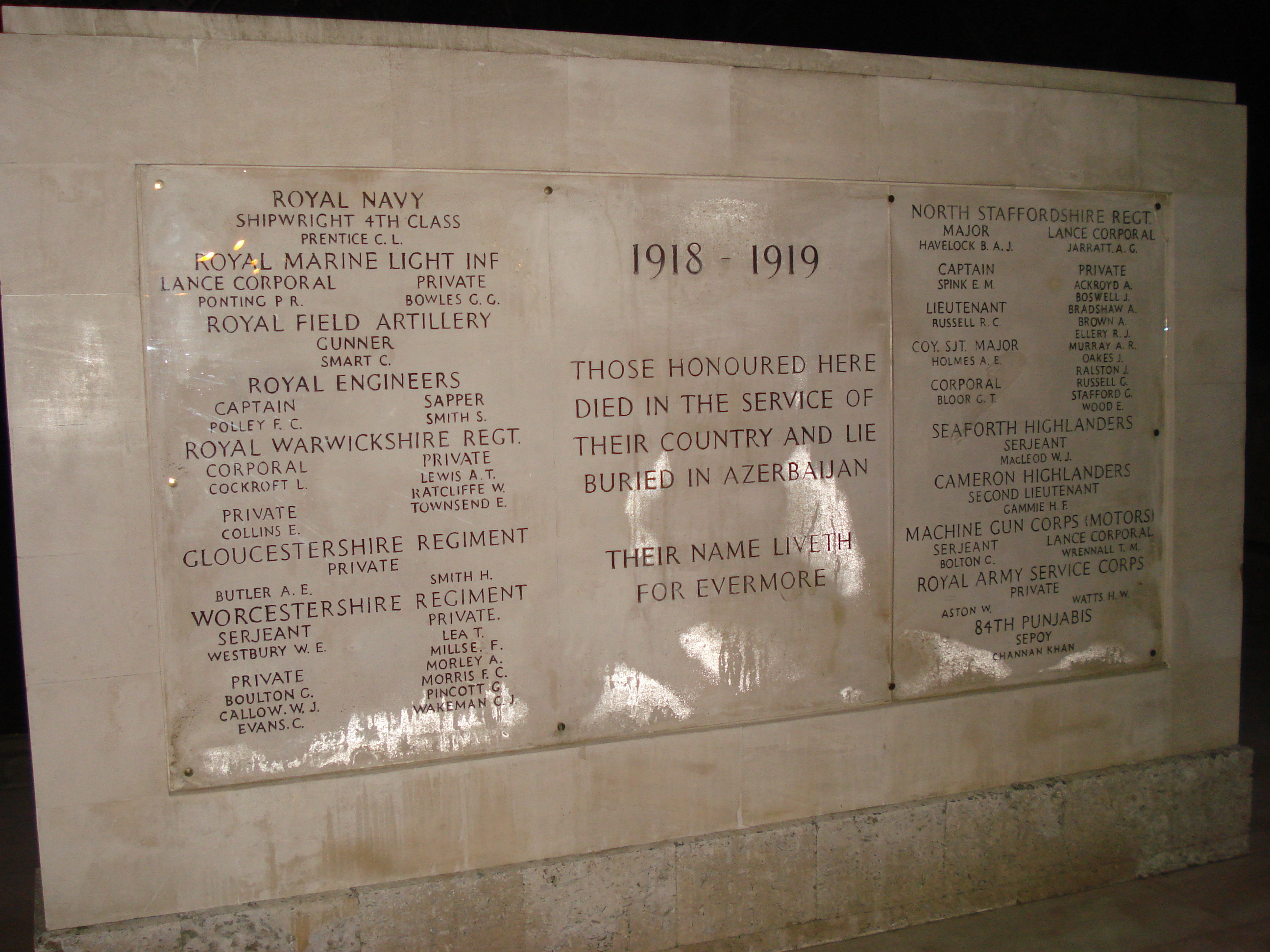
Memorial to the British soldiers.

== See also ==
- Khojaly Massacre
- Chemberekend Cemetery
