= Budapest Turkish Memorial Cemetery =

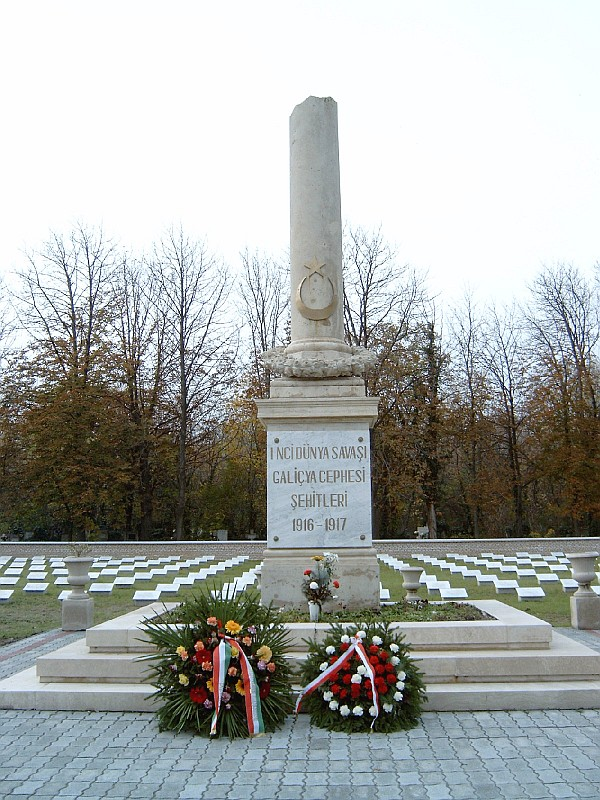
- Turkish monument in the section
- Interactive map of Budapest Turkish Memorial Cemetery

Details
- Established: 1926
- Location: Kőbánya, Budapest
- Country: Hungary
- Coordinates: 47.472°N 19.189°E
- Type: Turkish military of WWI
- Size: 4,598 m^{2} (1.136 acres)
- No. of graves: 480

The Budapest Turkish Memorial Cemetery (Turkish: Budapeşte Türk Şehitliği) is a burial ground of Ottoman soldiers in Hungary. It is situated as a section within Budapest's largest cemetery of New Public Cemetery (Hungarian: Új köztemető) at Kőbánya district of the city. Ottoman soldiers are buried in the cemetery, who participated on the Galicia front during the World War I.

Established in 1926, the Turkish Memorial Cemetery holds 480 soldiers of Ottoman Army's XV Corps, who fought in Galicia as part of the Central Powers under the command of German Empire's South Army in the summer of 1916. Eleven graves are of unknown soldiers. The cemetery is walled and covers an area of 4,598 m^{2} (1.136 acres) with a graveyard section of 1,718 m^{2} (0.425 acres). A plate on the entrance denotes the property. The flag of Turkey waves on a flagpole in the cemetery.

Commemoration ceremonies are held at site every year on March 18, the Martyrs' Day in Turkey, by Turkish officials and on November 1, the All Saints' Day, by Hungarians. High ranked Turkish politicians officially visiting Budapest pay tribute to the burials at the Turkish Cemetery.

For the preservation and maintenance of the memorial cemetery, the Turkish Military Cemeteries and Memorials Department (Turkish: Şehitlikler ve Anıtlar Şubesi) of the Ministry of Family and Social Policies is responsible.

== See also ==
- Turkish military memorials and cemeteries outside Turkey
