= Eternal Flame (Azerbaijan) =

Coordinates: 40.68880°N 46.33958°E

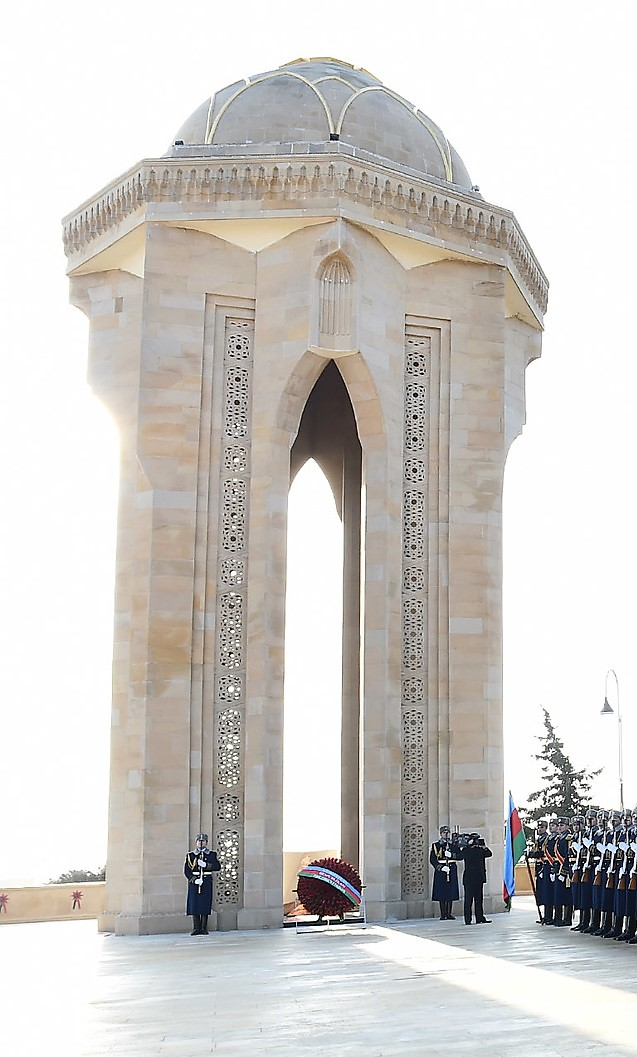
Eternal Flame in 2019

Eternal Flame is a monument that was established for the Azerbaijanis who died during Black January. The monument is situated in Martyrs’ Line, Baku. Every year Azerbaijanis commemorate Black January in that place.

== History ==
The initial idea for the establishment of the monument for martyrs originated in 1994. Heydar Aliyev was the initiator of the project and created the special commission for this issue. Two projects were presented to the president in the annual commemoration. One of the projects was presented by the sculptor Omer Eldarov. During these years the economic conditions were severe in the country and the main requirement for the monument was low cost. These two projects did not meet that requirement and so the project was delayed. Over the next years, new ideas were offered and the project created by the company led by sculptor Elbay Gasimzadeh won.

The monument was built in accordance with a presidential decree dated on August 5, 1998. The value of the monument is two billion manats. The opening ceremony was held on the 9th of October 1998.

In 2007 the monument of Eternal Flame was restored and revised. The columns of the monument became higher and golden parts were added to the eight-pointed stars.

== Description of the monument ==
Eternal Flame is standing on an eight-pointed star and over a flame, there is a golden tomb with a glass dome.

== Gallery ==
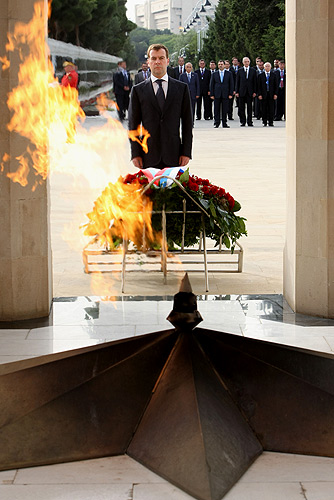
Visit of the Russian President in 2008

== See also ==
- Baku Turkish Martyrs' Memorial
