= Emblems of Turkey =

Unofficial symbol

Emblem of Turkey
- Unofficial emblem of Turkey
- Armiger: Turkey
- Shield: A crescent and star.
- Use: Unofficial and Turkish passport.

Turkey has no official national emblem, but the crescent and star (Turkish: ay yıldız, lit. 'crescent-star') design from the national flag is in use on Turkish passports, Turkish identity cards and at the diplomatic missions of Turkey.

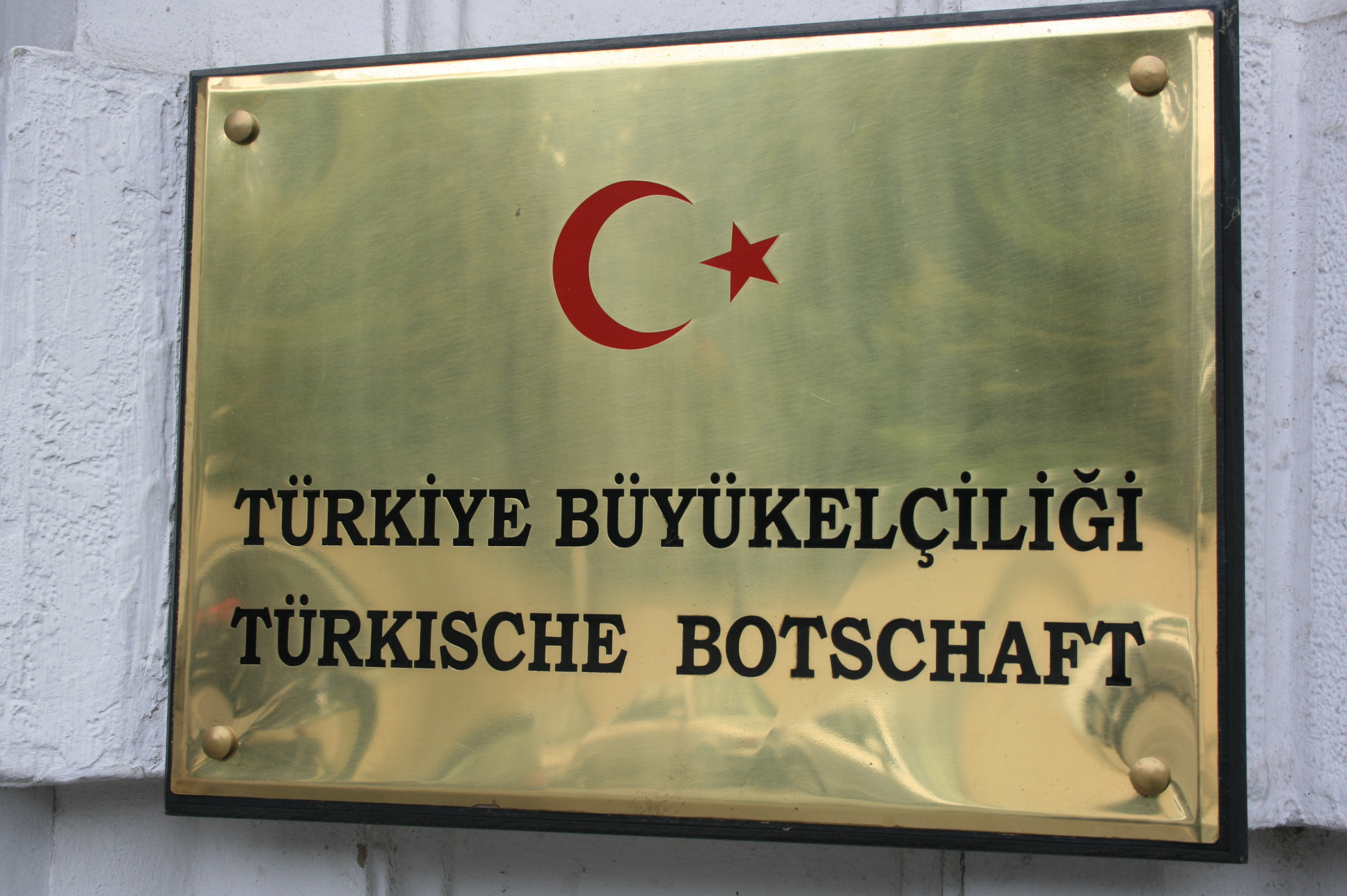
The crescent and star, seen at the Turkish embassy in Vienna, Austria.

The crescent and star are from the 19th-century Ottoman flag (1844–1923) which also forms the basis of the present-day Turkish flag. Following the abolition of the Sultanate on 1 November 1922, the Ottoman coat of arms was no longer used and the crescent and star became Turkey's de facto national emblem. In the national identity cards of the 1930s the horns of the crescent were facing left, instead of the now more common orientation towards right.

== History ==
The crescent and star on Turkish passports

The coat of arms of the Sultan was abolished from usage after the abolition of the Ottoman sultanate in 1922. In its stead, the star and crescent on the flag was adopted. Three years later, in 1925, Ministry of Education opened a contest for determining another official coat of arms and artist Namık İsmail's design won. İsmail's design featured a red shield charged with a white star and crescent. Underneath there was a grey wolf, connected to Oghuz Turkic mythology, standing on a spear. The shield was surrounded by a garland of wheat and oak leaves, with a medallion depicting Ottoman alphabet letters ت and ج for "توركیه جمهوریتی" (Türkiye Cumhuriyeti), Republic of Turkey. Above the shield was placed a lit torch, symbolising the country's independence. However, the new coat of arms was never registered as an official coat of arms, and was never used subsequently. A 2014 government review to develop a coat of arms has yet to result in a design, as of 2015.

Namık İsmail's proposed design

== Use by government bodies ==
=== Red circle with white star and crescent ===
A circular section of the red flag of Turkey containing the white crescent and star is used in the current emblems of a number of Turkish ministries and governmental institutions, in the emblem of the Grand National Assembly, and as the flag badge on the uniforms of Turkish national sports teams and athletes. It was also used on the old (non-digital) Turkish identity cards.

Circular flag used as a badge by the national sports teams and athletes, and for other semi- and quasi-official purposes

Seal of the Grand National Assembly (parliament)

Seal of the Prime Ministry (historic)

=== Coat of arms of the Ministry of Foreign Affairs ===
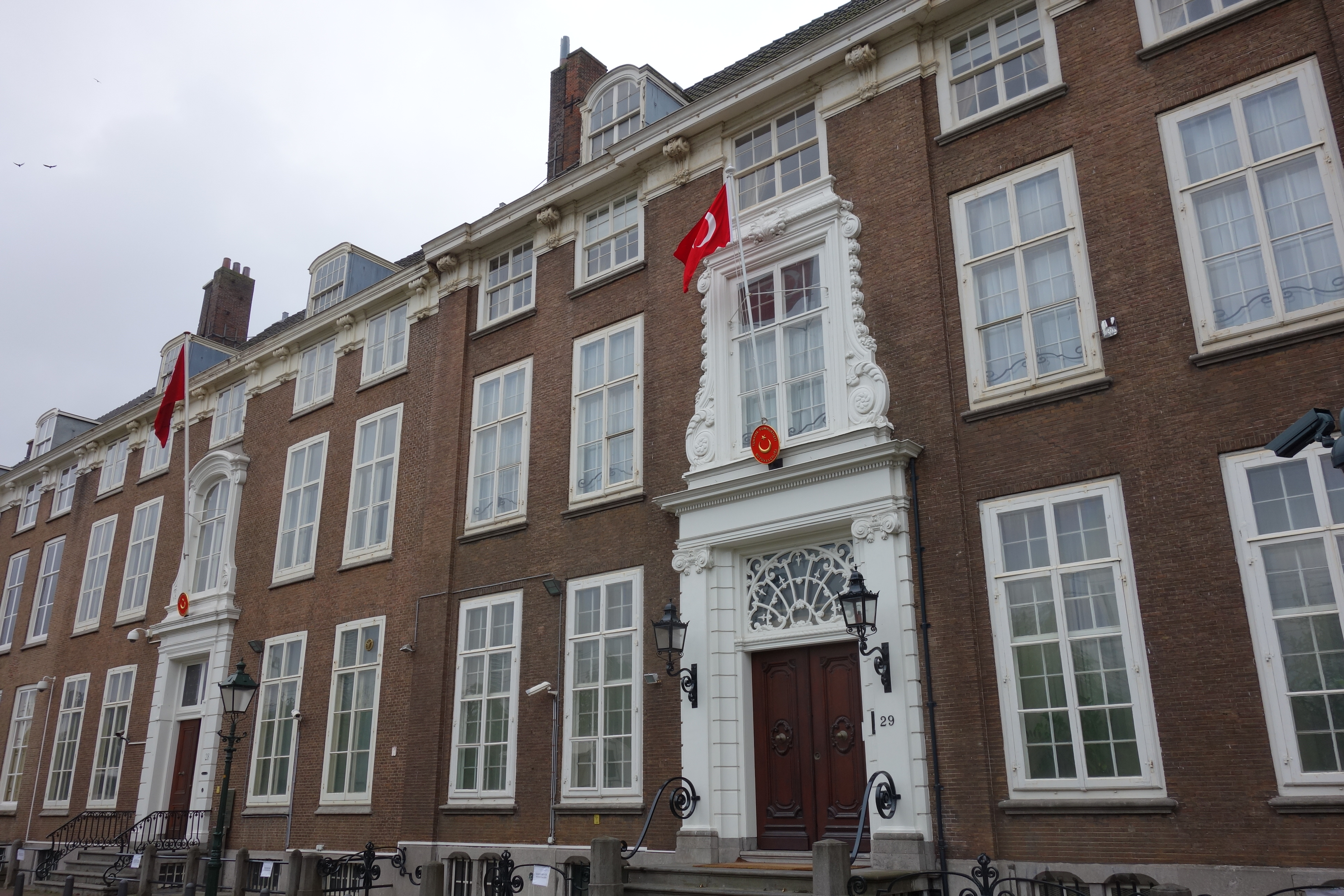
Turkish Embassy in The Hague, Netherlands, with the oval-shaped ambassadorial escutcheon (above the door), which is derived from the oval shield at the center of the Ottoman coat of arms.

The Turkish Ministry of Foreign Affairs often uses a red oval-shaped escutcheon which takes its colour from the Turkish flag, while its shape echoes the oval shield at the center of the late 19th-century Ottoman coat of arms. The escutcheon contains a gold-tone crescent and star which are vertically oriented (with the star on top) and surrounded by the gold-tone text T.C. Dışişleri Bakanlığı. A variant of this oval escutcheon (containing the gold-tone text Türkiye Cumhuriyeti Büyükelçiliği) is used by the Turkish embassies.

Seal of the Ministry of Foreign Affairs

Variant used by the Embassies

Variant used by the Consulate-Generals

=== Presidential seal ===
The seal of the president of Turkey has a large 16-pointed star in the center, which is surrounded by 16 five-pointed stars, symbolizing the 16 Great Turkic Empires. Its appearance is regulated by law.

Presidential Seal of Turkey

Presidential with no background

== See also ==
- Coat of arms of the Ottoman Empire
