= Presidential emblem of Turkey =

Emblem of the president of Turkey

Emblem of the president of the Republic of Türkiye

Versions
- Transparent version
- Armiger: President of Turkey
- Shield: A red circle featuring a large 16-pointed Sun in the center surrounded by 16 five-pointed stars.
- Use: On documents from the Turkish president, and as a symbol on presidential vehicles, podiums, and other places

The Presidential emblem of Turkey is a symbol used to represent the president of Turkey. It has a large 16-pointed Sun in the center which symbolizes the Republic of Turkey. The sun is surrounded by 16 five-pointed stars, symbolizing the 16 Great Turkic Empires in history.

== History ==
The roots of the Presidential emblem and Presidential flag of Turkey go back to September 1922, when a similar flag was used on the automobile that took Mustafa Kemal Atatürk to İzmir during the final days of the Turkish War of Independence. This flag is currently on display at the Anıtkabir Museum in Ankara. The Presidential Flag's characteristics and proportions were legalized with the Sancak Talimatnamesi law on October 22, 1925. According to this law, the Presidential emblem's dimensions were defined as "70cm x 70cm", while the Sun in the center (which looked similar to the current one) was a 20-pointed star containing 10 sharp-edged and 10 oval-edged light rays. The "70cm x 70cm" dimensions of the Presidential Seal were maintained in the Turkish Flag Law of May 29, 1936; but were later reduced to "30cm x 30cm" with a new legal amendment that was made on September 14, 1937. The number of the light rays in the Sun of the Presidential Seal were reduced to 16 (8 long and 8 short light rays, all of them sharp-edged) in order to symbolize the 16 Turkic states in history, with another legal amendment on February 18, 1978. The seal and flag took their current shape and proportions with the final legal amendment on January 25, 1985.

The 16 Great Turkic Empires are a Pan-Turkist concept introduced in 1969 by Akib Özbek. Its association with the emblem was introduced in 1985, under president Kenan Evren. Prior to this assertion, the 16 stars had been taken as representing sixteen medieval beyliks which succeeded the Seljuk Empire.

== Measurements ==
Graphic construction of the emblem

The 16 stars are aligned with a 22.5 degree angle, equidistantly surrounding the sun. One edge of each star points to the center of the sun. The unit of measurement of the emblem is the diameter of the circle around the edges of any one of the 16 stars (A). The lengths of the rays of the sun, the distance between the rays and the edges of the stars and the diameter of the outmost circle are determined as multiples of the unit A.

=== Colors ===
The exact black, gold, and red colors to be used in the emblem are specified with reference to the regulations.

Color specifications
Name	PMS	RGB				CMYK			
Name	PMS	R	G	B	8-bit hex	C	M	Y	K
Black		0	0	0	#000000	0	0	0	100
Matt Gold Foil		192	181	68	#C0B544	18	23	71	8
Pantone Red	032 C	242	0	0	#F20000	5	100	100	0

== Gallery ==
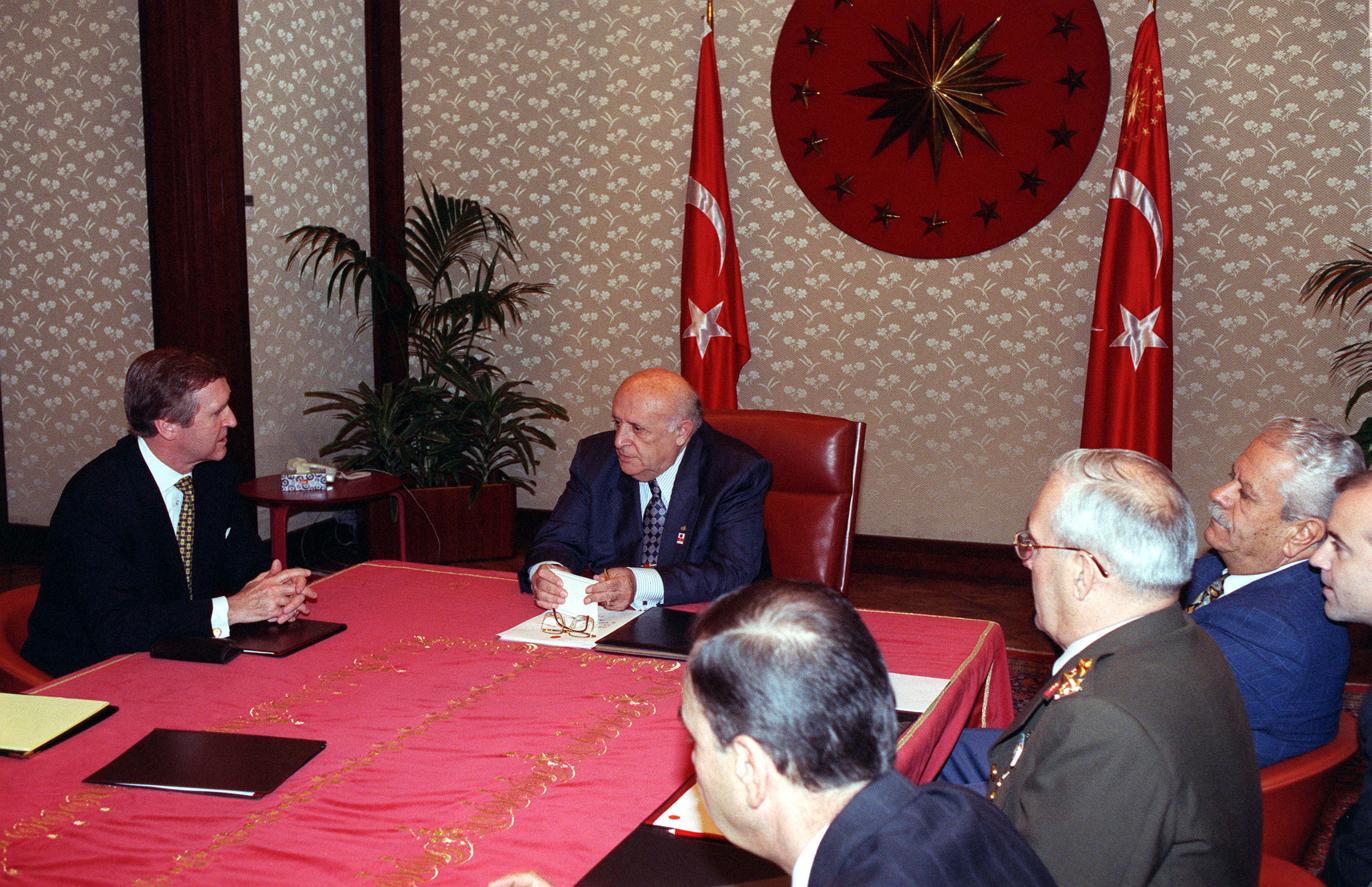
The Presidential emblem behind Demirel (1998)

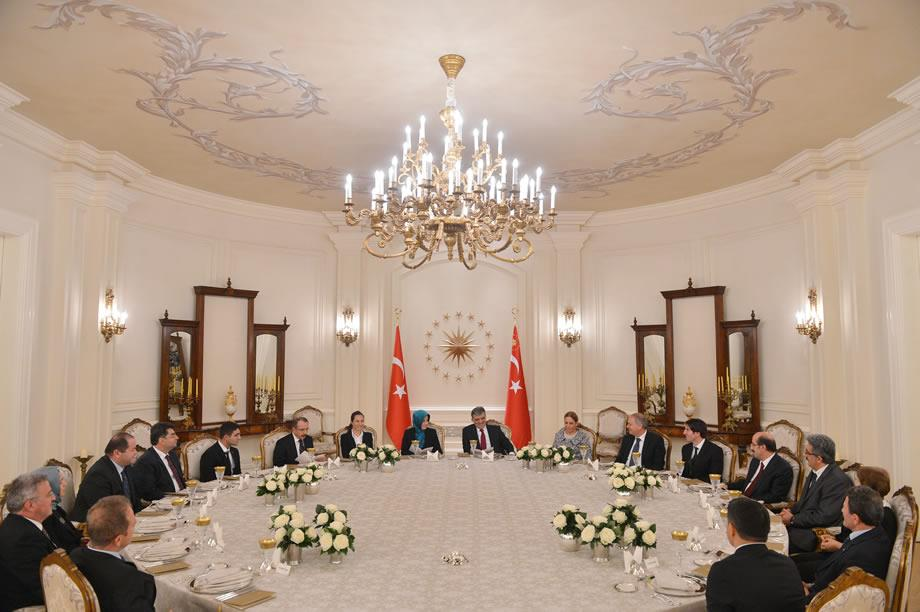
The Presidential emblem behind President Gül (2013)

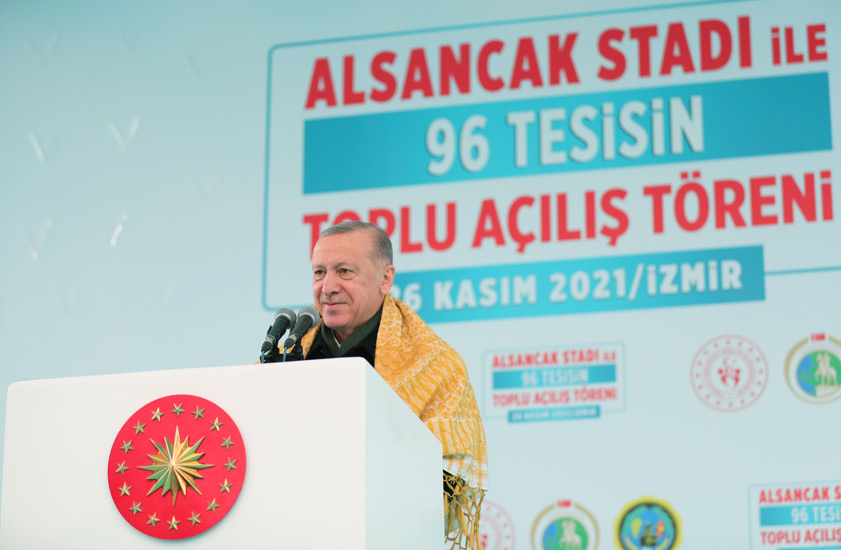
The Presidential emblem attached to a lectern in front of President Erdoğan (2021)

== See also ==
- Emblems of Turkey
- Flag of Turkey
- Presidential Complex, the official residence of the president of Turkey

== External website ==
- "Cumhurbaşkanlığı Armasının Kullanımına İlişkin Usul ve Esaslar" [Procedures and Principles Regarding the Use of the Presidential Coat of Arms] (PDF). tccb.gov.tr (in Turkish). 2020-06-09.
