= Meiktila War Cemetery =

War cemetery in Myanmar for dead Ottoman prisoners of war

- Interactive map of Meiktila War Cemetery

Details
- Location: Meiktila, Mandalay Division
- Country: Burma
- Coordinates: 20.883°N 95.883°E
- Type: war cemetery

The Meiktila War Cemetery is a war cemetery which serves as the resting place for captured Ottoman soldiers who died in Myanmar. It is located in the city of Meiktila, situated in the Meiktila District of the Mandalay Division. The cemetery also serves as a memorial for the deceased soldiers.

During the First World War, approximately 12,000 Ottoman soldiers were captured by the British during the Mesopotamian and Sinai and Palestine campaigns as part of the Middle Eastern theatre of World War I. These prisoners of war were mostly transferred to prisoner-of-war camps in Myanmar, which was under British colonial rule at the time. Up to 1,000 Ottoman prisoners of war died while in captivity, primarily due to outbreaks of disease.

During the war, the prisoner-of-war camp in Meiktila housed thousands of Ottoman prisoners of war. According to a Red Cross report published in 1917, the prisoners reported that they were treated well in the camps but complained about being separated from their families, loss of their liberty and livelihoods and boredom. The Red Cross characterized the prisoners' acceptance of their fate as "Oriental fatalism".

After the end of the First World War, most of the prisoners of war were sent back home. The cemetery in Meiktila where the soldiers were buried soon fell into disrepair, though in 2012 the Turkish government paid for it to be restored in order to serve as a memorial (after Turkish-Myanmar relations began to improve under the presidency of Thein Sein. In 2013, Islamophobic rumors spread in the Mandalay region that after the cemetery was restored, a mosque would be constructed nearby, which were denied by a local Muslim community leader.

According to Frontier Myanmar journalist James T. Davies,

... the rumours about the cemetery [in Meiktila] were due to a misunderstanding. This had exacerbated tension in the town between Buddhists and Muslims, which was already strained by the violence in Rakhine State.

== See also ==
- Thayet War Cemetery
- Turkish military memorials and cemeteries outside Turkey
