= Monument to Turkish soldiers (Ajidere) =

Coordinates: 40.5579°N 48.756°E

- Acıdərə Türk Şəhidliyi (Azerbaijani)
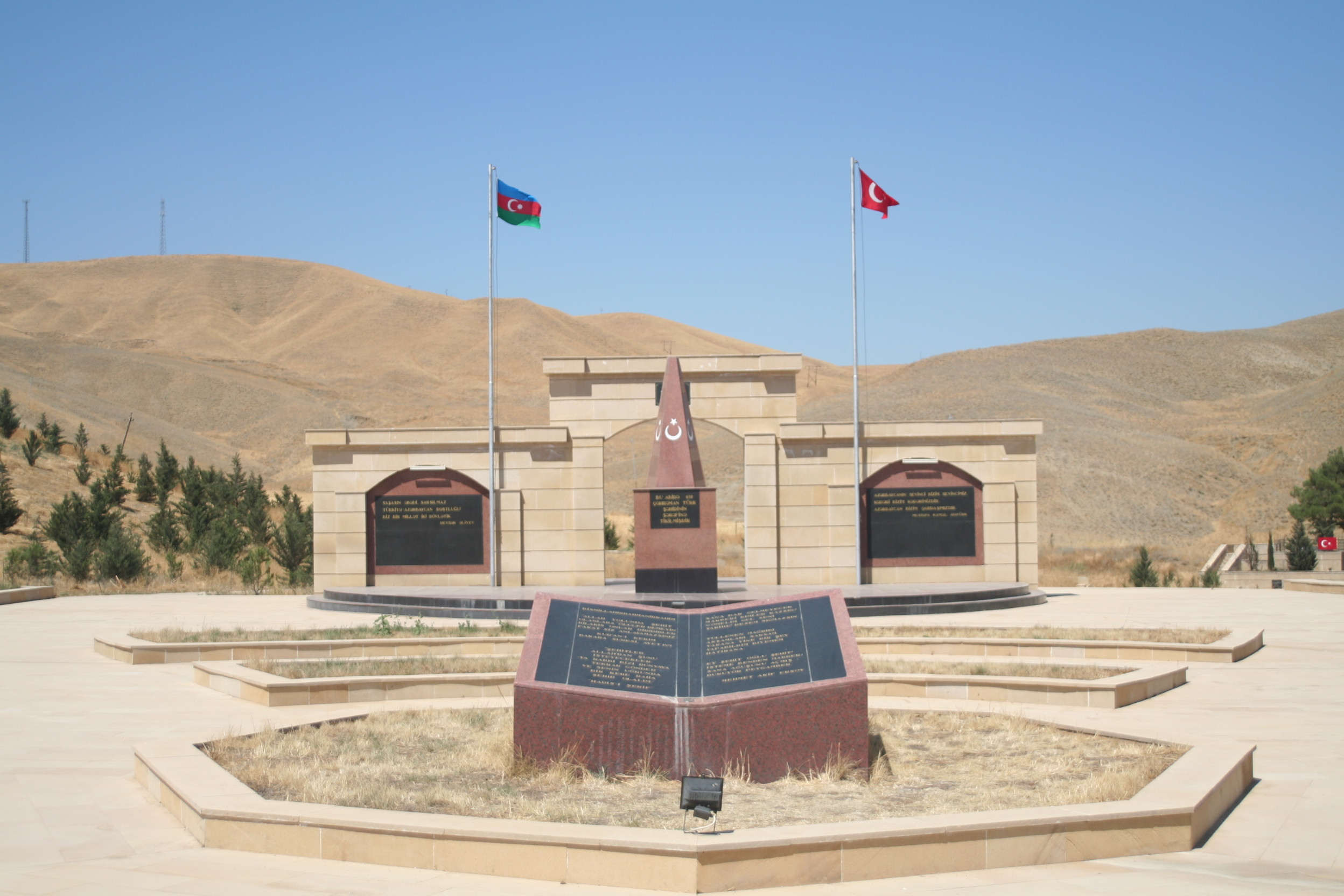

- Location within Azerbaijan
- Location: Gobustan district, Ajidere valley, along the Baku-Shamakhi highway, Azerbaijan

History
- Built: 2000

The Monument to Turkish Soldiers in Ajidere (Azerbaijani: Acıdərə Türk Şəhidliyi) or the Monument to the Unknown Turkish Soldier is a memorial complex located in the Ajidere Valley on the territory of Gobustan district of Azerbaijan to commemorate the fallen soldiers of the Caucasian Islamic Army. At a distance of 250 meters from the monument is the grave of the unknown Turkish soldier of the Caucasian Islamic Army, presumably the officer Kadyr Efendi. The memorial complex was raised in 2000. The authors of the monument are Turkish specialists.

== History ==
On 4 June 1918, the delegation of the Azerbaijan Democratic Republic in Batumi signed an agreement on friendship and cooperation with the Ottoman Empire, according to which the Ottoman Empire was engaged to "provide assistance through armed force to the government of the Azerbaijan Republic, if such is required, to ensure the order and security in the country". On 16 June 1918, the ADR government moved from Tiflis to Ganja, and three days later, the martial law was introduced on the territory of Azerbaijan by a governmental decree. The National Council of Azerbaijan turned to Turkey for military assistance. It involved for this purpose the Caucasian Islamic Army under the commandment of Nuri Pasha, which included the 5th Caucasian and 15th Chanakhgalin Turkish divisions, and the Muslim Corps (since 26 June the Separate Azerbaijani corps), formed by the government of the ADR.

Active hostilities between the Caucasian Islamic Army and parts of the Caucasian Red Army of Baku Council of People Commissars began in early June 1918. In the battles near Goychay on 27 June - 1 July 1918, units of the Caucasian Islamic Army defeated the 1st Caucasian Corps of the Red Army, whose units retreated near Garamaryam. The initiative completely passed to the Caucasian Islamic Army. On 2 July, the Soviet units left Akhsu, on 10 July, after three days of fighting, - Kurdamir, on 14 July - the Kerrar station and continued to retreat along the railway. The length of the front began to grow rapidly, increasing the battered parts of the Baku Red Army. Already in July, the battles were going on in three directions - Shamakhi, Seldis and central - Kurdamir.

On 20 July 1918, in the midst of the battle for Shamakhi, the commander of the Dashnak brigade Hamazasp commanded the retreat, after which Shamakhi was abandoned by the Soviet troops and soon was occupied by units of the Caucasian Islamic Army.

== Monument ==
=== Grave of the Turkish soldier ===
At the distance of 250 meters from the monument there is the grave of the unknown Turkish soldier of the Caucasian Islamic Army, who arrived in Azerbaijan in 1918. Presumably, it belongs to the Turkish officer Kadyr Efendi. The grave was landscaped by Melik Mammad, a resident of the Tekle village of the Shamakhi district, who fill this grave. Above this burial is a tomb chest decorated with a kitabe, on which it is written:

This is the grave of a Turkish son - a hero. Look how he was razed to the ground. This is the grave of a lion who did his military duty. This is the grave of an officer from the Ottoman regimental troops. He arrived to the Caucasus, fought and became a martyr. In 1336, he found the eternal peace.

The grave was again landscaped again in 1964 by Babakhan Gara oglu Rzakhanov, a resident of Baku, originating from Shamakhi. Rzakhanov also raised a metal fence around the grave.

The grave was marked on the map of the General Staff of the USSR in 1985.

In subsequent years, the tomb was repaired by Dr. Bakhtiyar Ismayili's son Attila Ismayili. At the same time, the Turkish flag was hoisted over the grave.

Azerbaijani poets Bakhtiyar Vahabzade ("Lonely Grave") and Gabil Imamverdiyev ("Turk's Grave") dedicated poems to this grave.

=== Creating the complex ===
The grave of the Turkish soldier and its surroundings were once again landscaped in 2000. The initiator of this work was the military attaché of Turkey in Azerbaijan, Brigadier General Sadig Erjan. The landscape design of the grave and the monument to the fallen soldiers of the Caucasian Islamic Army in the nearby square was developed by Turkish specialists. In the course of the works, the surroundings of the grave were strengthened, stones were laid along the edges, and the flags of Azerbaijan and Turkey were raised in front.

In 2010, the memorial complex was again landscaped and opened in June of the same year. At the same time, with the participation of the Turkish Ambassador to Azerbaijan Hulusi Kilic, employees of the Turkish embassy and employees of the Ministry of Ecology and Natural Resources of Azerbaijan, the laying of the Azerbaijani-Turkish park took place. The project of the park was proposed by the Turkish Ambassador to Azerbaijan and approved by the government of Azerbaijan.

=== Description of the complex ===
The memorial to the fallen Turkish soldiers is located 250 meters from the grave. It was built in accordance with the traditions of Seljuk architecture. The base of the monument is a granite stone on a platform measuring 1.20x1.20 meters and 2.5 meters high. On the front side of the monument, an image of a star and a crescent is engraved in white and the inscription "This monument was built in the honor of 1130 heroic Turkish martyrs" (Azerbaijani: Bu abidə 1130 qəhrəman türk şəhidinin şərəfinə tikilmişdir) is placed.

The length of the site of the memorial complex, which occupies an area of 74.24 square meters, is 11.6 m, and the width is 6.4 m. An asphalt platform of 350 square meters has been created in front of the monument, as well as parking. Trees have been planted around the complex, and in 2000 it was planned to set up a 15-hectare park. In 2010, a park was laid around the monument.

At the entrance on the territory of the complex there is a stone obelisk, on which is attached a tablet with Bakhtiyar Vahabzade's poem "Lonely Grave". In front of the monument there is a monument in the form of an open book, on the right page of which quotes from Koran are written, and on the right page, there is a poem by the Turkish poet Mehmet Akif Ersoy written. Behind the monument is a wall with an arch, on which quotes from Heydar Aliyev and Mustafa Kemal Atatürk are written.
