= Sanaa Turkish Memorial Cemetery =

Cemetery in Sanaa, Yemen

The Sana'a Turkish Memorial Cemetery (Turkish: Yemen-Türk Şehitliği) is a burial ground of Ottoman soldiers in Sanaa, Yemen.

Inaugurated in 2011 after renovation, the Turkish Memorial Cemetery holds remains of soldiers, who fell during World War I, and commemorates the four-centuries-long presence of Ottoman Empire in Yemen. It is situated next to the former Ottoman Army barracks in the Yemeni capital city, today General Staff headquarters of the Yemen Armed Forces. Turkish high officials visiting Yemen pay tribute at the cemetery.

== See also ==
- Yemen Eyalet (1517–1872)
- Yemen Vilayet (1872–1918)
- Arab Revolt (1916–1918)
