= Mosque of the Martyrs =

Mosque in Baku, Azerbaijan

Mosque of the Martyrs (Shahid's Mosque)
- Şəhidlər Məscidi
- The mosque in 2009

- Location of the mosque in Baku

Religion
- Affiliation: Sunni Islam
- Ecclesiastical or organizational status: Mosque
- Leadership: Imam Ilgar Ibrahimoglu
- Status: Active

Location
- Location: Martyrs' Lane, Baku
- Country: Azerbaijan
- Interactive map of Mosque of the Martyrs (Shahid's Mosque)
- Coordinates: 40°21′31″N 49°49′40″E

Architecture
- Type: Mosque architecture
- Style: Ottoman
- Groundbreaking: c. 1990
- Completed: 1996

Specifications
- Dome: Two
- Minaret: Two
- Materials: Stone

The Mosque of the Martyrs or Martyrs' Mosque (Azerbaijani: Şəhidlər Məscidi), officially the Alley of Martyrs' Mosque, also known as the Turkish Mosque and Shahid's Mosque (Azerbaijani: Şəhidlər Məscidi), is a Sunni Islam mosque, located near the Martyrs' Lane (also known as Alley of Martyrs), in the Upland Park district of Baku, the capital of Azerbaijan.

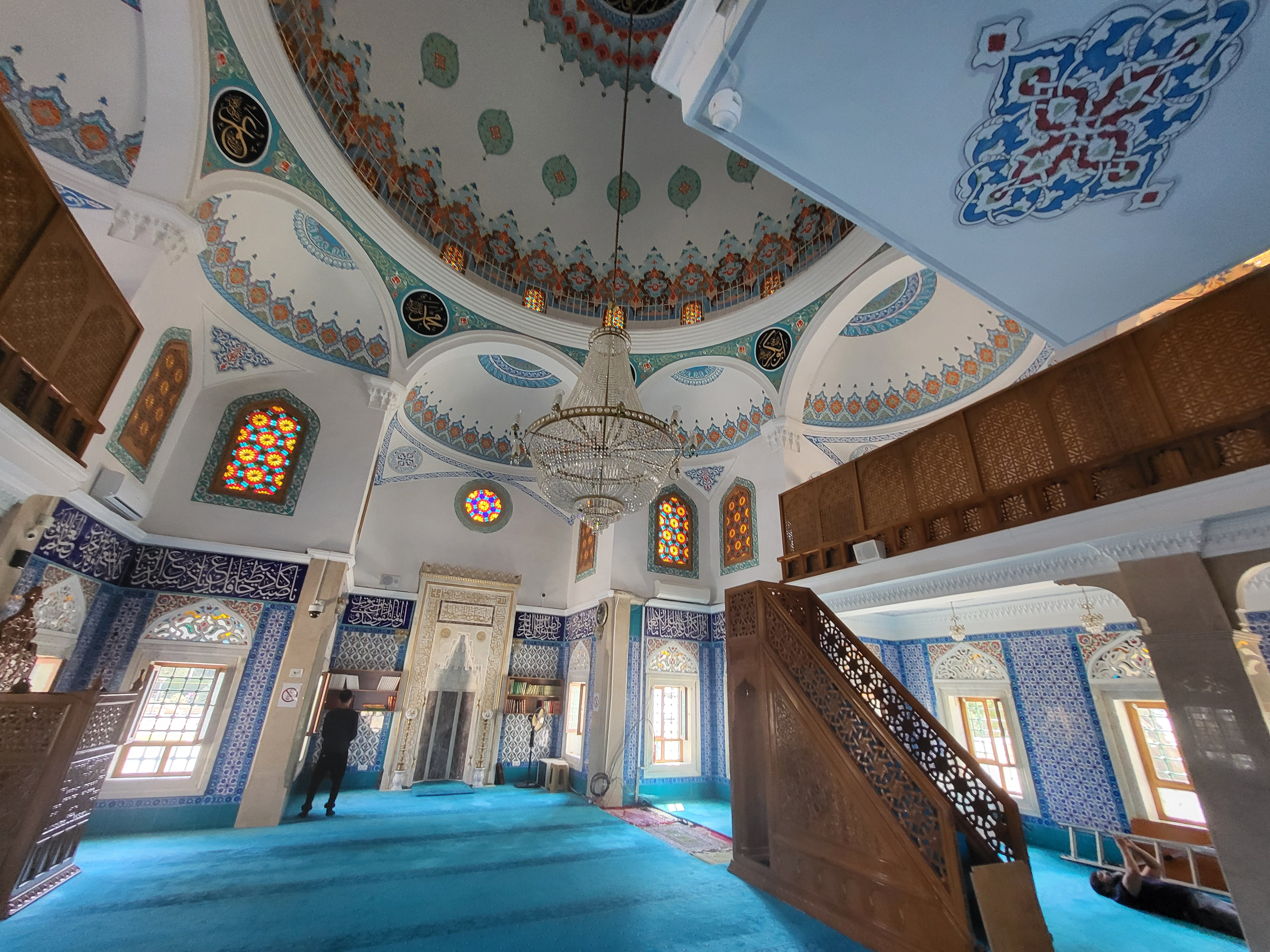
Inside of the mosque

== Overview ==
Construction of the mosque commenced at the beginning of the 1990s with the assistance of the Turkish government and was completed in 1996. Repairs were completed on the mosque in 2007 and the mosque closed for further repairs in 2009. The closure was attributed by some to disagreements between the Azerbaijani and Turkish governments regarding Armenia.

As of December 2012, the mosque was used as an official residence of religious attaché of the Turkish embassy. In 2017 the President of Turkey, Abdullah Gül, visited the mosque.

The 154th ayah from Al-Baqara chapter of Quran is written on the façade of the mosque in Arabic and Turkish, and translated into English, reads:

"Do not say "Dead!" about those, who died for the sake of Allah. No, they are alive! But you do not feel."

== See also ==
- Islam in Azerbaijan
- List of mosques in Azerbaijan
- List of mosques in Baku
