= 16 Great Turkic Empires =

Concept in Turkish ethnic nationalism

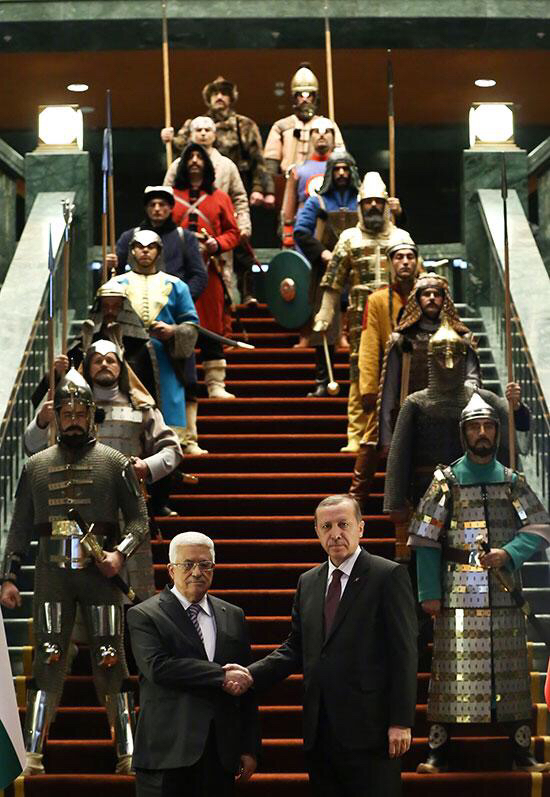
Erdoğan and Mahmoud Abbas with actors representing the 16 Great Turkic Empires (2015)

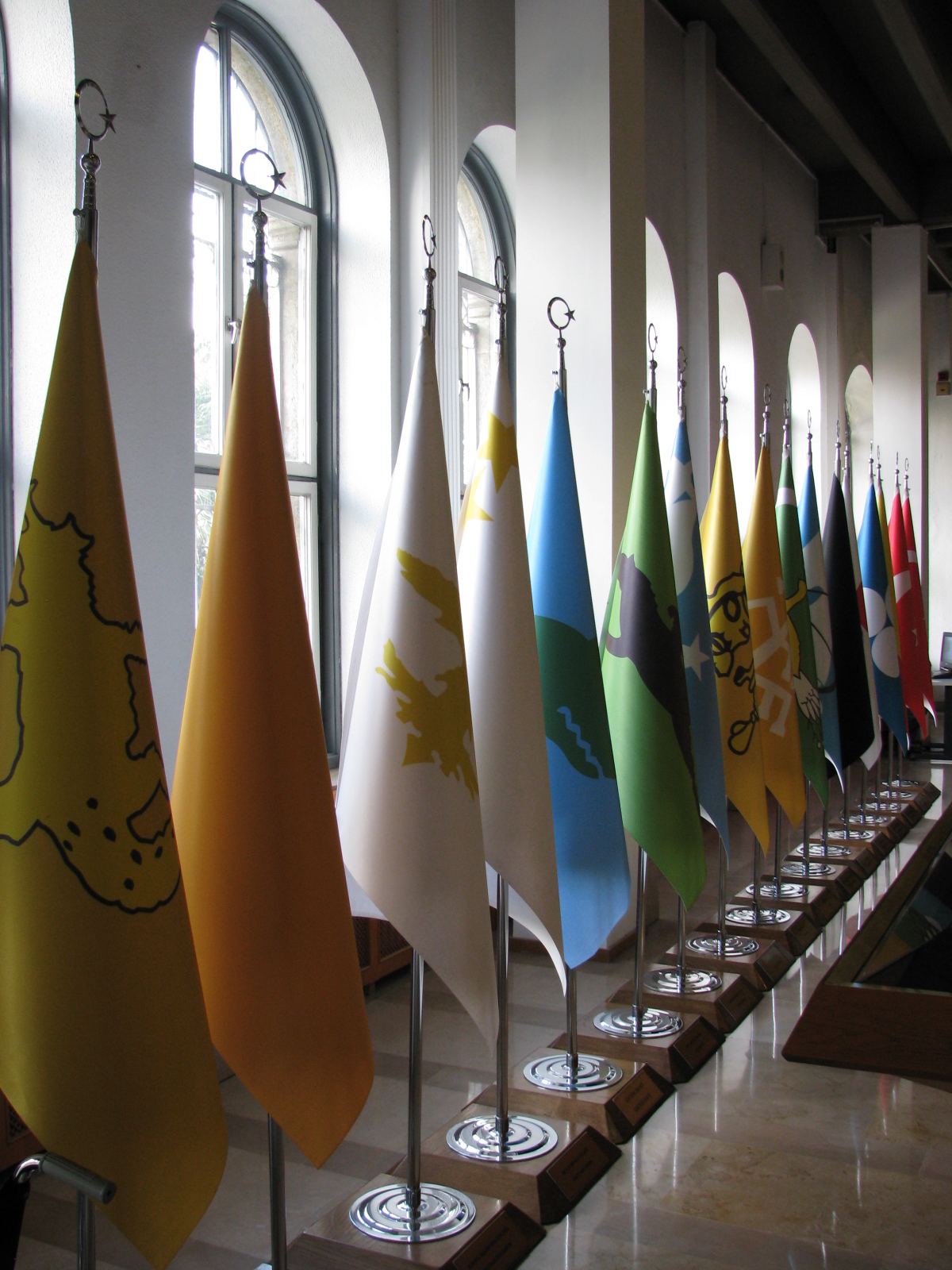
Flags of the 16 Great Turkish Empires displayed in the Istanbul Military Museum

The 16 Great Turkic Empires (Turkish: 16 Büyük Türk Devleti, lit. 'Sixteen Great Turkic States') is a concept in Turkish nationalism introduced in 1969 by map officer Akib Özbek and widely invoked by Turkish authorities during the 1980s, under the government of Kenan Evren.

== The list ==
The "16 Great Turkic Empires" are the following (according to the Turkish Presidency):

| Flag (attributed by Özbek) | Name | Turkish name | Founder | Dates (Gregorian) (as listed on the Presidency of the Republic of Turkey's Website) |
|---|---|---|---|---|
| | "Great Hunnic Empire" | Büyük Hun İmparatorluğu | Modu Chanyu | 220 BCE – 216 CE |
| | "Western Hunnic Empire" | Batı Hun İmparatorluğu | Panu | 48–216 |
| | "Europe Hunnic Empire" | Avrupa Hun İmparatorluğu | Attila | 375–469 |
| | "White Hunnic Empire" | Ak Hun İmparatorluğu | Aksunvar | 420–552 |
| | "Göktürk Empire" | Göktürk İmparatorluğu | Bumin Qaghan | 552–745 |
| | "Avar Empire" | Avar İmparatorluğu | Bayan Qaghan | 565–835 |
| | "Khazar Empire" | Hazar İmparatorluğu | Irbis | 651–983 |
| | "Uyghur State" | Uygur Devleti | Kutlug I Bilge Khagan | 745–1368 |
| | Karakhanids | Karahanlılar | Bilge Kul Qadir Khan | 840–1212 |
| | "Ghaznavid Empire" | Gazneliler | Sabuktigin | 962–1183 |
| | "Seljuk Empire" | Büyük Selçuklu İmparatorluğu | Tughril | 1040–1157 |
| | "Khwarazmian Empire" | Harzemşahlar | Muhammad II of Khwarezm | 1097–1231 |
| | "Golden Horde State" | Altınordu Devleti | Batu Khan | 1236–1502 |
| | "Great Timurid Empire" | Büyük Timur İmparatorluğu | Timur | 1368–1501 |
| | "Mughal Empire" | Babür İmparatorluğu | Babur | 1526–1858 |
| | "Ottoman Empire" | Osmanlı İmparatorluğu | Osman I | 1299–1922 |

== Reception ==
16 stars in the Presidential Seal of Turkey represents each empire. (Note: Although this view was first time proposed in 1969)

Turkish nationalist writer, novelist, poet and philosopher, Hüseyin Nihâl Atsız, supporter of the pan-Turkist or Turanism ideology, had noted that while some states with questionable Turkic identity were included in the list (like the Hephthalite Empire), some ostensibly Turkic states (such as Aq Qoyunlu) were left out, and labeled the list a "fabrication."

In spite of Atsız' criticism, the concept was made a mainstream topos in Turkish national symbolism in the wake of the 1980 Turkish coup d'état, under the presidency of Kenan Evren. The Turkish Postal administration issued a series of stamps dedicated to the 16 Empires in 1984, showing portraits of their respective founders as well as attributed flags. In 1985, Özbek's 16 Empires were invoked as a retrospective explanation of the 16 stars in the presidential seal of Turkey (introduced in 1936).

Several municipal buildings and public parks in Turkey have collections of busts or statues of the founders of the "16 Empires" alongside a statue of Kemal Atatürk, including the municipal buildings of Keçiören (Ankara), Mamak, Ankara, Etimesgut, Niğde, Nevşehir and Pınarbaşı, Kayseri.

In 2000, Türk Telekom produced a series of smart cards dedicated to the topic.

In January 2015, Turkish president Recep Tayyip Erdoğan received Palestinian president Mahmoud Abbas in the Turkish Presidential Palace with a guard of 16 "warriors", actors wearing loosely historical armour and costume, intended to symbolise the 16 empires. The costumes were ridiculed in Turkish media outlets, and one of the costumes in particular was mocked as a "bathrobe", becoming a trend on social media under the name of Duşakabinoğulları (lit. "sons of the shower cabin").

In December 2025, when Turkish foreign minister Hakan Fidan met his Syrian counterpart Asaad al-Shaibani in the People's Palace, different flags were presented symbolizing different civilizations and Islamic states which have existed on Syrian ground.

== See also ==
- Division of the Mongol Empire
- List of Mongol states
- Neo-Ottomanism
- Organization of Turkic States
- Pan-Turkism
- Tartary
- Turanism
- Turco-Mongol tradition
- Turco-Persian tradition
- Turkic history
- Turkic peoples
- Turkification
- Turkish nationalism
