= Flag of Turkey =

- Ay Yıldız ("moon star"), Al Bayrak ("red flag")
- Use: National flag and ensign
- Proportion: 2:3
- Adopted: 1844 (Ottoman flag); 29 May 1936 (standardized)
- Design: A red field charged with a white crescent and star slightly left-of-center.

The national flag of Turkey, officially the Turkish flag (Turkish: Türk bayrağı), features a white crescent and star in a red background on its emblem, based on the 18th-century flag of the Ottoman Empire. The flag is often called "the red flag" (al bayrak), and is referred to as "the red banner" (al sancak) in the Turkish national anthem. The measures, geometric proportions, and exact tone of red of the flag of Turkey were legally standardized with the Turkish Flag Law on 29 May 1936.

== History ==
The star and crescent flag of the Ottoman Empire, a late 18th-century design officially adopted in 1844

The star and crescent design appears on Ottoman flags beginning in the late 18th or early 19th century. The white star and crescent moon on red as the flag of the Ottoman Empire were introduced in 1844.

After the declaration of the Republic of Turkey in 1923, the new administrative regime maintained the last flag of the Ottoman Empire. Proportional standardizations were introduced in the Turkish Flag Law of 1936.

== Legal basis ==
Fundamentals of the Turkish flag were laid down by Turkish Flag Law No. 2994 on 29 May 1936 during the Republic period of Turkey. Turkish Flag Regulation No. 2/7175 dated 28 July 1937, and Supplementary Regulation No. 11604/2 dated 29 July 1939, were enacted to describe how the flag law would be implemented. The Turkish Flag Law No. 2893 dated 22 September 1983, and Published in the Official Gazette on 24 September 1983, was promulgated six months after its publication. According to Article 9 of Law No. 2893, a statute including the fundamentals of the implementation was also published.

=== Usage in the Republic of Cyprus ===
According to the Constitution of Cyprus, the community authorities and their institutions have the right to hoist the Turkish flag (as well as the Greek flag) alongside the flag of Cyprus during the holidays. Any citizen may, without any restriction, fly the Greek or Turkish flag, or both, next to the flag of Cyprus.

== Construction ==
=== Dimensions ===
The specification below, given by Turkish Flag Law, implies that the distance between (the left edge of) the inner circle of the crescent and a vertical line connecting the two pointed ends of the crescent is 279/800 G = 0.34875 G; thus, the left point of the star intrudes about 0.0154 G beyond that line.

Construction sheet

| Letter | Measure | Length |
|---|---|---|
| G | Width | |
| A | Distance between the centre of the outer crescent and the seam of the white band | 1/2 G |
| B | Diameter of the circle around the star | 1/4 G |
| C | Distance between the centres of the inner and outer circles of the crescent | 1/16 G |
| D | Diameter of the inner circle of the crescent | 2/5 G |
| E | Distance between the inner circle of the crescent and the circle around the star | 1/3 G |
| F | Diameter of the outer circle of the crescent | 1/2 G |
| L | Length | 1 1/2 G |
| M | Width of the white hem at the hoist | 1/30 G |

== Display and use ==
The Turkish Flag in vertical format

The National Cockade of Turkey

=== State institutions ===
The flag is always displayed prominently in state institutions from schools to ministries. The Beştepe Presidential Complex, Parliament, ministries, schools, military, councils, governors buildings, muhtar's offices, bridges, airports, and every state owned building in the country features one or more flags of Turkey.

=== Uniforms ===
On military uniforms the flag is displayed on a patch either on the right shoulder or on the front of the uniform. Helmets can display the flag too on the front or the sides. Flight suits, navy uniforms, Jandarma uniforms and others feature the flag on shoulder patches or helmets. Along with uniforms several emblems and patches display the flag with prominence or minor alteration.

=== Days of display ===
Turkey celebrates many national events such as battle victories and Republic Day. People come to the streets with their flags to celebrate such days. On other occasions the public uses the flag heavily when protesting or commemorating certain events or deaths respectively. Statues and monuments may be draped with the flag while marches and songs are played. On television screens the flag is displayed in celebration of such events too with the portrait of Atatürk next to it. The flag may also be presented at half staff in mourning of tragic events or important days.

=== Funerals ===
The flag has a prominent display on state and military funerals. A burial flag is always draped over the deceased coffin and is carried by the military police or relatives of the deceased. Soldiers of all types and the Presidential Guard also carry the coffin at times. Many attendees also feature the flag on their lapels along with an image of the deceased.

== Gallery ==
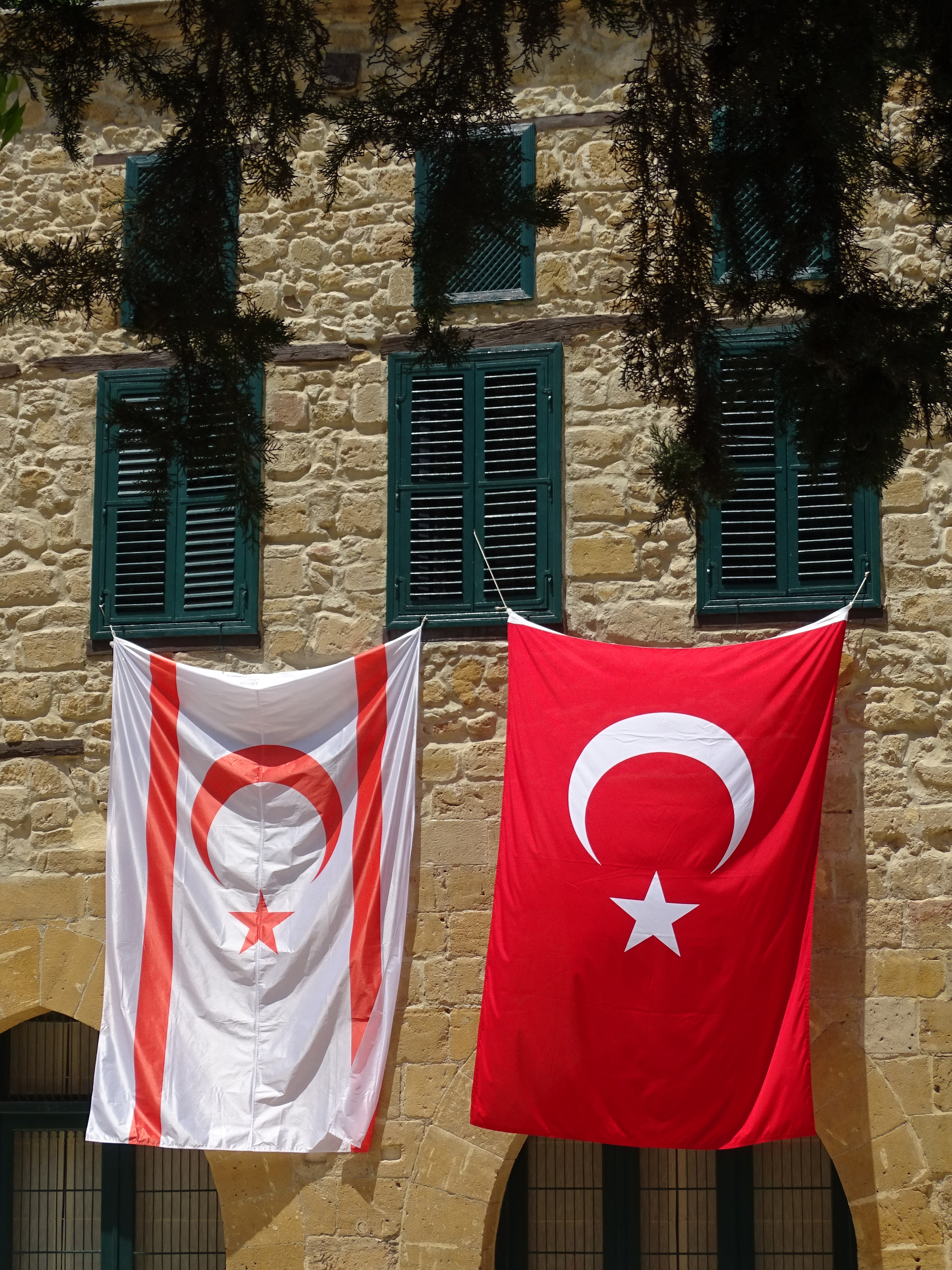
Flag of Turkey and Northern Cyprus

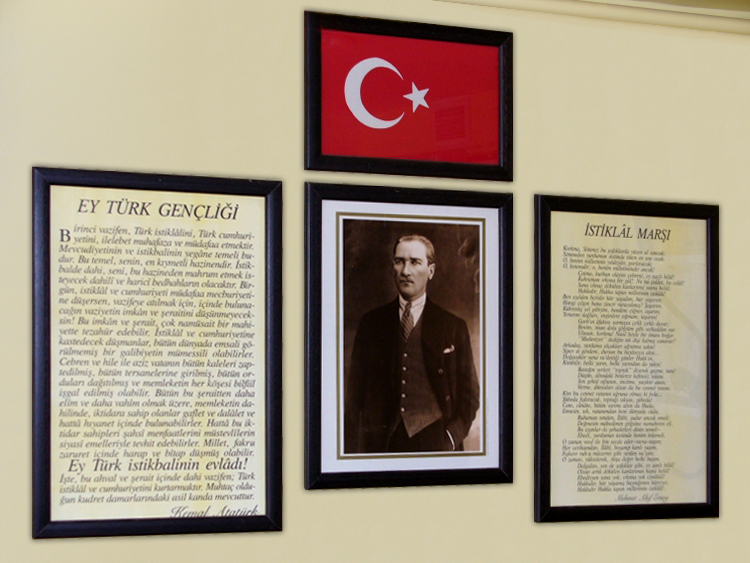
The flag is prominently displayed in classrooms and any and all state institutions.

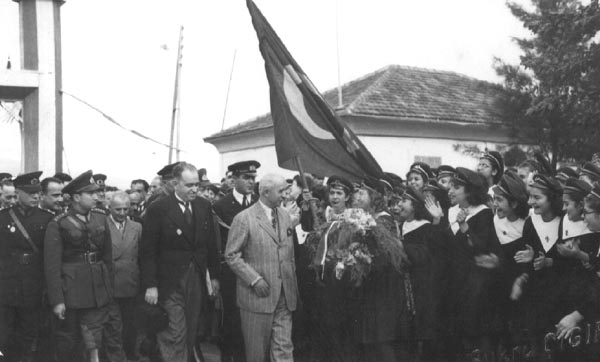
The Turkish flag brought upon the annexation of Hatay

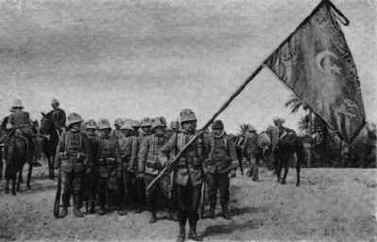
Turkish flag captured by Italian Forces in 1911 (Italo-Turkish War, Libya)

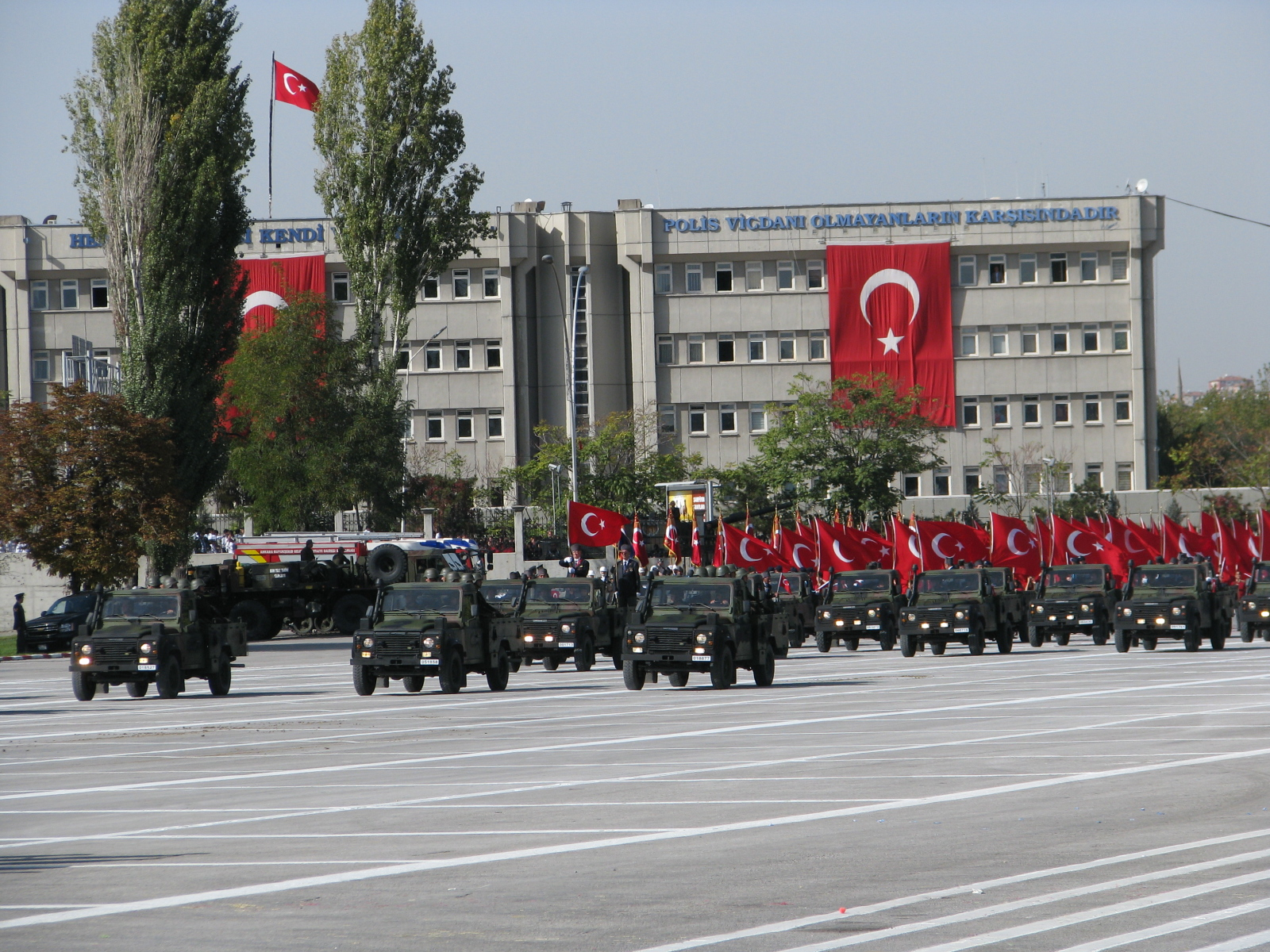
Celebration of Republic Day

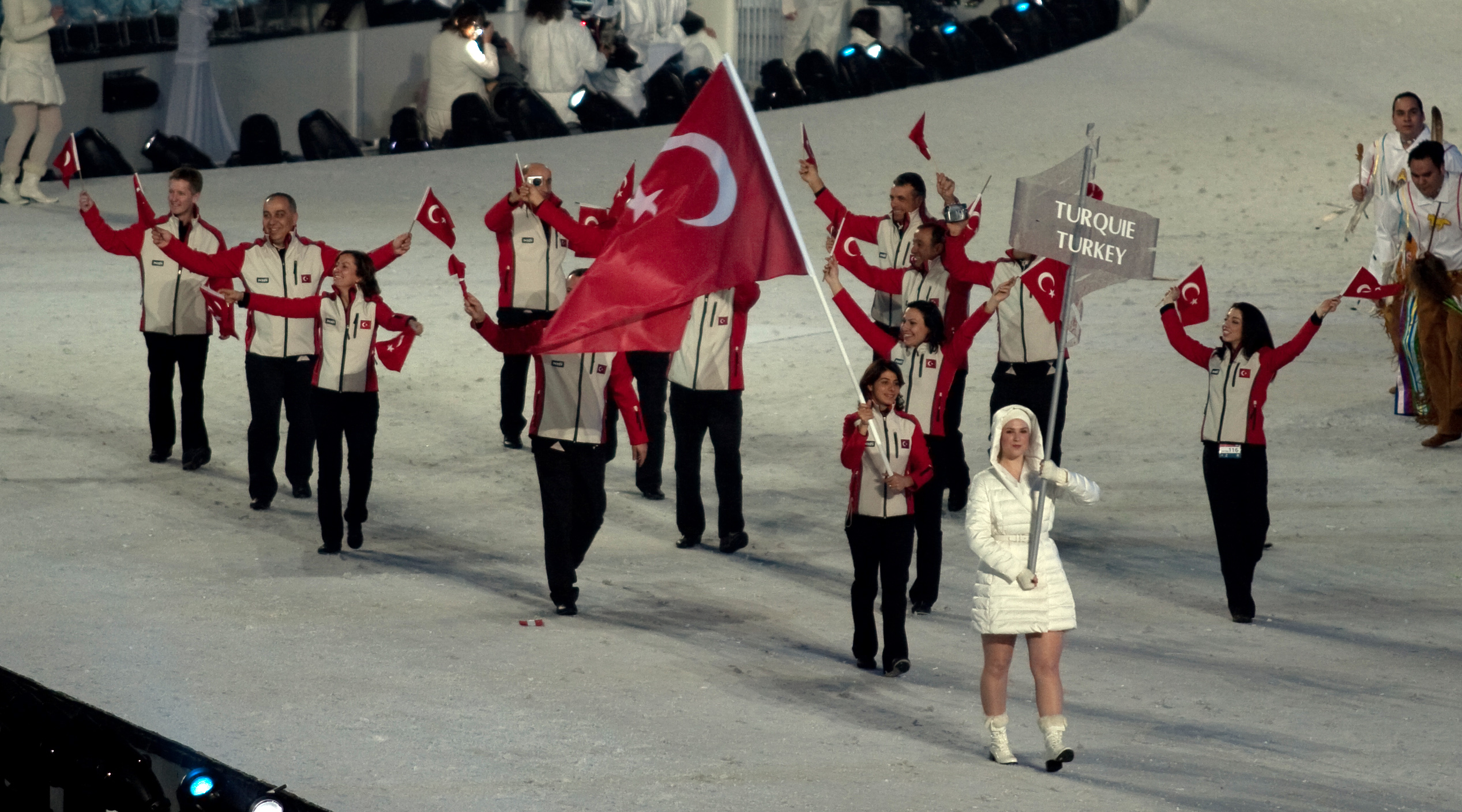
Opening ceremony of the 2010 Winter Olympics

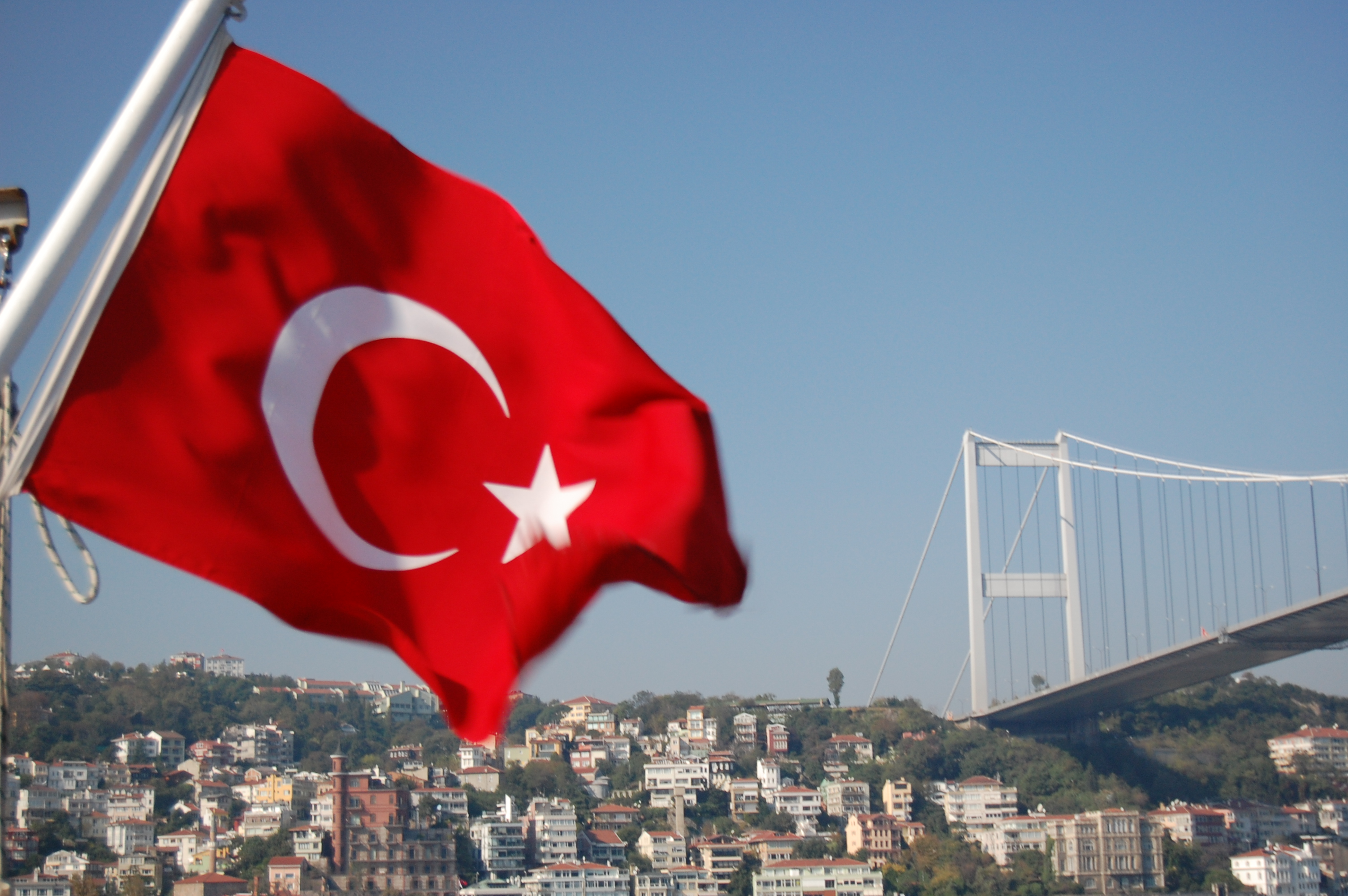
Turkish flag by the 15 July Martyrs Bridge

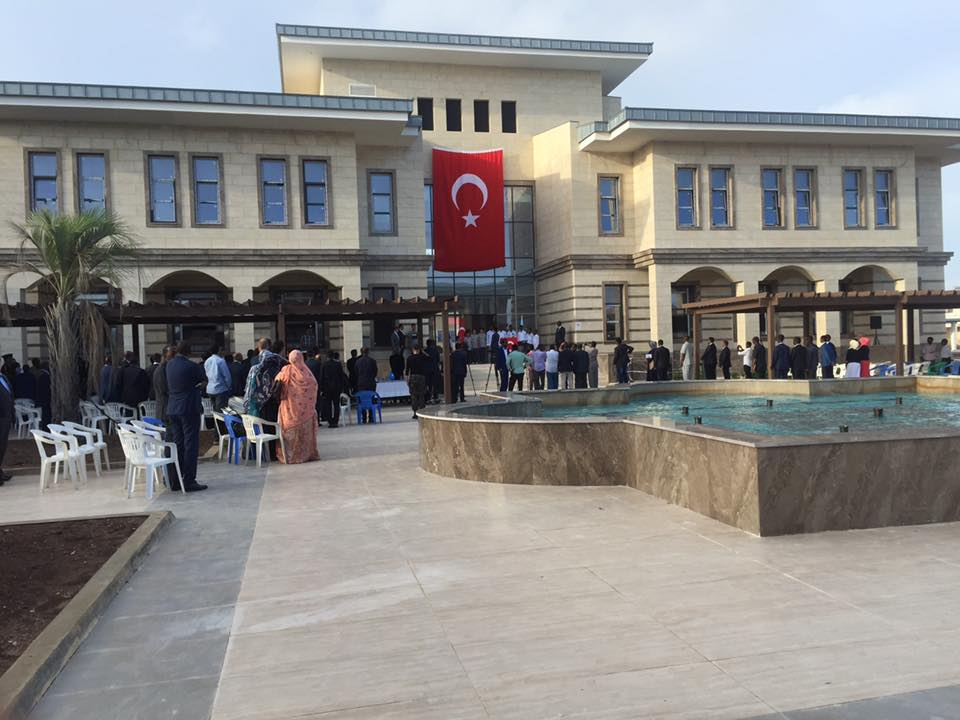
The Turkish Embassy in Somalia

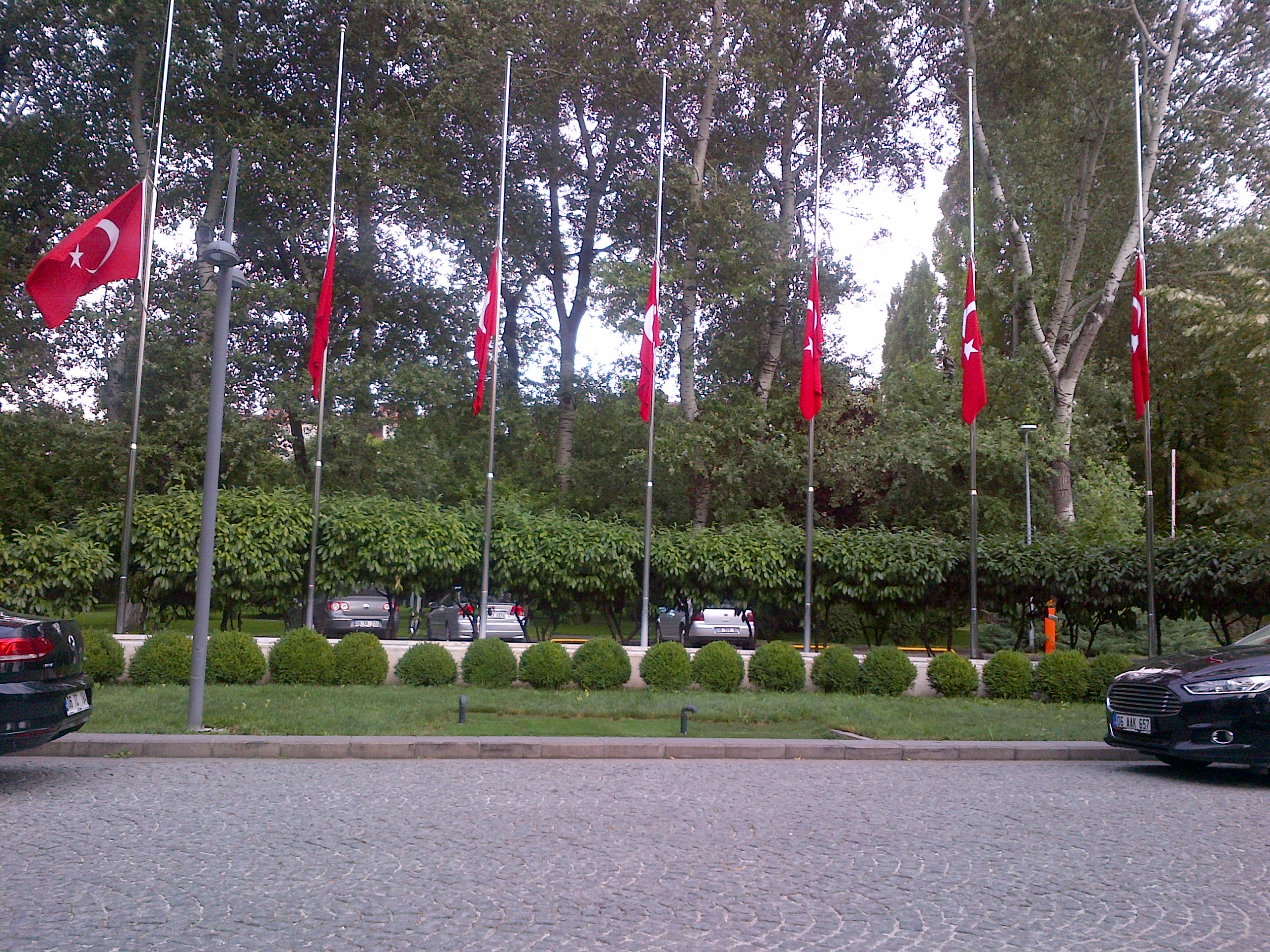
Turkish flags at half mast, commemorating the 2016 Atatürk Airport attack

Flag of Hatay State

== See also ==
- Presidential standard of Turkey
- Emblems of Turkey
- List of Turkish flags
- List of national flags of sovereign states
- Lists of flags
- Riau-Lingga Sultanate
