= Davutoğlu Cabinet =

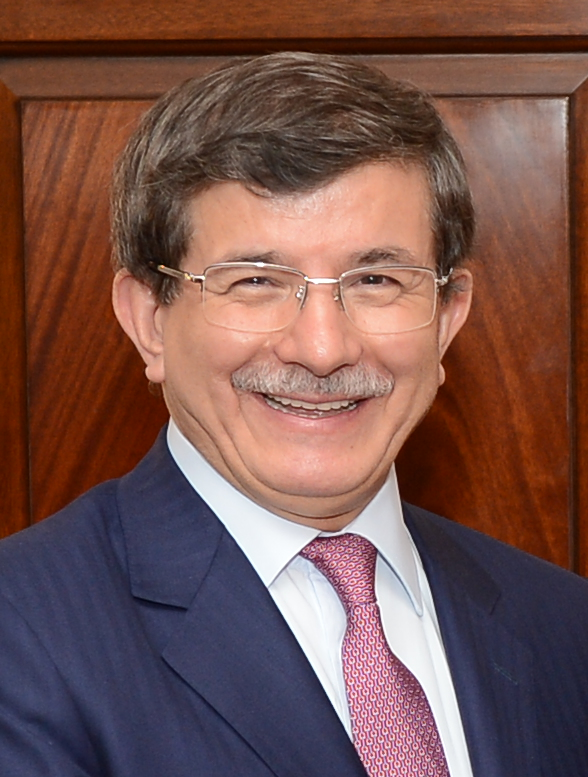

The Davutoğlu Cabinet can refer to three different governments of Turkey, which were formed and led by Prime Minister Ahmet Davutoğlu.

- First Davutoğlu Cabinet (29 August 2014 – 28 August 2015)
- 2015 interim election government of Turkey (28 August 2015 – 17 November 2015)
- Third Davutoğlu Cabinet (24 November 2015 – Incumbent)
