= Nurettin Canikli =

Turkish civil servant (born 1960)

Nurettin Canikli MP
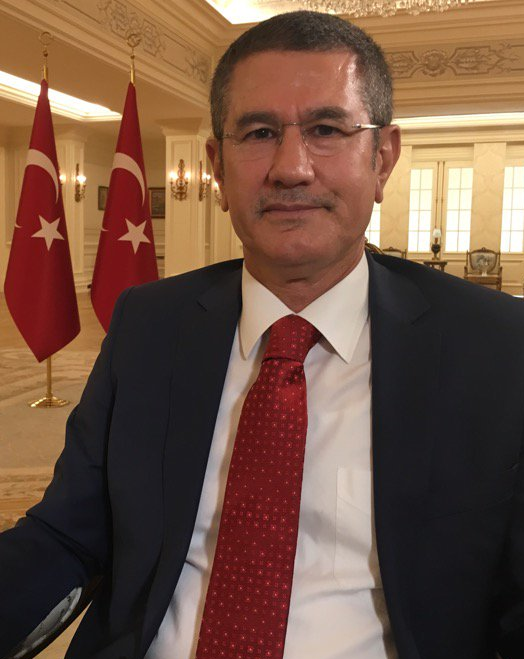
- Canikli in 2016

Minister of National Defense
- In office 19 July 2017 – 10 July 2018
- Prime Minister: Binali Yıldırım
- Preceded by: Fikri Işık
- Succeeded by: Hulusi Akar

Deputy Prime Minister of Turkey
- In office 24 May 2016 – 19 July 2017
- Prime Minister: Binali Yıldırım
- Serving with: Mehmet Şimşek; Numan Kurtulmuş; Tuğrul Türkeş; Veysi Kaynak
- Preceded by: Yalçın Akdoğan
- Succeeded by: Recep Akdağ

Minister of Customs and Trade
- In office 29 August 2014 – 28 August 2015
- Prime Minister: Ahmet Davutoğlu
- Preceded by: Hayati Yazıcı
- Succeeded by: Cenap Aşçı

Member of the Grand National Assembly
- Incumbent
- Assumed office 1 November 2015
- Constituency: Giresun (Nov 2015); Istanbul (I) (2018)
- In office 3 November 2002 – 7 June 2015
- Constituency: Giresun (2002, 2007, 2011)

Personal details
- Born: 15 May 1960 (age 66) Alucra, Giresun Province, Turkey
- Children: 4
- Education: Ankara University; University of Sheffield
- Occupation: Politician, civil servant
- Cabinet: 62nd, 65th, 66th

Nurettin Canikli (born 15 May 1960) is a Turkish politician, the former Minister of National Defense of Turkey and a Member of Parliament for Giresun under the ruling Justice and Development Party. He previously also served as the Deputy Prime Minister of Turkey and the Minister of Customs and Trade of Turkey.

== Early life and career ==
After finishing the İmam Hatip school in Giresun, Canikli studied Economics at Ankara University graduating with a Bachelors's degree. Canikli obtained a Master's degree in Finance from University of Sheffield in the United Kingdom.

Canikli worked in various positions in the Ministry of Finance. and also worked as a columnist on a daily basis at the Turkish daily newspaper Yeni Şafak between 1997 and 2002.

== Justice and Development Party ==
Canikli is a member of the founders’ council of the Justice and Development Party and was elected as Member of Parliament for the Giresun province at the Turkish general election on 3 November 2002. He served as the MP of Giresun province during the 22nd, 23rd and 24th terms. In the 2007 and 2011 elections, he secured his seat in the Grand National Assembly of Turkey (TBMM). On 29 August 2014 he was appointed Minister of Customs and Trade in the Cabinet of Ahmet Davutoğlu.

== Personal life ==
Canikli is married and father of four children. He also speaks English.

Political offices
Preceded by Hayati Yazıcı	Minister of Customs and Trade; 29 August 2014 – 28 August 2015	Succeeded by Cenap Aşçı
Preceded by Fikri Işık	Minister of National Defence; 19 July 2017 – 10 July 2018	Succeeded by Hulusi Akar
