= Fikri Işık =

Turkish politician (born 1965)

Fikri Işık MP
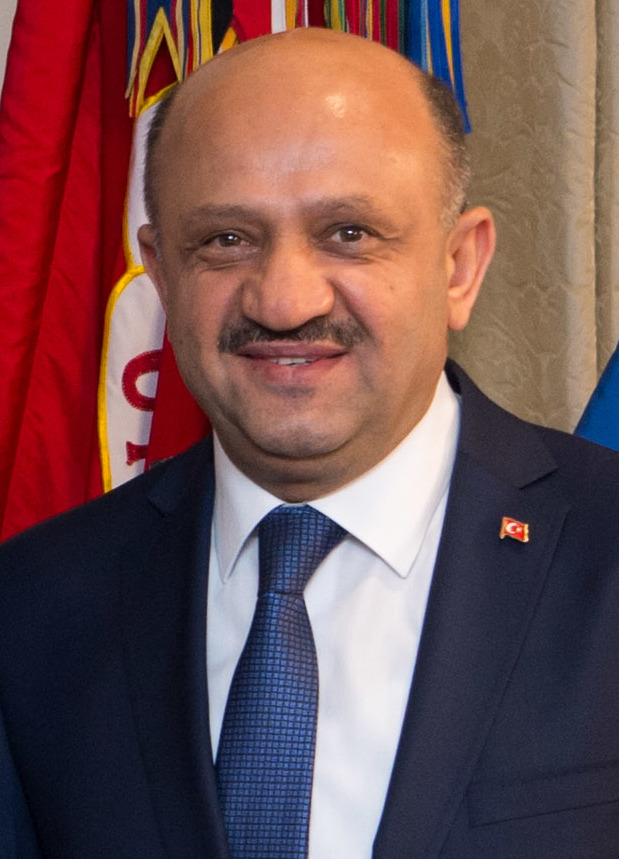
- Işık in April 2017

Deputy Prime Minister of Turkey
- In office 19 July 2017 – 9 July 2018
- Prime Minister: Binali Yıldırım
- Serving with: Mehmet Şimşek; Bekir Bozdağ; Hakan Çavuşoğlu; Recep Akdağ
- Preceded by: Veysi Kaynak
- Succeeded by: office abolished

Minister of National Defense
- In office 24 May 2016 – 19 July 2017
- President: Recep Tayyip Erdoğan
- Prime Minister: Binali Yıldırım
- Preceded by: İsmet Yılmaz
- Succeeded by: Nurettin Canikli

Minister of Science, Industry and Technology
- In office 25 December 2013 – 24 May 2016
- Prime Minister: Recep Tayyip Erdoğan; Ahmet Davutoğlu
- Preceded by: Nihat Ergün

Member of the Grand National Assembly
- In office 22 July 2007 – 7 April 2023
- Constituency: Kocaeli (2007, 2011, June 2015, Nov 2015, 2018)

Personal details
- Born: 13 September 1965 (age 61) Babacan, Şiran, Gümüşhane, Turkey
- Party: Justice and Development Party (AKP)
- Spouse: Nigar Işık
- Children: 4
- Education: Middle East Technical University (BS)
- Profession: Politician; educator
- Cabinet: 61st, 62nd, 63rd, 64th, 65th

Fikri Işık MP (born 13 September 1965) is a Turkish politician who served as the last Deputy Prime Minister of Turkey from 2017 to 2018. Previously, he served as Minister of Science, Industry and Technology from 2013 to 2016 and Minister of National Defense from 2016 to 2017. He is a Member of Parliament representing the Kocaeli Province on behalf of the ruling Justice and Development Party (AKP), from 2007 to 2023. Before politics, Işık was an educator.

== Early life ==
Fikri Işık was born on 13 September 1965 to Tevfik and Mecbure Işık in the village of Babacan in Şiran district of Gümüşhane Province, Turkey. He studied Mathematics Education at the Middle East Technical University in Ankara.

== Career ==
=== Profession ===
Işık worked as a mathematics and English language teacher in private schools at İzmit and Istanbul. He served also as manager in the food industry.

=== Politics ===
Fikri Işık entered politics on 20 October 2001 through his founding membership of the Justice and Development Party's Kocaeli Province organization. He was elected its chairman on 22 June 2003, serving four years at this post.

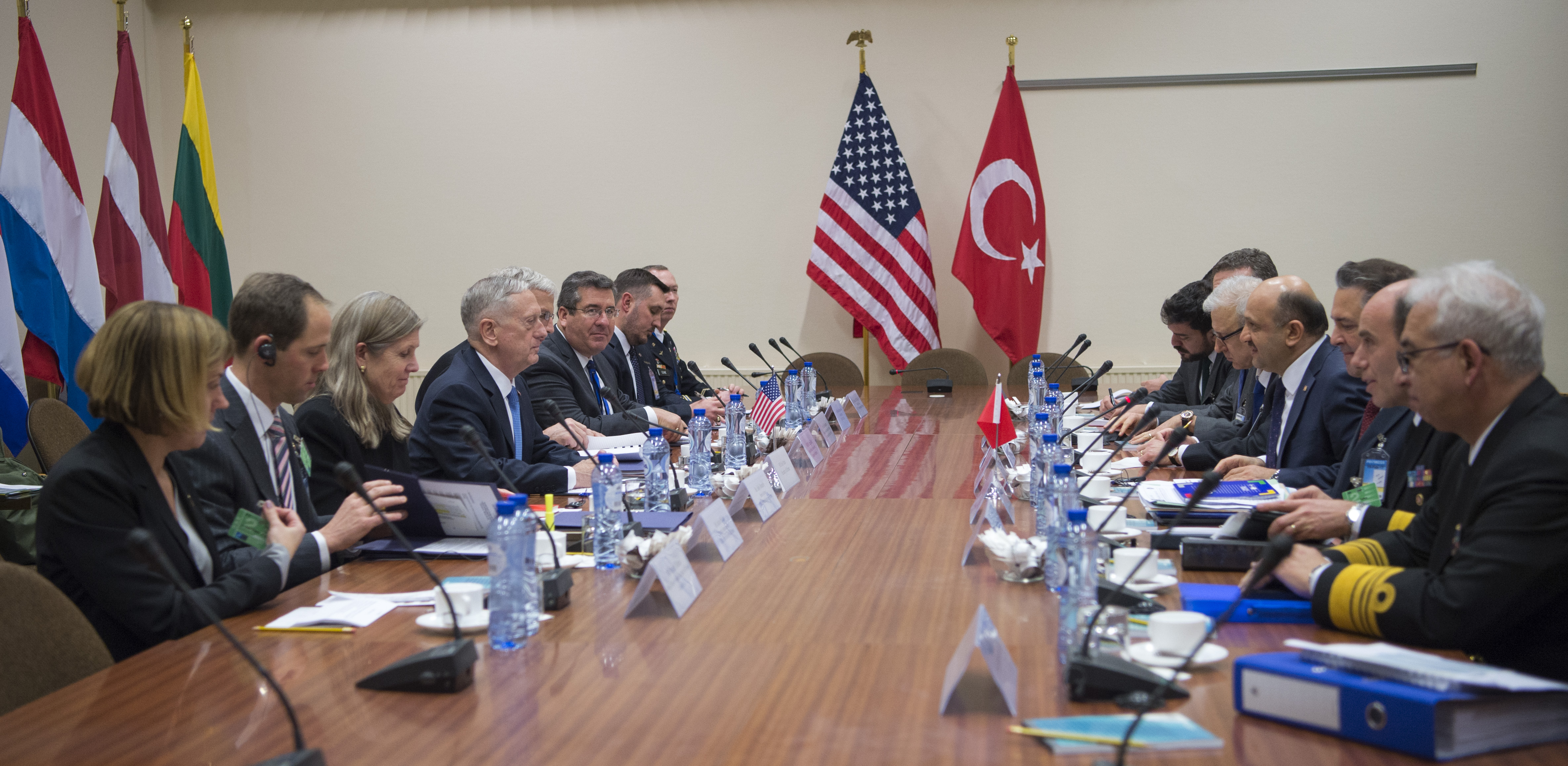
Işık meets with U.S. Secretary of Defense James Mattis at the NATO Headquarters, February 2017

In 2007, he left his chair at the regional level to run for a seat in the parliament. Işık was elected into the Grand National Assembly of Turkey in the 2007 general election as an MP from Kocaeli Province. He was re-elected a second time into the parliament in the 2011 general election. Between 2007 and 2013, he was responsible in the party headquarters for the coordination of the part's regional organizations in 47 provinces across the country. On 31 January 2013, Işık became chairman of the parliamentary National Education, Youth and Sports Commission.

On 26 December 2013, Fikri Işık assumed office as the Minister of Science, Industry and Technology, succeeding Nihat Ergün during Erdoğan's cabinet reshuffle with ten new names that was announced the day before, on 25 December, following the 2013 corruption scandal in Turkey.

== Personal life ==
Fikri Işık is married and has four children.

Political offices
Preceded by Nihat Ergün	Minister of Science, Industry and Technology; 26 December 2013 – 24 May 2016	Succeeded by Faruk Özlü
Preceded by İsmet Yılmaz	Minister of National Defence; 24 May 2016 – 19 July 2017	Succeeded by Nurettin Canikli
