= Mehmet Şimşek =

Turkish economist and politician

His Excellency Mehmet Şimşek
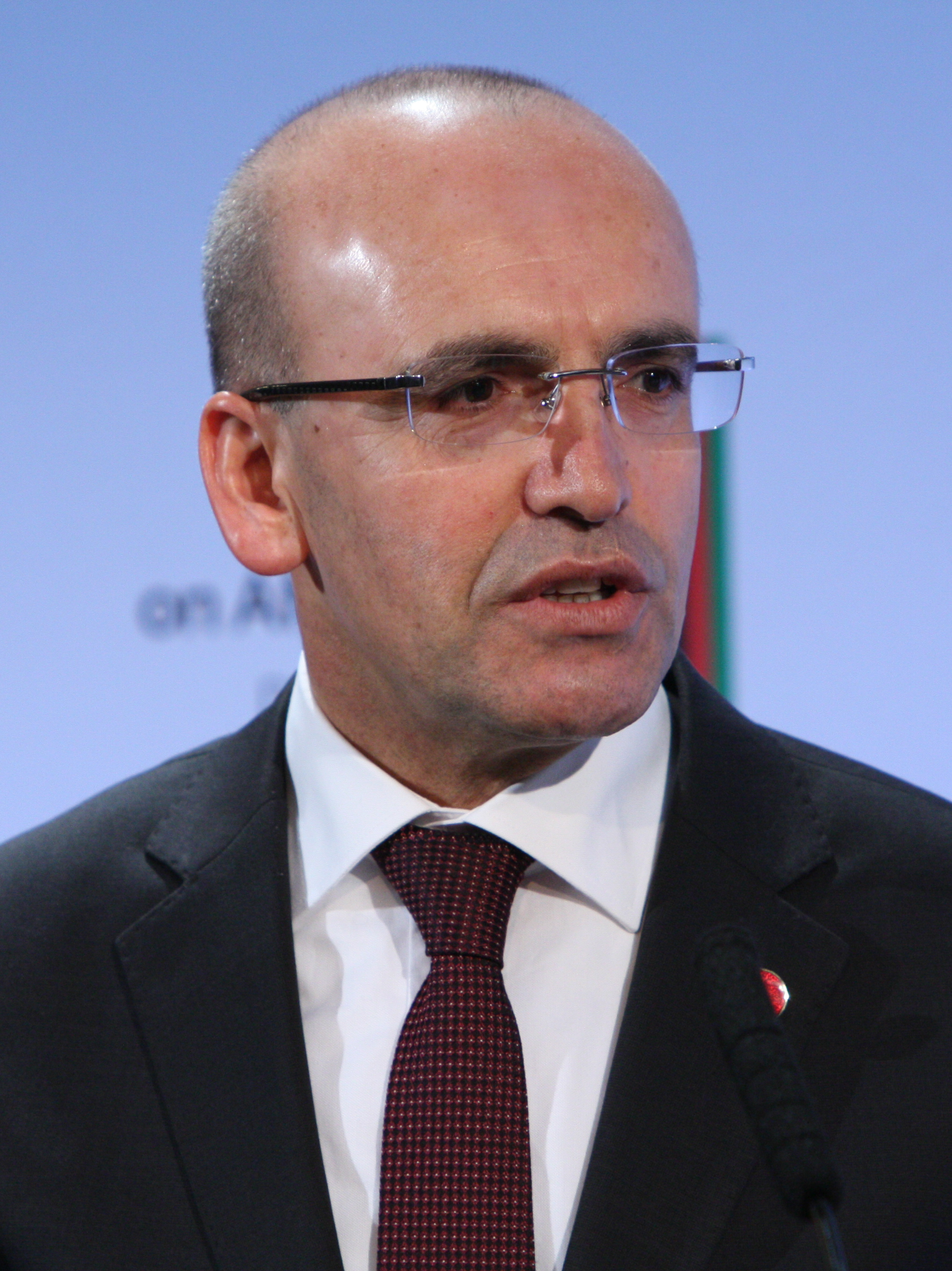
- Şimşek in 2014

Minister of Treasury and Finance
- Incumbent
- Assumed office 4 June 2023
- President: Recep Tayyip Erdoğan
- Preceded by: Nureddin Nebati
- In office 1 May 2009 – 24 November 2015
- Prime Minister: Recep Tayyip Erdoğan; Ahmet Davutoğlu
- Preceded by: Kemal Unakıtan
- Succeeded by: Naci Ağbal

Deputy Prime Minister of Turkey
- In office 24 November 2015 – 9 July 2018
- Prime Minister: Ahmet Davutoğlu; Binali Yıldırım
- Serving with: List: Recep Akdağ (2017-18) Bekir Bozdağ (2017-18) Hakan Çavuşoğlu (2017-18) Fikri Işık (2017-18) Yalçın Akdoğan (2015–16) Lütfi Elvan (2015–16) Tuğrul Türkeş (2015–17) Numan Kurtulmuş (2015–17) Nurettin Canikli (2016–17) Veysi Kaynak (2016–17)
- Preceded by: Cevdet Yılmaz
- Succeeded by: Office abolished

Minister of State for the Economy
- In office 28 August 2007 – 1 May 2009
- Prime Minister: Recep Tayyip Erdoğan
- Preceded by: Ali Babacan
- Succeeded by: Ali Babacan

Member of the Grand National Assembly
- In office 23 July 2007 – 16 May 2018
- Constituency: Gaziantep (2007, June 2015, Nov 2015); Batman (2011)

Personal details
- Born: 1 January 1967 (age 59) Gercüş, Turkey
- Citizenship: British-Turkish
- Party: Justice and Development Party
- Spouse(s): Annalise Granwald (1999–2009); Esra Kara (2010–present)
- Children: 3
- Education: Ankara University (BS); University of Exeter (MPhil)
- Cabinet: 60th, 61st, 62nd, 63rd, 64th, 65th, 67th
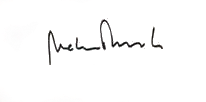
- Signature

Mehmet Şimşek (born 1 January 1967) is a Turkish politician and economist, who has been serving as the Minister of Treasury and Finance since 4 June 2023. He was the Deputy Prime Minister of Turkey from 24 November 2015 until the office's abolition on 9 July 2018. He previously served as the minister of finance from 2009 to 2015, in the cabinets of Prime Ministers of Recep Tayyip Erdoğan and Ahmet Davutoğlu. As a member of the Justice and Development Party, he was elected as a Member of Parliament for Gaziantep in the 2007 general election and for Batman in the 2011 general election.

In Prime Minister Erdoğan's second cabinet (2007–2011), Şimşek became a minister of state responsible for the economy upon his election as an MP. In 2009, he became the minister of finance. He retained his position in Erdoğan's third cabinet and the first cabinet of Ahmet Davutoğlu, who took over as prime minister in 2014.

As finance minister, Şimşek formulated fiscal policy which helped Turkey recover strongly from the 2008 financial crisis. He also undertook far reaching reforms founding the Tax Audit Board, simplifying tax regulations, enhancing taxpayers’ rights, and reducing the shadow economy.

== Early life education ==
Şimşek was born to a Kurdish family in 1967, in the village of Arıca in the Gercüş District of Batman Province in Turkey. He was the youngest of eight siblings, and his mother died when he was four years of age. He attended school in three locations, Batman, Beşiri and Gercüş. Following his graduation from high school, he opened a shop for a short while but then began to study economy at the Gazi University in Ankara, later switching to politics. Şimşek earned his B.Sc. in Economics from Ankara University in 1988. After working as a research assistant in the chair of international economics and economic development, he was awarded a state scholarship to the University of Exeter in the United Kingdom, where he earned his M.Phil. in Finance and Investments in 1993.

Şimşek previously worked as the chief economist and strategist for the emerging Europe, the Middle East and Africa region at Merrill Lynch in London for 7 years. At this time he had a number of contacts with the Turkish authorities and the Central Bank and had worked with the AKP government on economic policy. He also served as a senior economist and bank analyst for Deutsche-Bender Securities from 1998 to 2000. Şimşek spent about a year in New York City where he worked for UBS Securities in 1997. Prior to that, he was a senior economist at the U.S. Embassy in Ankara for almost four years.

== Political career ==
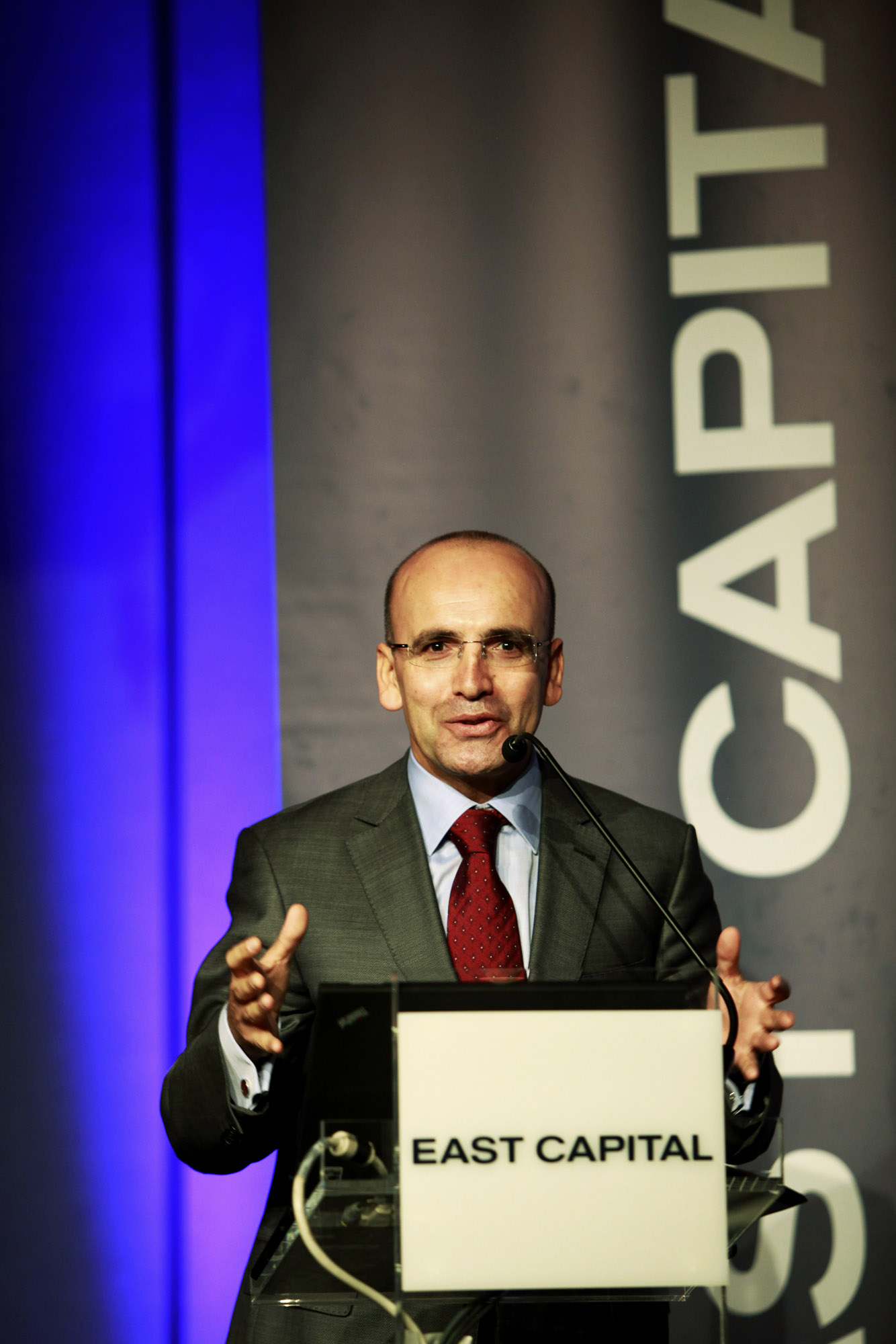
Şimşek speaking at the East Capital Istanbul Summit on 15 September 2011

Elected as an AKP Member of Parliament for Gaziantep in the 2007 general election, Şimşek began his ministerial career as a Minister of State and was promoted to the post of Finance Minister in 2009.

He was nominated as one of the 500 most powerful people on the planet by Foreign Policy in 2013 and also awarded the title of "Finance Minister of the Year for Emerging Europe 2013" by Emerging Markets magazine.

=== 2014 economic slowdown ===
Turkey experienced a reduction in economic growth in 2014, blamed by the government mainly on the problems in the Eurozone, with much of it allegedly due to political uncertainty in the country. By March 2015, the Turkish lira began losing heavy value towards the US dollar, trading at ₺2.68 to US$1. The sudden decline caused the Central Bank of Turkey to make a written intervention, with the opposition criticising President Recep Tayyip Erdoğan for intervening in economic affairs despite his neutral and ceremonial role. The economy was seen as so fragile due to the political uncertainty that a single speech by Erdoğan caused the lira to rapidly lose its value against the dollar soon after. Investors were also concerned about the future of Deputy Prime Minister Ali Babacan, who holds responsibility for the Economy.

Despite the economic slowdown, Şimşek claimed that there would be a high chance that the lira would regain its value and that inflation would fall at a fast rate in 2016. With key Islamists in government, such as Numan Kurtulmuş, openly critical about the independence of the Central Bank, Şimşek claimed that the uncertainty caused by the potential of politicising the Central Bank meant that Turkey was unlikely to return to strong economic growth in the near future.

Şimşek has since defended his record as finance minister, stating that his government was being unfairly targeted despite managing to keep its budget commitments under heavy economic pressures.

=== Poverty reduction ===
In May 2015, Şimşek said that his government had reduced poverty, as well as including a statistic that showed that the percentage of the population living below $1 a day fell from 0.2% to 0% between 2002 and 2013. The tweet generated huge controversy.

=== June 2015 general election ===
In the run-up to the June 2015 general election, Şimşek stated that populism by opposition parties would be the most significant threat to Turkey's economy, stating that the Republican People's Party's policy of increasing the minimum wage to ₺1,500 would be devastating to workers, alleging that the extra cost of hiring workers would lead to unemployment. Commenting on other policies in the Republican People's Party (CHP) manifesto, Şimşek claimed that if the party could name a source for all their spending plans, he would vote for them. The CHP subsequently gave the numerous government corruption scandals, the lavish spending on a new Presidential Palace and government waste as their funding.

In the run up to the election, Şimşek ordered the release of ₺1.325 billion of allowances to farmers and manufacturers.

After the 2018 election, Şimşek was replaced by Erdogan with Erdogan's son in law Berat Albayrak in July 2018.

=== Hacking ===
In 2019, it was revealed that Şimşek had been targeted by Project Raven; a UAE clandestine surveillance and hacking operation, targeting other governments, militants and human rights activists critical of the UAE monarchy. Using a "sophisticated spying tool called Karma" they managed to hack an iPhone belonging to Şimşek.

=== Return as finance minister ===
On 3 June 2023, after the re-election of Recep Tayyip Erdoğan as president, Şimşek was reappointed as the Minister of Treasury and Finance. He was described by Financial Times as having an orthodox view on interest rates and monetary policy.

During his duty Annual inflation in Turkey surged to 69.8% last month( April 2024), up from 43.68% in April last year, according to data published by the Turkish statistical institute.

As April 21, 2025, Turkish annual consumer price inflation slowed to 38.1% in March, extending its fall from a peak of around 75% last May.

== Personal life ==
Şimşek married twice. His first wife was an American woman, Annalise Granwald, with whom he married in Turkey on 20 January 1999. They divorced on 23 July 2009. He married Esra Kara on 9 January 2010. He has twin daughters and a son from his second marriage. In addition to Turkish, he speaks Kurdish and English fluently and has both British and Turkish citizenships.

== See also ==
- Ali Babacan
- Nihat Zeybekci

Political offices
Preceded by Ali Babacan	Minister of Economic Affairs; 2007–2009	Succeeded by Zafer Çağlayan
Preceded by Kemal Unakıtan	Minister of Finance; 2009–2015	Succeeded by Naci Ağbal
Preceded by Nureddin Nebati	Minister of Treasury and Finance; 2023–present	Incumbent
