= 65th cabinet of Turkey =

Government of the Republic of Turkey (2016-2018)

Yıldırım Cabinet Yıldırım Hükümeti
- 65th Cabinet of Turkey
- 24 May 2016
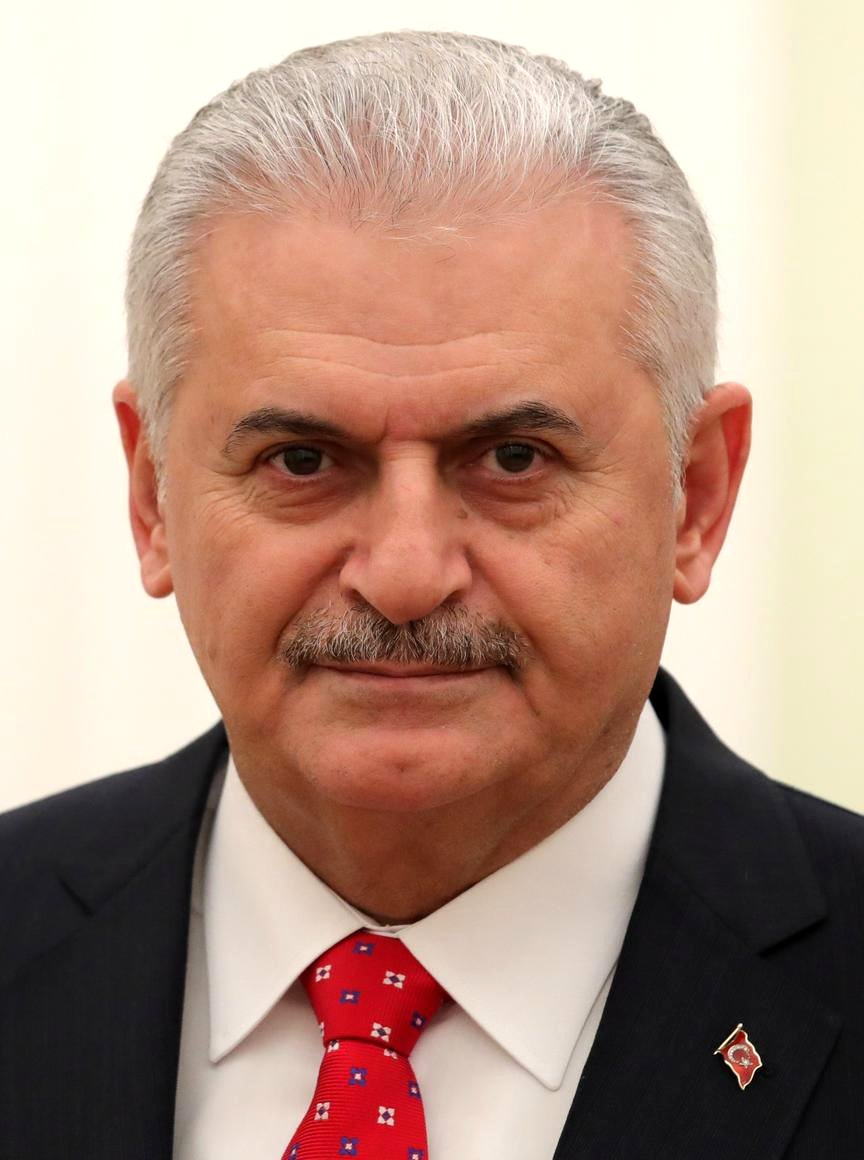
- Date formed: 24 May 2016
- Date dissolved: 9 July 2018

People and organisations
- Head of state: Recep Tayyip Erdoğan
- Head of government: Binali Yıldırım
- Member party: Justice and Development Party
- Status in legislature: Single-party majority
- Opposition party: Republican People's Party
- Opposition leader: Kemal Kılıçdaroğlu

History
- Legislature term: 26th
- Predecessor: Davutoğlu III
- Successor: Erdoğan IV

The Yıldırım Cabinet was the 65th government of the Republic of Turkey, which was declared on 24 May 2016. The cabinet was inaugurated on 29 May 2016, by the approval of the Grand National Assembly. It was composed of twenty-eight men and two women.

== Composition ==
The composition of the 65th government was as follows.

Functions	Holder	Start	End
Prime Minister; Başbakan	Binali Yıldırım	24 May 2016	9 July 2018
Deputy Prime Minister; Başbakan Yardımcısı	Nurettin Canikli	24 May 2016	19 July 2017
Deputy Prime Minister; Başbakan Yardımcısı	Recep Akdağ	19 July 2017	10 July 2018
Deputy Prime Minister; Başbakan Yardımcısı	Mehmet Şimşek	24 May 2016	10 July 2018
Deputy Prime Minister; Başbakan Yardımcısı	Numan Kurtulmuş	24 May 2016	19 July 2017
Deputy Prime Minister; Başbakan Yardımcısı	Bekir Bozdağ	19 July 2017	10 July 2018
Deputy Prime Minister; Başbakan Yardımcısı	Tuğrul Türkeş	24 May 2016	19 July 2017
Deputy Prime Minister; Başbakan Yardımcısı	Hakan Çavuşoğlu	19 July 2017	10 July 2018
Deputy Prime Minister; Başbakan Yardımcısı	Veysi Kaynak	24 May 2016	19 July 2017
Deputy Prime Minister; Başbakan Yardımcısı	Fikri Işık	19 July 2017	10 July 2018
Ministry of Foreign Affairs; Dışişleri Bakanı	Mevlüt Çavuşoğlu	24 May 2016	10 July 2018
Ministry of the Interior; İçişleri Bakanı	Efkan Ala	24 May 2016	31 August 2016
Ministry of the Interior; İçişleri Bakanı	Süleyman Soylu	31 August 2016	10 July 2018
Ministry of Finance; Maliye Bakanı	Naci Ağbal	24 May 2016	10 July 2018
Ministry of Justice; Adalet Bakanı	Bekir Bozdağ	24 May 2016	19 July 2017
Ministry of Justice; Adalet Bakanı	Abdulhamit Gül	19 July 2017	10 July 2018
Ministry of Energy and Natural Resources; Enerji ve Tabii Kaynaklar Bakanı	Berat Albayrak	24 May 2016	10 July 2018
Ministry of Food, Agriculture and Livestock; Gıda, Tarım ve Hayvancılık Bakanı	Faruk Çelik	24 May 2016	19 July 2017
Ministry of Food, Agriculture and Livestock; Gıda, Tarım ve Hayvancılık Bakanı	Ahmet Eşref Fakıbaba	19 July 2017	10 July 2018
Ministry of Culture and Tourism; Kültür ve Turizm Bakanı	Nabi Avcı	24 May 2016	19 July 2017
Ministry of Culture and Tourism; Kültür ve Turizm Bakanı	Numan Kurtulmuş	19 July 2017	10 July 2018
Ministry of Health; Sağlık Bakanı	Recep Akdağ	24 May 2016	19 July 2017
Ministry of Health; Sağlık Bakanı	Ahmet Demircan	19 July 2017	10 July 2018
Ministry of National Education; Millî Eğitim Bakanı	İsmet Yılmaz	24 May 2016	10 July 2018
Ministry of National Defence; Millî Savunma Bakanı	Fikri Işık	24 May 2016	19 July 2017
Ministry of National Defence; Millî Savunma Bakanı	Nurettin Canikli	19 July 2017	10 July 2018
Ministry of Science, Industry and Technology; Bilim, Sanayi ve Teknoloji Bakanı	Faruk Özlü	24 May 2016	10 July 2018
Ministry of Labour and Social Security; Çalışma ve Sosyal Güvenlik Bakanı	Süleyman Soylu	24 May 2016	31 August 2016
Ministry of Labour and Social Security; Çalışma ve Sosyal Güvenlik Bakanı	Mehmet Müezzinoğlu	31 August 2016	19 July 2017
Ministry of Labour and Social Security; Çalışma ve Sosyal Güvenlik Bakanı	Jülide Sarıeroğlu	19 July 2017	10 July 2018
Ministry of Transport, Maritime and Communication; Ulaştırma, Denizcilik ve Haberleşme Bakanı	Ahmet Arslan	24 May 2016	10 July 2018
Ministry of Family and Social Policy; Aile ve Sosyal Politikalar Bakanı	Fatma Betül Kaya	24 May 2016	10 July 2018
Ministry of European Union Affairs; Avrupa Birliği Bakanı	Ömer Çelik	24 May 2016	10 July 2018
Ministry of Economic Affairs; Ekonomi Bakanı	Nihat Zeybekci	24 May 2016	10 July 2018
Ministry of Youth and Sports; Gençlik ve Spor Bakanı	Akif Çağatay Kılıç	24 May 2016	19 July 2017
Ministry of Youth and Sports; Gençlik ve Spor Bakanı	Osman Aşkın Bak	19 July 2017	10 July 2018
Ministry of Development; Kalkınma Bakanı	Lütfi Elvan	24 May 2016	10 July 2018
Ministry of Customs and Trade; Gümrük ve Ticaret Bakanı	Bülent Tüfenkci	24 May 2016	10 July 2018
Ministry of Environment and Urban Planning; Çevre ve Şehircilik Bakanı	Mehmet Özhaseki	24 May 2016	10 July 2018
Ministry of Forest and Water Management; Orman ve Su İşleri Bakanı	Veysel Eroğlu	24 May 2016	10 July 2018
