= 62nd cabinet of Turkey =

Government of the Republic of Turkey (2014-2015)

First Davutoğlu Cabinet I. Davutoğlu Hükümeti
- 62nd Cabinet of Turkey
- 29 August 2014 – 28 August 2015
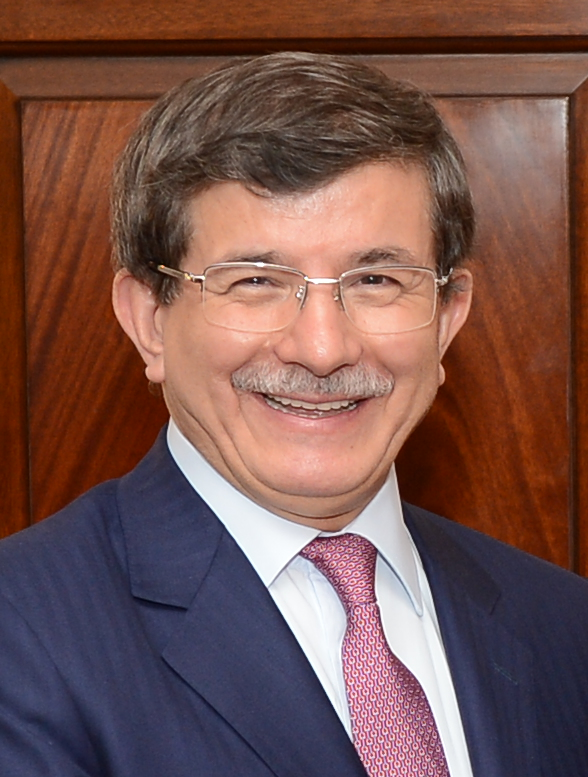
- Date formed: 29 August 2014
- Date dissolved: 28 August 2015

People and organisations
- Head of state: Recep Tayyip Erdoğan
- Head of government: Ahmet Davutoğlu
- Deputy head of government: Bülent Arınç; Ali Babacan; Yalçın Akdoğan; Numan Kurtulmuş
- No. of ministers: 26
- Total no. of members: 30
- Member party: Justice and Development Party
- Status in legislature: Single-party majority
- Opposition party: Republican People's Party
- Opposition leader: Kemal Kılıçdaroğlu

History
- Elections: 12 June 2011; 10 August 2014
- Legislature term: 24th
- Predecessor: Erdoğan III
- Successor: Interim election cabinet

The First Cabinet of Ahmet Davutoğlu was the 62nd government of the Turkish Republic, which took office on 29 August 2014. It was the fifth majority government to be formed entirely by the Justice and Development Party (AKP) and was headed by its leader and the 26th Prime Minister of Turkey, Ahmet Davutoğlu. The government assumed office during the 24th parliament of Turkey and succeeded Erdoğan's third cabinet. Davutoğlu is the third AKP politician to take office as Prime Minister, after Abdullah Gül (2002–2003) and Recep Tayyip Erdoğan (2003–2014).

The formation of the cabinet was necessitated by the election of Prime Minister Recep Tayyip Erdoğan as the 12th President of Turkey on August 10. Erdoğan, who headed the 61st government of Turkey, assumed office as President on the 28th, severing all relations with the AKP. The AKP had elected Davutoğlu as leader during an extraordinary congress on 27 August. The 62nd government of Turkey was sworn in by President Erdoğan on the 29th and was due to serve until the general election of June 2015. The failure to form a government after the election, which had resulted in a hung parliament, resulted in the government continuing its duties for much of the 25th Parliament while unsuccessful coalition negotiations were still taking place. The government was succeeded on 28 August 2015, almost exactly a year after being formed, by an interim election government as required by the Constitution of Turkey. The election government will oversee the early election that was called for November 2015.

The cabinet contained one minister who was not a Member of Parliament, namely Deputy Prime Minister Numan Kurtulmuş. Later on 3 July 2015, Vecdi Gönül also became a minister (National Defence) from outside Parliament. Hakan Fidan, the Undersecretary of the National Intelligence Organization (MİT), was also seen as a potential Minister of Foreign Affairs from outside parliament. Despite questions over his future and alleged links with Fethullah Gülen's Cemaat Movement, Ali Babacan remained as Deputy Prime Minister within the cabinet amid economic uncertainty over his position. Leading AKP politicians Binali Yıldırım, Hayati Yazıcı, Emrullah İşler and Beşir Atalay were notably not included in the cabinet.

After losing their parliamentary majority in the June 2015 general election, Prime Minister Davutoğlu arrived at the presidential palace to submit his government's resignation on 9 June 2015. President Recep Tayyip Erdoğan accepted the government's resignation, though the cabinet remained in power until Erdoğan called a general election and the interim election government was formed.

== Composition ==
Davutoğlu was formally invited by President Recep Tayyip Erdoğan to form a cabinet in the late hours of 28 August 2014. The cabinet was announced by Davutoğlu at noon the next day.

== Reshuffles ==
=== Constitutional pre-election reshuffle ===
In accordance to the 114th Article of the Turkish Constitution, the ministerial posts for the Departments of Justice, Transport and the Interior must be given to neutral permanent secretaries three months before a general election. The amendment was enacted following the 1960 coup d'état, supposedly because the serving leader of the opposition at the time, İsmet İnönü, had been delayed on a train by the government on his way to an electoral rally. Apparently for this reason, the resolution for the governing party to vacate the Transport, Justice and Interior Ministries was enacted in 1961 after the Democratic Party government was removed from power. The Justice and Development Party has promised in its manifesto to abolish this Constitutional requirement should it win the June 2015 general election. In accordance to this constitutional requirement, the following ministers were replaced by independent permanent secretaries on 7 March 2015, three months before the general election on 7 June 2015.

- Efkan Âlâ was replaced as Interior Minister by Sebahattin Öztürk
- Bekir Bozdağ was replaced as Justice Minister by Kenan İpek
- Lütfi Elvan was replaced by Transport Minister by Feridun Bilgin

=== Minister of Defence ===
After the government resigned following the June 2015 general election, the Minister of Defence İsmet Yılmaz was put forward as the AKP candidate for Speaker of the Grand National Assembly for the new Parliament and was elected in the final round. As a result, his cabinet position was automatically terminated on 1 July 2015. Prime Minister Davutoğlu stated that it was not practical given Turkey's circumstances in terms of the ongoing events in the Syrian Civil War to appoint an acting Minister, instead stating that they would appoint a new National Defence Minister until a new government was formed. Former National Defence Minister Vecdi Gönül, who had served between 2002 and 2011, was appointed to succeed Yılmaz despite not being a Member of Parliament.

== Dissolution ==
The government was scheduled to come to an end following the June 2015 general election. The AKP lost their parliamentary majority in said election, meaning that forming a new government may take significantly longer than usual due to coalition negotiations. Davutoğlu's cabinet resigned shortly after the election but stayed in power while coalition negotiations took place. With parties failing to come to a consensus, Erdoğan called an early general election for November 2015, thereby dissolving the government and inviting Davutoğlu to form an interim election government on 27 August 2015.

== Ministers ==
Functions		Holder	Start	End
English title	Turkish title	Holder	Start	End
Prime Minister	Başbakan	Ahmet Davutoğlu	28 August 2014	28 August 2015
Deputy Prime Minister; Responsible for Foundations and TRT	Başbakan Yardımcısı	Bülent Arınç	1 May 2009	28 August 2015
Deputy Prime Minister; Responsible for Religious Affairs and the Turkish World	Başbakan Yardımcısı	Numan Kurtulmuş	29 August 2014	28 August 2015
Deputy Prime Minister; Responsible for the Economy, Banking and Treasury	Başbakan Yardımcısı	Ali Babacan	28 August 2007	28 August 2015
Deputy Prime Minister; Responsible for Counter-terrorism, Human Rights and Cyprus	Başbakan Yardımcısı	Yalçın Akdoğan	29 August 2014	28 August 2015
Ministry of Foreign Affairs	Dışişleri Bakanı	Mevlüt Çavuşoğlu	29 August 2014	28 August 2015
Ministry of the Interior	İçişleri Bakanı	Efkan Ala	25 December 2013	7 March 2015
Ministry of the Interior	İçişleri Bakanı	Sebahattin Öztürk	7 March 2015	28 August 2015
Ministry of Finance	Maliye Bakanı	Mehmet Şimşek	1 May 2009	28 August 2015
Ministry of Justice	Adalet Bakanı	Bekir Bozdağ	26 December 2013	7 March 2015
Ministry of Justice	Adalet Bakanı	Kenan İpek	7 March 2015	28 August 2015
Ministry of Energy and Natural Resources	Enerji ve Tabii Kaynaklar Bakanı	Taner Yıldız	1 May 2009	28 August 2015
Ministry of Food, Agriculture and Livestock	Gıda, Tarım ve Hayvancılık Bakanı	Mehmet Mehdi Eker	29 August 2014	28 August 2015
Ministry of Culture and Tourism	Kültür ve Turizm Bakanı	Ömer Çelik	24 January 2013	28 August 2015
Ministry of Health	Sağlık Bakanı	Mehmet Müezzinoğlu	24 January 2013	28 August 2015
Ministry of National Education	Millî Eğitim Bakanı	Nabi Avcı	24 January 2013	28 August 2015
Ministry of National Defence	Millî Savunma Bakanı	İsmet Yılmaz	6 July 2011	1 July 2015
Ministry of National Defence	Millî Savunma Bakanı	Vecdi Gönül	3 July 2015	28 August 2015
Ministry of Science, Industry and Technology	Bilim, Sanayi ve Teknoloji Bakanı	Fikri Işık	25 December 2013	28 August 2015
Ministry of Labour and Social Security	Çalışma ve Sosyal Güvenlik Bakanı	Faruk Çelik	29 August 2014	28 August 2015
Ministry of Transport, Maritime and Communication	Ulaştırma, Denizcilik ve Haberleşme Bakanı	Lütfi Elvan	26 December 2013	7 March 2015
Ministry of Transport, Maritime and Communication	Ulaştırma, Denizcilik ve Haberleşme Bakanı	Feridun Bilgin	7 March 2015	28 August 2015
Ministry of Family and Social Policy	Aile ve Sosyal Politikalar Bakanı	Ayşenur İslam	26 December 2013	28 August 2015
Ministry of European Union Affairs	Avrupa Birliği Bakanı	Volkan Bozkır	29 August 2014	28 August 2015
Ministry of Economy	Ekonomi Bakanı	Nihat Zeybekçi	25 December 2013	28 August 2015
Ministry of Youth and Sports	Gençlik ve Spor Bakanı	Akif Çağatay Kılıç	25 December 2013	28 August 2015
Ministry of Development	Kalkınma Bakanı	Cevdet Yılmaz	6 July 2011	28 August 2015
Ministry of Customs and Trade	Gümrük ve Ticaret Bakanı	Nurettin Canikli	29 August 2014	28 August 2015
Ministry of Environment and Urban Planning	Çevre ve Şehircilik Bakanı	İdris Güllüce	25 December 2013	28 August 2015
Ministry of Forest and Water Management	Orman ve Su İşleri Bakanı	Veysel Eroğlu	29 August 2007	28 August 2015

Preceded by 61st government of Turkey (Recep Tayyip Erdoğan)	62nd government of Turkey; 29 August 2014 – 17 November 2015	Succeeded by 63rd government of Turkey
