= Bülent Tüfenkci =

Turkish politician (born 1966)

Bülent Tüfenkci MP

Minister of Customs and Trade
- In office 24 November 2015 – 10 July 2018
- Prime Minister: Ahmet Davutoğlu; Binali Yıldırım
- Preceded by: Cenap Aşçı

Member of the Grand National Assembly
- Incumbent
- Assumed office 7 June 2015
- Constituency: Malatya (June 2015, Nov 2015, 2018, 2023)

Personal details
- Born: January 1, 1966 (age 60) Yeşilyurt, Malatya, Turkey
- Party: Justice and Development Party (AKP)
- Education: Ankara University
- Occupation: Lawyer, politician
- Cabinet: 64th, 65th
- Website: bulenttufenkci.com.tr

Bülent Tüfenkci (born 1 January 1966) is a Turkish politician from the Justice and Development Party (AKP) was the Minister of Customs and Trade from 2015 in the third government of Ahmet Davutoğlu. He was also a Member of Parliament for the electoral district of Malatya since 7 June 2015. His surname is sometimes spelt 'Tüfekçi', without an 'n'.

== Early life and career ==
Bülent Tüfenkci was born in Yeşilyurt, Malatya Province on 1 January 1966. He completed his primary education there and graduated from Yeşilyurt Imam Hatip school, before going on to study at the Ankara University Faculty of Law. After graduating from university in 1984, Tüfenkci completed a master's degree, specialising in customs law.

== Political career ==
Tüfenkci participated in the establishment of the Justice and Development Party (AKP) Malatya branch, serving in numerous positions until 2011. He became the provincial President of the AKP's Malatya Branch in 2011, serving until 2015. He was elected as a Member of Parliament for the electoral district of Malatya in the June 2015 general election and was re-elected in the November 2015 general election.

=== Minister of Customs and Trade ===
After the AKP won a parliamentary majority in the November 2015 election, Tüfenkci was appointed as the Minister of Customs and Trade by Prime Minister and AKP leader Ahmet Davutoğlu, who formed his third cabinet on 24 November 2015. His appointment was approved by President Recep Tayyip Erdoğan on the same day. He succeeded Cenap Aşçı, who has served as Customs and Trade Minister in the interim election government between 28 August and 17 November 2015. Ruhsar Pekcan took over in 2018.

== See also ==
- 25th Parliament of Turkey
- 26th Parliament of Turkey
