= Veli Ağbaba =

Turkish politician (born 1968)

Veli Ağbaba MP
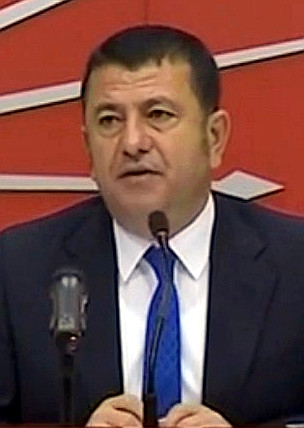

Deputy leader of the Republican People's Party
- Incumbent
- Assumed office 8 May 2014
- Leader: Kemal Kılıçdaroğlu; Özgür Özel

Member of the Grand National Assembly
- Incumbent
- Assumed office 12 June 2011
- Constituency: Malatya (2011, June 2015, Nov 2015, 2018, 2023)

Personal details
- Born: April 3, 1968 (age 58) Yazıhan, Malatya
- Party: Republican People's Party
- Occupation: Politician

Veli Ağbaba (born 3 April 1968) is a Turkish politician from the Republican People's Party (CHP), who has served as a Member of Parliament for Malatya since 12 June 2011.

== Early life and education ==
Veli Ağbaba was born in Yazıhan, Malatya Province, on 3 April 1968 as the son of Hüseyin and Elif Ağbaba. He completed his high school education in Malatya at Turan Emeksiz High School. He graduated from Anadolu University in 1989. In his youth, Ağbaba founded the Anadolu University Student Association. He is married with three children.

== Political career ==
Ağbaba joined Social Democratic Populist Party (SHP) in 1993 after his military service. He served as a Malatya Municipal Councillor between 1994 and 1999. In the local elections of 18 April 1999, Ağbaba was elected Republican People's Party (CHP) Provincial President.

=== Member of Parliament ===
Ağbaba was elected as a CHP Member of Parliament for Malatya in the 2011 general election. He was re-elected in June 2015 and November 2015. He is a member of the Atatürkist Thought Association, a secular organization that espouses the ideas of Mustafa Kemal Atatürk, the founder of modern Turkey.

A report that up to 400 workers had been killed during the construction of the new Istanbul Airport prompted Ağbaba to lodge a written questionnaire to the Turkish parliament on 13 February 2018.

== Books authored ==
- Balyoz Kumpası
- Kalemi Kırılan Gazeteciler
