= Ahmet Kenan Tanrıkulu =

Turkish politician (born 1958)

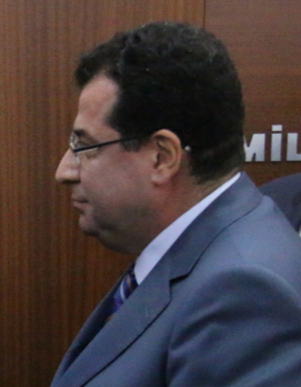

Minister of Industry and Commerce
- In office 28 May 1999 – 18 November 2002
- Prime Minister: Bülent Ecevit
- Preceded by: Metin Şahin
- Succeeded by: Ali Coşkun

Deputy Leader of the Nationalist Movement Party
- In office 4 November 2012 – 26 August 2015
- Leader: Devlet Bahçeli

Member of the Grand National Assembly
- In office 22 July 2007 – 7 July 2018
- Constituency: İzmir (II) (2007, 2011, June 2015, Nov 2015)
- In office 18 April 1999 – 3 November 2002
- Constituency: İzmir (II) (1999)

Personal details
- Born: May 17, 1958 (age 68) Istanbul, Turkey
- Party: Nationalist Movement Party (MHP)
- Education: Ankara University
- Occupation: Civil servant, politician

Ahmet Kenan Tanrıkulu (born 17 May 1958) is a Turkish politician and economist from the Nationalist Movement Party (MHP), who has served as the Member of Parliament for İzmir's second electoral district since 2007, having previously served between 1999 and 2002. From 1999 to 2002, he served as the Minister of Industry and Commerce in the coalition government of Bülent Ecevit, before losing his seat at the 2002 general election. Re-elected as an MP in the 2007, 2011 and again in June 2015 general election, Tanrıkulu served as the Deputy Leader of the MHP from 2012 to 2015. He resigned as Deputy Leader after he was offered, but declined, a ministerial position by Prime Minister Ahmet Davutoğlu during the formation of an interim election government in August 2015.

== Early life and career ==
=== Education ===
Ahmet Kenan Tanrıkulu was born on 17 May 1958 in Istanbul. He graduated from the Ankara University Faculty of Political Sciences as an economist. He completed his master's degree on the topic of mathematical economics at the Western Illinois University in the United States. He also studied macro modelling at the University of Pennsylvania Wharton School, expert economics at the University of Colorado, transportation planning at the University of Bradford in the United Kingdom and public diplomacy at the National Security Academy of Turkey.

=== Civil service ===
Tanrıkulu worked as a planning expert at the State Planning Organisation (DPT) and became an advisor to Ministries of State. He was a general director of Environmental Impact Assessment and planning at the Ministry of Environment and Urban Planning and also served as the Assistant Undersecretary to the Ministry of Tourism. His articles have been published in both national and international magazines.

== Political career ==
=== Minister of Industry and Commerce ===
Tanrıkulu left the civil service and was elected as a Member of Parliament for İzmir's second electoral district in the 1999 general election. The MHP came second, falling behind the Democratic Left Party (DSP) led by Bülent Ecevit. Ecevit subsequently formed a three-party coalition between the DSP, the MHP and the Motherland Party (ANAP). In the government, Tanrıkulu became the Minister of Industry and Commerce and served until early elections were called in 2002. He, along with all other MHP MPs, lost his seat after his party polled below the 10% election threshold in the election.

=== Nationalist Movement Party ===
A member of the MHP since 1999, Tanrıkulu worked for the Ankara Idealist Hearths and also at the Idealist Hearths headquarters. He has been a member of the MHP Central Executive Committee (MYK) since 2000. In 2010, he led the Presidency of the MHP Research and Development Sectoral and Regional Policies. During the 10th Ordinary Congress that took place on 4 November 2012, he became the Deputy Leader responsible for economic and social affairs. He was elected as an MP, again for İzmir's second electoral district, in the 2007 general election. He was re-elected in the 2011 general election and the June 2015 general election. As an MP, he served as a member of the Turkish delegation to the Parliamentary Assembly of the Organization for Security and Co-operation in Europe and the Turkey-EU Joint Parliamentary Committee. He has also been a member of the European Union Standards Commission and the Environment Commission. Following the 11th Nationalist Movement Party Ordinary Congress held on 21 March 2015, he became the chair of the Central Executive Committee.

Tanrıkulu was one of the three MHP politicians who were offered ministerial positions by Justice and Development Party leader Ahmet Davutoğlu in August 2015. Davutoğlu had been tasked by President Recep Tayyip Erdoğan to form an interim election government after coalition negotiations proved unsuccessful and resulted in Erdoğan calling an early election. Since the MHP had 80 MPs during the formation of the interim government, the party was entitled to 3 ministries in the cabinet, though party leader Devlet Bahçeli announced that the MHP would not take part and give up their three ministries to independent politicians. Tanrıkulu subsequently declined Davutoğlu's offer and resigned as the Deputy Leader of the MHP in protest to the invitation.

== See also ==
- 57th government of Turkey
