= Ali Rıza Alaboyun =

Turkish politician (born 1957)

Minister of Energy and Natural Resources
- In office 28 August 2015 – 17 November 2015
- Prime Minister: Ahmet Davutoğlu
- Preceded by: Taner Yıldız
- Succeeded by: Berat Albayrak

Member of the Grand National Assembly
- In office 3 November 2002 – 7 June 2015
- Constituency: Aksaray (2002, 2007, 2011)

Personal details
- Born: Ali Rıza Alaboyun; 8 March 1957 (age 69) Aksaray, Turkey
- Party: Independent (de jure); Justice and Development Party (AKP) (2002-2015)
- Education: Istanbul Technical University; Pennsylvania State University
- Occupation: Politician
- Cabinet: 63rd

Ali Rıza Alaboyun (born 8 March 1957) is a Turkish politician who served as the Minister of Energy and Natural Resources in the interim election government formed by Prime Minister Ahmet Davutoğlu between 28 August and 17 November 2015. He was a member of the Justice and Development Party (AKP) from the party's creation until 2015, after which he resigned in order to participate in the election government as an Independent. Before becoming a Minister, Alaboyun served as a Member of Parliament for the electoral district of Aksaray between 2002 and 2015, stepping down at the June 2015 general election due to the AKP's three-term limit on its parliamentarians.

== Early life and career ==
Ali Rıza Alaboyun was born on 8 March 1957 in Aksaray and graduated from Istanbul Technical University Faculty of Minerals. He later travelled to the United States to obtain a master's degree from Pennsylvania State University, specialising in the topics of mineral processing and engineering management. He began his career working for the General Directorate of Mineral Research and Exploration (MTA) and the General Directorate of Mining Affairs. He later became a Deputy General Director of Etibank and served on the bank's executive board.

== Political career ==
=== Parliamentary career ===
Alaboyun joined the Justice and Development Party (AKP) and was elected as an AKP Member of Parliament for the electoral district of Aksaray in the 2002 general election. During the 22nd Parliament, he served as the Deputy President of the Turkey-EU Joint Parliamentary Committee. He was re-elected as an MP in the 2007 general election and the 2011 general election. He served as the President of the Interparliamentary Belgium friendship group and was also a member of the Turkish delegation to the NATO Parliamentary Assembly from 2002 to 2011. In 2011, he became the Leader of the NATO Parliamentary Assembly Turkish delegation. Due to the three-term limit imposed on AKP parliamentarians, Alaboyun was unable to seek re-election in the June 2015 general election and subsequently stepped down from Parliament.

== Minister of Energy and Natural Resources ==
After the June 2015 general election resulted in a hung parliament, unsuccessful coalition negotiations raised speculation over whether President Recep Tayyip Erdoğan would call an early election in the event that AKP leader Ahmet Davutoğlu was unable to form a government within the given constitutional time of 45 days. As required by the 114th article of the Constitution of Turkey, the calling of a snap general election by the President necessitates the forming of an interim election government, in which all parties represented in Parliament are given a certain number of ministers according to how many MPs they have. If a party refused to send ministers to the interim cabinet, then independents must take their place.

Erdoğan called a new general election for November 2015 in late August, with Davutoğlu being tasked with the formation of the interim government. With the main opposition Republican People's Party (CHP) and the Nationalist Movement Party (MHP) refusing to send ministers to the cabinet, the 8 ministries that the two parties were entitled to were vacated for independents. As a result, Alaboyun was appointed Minister of Energy and Natural Resources as an independent politician, resigning his AKP membership in order to participate.

=== Controversy ===
Although Alaboyun is technically required to be independent of any political party due to his civil service position and his role in the interim election government, he had served as a three-term Justice and Development Party (AKP) MP from 2002 to 2015, only resigning his party membership so that he could participate in the election government as an independent. His close affiliation to the AKP despite supposedly being an independent resulted in opposition media outlets branding him, as well as numerous other 'independent' cabinet ministers close to the AKP, as 'partisan independents'.

== See also ==
- Taner Yıldız
