= 63rd cabinet of Turkey =

Government of the Republic of Turkey (2015)

II. Davutoğlu Cabinet II. Davutoğlu Hükümeti
- 63rd Cabinet of Turkey
- 28 August 2015 – 17 November 2015
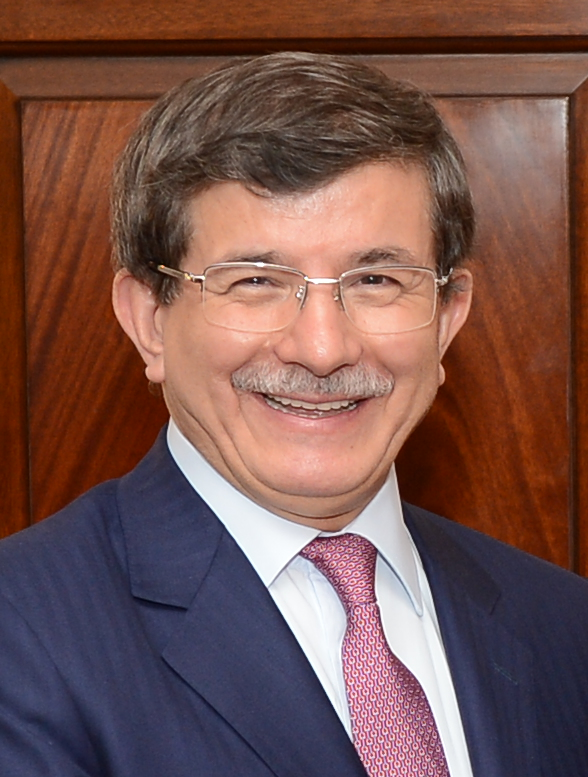
- Date formed: 28 August 2015
- Date dissolved: 24 November 2015

People and organisations
- Head of state: Recep Tayyip Erdoğan
- Head of government: Ahmet Davutoğlu
- No. of ministers: 26
- Ministers removed: 2
- Member party: AKP (13 ministers); Independents (13 ministers); HDP (2 ministers)

History
- Election: June 2015
- Legislature term: 25th
- Predecessor: Davutoğlu I
- Successor: Davutoğlu III

The Second Cabinet of Ahmet Davutoğlu was a temporary election government formed by Prime Minister Ahmet Davutoğlu on the request of President Recep Tayyip Erdoğan. It is also referred to as the Second Davutoğlu Cabinet. As the 63rd government of Turkey, the cabinet presided over the November 2015 general election and dissolved after a new government was formed after the election. It is the first such government to take office in the history of the Turkish Republic.

After the Justice and Development Party (AKP) won back its majority in the November election, the interim election government formally dissolved on 24 November 2015 and was succeeded by AKP leader Ahmet Davutoğlu's third government.

== Background ==
The June 2015 general election resulted in a hung parliament, with the Justice and Development Party (AKP) falling 18 seats short of a majority. President Recep Tayyip Erdoğan invited AKP leader Ahmet Davutoğlu to form a government, by virtue of leading the largest party in the Grand National Assembly. After a series of unsuccessful coalition negotiations with the main opposition Republican People's Party (CHP) and the Nationalist Movement Party (MHP), Davutoğlu returned the mandate to the President five days before the 45-day allowance to form a government ended, after which Erdoğan controversially refused to invite the CHP leader Kemal Kılıçdaroğlu to form a government and instead announced his intention to call a snap general election. Amid rumours that Erdoğan had always favoured going into an early election rather than allowing his former party (the AKP) to form a coalition government, his decision to call an election was finalised on 24 August 2015 and the Supreme Electoral Council of Turkey (YSK) announced 1 November as the date for the new vote.

=== Constitutional provision ===
As enshrined in the Constitution of Turkey, an interim cabinet formed together by all the parties in Parliament must be formed in the event that the President calls for a new vote. The number of ministries given to each party is determined by how many MPs they have in Parliament. The Speaker of the Grand National Assembly, İsmet Yılmaz, determined that the AKP would be given 11 ministries, the CHP 5, the MHP 3 and the Peoples' Democratic Party (HDP) also 3. The Ministry of Transport, Maritime and Communication, Ministry of Justice and the Ministry of the Interior would be overseen by independent ministers, as is also the case for any government going into an election. Parties who do not wish to take part in the government can opt out, in which case the individual tasked with forming the government (in this case Davutoğlu) must offer their ministries to independents. The CHP and MHP announced that they would not take part in the government.

=== Formation process ===
Davutoğlu was tasked with forming the interim cabinet on 25 August 2015, after which he sent out letters to members of different parties offering them a ministerial position in the new government on 26 August 2015. He has five days to form a government. Amid claims that the AKP was uncomfortable with going into government along with politicians from the HDP, Davutoğlu made offers to CHP and MHP politicians despite their party leaders announcing that they would not take part. It was also rumoured that Davutoğlu could offer ministerial positions to independents who were seen as close or formerly a member of the CHP and MHP to weaken the perception that the interim government was just an AKP-HDP coalition. In a last-ditch attempt to keep the HDP out of government, Davutoğlu proposed a triple coalition government between the AKP, CHP and MHP until an election took place. The offer was rejected by both the CHP and MHP.

== Ministerial appointments ==
=== Initial invitations ===
The following tables show the politicians from all four parties represented in Parliament that were invited to become ministers in the interim cabinet.

AKP seats: 258, ministries: 11 (+ Prime minister)
Invited	Response
Yalçın Akdoğan	✓ Accepted
Numan Kurtulmuş	✓ Accepted
Cevdet Yılmaz	✓ Accepted
Mehmet Şimşek	✓ Accepted
Mehmet Müezzinoğlu	✓ Accepted
Nabi Avcı	✓ Accepted
Fikri Işık	✓ Accepted
Nihat Zeybekçi	✓ Accepted
Akif Çağatay Kılıç	✓ Accepted
İdris Güllüce	✓ Accepted
Veysel Eroğlu	✓ Accepted
Party stance	✓ Accept

CHP seats: 131, ministries: 5
Invited	Response
Deniz Baykal	✗ Declined
Erdoğan Toprak	✗ Declined
Gülsün Bilgehan	✗ Declined
Tekin Bingöl	✗ Declined
İlhan Kesici	✗ Declined
Party stance	✗ Decline

MHP seats: 80, ministries: 3
Invited	Response
Tuğrul Türkeş	✓ Accepted
Meral Akşener	✗ Declined
Kenan Tanrıkulu	✗ Declined
Party stance	✗ Decline

HDP seats: 80, ministries: 3
Invited	Response
Ali Haydar Konca	✓ Accepted
Levent Tüzel	✗ Declined
Müslüm Doğan	✓ Accepted
Party stance	✓ Accept

MHP MP Tuğrul Türkeş caused an uproar within his party after accepting Davutoğlu's invitation to become a minister, despite his party's staunch refusal to take part. The MHP issued a statement demanding that he resign from the party and that he would be suspended if he didn't do so. The MHP later began disciplinary proceedings to suspend Türkeş from the party, while Davutoğlu praised him for showing true statesmanship. He was formally suspended from the MHP on 5 September 2015, with the MHP subsequently falling behind the HDP and becoming the fourth largest party in Parliament with 79 seats.

HDP MP Levent Tüzel rejected a ministerial position despite his party's approval of its MPs to participate. The reason was due to opposition by the Labour Party (EMEP) to Tüzel's involvement. Tüzel had founded the EMEP in 1996 and led it until 2011, with the party supporting the HDP in the June 2015 general election.

With 8 politicians declining ministerial positions and the Ministries of Transport, Interior and Justice being reserved for non-partisan independents, the cabinet will consist of 12 independent ministers.

== Composition ==
Function	Holder	Party	Start	End
Prime Minister; Başbakan	Ahmet Davutoğlu	AKP	28 August 2014	17 November 2015
Deputy Prime Minister; Başbakan Yardımcısı Responsible for Parliamentary relations and public diplomacy	Yalçın Akdoğan	AKP	29 August 2014	17 November 2015
Deputy Prime Minister; Başbakan Yardımcısı Government spokesperson and responsible for human rights	Numan Kurtulmuş	AKP	29 August 2014	17 November 2015
Deputy Prime Minister; Başbakan Yardımcısı Responsible for the economy	Cevdet Yılmaz	AKP	28 August 2015	17 November 2015
Deputy Prime Minister; Başbakan Yardımcısı Responsible for relations with the Council of State, the Cyprus dispute and the National Security Council	Tuğrul Türkeş	MHP until 5 September 2015	28 August 2015	17 November 2015
Deputy Prime Minister; Başbakan Yardımcısı Responsible for relations with the Council of State, the Cyprus dispute and the National Security Council	Tuğrul Türkeş	Independent; 5-18 September 2015	28 August 2015	17 November 2015
Deputy Prime Minister; Başbakan Yardımcısı Responsible for relations with the Council of State, the Cyprus dispute and the National Security Council	Tuğrul Türkeş	AKP since 18 September 2015	28 August 2015	17 November 2015
Ministry of Foreign Affairs; Dışişleri Bakanı	Feridun Sinirlioğlu	Independent	28 August 2015	17 November 2015
Ministry of the Interior; İçişleri Bakanı	Selami Altınok	Independent	28 August 2015	17 November 2015
Ministry of Finance; Maliye Bakanı	Mehmet Şimşek	AKP	1 May 2009	17 November 2015
Ministry of Justice; Adalet Bakanı	Kenan İpek	Independent	7 March 2015	17 November 2015
Ministry of Energy and Natural Resources; Enerji ve Tabii Kaynaklar Bakanı	Ali Rıza Alaboyun	Independent (Formerly AKP)	28 August 2015	17 November 2015
Ministry of Food, Agriculture and Livestock; Gıda, Tarım ve Hayvancılık Bakanı	Kutbettin Arzu	Independent (Formerly AKP)	28 August 2015	17 November 2015
Ministry of Culture and Tourism; Kültür ve Turizm Bakanı	Yalçın Topçu	Independent	28 August 2015	17 November 2015
Ministry of Health; Sağlık Bakanı	Mehmet Müezzinoğlu	AKP	24 January 2013	17 November 2015
Ministry of National Education; Millî Eğitim Bakanı	Nabi Avcı	AKP	24 January 2013	17 November 2015
Ministry of National Defence; Millî Savunma Bakanı	Vecdi Gönül	Independent (Formerly AKP)	3 July 2015	17 November 2015
Ministry of Science, Industry and Technology; Bilim, Sanayi ve Teknoloji Bakanı	Fikri Işık	AKP	25 December 2013	17 November 2015
Ministry of Labour and Social Security; Çalışma ve Sosyal Güvenlik Bakanı	Ahmet Erdem	Independent	28 August 2015	17 November 2015
Ministry of Transport, Maritime and Communication; Ulaştırma, Denizcilik ve Haberleşme Bakanı	Feridun Bilgin	Independent	7 March 2015	17 November 2015
Ministry of Family and Social Policy; Aile ve Sosyal Politikalar Bakanı	Ayşen Gürcan	Independent	28 August 2015	17 November 2015
Ministry of European Union Affairs; Avrupa Birliği Bakanı	Ali Haydar Konca	HDP	28 August 2015	22 September 2015
Ministry of European Union Affairs; Avrupa Birliği Bakanı	Beril Dedeoğlu	Independent	22 September 2015	17 November 2015
Ministry of Economy; Ekonomi Bakanı	Nihat Zeybekçi	AKP	25 December 2013	17 November 2015
Ministry of Youth and Sports; Gençlik ve Spor Bakanı	Akif Çağatay Kılıç	AKP	25 December 2013	17 November 2015
Ministry of Development; Kalkınma Bakanı	Müslüm Doğan	HDP	28 August 2015	22 September 2015
Ministry of Development; Kalkınma Bakanı	Cüneyd Düzyol	Independent	22 September 2015	17 November 2015
Ministry of Customs and Trade; Gümrük ve Ticaret Bakanı	Cenap Aşçı	Independent	28 August 2015	17 November 2015
Ministry of Environment and Urban Planning; Çevre ve Şehircilik Bakanı	İdris Güllüce	AKP	25 December 2013	17 November 2015
Ministry of Forest and Water Management; Orman ve Su İşleri Bakanı	Veysel Eroğlu	AKP	29 August 2007	17 November 2015

== Controversies ==
=== Pro-AKP Independents ===
With 11 independents due to be appointed, it was observed that many independents were in fact former AKP politicians or individuals with close ties with the AKP. These included the following ministers.

It was revealed that Ali Rıza Alaboyun, Kutbettin Arzu and Vecdi Gönül all resigned from the AKP shortly before the cabinet was formed so that they could take part as an Independent. Cenap Aşçı was a civil servant with no political affiliation before his appointment, despite trying unsuccessfully to become an AKP parliamentary candidate.

Minister	Position	Link with AKP
Ali Rıza Alaboyun	Ministry of Energy and Natural Resources	AKP MP for Aksaray between 2002 and 2015
Kutbettin Arzu	Ministry of Food, Agriculture and Livestock	AKP MP for Diyarbakır between 2007 and 2011
Vecdi Gönül	Ministry of National Defence	AKP MP from 2002 to 2015, AKP National Defence Minister from 2002 to 2011
Cenap Aşçı	Ministry of Customs and Trade	AKP parliamentary candidacy applicant in 2011 and June 2015
