= 64th cabinet of Turkey =

Government of the Republic of Turkey 2015 to 2016

Third Davutoğlu Cabinet III. Davutoğlu Hükümeti
- 64th Cabinet of Turkey
- 24 November 2015 – 24 May 2016
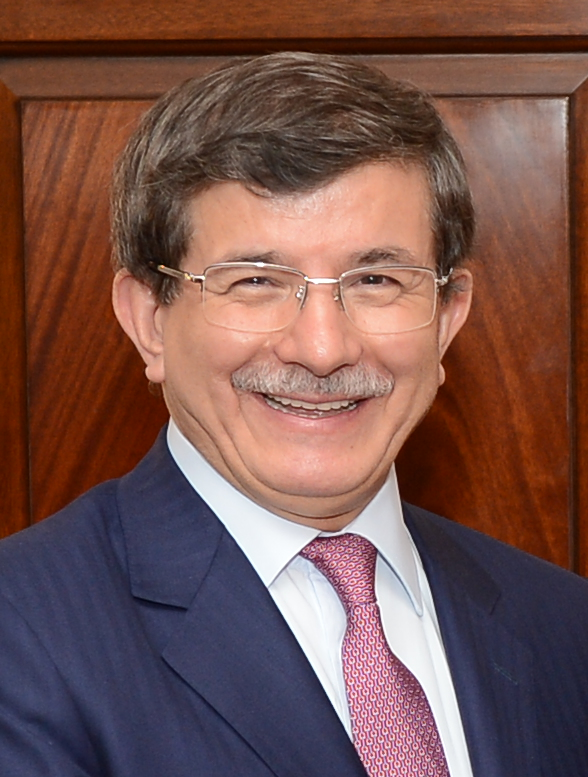
- Date formed: 24 November 2015
- Date dissolved: 24 May 2016

People and organisations
- Head of state: Recep Tayyip Erdoğan
- Head of government: Ahmet Davutoğlu
- Member party: Justice and Development Party
- Status in legislature: Single-party majority
- Opposition party: Republican People's Party
- Opposition leader: Kemal Kılıçdaroğlu

History
- Election: 1 November 2015
- Legislature term: 26th
- Predecessor: 2015 Interim election cabinet
- Successor: Yıldırım

The Third Davutoğlu Cabinet is the 64th government of the Republic of Turkey. The government came into effect after the Justice and Development Party (AKP), led by Prime Minister Ahmet Davutoğlu, won a parliamentary majority of 84 in the November 2015 general election with 317 seats in the Grand National Assembly and 49.5% of the vote.

President Recep Tayyip Erdoğan formally invited Ahmet Davutoğlu to form a government on 17 November 2015. Amid delays in the formal inauguration that were attributed to disagreements between Erdoğan and Davutoğlu on the government's composition, the government was finalised and accepted on 24 November 2015.

On 22 May 2016, Davutoğlu submitted the government's resignation on behalf of the cabinet to President Recep Tayyip Erdoğan after stepping down as leader of the AKP following reports of disagreements with Erdoğan. The cabinet continued in office until a new government was formed by Davutoğlu's successor as AKP leader, Binali Yıldırım.

== Proposed structural changes ==
Between the election and the formal inauguration of the new government, the Ministry of Development began working on the establishment of one new government ministry and splitting six others into two. The proposals, according to the pro-government Sabah newspaper, involved a new 'Migration Ministry' to deal with the European migrant crisis.

== Composition ==
Functions	Holder		Start	End
Prime Minister; Başbakan		Ahmet Davutoğlu	28 August 2014	24 May 2016
Deputy Prime Minister; Başbakan Yardımcısı		Yalçın Akdoğan	24 November 2015	24 May 2016
Deputy Prime Minister; Başbakan Yardımcısı		Numan Kurtulmuş	24 November 2015	24 May 2016
Deputy Prime Minister; Başbakan Yardımcısı		Tuğrul Türkeş	24 November 2015	24 May 2016
Deputy Prime Minister; Başbakan Yardımcısı		Lütfi Elvan	24 November 2015	24 May 2016
Deputy Prime Minister; Başbakan Yardımcısı		Mehmet Şimşek	24 November 2015	24 May 2016
Ministry of Foreign Affairs; Dışişleri Bakanı		Mevlüt Çavuşoğlu	24 November 2015	24 May 2016
Ministry of the Interior; İçişleri Bakanı		Efkan Ala	24 November 2015	24 May 2016
Ministry of Finance; Maliye Bakanı		Naci Ağbal	24 November 2015	24 May 2016
Ministry of Justice; Adalet Bakanı		Bekir Bozdağ	24 November 2015	24 May 2016
Ministry of Energy and Natural Resources; Enerji ve Tabii Kaynaklar Bakanı		Berat Albayrak	24 November 2015	24 May 2016
Ministry of Food, Agriculture and Livestock; Gıda, Tarım ve Hayvancılık Bakanı		Faruk Çelik	24 November 2015	24 May 2016
Ministry of Culture and Tourism; Kültür ve Turizm Bakanı		Mahir Ünal	24 November 2015	24 May 2016
Ministry of Health; Sağlık Bakanı		Mehmet Müezzinoğlu	24 November 2015	24 May 2016
Ministry of National Education; Millî Eğitim Bakanı		Nabi Avcı	24 November 2015	24 May 2016
Ministry of National Defence; Millî Savunma Bakanı		İsmet Yılmaz	24 November 2015	24 May 2016
Ministry of Science, Industry and Technology; Bilim, Sanayi ve Teknoloji Bakanı		Fikri Işık	24 November 2015	24 May 2016
Ministry of Labour and Social Security; Çalışma ve Sosyal Güvenlik Bakanı		Süleyman Soylu	24 November 2015	24 May 2016
Ministry of Transport, Maritime and Communication; Ulaştırma, Denizcilik ve Haberleşme Bakanı		Binali Yıldırım	24 November 2015	24 May 2016
Ministry of Family and Social Policy; Aile ve Sosyal Politikalar Bakanı		Sema Ramazanoğlu	24 November 2015	24 May 2016
Ministry of European Union Affairs; Avrupa Birliği Bakanı		Volkan Bozkır	24 November 2015	24 May 2016
Ministry of Economic Affairs; Ekonomi Bakanı	Mustafa Elitaş	Mustafa Elitaş	24 November 2015	24 May 2016
Ministry of Youth and Sports; Gençlik ve Spor Bakanı		Akif Çağatay Kılıç	24 November 2015	24 May 2016
Ministry of Development; Kalkınma Bakanı		Cevdet Yılmaz	24 November 2015	24 May 2016
Ministry of Customs and Trade; Gümrük ve Ticaret Bakanı		Bülent Tüfenkci	24 November 2015	24 May 2016
Ministry of Environment and Urban Planning; Çevre ve Şehircilik Bakanı		Fatma Güldemet Sarı	24 November 2015	24 May 2016
Ministry of Forest and Water Management; Orman ve Su İşleri Bakanı		Veysel Eroğlu	24 November 2015	24 May 2016

== Dissolution ==
The resignation of the cabinet was initially announced on 5 May 2016 by Prime Minister Ahmet Davutoğlu, who announced that he was stepping down as AKP leader and Prime Minister following a breakdown in relations with President Recep Tayyip Erdoğan. The resignation of the cabinet was formally submitted on 22 May 2016 after Binali Yıldırım was elected as Davutoğlu's successor in the 2nd AKP Extraordinary Congress and stayed in office until Yıldırım formed the 65th government of Turkey on 24 May 2016.
