= Kutbettin Arzu =

Turkish politician (1955–2023)

Minister of Food, Agriculture and Livestock
- In office 28 August 2015 – 17 November 2015
- Prime Minister: Ahmet Davutoğlu
- Preceded by: Mehmet Mehdi Eker
- Succeeded by: Faruk Çelik

Member of the Grand National Assembly
- In office 22 July 2007 – 12 June 2011
- Constituency: Diyarbakır (2007)

Personal details
- Born: Kutbettin Arzu; 1 April 1955 Diyarbakır, Turkey
- Died: 30 August 2023 (aged 68) Yalova, Turkey
- Party: Independent (de jure); Justice and Development Party (AKP) (before 2015)
- Education: Karadeniz Technical University
- Occupation: Politician
- Cabinet: 63rd

Kutbettin Arzu (1 April 1955 – 30 August 2023) was a Turkish politician who served as the Minister of Food, Agriculture and Livestock in the interim election government formed by Prime Minister Ahmet Davutoğlu between 28 August and 17 November 2015. He was a Justice and Development Party (AKP) politician, having served as a Member of Parliament for the electoral district of Diyarbakır between 2007 and 2011. He was the AKP's mayoral candidate for Diyarbakır in the 2009 local elections, but lost to the pro-Kurdish Democratic Society Party (DTP).

== Early life and career ==
Kutbettin Arzu was born on 1 April 1955 in the village of Bahteri, Diyarbakır. He is of Kurdish origin. He graduated from the Department of Architecture at the Karadeniz Technical University Faculty of Architecture and Engineering. He obtained his master's degree in the same university and department. He worked as the Chief Architect at the 15th Regional Directorate of Construction Works, later forming his own Engineering-Architecture company. He was appointed an honorary lecturer at Dicle University Faculty of Architecture and Engineering and served as the President of the Diyarbakır Chamber of Architects.

Arzu also served as a Diyarbakir Red Crescent Society member, Culture and Solidarity Foundation member, Aceveda Foundation Regional Advisory Council member, Diyarbakir Chamber of Commerce Board member and later President, TOBB Trade and Industry Chamber Council Member and as the Diyarbakır Organized Industrial Zone Entrepreneur Committee Vice Chairman.

== Politics ==
=== Parliamentary career ===
Arzu joined the Justice and Development Party (AKP) and became a Member of Parliament for the electoral district of Diyarbakır between 2007 and 2011, elected in the 2007 general election. In 2011, he was appointed the Deputy Minister of Agriculture. He was the AKP's mayoral candidate for Diyarbakır in the 2009 local elections, but lost to the pro-Kurdish Democratic Society Party (DTP).

== Minister of Food, Agriculture and Livestock ==
After the June 2015 general election resulted in a hung parliament, unsuccessful coalition negotiations raised speculation over whether President Recep Tayyip Erdoğan would call an early election in the event that AKP leader Ahmet Davutoğlu was unable to form a government within the given constitutional time of 45 days. As required by the 114th article of the Constitution of Turkey, the calling of a snap general election by the President necessitates the forming of an interim election government, in which all parties represented in Parliament are given a certain number of ministers according to how many MPs they have. If a party refused to send ministers to the interim cabinet, then independents must take their place.

Erdoğan called a new general election for November 2015 in late August, with Davutoğlu being tasked with the formation of the interim government. With the main opposition Republican People's Party (CHP) and the Nationalist Movement Party (MHP) refusing to send ministers to the cabinet, the 8 ministries that the two parties were entitled to were vacated for independents. As a result, Arzu was appointed Minister of Food, Agriculture and Livestock as an independent politician, resigning his AKP membership in order to participate.

=== Appointment controversy ===
Although Arzu was technically required to be independent of any political party due to his civil service position and his role in the interim election government, he had previously served as a Justice and Development Party (AKP) MP from 2007 to 2011 and Deputy Minister of Agriculture from 2011 to 2015, only resigning his party membership so that he could participate in the election government as an independent. His close affiliation to the AKP despite supposedly being an independent resulted in opposition media outlets branding him, as well as numerous other 'independent' cabinet ministers close to the AKP, as 'partisan independents'.

== Death ==
Kutbettin Arzun died on 30 August 2023, at the age of 68.

== See also ==
- Mehmet Mehdi Eker
