= Cenap Aşcı =

Turkish politician and civil servant

Minister of Customs and Trade
- In office 28 August 2015 – 17 November 2015
- Prime Minister: Ahmet Davutoğlu
- Preceded by: Nurettin Canikli
- Succeeded by: Bülent Tüfenkci

Undersecretary to the Customs and Trade Ministry
- Incumbent
- Assumed office 26 August 2015
- Minister: Nurettin Canikli
- Preceded by: Neşet Akkoç

Personal details
- Born: 1967 (age 58–59) Aksaray, Turkey
- Party: Independent (de jure)
- Other political affiliations: Justice and Development Party (AKP)
- Education: Istanbul University
- Occupation: Civil servant, politician
- Cabinet: 63rd

Cenap Aşcı (born 1967) is a Turkish politician and civil servant who served as the Minister of Customs and Trade in the interim election government formed by Prime Minister Ahmet Davutoğlu from 28 August to 17 November 2015. Two days before he was appointed as a Minister, he had been appointed as the Undersecretary to the Customs and Trade Ministry on 26 August 2015. He had applied to become a Justice and Development Party (AKP) parliamentary candidate in both the 2011 and June 2015 general elections, but was unsuccessful on both occasions.

== Early life and career ==
Cenap Aşcı was born in 1967 in Aksaray and graduated from the Department of Public Administration in the Istanbul University Faculty of Political Sciences. Having worked in the civil service after graduation, he briefly studied abroad to obtain a master's degree before returning to the civil service in May 2004.

=== Customs and trade ===
He began his career in the civil service as Deputy Customs Inspector at the Ministry of Finance and Trade. He became a Customs Inspector in 1993 and was appointed as the Chief Customs Inspector in 2000. After returning to the civil service in 2004, he served as the Deputy Head of Internal Audit at the Undersecretariat of Customs until May 2005, after which he became the Office Manager at the General Directorate of Customs. While serving in this position, he became the Deputy Director of the Ankara Directorate of Electricity, Gas and Busses (EGO) on 4 January 2008.

== Minister of Customs and Trade ==
After the June 2015 general election resulted in a hung parliament, unsuccessful coalition negotiations raised speculation over whether President Recep Tayyip Erdoğan would call an early election in the event that AKP leader Ahmet Davutoğlu was unable to form a government within the given constitutional time of 45 days. As required by the 114th article of the Constitution of Turkey, the calling of a snap general election by the President necessitates the forming of an interim election government, in which all parties represented in Parliament are given a certain number of ministers according to how many MPs they have. If a party refused to send ministers to the interim cabinet, then independents must take their place.

Erdoğan called a new general election for November 2015 in late August, with Davutoğlu being tasked with the formation of the interim government. With the main opposition Republican People's Party (CHP) and the Nationalist Movement Party (MHP) refusing to send ministers to the cabinet, the 8 ministries that the two parties were entitled to were vacated for independents. As a result, Aşcı was appointed as the Minister of Customs and Trade as an independent politician.

Aşcı's rise to become Customs and Trade minister caused commotion on social media because of his rise from Director to Undersecretary to Minister in a matter of just three days. While serving as the General Director of Customs, he was appointed as the Undersecretary to the Ministry of Customs and Trade on 26 August, though the formal appointment was confirmed on 27 August. One day later on 28 August, Aşcı was appointed as the Minister of Customs and Trade.

== See also ==
- List of Turkish civil servants
