= Mehmet Ersoy =

Turkish businessman and politician (born 1968)

Mehmet Nuri Ersoy
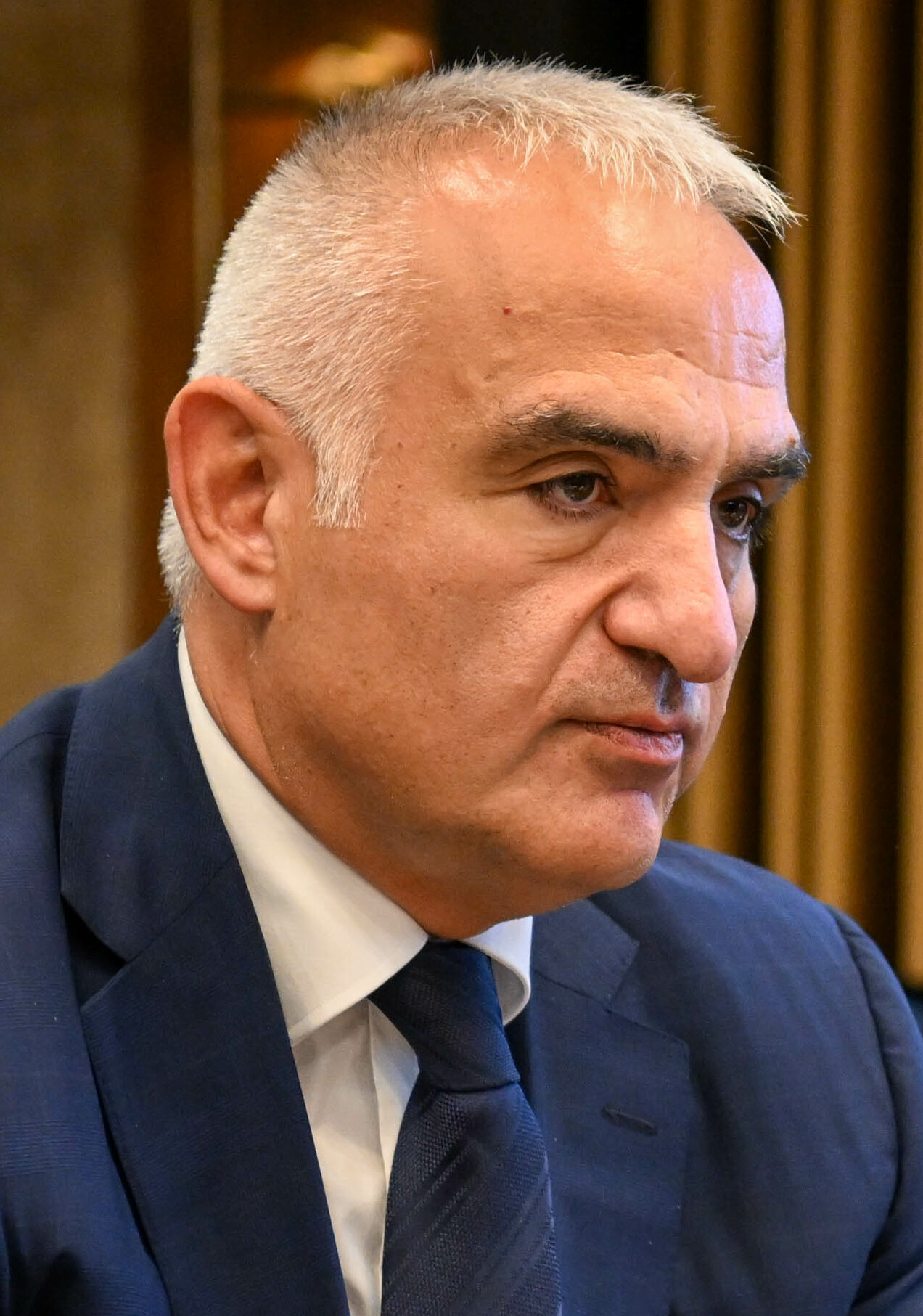
- Ersoy in 2023

Minister of Culture and Tourism
- Incumbent
- Assumed office 10 July 2018
- President: Recep Tayyip Erdoğan
- Preceded by: Numan Kurtulmuş

Personal details
- Born: 1968 (age 57–58) Istanbul, Turkey
- Education: Deutsche Schule Istanbul
- Alma mater: Istanbul University (BA)
- Occupation: Businessperson

Mehmet Nuri Ersoy (born 1968) is a Turkish businessman and current Turkish Minister of Culture and Tourism.

Ersoy was born in Istanbul, Turkey, in 1968. After completing his secondary education in the Deutsche Schule Istanbul, he studied Business Administration in the English language at Istanbul University. In 1991, he founded the tourism company "Ersoy Turistik Servisleri" (ETS), together with his twin brother Murat. More companies in the tourism branch followed with "Voyage Hotels Group" in 1999, "Didim Tur" as part of the ETS in 2001, and the airline company AtlasGlobal, known as Atlasjet, joining the group of companies in 2004.

On July 9, 2018, the newly elected president of Turkey Recep Tayyip Erdoğan announced his cabinet. Ersoy was appointed Minister of Culture and Tourism.

After the 2025 Kartalkaya hotel fire killed at least 79 people, Ersoy stated that the fire department found "no negative situation regarding fire competence" at the hotel during inspections in 2021 and 2024. Countering Ersoy's statements, Bolu city mayor Tanju Özcan said that the fire department had not certified the hotel since 2007 which is when Bolu was an AKP-run municipality, adding that:

The Minister is personally responsible for this incident. To evade responsibility, he dares despicably accuse our municipality. The hotel is outside Bolu's city limits, so the Ministry of Tourism is in charge. ... We are forced to respond to slander from the incompetent Minister.

Political offices
Preceded by Numan Kurtulmuş	Minister of Culture and Tourism; July 10, 2018–present	Succeeded by incumbent
