= Nabi Avcı =

Turkish politician (born 1953)

Nabi Avcı MP
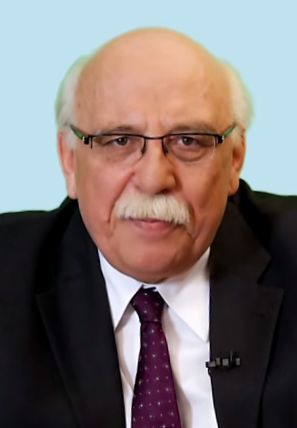

Minister of Culture and Tourism
- In office 24 May 2016 – 19 July 2017
- Prime Minister: Binali Yıldırım
- Preceded by: Mahir Ünal
- Succeeded by: Numan Kurtulmuş

Minister of National Education
- In office 24 January 2013 – 24 May 2016
- Prime Minister: Recep Tayyip Erdoğan; Ahmet Davutoğlu
- Preceded by: Ömer Dinçer
- Succeeded by: İsmet Yılmaz

Member of the Grand National Assembly
- Incumbent
- Assumed office 12 June 2011
- Constituency: Eskişehir (2011, June 2015, Nov 2015, 2018)

Personal details
- Born: 8 October 1953 (age 72) Demirköy, Pazaryeri, Bilecik, Turkey
- Party: Justice and Development Party (AKP)
- Education: Middle East Technical University (BS); Anadolu University (PhD)
- Occupation: Politician; academic
- Cabinet: 61st, 62nd, 63rd, 64th, 65th

Nabi Avcı (born 8 October 1953, in Demirköy, Pazaryeri, Bilecik, Turkey) is a Turkish academic, writer and politician who was formerly chief advisor to the Turkish Prime Minister Recep Tayyip Erdoğan.

== Early years ==
Nabi Avcı was born to Abdullah Avcı and his wife Habibe. He graduated from Middle East Technical University's Faculty of Administrative science, and earned later his PhD in Communication science from Anadolu University. In 1974, Avcı entered Ministry of Culture as a clerk.

== Career ==
During the foundation years of Anadolu University, he served as a lecturer at the Faculty of Communication science. Avcı was appointed as advisor at the Ministry of National Education and to the Prime Minister. He worked also as the program director at a television channel as well as a newspaper columnist and advisor to the editor-in-chief.

In 2000, he became a professor of Communication science at Istanbul Bilgi University. Avcı was appointed 2003 as chief advisor to the Prime minister.

Nabi Avcı served as a board member of the Scientific and Technological Research Council of Turkey (TÜBİTAK) and chairman of the Turkey National Committee of UNESCO.

=== Politics ===
Avcı was elected as a Member of Parliament for Eskişehir in the 2011 general election. On 24 January 2013, he was appointed Minister of National Education replacing Ömer Dinçer in the cabinet.

== Family life ==
Avcı is married and has five children.

== Books ==
Avcı has authored a number of books, including four that have been described as Traditionalist, also translating René Guénon's The Crisis of the Modern World into Turkish as Modern Dünyanın Bunalımı.

Political offices
Preceded by Ömer Dinçer	Minister of National Education; 24 January 2013– 24 May 2016	Succeeded by İsmet Yılmaz
Preceded by Mahir Ünal	Minister of Culture and Tourism; 24 May 2016– 19 July 2017	Succeeded by Numan Kurtulmuş
