= Mehmet Mehdi Eker =

Turkish politician

Mehdi Eker
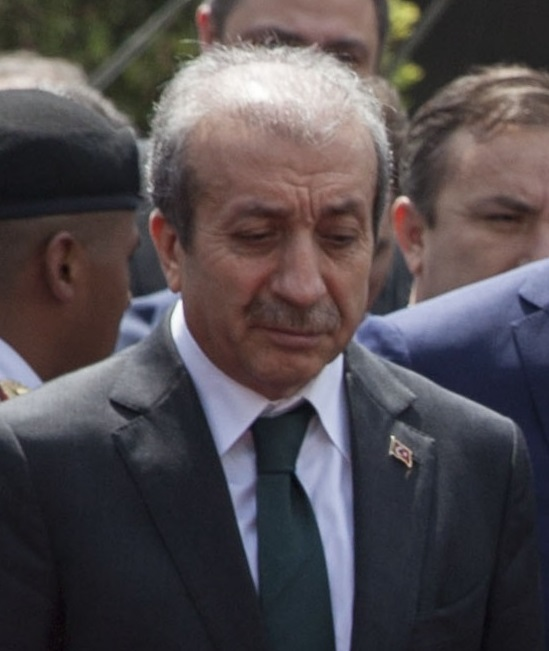

Minister of Food, Agriculture and Livestock
- In office 2 June 2005 – 28 August 2015
- Prime Minister: Recep Tayyip Erdoğan; Ahmet Davutoğlu
- Preceded by: Sami Güçlü
- Succeeded by: Kutbettin Arzu

Member of the Grand National Assembly
- Incumbent
- Assumed office 8 July 2018
- Constituency: Diyarbakır (2018)
- In office 19 November 2002 – 7 June 2015
- Constituency: Diyarbakır (2002, 2007, 2011)

Personal details
- Born: 1 January 1956 (age 70) Bismil, Diyarbakır, Turkey
- Party: Justice and Development Party
- Spouse: Yasemin Eker
- Education: Ankara University

Mehmet Mehdi Eker is a Kurdish-Turkish politician who served as the Minister of Food, Agriculture and Livestock of Turkey from 2005 until 2015. He was elected a Member of Parliament for the electoral district of Diyarbakır for Democratic People's Party in 2002. He was re-elected in 2007 and 2011 for the Justice and Development Party (AKP). He was again elected as an MP in 2018.

A veterinarian and agro-economist he had a career as a civil servant in the ministry of agriculture before entering politics at the age of 46.

As minister of Agriculture he has had to deal with issues including:

- The bird flu epidemic of 2005, in which he made a statement that it was safe to eat cooked chicken and then famously refused to do so on television.
- Adjusting food control regulations to comply with EU norms, including recategorising pork and horse meat as suitable for human consumption.
