= Aksaray (electoral district) =

Electoral district for the Grand National Assembly of Turkey

Coordinates: 37°50′N 34°45′E

- electoral district for the Grand National Assembly of Turkey
- Aksaray shown within Turkey
- Province: Aksaray
- Electorate: 247,089

Current electoral district
- Created: 1991
- Seats: 4 Historical: 3 (2007–2023)
- Turnout at last election: 82.51%
- Representation
- AK Party: 3 / 4

Aksaray is an electoral district of the Grand National Assembly of Turkey. It elects three members of parliament (deputies) to represent the province of the same name for a four-year term by the D'Hondt method, a party-list proportional representation system.

== Members ==
Population reviews of each electoral district are conducted before each general election, which can lead to certain districts being granted a smaller or greater number of parliamentary seats. Aksaray's seats fell from four to three in the 2011 general election.

MPs for Aksaray, 2002 onwards
Election	2002 (22nd parliament)	2007 (23rd parliament)	2011 (24th parliament)	June 2015 (25th parliament)	November 2015 (26th parliament)
MP	Ruhi Açıkgöz; AK Party			Nevzat Palta; AK Party	Cengiz Aydoğdu; AK Party
MP	Ramazan Toprak; AK Party	İlknur İncegöz; AK Party			
MP	Ali Rıza Alaboyun; AK Party			Turan Yaldır; MHP	Mustafa Serdengeçti; AK Party
MP	Ahmet Yaşar; AK Party	Osman Ertuğrul; MHP	No seat		

== General elections ==
=== 2011 ===
2011 general election: Aksaray
Party	Candidate	Votes	%	±%
AK Party	3 elected 0: 1. Ali Rıza Alaboyun ✓; 2. Ruhi Açıkgöz ✓; 3. İlknur İncegöz ✓	132,455	66.09	▲2.66
MHP	None elected ▼1: 1. Kılıçaslan Baykan ✗; 2. Mustafa Tuğrul Karacaer ✗; 3. Rahim Aydın ✗	36,030	17.98	▲1.93
CHP	None elected: 1. Mahmut Öztürk ✗; 2. Özlem Güneş ✗; 3. Muammer Dilek ✗	23,494	11.72	▲1.32
Büyük Birlik	None elected: 1. Servet Karatay ✗; 2. Bekir Oruç ✗; 3. Seyhan Aral ✗	2,085	1.04	▲1.04
SAADET	None elected: 1. Levent Serdar Şahin ✗; 2. Kazım Serkan Şimşek ✗; 3. İsmail Yılmaz ✗	1,823	0.91	▼0.67
HAS Party	None elected: 1. İbrahim Baykan ✗; 2. Hakan Oflaz ✗; 3. Sinan Gülden ✗	1,538	0.77	▲0.77
DP	None elected: 1. Halil Demir ✗; 2. Vahit Belge ✗; 3. Abdullah Çavdar ✗	1,072	0.53	▼3.72
DYP	None elected: 1. Osman Tekin ✗; 2. Zeyni Yavuz ✗; 3. Hüsnü Erden ✗	391	0.20	▲0.20
DSP	None elected: 1. Ramazan Altınok ✗; 2. Aydın Çapacı ✗; 3. Mustafa Yılmaz ✗	303	0.15	N/A
Labour	None elected: 1. Enis Tartan ✗; 2. Gültekin Surun ✗; 3. Musa Mehmet ✗	261	0.13	▼0.06
HEPAR	None elected: 1. Fatih Mehmet Gelişen ✗; 2. Osman Girgin ✗; 3. Bekir Gürcan Söyler ✗	234	0.12	▲0.12
Nationalist Conservative	None elected: 1. Özdemir Kale ✗; 2. Kadir Yılmaz ✗; 3. Meliha Köse ✗	221	0.11	▲0.11
MP	None elected: 1. Ali Ünal ✗; 2. İsmail Dinke ✗; 3. Nevzat Yolcu ✗	202	0.10	▲0.10
Communist_Party_of_Turkey_(today)	None elected: 1. Aslıhan Erdoğan Uçak ✗; 2. Esin Saraçoğlu ✗; 3. Süleyman Hamarat ✗	138	0.07	▼0.07
Independent	None elected: Abdullah İnaltekin ✗	97	0.05	▼0.69
Liberal Democrat	None elected: 1. Ayşe Gül Orçin ✗; 2. Bican Uluç Alpsan ✗; 3. Hakan Artoksi ✗	60	0.03	▼0.12
Total votes		200,404	100.00	
Rejected ballots		3,466	1.70	▲0.77
Turnout		203,870	82.51	▲0.65

=== June 2015 ===
Abbr.	Party	Votes	%
AKP	Justice and Development Party	119,896	58.5%
MHP	Nationalist Movement Party	62,171	30.3%
CHP	Republican People's Party	13,705	6.7%
HDP	Peoples' Democratic Party	3,487	1.7%
SP	Felicity Party	2,691	1.3%
	Other	2,995	1.5%
Total		204,945	
Turnout		82.42	
source: YSK

=== June 2015 ===
Abbr.	Party	Votes	%
AKP	Justice and Development Party	151,423	71.6%
MHP	Nationalist Movement Party	38,256	18.1%
CHP	Republican People's Party	15,590	7.4%
HDP	Peoples' Democratic Party	1,650	0.8%
SP	Felicity Party	859	0.4%
	Other	3,646	1.7%
Total		211,424	
Turnout		84.51	
source: YSK

=== 2018 ===
Abbr.	Party	Votes	%
AKP	Justice and Development Party	125,326	55.2%
MHP	Nationalist Movement Party	46,588	20.5%
IYI	Good Party	24,193	10.7%
CHP	Republican People's Party	21,756	9.6%
HDP	Peoples' Democratic Party	2,461	1.1%
SP	Felicity Party	1,886	0.8%
	Other	4,768	2.1%
Total		226,978	
Turnout		87.00	
source: YSK

=== 2023 ===
Elected in the 2023 Turkish parliamentary election:

Member	Political party
Cengiz Aydoğdu	Justice and Development Party
Hüseyin Altınsoy	Justice and Development Party
Ramazan Kaşlı	Nationalist Movement Party (MHP)
Turan Yaldır	Good Party

== Presidential elections ==
=== 2014 ===
2014 presidential election: Aksaray
Party	Candidate	Votes	%
AK Party	Recep Tayyip Erdoğan	136,892	74.00
Independent	Ekmeleddin İhsanoğlu	45,392	24.54
HDP	Selahattin Demirtaş	2,701	1.46
Total votes		184,985	100.00
Rejected ballots		4,351	2.30
Turnout		189,336	75.84
Recep Tayyip Erdoğan win			
