= Taner Yıldız =

Turkish politician (born 1962)

Taner Yıldız MP
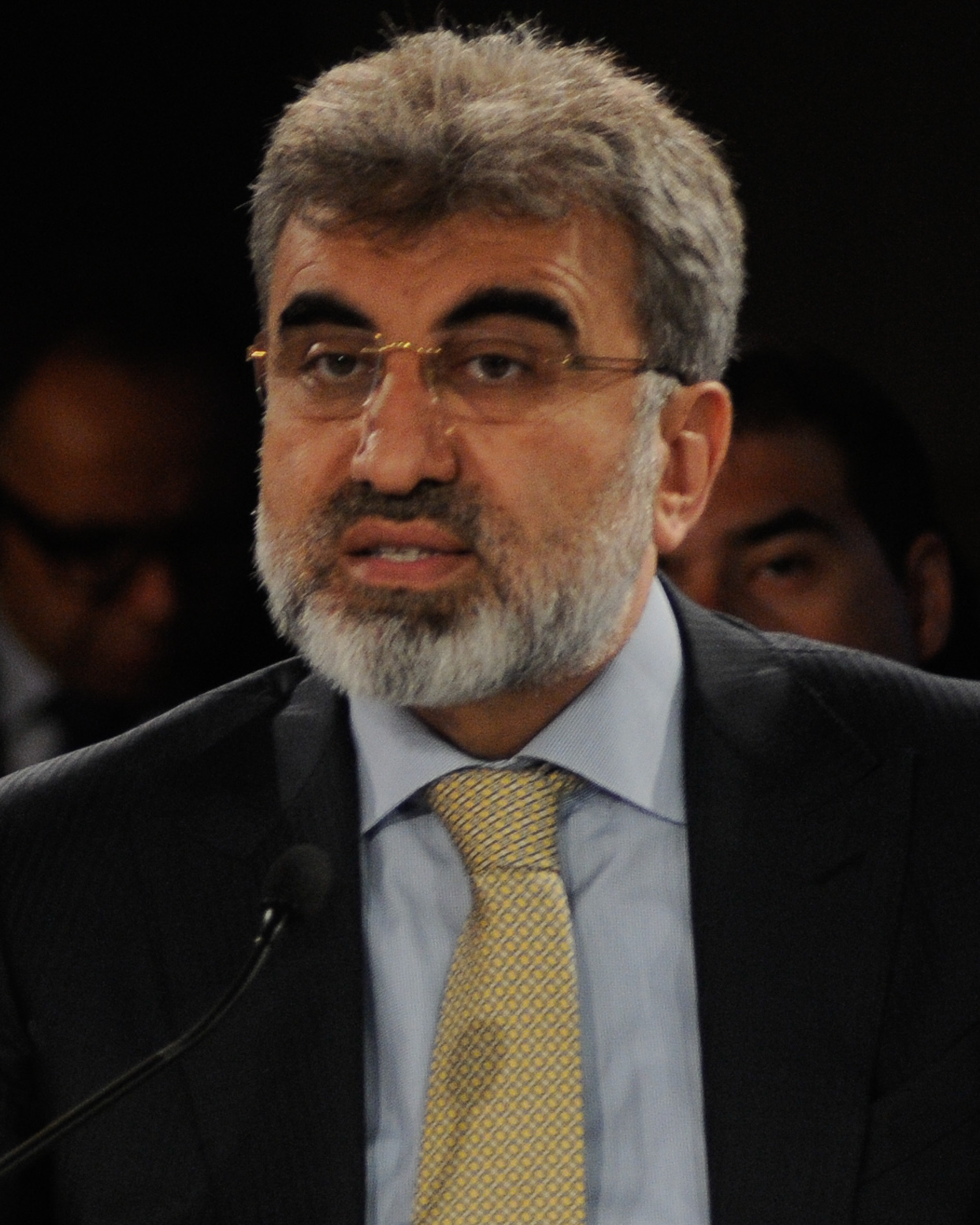

Minister of Energy and Natural Resources
- In office 1 May 2009 – 28 August 2015
- Prime Minister: Recep Tayyip Erdoğan; Ahmet Davutoğlu
- Preceded by: Mehmet Hilmi Güler
- Succeeded by: Ali Rıza Alaboyun

Member of the Grand National Assembly
- Incumbent
- Assumed office 1 November 2015
- Constituency: Kayseri (Nov 2015, 2018)
- In office 19 November 2002 – 7 June 2015
- Constituency: Kayseri (2002, 2007, 2011)

Personal details
- Born: 3 April 1962 (age 64) Devecipınar, Boğazlıyan, Yozgat Province, Turkey
- Party: Justice and Development Party (AKP)
- Children: 4
- Education: Istanbul Technical University
- Profession: Politician, electrical engineer

Taner Yıldız (born 3 April 1962 in Devecipınar, Boğazlıyan, Yozgat Province) is a Turkish politician. He is a member of the Justice and Development Party and served as the Minister of Energy and Natural Resources between 2009 and 2015.

Taner Yıldız graduated from the Istanbul Technical University as an electrical engineer and worked for the Kayseri Electricity Generation Company. He was elected to the Parliament in 2002. Yıldız served as an energy adviser to the prime minister Recep Tayyip Erdoğan. On 1 May 2009, after a reshuffle of the cabinet, he took the post of Minister of Energy and Natural Resources.

Yıldız is married and has four children.

== Citations ==
- Turkish Energy Minister to visit Azerbaijan, Trend (English), 01/20/2011, retrieved 01/20/2011.
- Iran eyes Europe gas market through Turkey, Trend, (English), 01/09/2011, retrieved 01/20/2011.
- Turkish energy minister due to Iran, Trend (English), 01/07/2011, retrieved 01/20/2011.
- Turkey in talks with France over nuclear plant, Trend (English), 01/07/2011, retrieved 01/20/2011.
- Turkey and Japan sign Memorandum of Understanding on construction of nuclear power plant, Trend (English), 12/25/2010, retrieved 01/20/2011.
- Minister: Turkey paid about $1 billion for Azerbaijani gas from Shah Deniz, Trend (English), 12/24/2010, retrieved 01/20/2011.
- Energy minister of Georgia and Turkey to discuss electricity transmission line, Trend (English), 12/12/2010, retrieved 01/20/2011.
- Minister: Turkey determined to continue oil, gas trade with Iran, Trend (English), 10/02/2010, retrieved 01/20/2011.

Political offices
Preceded by Mehmet Hilmi Güler	Minister of Energy and Natural Resources; 1 May 2009 – 28 August 2015	Succeeded by Ali Rıza Alaboyun
