= Numan Kurtulmuş =

30th Speaker of the Parliament of Turkey

Numan Kurtulmuş MP
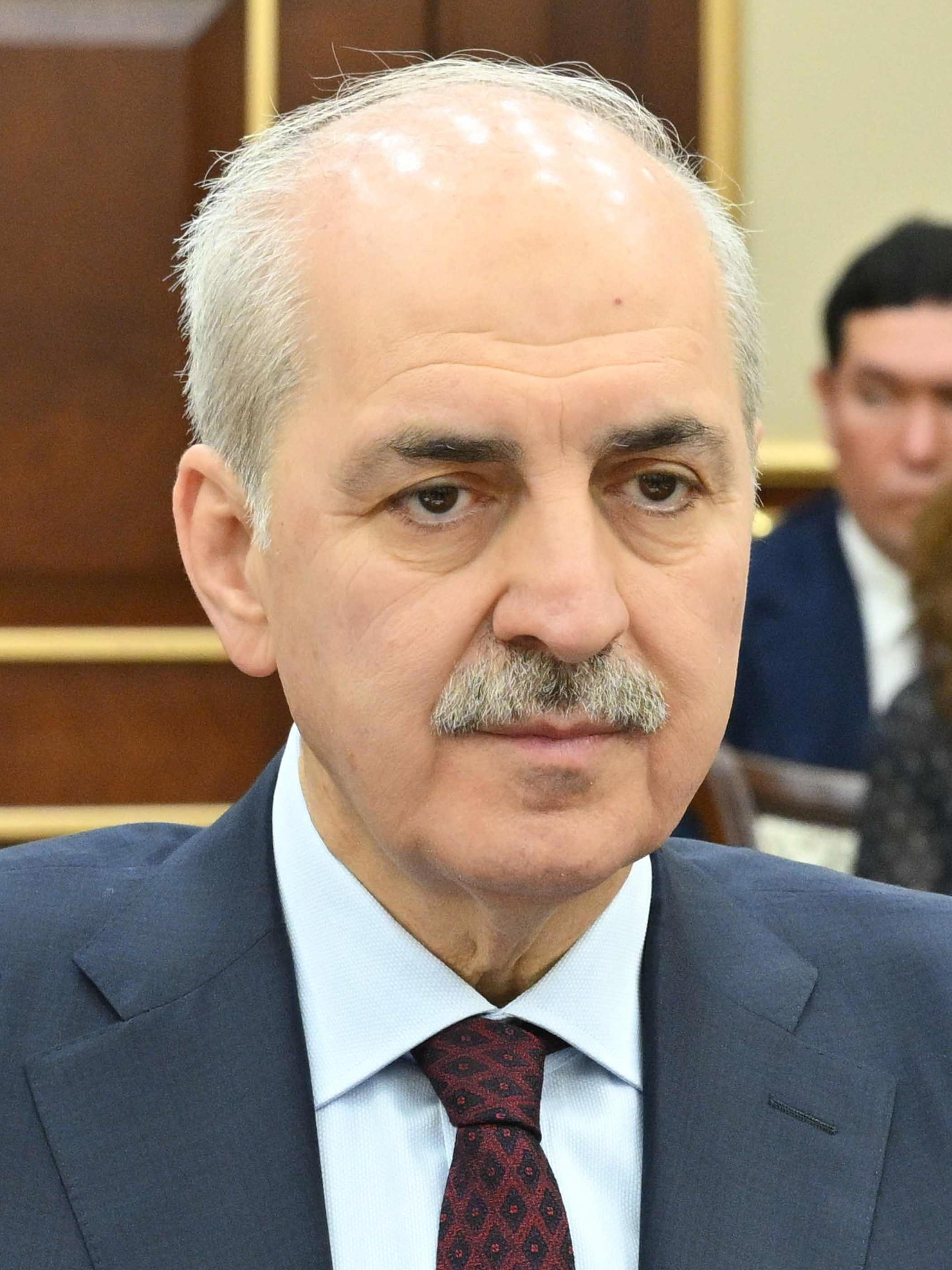
- Kurtulmuş in 2024

30th Speaker of the Grand National Assembly of Turkey
- Incumbent
- Assumed office 7 June 2023
- President: Recep Tayyip Erdoğan
- Deputy: Bekir Bozdağ; Gülizar Biçer Karaca; Celal Adan; Sırrı Süreyya Önder
- Preceded by: Mustafa Şentop

Minister of Culture and Tourism
- In office 19 July 2017 – 10 July 2018
- Prime Minister: Binali Yıldırım
- Preceded by: Nabi Avcı
- Succeeded by: Mehmet Ersoy

Deputy Prime Minister of Turkey
- In office 24 May 2016 – 19 July 2017
- Prime Minister: Binali Yıldırım
- Preceded by: Numan Kurtulmuş
- Succeeded by: Bekir Bozdağ

Member of the Grand National Assembly
- Incumbent
- Assumed office 7 June 2015
- Constituency: Ordu (June 2015, Nov 2015), Istanbul (III) (2018, 2023)

Leader of the People's Voice Party
- In office 1 November 2010 – 19 September 2012
- Preceded by: Position established
- Succeeded by: Position abolished

Leader of the Felicity Party
- In office 26 October 2008 – 17 October 2010
- Preceded by: Recai Kutan
- Succeeded by: Necmettin Erbakan

Personal details
- Born: 15 September 1959 (age 67) Ünye, Ordu, Turkey
- Party: FP (1998–2001); SP (2001–2010); HAS Party (2010–2012); AKP (2012–present)
- Spouse: Sevgi Kurtulmuş (m. 1988)
- Children: 3
- Education: Istanbul University (BA, PhD); Temple University (MA)
- Cabinet: 62nd, 63rd, 64th, 65th
- Website: Official Website

Numan Kurtulmuş (born 15 September 1959) is a Turkish politician and academic who is currently the speaker of the Grand National Assembly.

He served as Deputy Prime Minister of Turkey in the 62nd, 63rd, 64th and 65th AKP governments between 2014 and 2017 and Minister of Culture and Tourism between 2017 and 2018. Previously, he served as the leader of Felicity Party between 2008 and 2010 and People's Voice Party between 2010 and 2012.

== Personal life ==
=== Family ===
Kurtulmuş was born in Ünye district of Ordu Province. He is of Georgian descent through his grandmother. His grandfather, Numan Kurtulmuş, served as a major in the Turkish War of Independence on the Çanakkale, Erzurum, Batumi, and Azerbaijan fronts and fought in the Balkans and the Battle of Sakarya. He is also the author of Faith Commentary, known as the first Turkish religious guide written in the Latin alphabet. His father is Dr. Ismail Niyazi Kurtulmuş. He currently resides in Fatih district of Istanbul with his family.

Kurtulmus married Sevgi Kurtulmuş in 1988, and has 3 children, named Ayşe, İsmail and Emir. He speaks English fluently. He is a fan of Fenerbahçe FC.

=== Education and Academic career ===
Kurtulmuş studied at Istanbul Imam Hatip High School. He received his bachelor's degree in 1982 and his master's degree in 1984 from the Istanbul University Faculty of Business Administration.

He pursued postgraduate studies at the Temple University School of Business & Management in 1988–1989. He was also a visiting researcher at the New York State School of Industrial and Labor Relations at Cornell University between 1990 and 1993.

After being awarded a PhD from Istanbul University in 1992, he became an associate professor in 1994 and then professor in 2004 at the Istanbul University Faculty of Economics. He was the assistant of Sabahattin Zaim, who is known as 'the great professor'.

Kurtulmuş taught politics, labor economics, and human resources management at Istanbul University Faculty of Economics and economics and political communication at Istanbul Commerce University. He also participated as a speaker in symposiums and seminars.

=== Books ===
He is the author of Post-Industrial Transformation and The Japanese Human Resource Management. He published his master's degree thesis and Phd dissertation on Integration of Inventory Management by the Database Approach and The change of Industrial Relations for Terms of Model Human Type.

He authored a book, Bringing Turkey to the Future, on the confused current world with some proposals for a new future via multi-disciplines in 2020.

== Political career ==
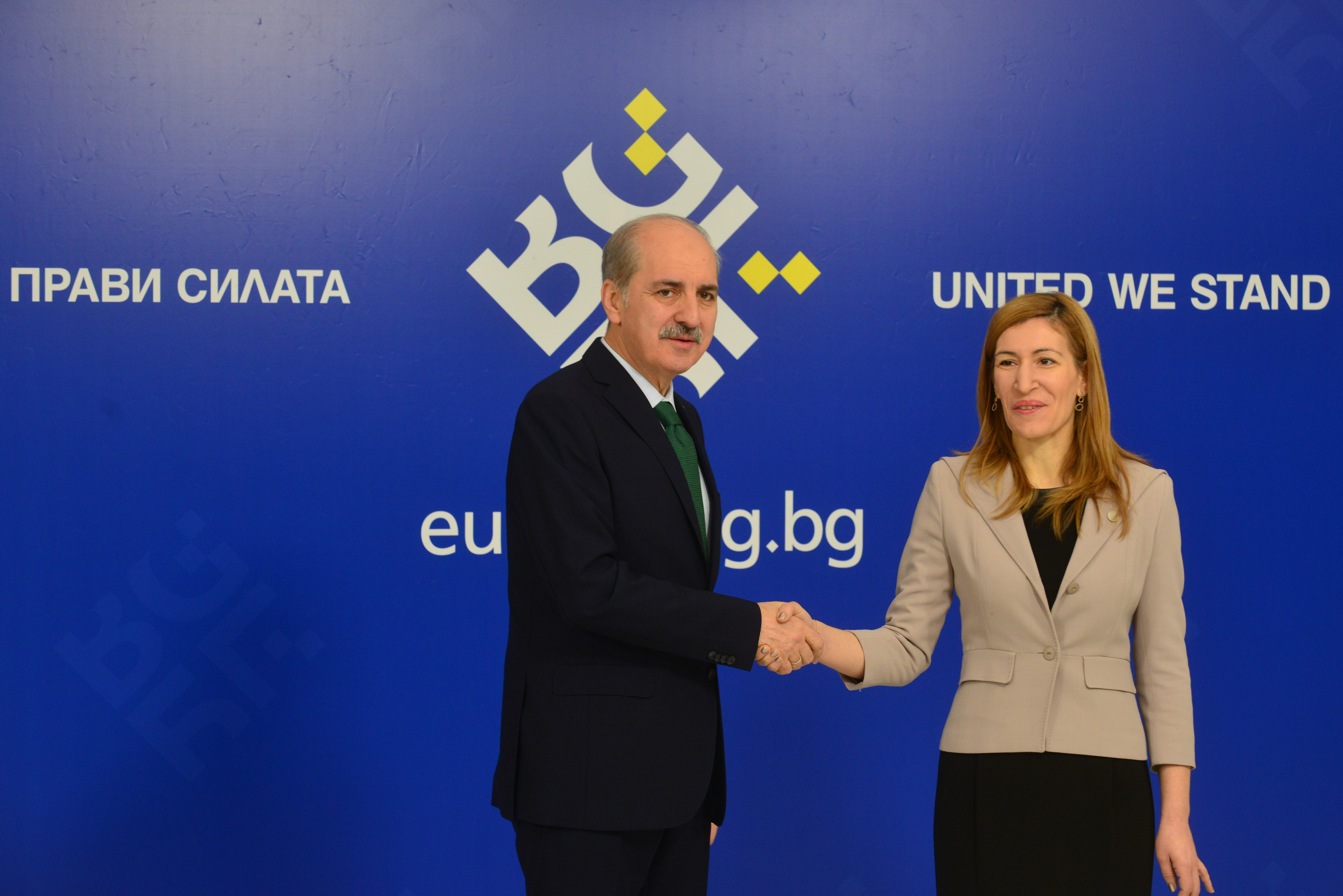
Numan Kurtulmuş meets Minister of Tourism of Bulgaria Nikolina Angelkova, 2018

Kurtulmuş began his political career in 1998 at the Virtue Party. The Virtue Party was banned by the Constitutional Court of Turkey in 2001 and he joined the Felicity Party. He was elected as chairman in 2008 and left the FP following internal disputes in 2010 to establish the People's Voice Party (HAS Party) in the same year. Upon the proposal of Recep Tayyip Erdoğan, AKP and HAS Party united in 2012. This unification led to the dissolution of the HAS Party, at which point Kurtulmuş and many fellow party members then joined the AKP.

=== Virtue Party (1998–2001) ===
In 1998, he began his political career with Necmettin Erbakan and served as the chairman in Istanbul and a Member of the Main Administrative Board. He joined the Felicity Party in 2001 following the disbandment of the Virtue Party.

=== Felicity Party (2001–2010) ===
He served as chairman in Istanbul and Deputy Chairman of Party until 2008 at Felicity Party. Recai Kutan, who was Chairman, announced on 17 October 2008 that Numan Kurtulmuş will be candidate in the party congress to be held in Ankara on 26 October 2008. The slogan was "Felicity Now!" And he was elected as a Chairman of Felicity Party by all valid 924 vote of the used 946 at 3rd Party Congress held in Ankara Atatürk Sports Hall.

In 2010, there was conflict between Kurtulmuş and Necmettin Erbakan who was the leader of the Milli Görüş Movement. Kurtulmuş was re-elected as Chairman of Party, participating as just one candidate of the two lists at the 4th Party Congress held in Ankara on 11 July 2010. He participated in the election of the Main Administrative Board with the white list against Necmettin Erbakan's green list. And the winner white list meant to be kicking Necmettin Erbakan and his friends out.

And then later 650 delegates asked congress again, but this request was rejected by Party's General Administrative Board. Upon the decision appointment of the congress call committee by the court, 53 chairman, 65 mayors and many politician left Felicity Party on 1 October 2010.

Kurtulmuş announced a new political movement, Civilization Politics Movement.

=== People's Voice Party (2010–2012) ===
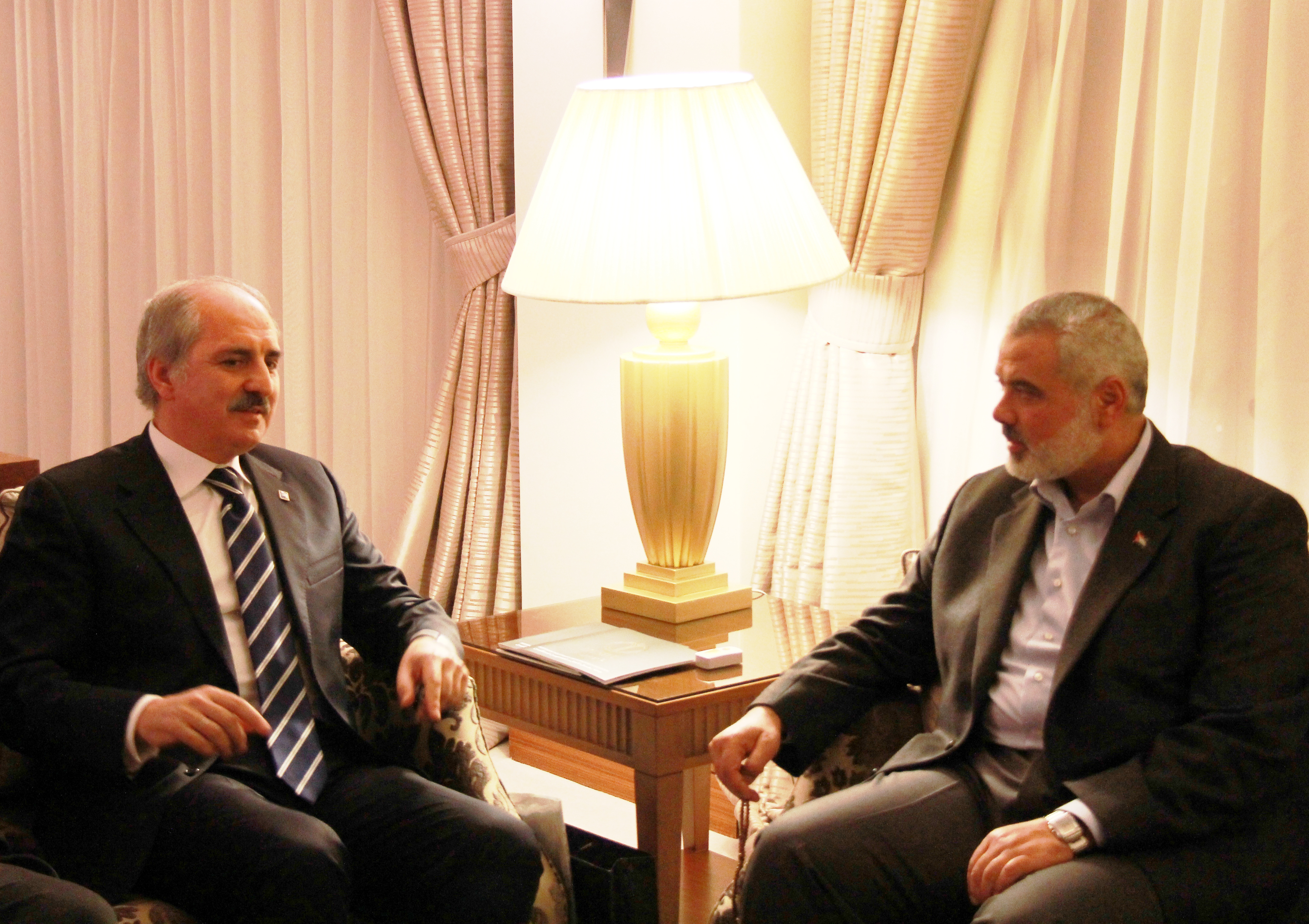
Numan Kurtulmuş meets Prime Minister of Palestine Ismail Haniyeh, 2012

235 politicians who united around Civilization Politics Movement founded the People's Voice Party (HAS Party) on 1 November 2010. Kurtulmuş was elected as chairman of the party by 207 votes of 210 delegates at the 1st party congress held in Ankara Atatürk Sports Hall on 28 November 2010, 28 days after the founding of the HAS Party.

==== Combination process ====
Chairman of AKP and Prime Minister Recep Tayyip Erdoğan offered Kurtulmuş to combine AKP with HAS Party on 12 July 2012. According to the decision taken by the authorized persons of two sides the combination process was started. HAS Party invited the delegates and dissolved itself at the extraordinary congress held on 19 September 2012 by 165 votes of the current 177 delegates according to the decision of combination.

=== Justice and Development Party (2012–Current) ===
After the HAS Party's termination, Kurtulmuş joined AKP at a ceremony held in Istanbul on 22 September 2012 with many people.

Kurtulmuş was elected as a Member of Main Administrative Board at 4th AKP Congress held in Ankara on 30 September 2012, was appointed as vice chairman of party on the economy politics.

When Prime Minister Recep Tayyip Erdoğan was elected as President of Turkey at presidential elections in 2014, Ahmet Davutoğlu replaced himself as a Prime Minister and Kurtulmuş became Deputy Prime Minister at 62nd Government.

Kurtulmuş was elected as the Ordu parliamentarian in the elections of June 2015 and became Deputy Prime Minister and Spokesperson again at the 63rd Government under Ahmet Davutoğlu's Prime Ministry.

Kurtulmuş was elected as the Ordu parliamentarian again in the elections of November 2015, became Deputy Prime Minister and Spokesperson again at 64th Government under Ahmet Davutoğlu's Prime Ministry.

Ahmet Davutoğlu when resigned prime ministry President Erdogan gave the government formation duty to Binali Yıldırım. Kurtulmuş served as deputy prime minister again at 65th Government under Binali Yıldırım's Prime Ministry. After a while held on 19 July 2017 he became Minister of Culture and Tourism in cabinet overhaul.

Kurtulmuş was elected as a parliamentarian of Istanbul on 24 June 2018 and became Deputy chairman of AKP at the 6th party congress, on 18 August 2018.

Kurtulmuş was reelected as an AKP deputy for Istanbul in the 2023 Turkish general election held on May 14, 2023. On 7 June 2023 following three rounds of secret voting, he was elected as the 30th Speaker of the Grand National Assembly, receiving 321 votes in the final round as the joint candidate of the AKP and its ally in the Nationalist Movement Party MHP and succeeded Mustafa Şentop.

On 3 June 2025, Kurtulmuş was reelected as speaker for the second time, receiving 329 votes in the third round of the voting; the MHP did not field a candidate and endorsed him, while the main opposition Republican People's Party and the Peoples' Equality and Democracy Party, ran their own candidates. In his acceptance speech, he named advancing the government's Kurdish–Turkish peace process initiative, an effort that had recently led to the Kurdistan Workers' Party announcing id dissolution as parliament's most urgent task.

Political offices
Preceded by Mustafa Şentop	Speaker of the Parliament; 2023–present	Incumbent
Preceded by Nabi Avcı	Minister of Culture and Tourism; 2017–2018	Succeeded by Mehmet Ersoy
