= Malatya (electoral district) =

Electoral district for the Grand National Assembly of Turkey

Coordinates: 38°30′N 38°00′E

- electoral district for the Grand National Assembly of Turkey
- Malatya shown within Turkey
- Province: Malatya
- Electorate: 503,323

Current electoral district
- Created: 1920
- Seats: 6 Historical: 7 (1995-2011) 6 (1961-1995) 9 (1957-1961) 12 (1954-1957)
- MPs: List: Mahmut Mücahit Fındıklı AKP Mustafa Şahin AKP Öznur Çalık AKP Hüseyin Cemal Akın AKP Ömer Faruk Öz AKP Veli Ağbaba CHP
- Turnout at last election: 87.11%
- Representation
- AK Party: 5 / 6
- CHP: 1 / 6

Malatya is an electoral district of the Grand National Assembly of Turkey. It elects six members of parliament (deputies) to represent the province of the same name for a four-year term by the D'Hondt method, a party-list proportional representation system.

== Members ==
Population reviews of each electoral district are conducted before each general election, which can lead to certain districts being granted a smaller or greater number of parliamentary seats. At the last election Malatya's seat allocation fell to six, having been at seven since 1995.

MPs for Malatya, 1999 onwards
Seat	1999 (21st parliament)	2002 (22nd parliament)	2007 (23rd parliament)	2011 (24th parliament)	June 2015 (25th parliament)
1	Recai Kutan; FP	Ahmet Münir Erkal; AK Party	Mahmut Mücahit Fındıklı; AK Party		Taha Özhan; AK Party
2	Oğuzhan Asiltürk; FP	Fuat Ölmeztoprak; AK Party		Mustafa Şahin; AK Party	
3	Yaşar Canbay; FP	Ali Osman Başkurt; AK Party	Öznur Çalık; AK Party		
4	Miraç Akdoğan; Anavatan	Miraç Akdoğan; AK Party	Mehmet Şahin; AK Party	Hüseyin Cemal Akın; AK Party	Nurettin Yaşar; AK Party
5	Basri Coşkun; MHP	Süleyman Sarıbaş; AK Party	Ömer Faruk Öz; AK Party		Bülent Tüfenkci; AK Party
6	Namık Hakan Durhan; MHP	Ferit Mevlüt Aslanoğlu; CHP		Veli Ağbaba; CHP	
7	Tevfik Ahmet Özal; Independent / Anavatan	Muharrem Kılıç; CHP	İhsan Koca; AK Party	No seat	

== General elections ==
=== 2011 ===
Unelected candidates in small text.

2011 Turkish general election: Malatya
List	Candidates	Votes	Of total (%)	± from prev.
AK Party	Mahmut Mücahit Fındıklı, Mustafa Şahin, Öznur Çalık, Hüseyin Cemal Akın, Ömer Faruk Öz	294,645	67.99	
CHP	Veli Ağbaba	85,646	19.76	
MHP	None elected	35,293	8.14	
Independent	None elected	5474	1.26	
HAS Party	None elected	4120	0.95	N/A
SAADET	None elected	3301	0.76	
Büyük Birlik	None elected	1980	0.46	
DP	None elected	1378	0.32	
MP	None elected	415	0.10	
DSP	None elected	348	0.08	'"`UNIQ−−ref−0000000D−QINU`"'
TKP	None elected	304	0.07	
DYP	None elected	291	0.07	
Nationalist Conservative	None elected	182	0.04	
HEPAR	None elected	0		
Liberal Democrat	None elected	0		
Labour	None elected	0		
Turnout		433,377	87.11	

=== June 2015 ===
Abbr.	Party	Votes	%
AKP	Justice and Development Party	257,512	58.6%
CHP	Republican People's Party	72,917	16.6%
MHP	Nationalist Movement Party	50,091	11.4%
HDP	Peoples' Democratic Party	34,765	7.9%
	Other	24,018	5.5%
Total		439,303	
Turnout		84.30	
source: YSK

=== November 2015 ===
Abbr.	Party	Votes	%
AKP	Justice and Development Party	309,173	67.9%
CHP	Republican People's Party	69,808	15.3%
MHP	Nationalist Movement Party	42,138	9.3%
HDP	Peoples' Democratic Party	25,584	5.6%
	Other	8,781	1.9%
Total		455,484	
Turnout		86.34	
source: YSK

=== 2018 ===
Abbr.	Party	Votes	%
AKP	Justice and Development Party	254,970	53.3%
CHP	Republican People's Party	79,605	16.6%
MHP	Nationalist Movement Party	77,413	16.2%
HDP	Peoples' Democratic Party	32,081	6.7%
IYI	Good Party	20,347	4.3%
	Other	14,270	3%
Total		478,686	
Turnout		87.72	
source: YSK

== Presidential elections ==
=== 2014 ===
Presidential Election 2014: Malatya
Party	Candidate	Votes	%
AK Party	Recep Tayyip Erdoğan	285,388	70.27
Independent	Ekmeleddin İhsanoğlu	99,113	24.40
HDP	Selahattin Demirtaş	21,633	5.33
Total votes		406,134	100.00
Rejected ballots		6,278	1.52
Turnout		412,412	78.16
Recep Tayyip Erdoğan win			
