= Ministry of National Defence (Turkey) =

Government ministry of the Republic of Turkey

- Millî Savunma Bakanlığı
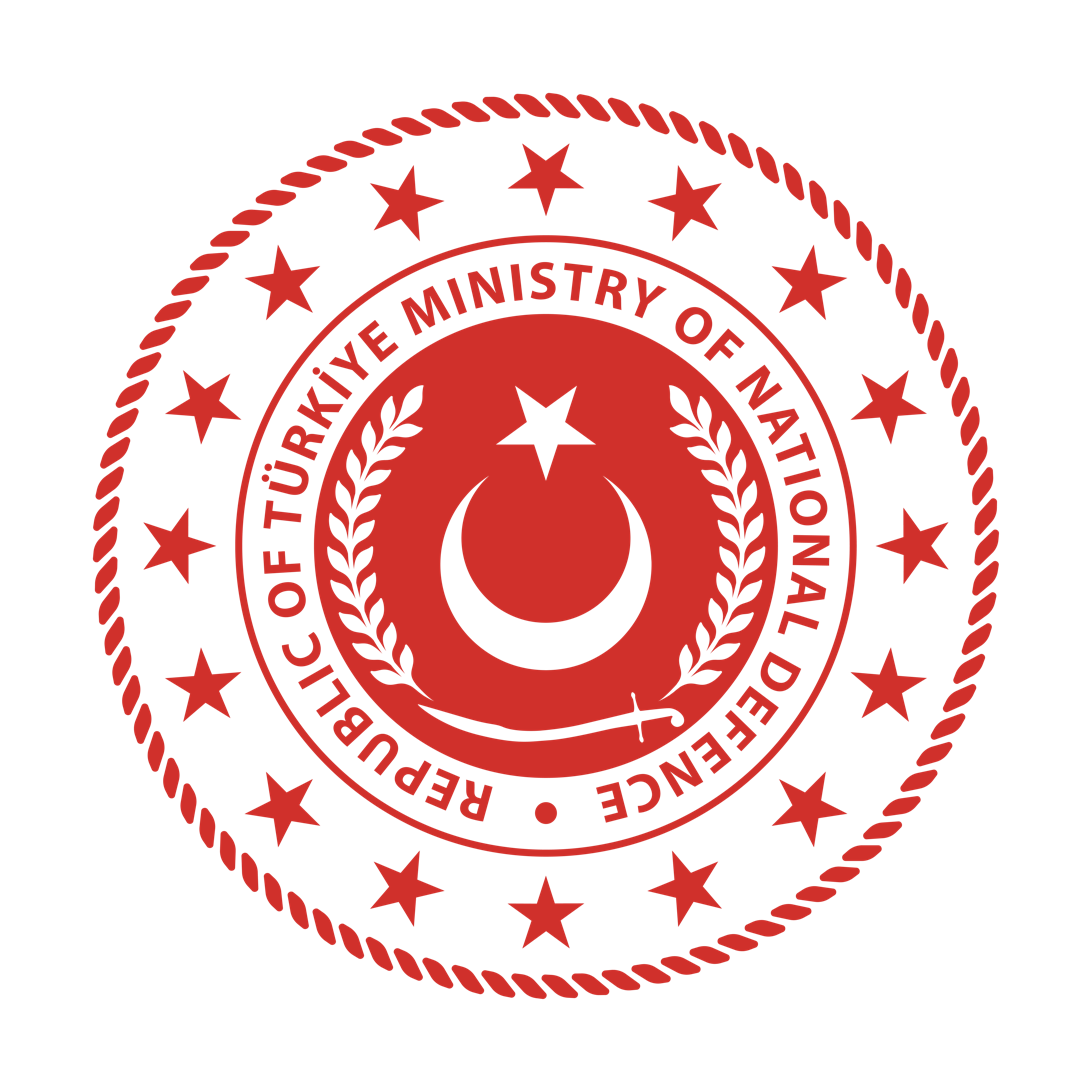

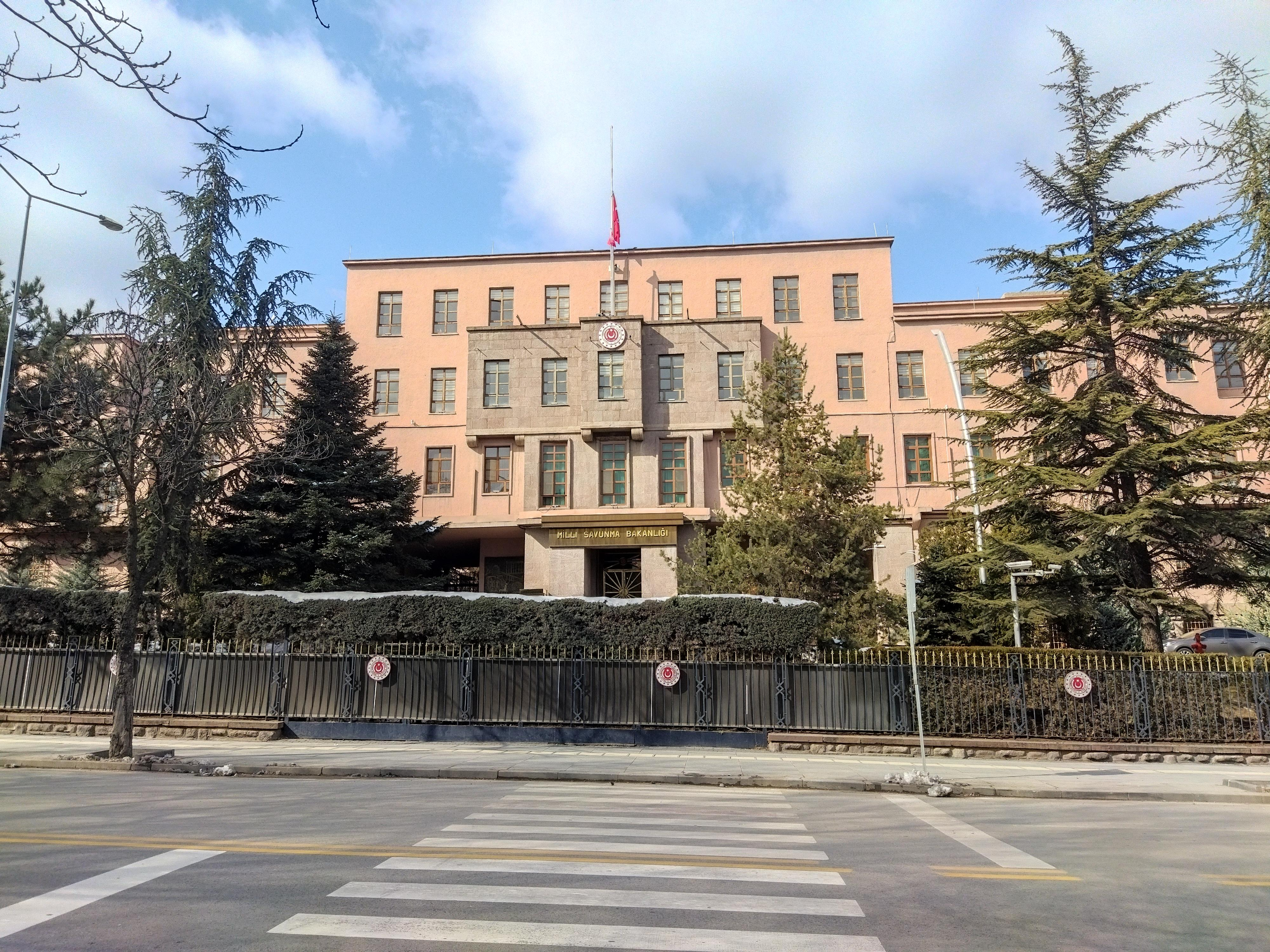
- Headquarters building in Çankaya

Ministry overview
- Formed: 1920; 106 years ago
- Jurisdiction: Government of Türkiye
- Headquarters: Bakanlıklar, Ankara, Turkey
- Employees: 38,062 civilian staff 332,150 military personnel
- Annual budget: $26,6 billion
- Minister responsible: Yaşar Güler
- Deputy Ministers responsible: Alpaslan Kavaklıoğlu; Bilal Durdalı; Musa Heybet; Şuay Alpay
- Website: www.msb.gov.tr

The Ministry of National Defence (Turkish: Millî Savunma Bakanlığı) is a cabinet-level agency of the Government of Turkey responsible for managing the Turkish Armed Forces and its supportive defence establishments to safeguard the country against external threats. It is the fourth biggest employer in Turkey with a total count of 370,000 personnel.

== Organization ==
Minister of National Defence

- Office of the Private Secretary
- Office of Press and Public Relations
- Inspection Board
- National Defense University
- Deputy Minister
  - Directorate General of Personnel
  - Directorate General of Defence and Safety
  - Directorate General of Administrative Services
  - Directorate General of Procurement Services
  - Department of Communications and Information Systems
  - ASFAT A.Ş.
- Deputy Minister
  - Internal Audit Unit
  - Directorate General of Legal Services
  - National Mine Action Centre
  - Directorate General of Mapping
  - Fuel Supply and NATO POL Facilities Operating Agency
- Deputy Minister
  - Directorate General of Conscription
  - Directorate General of Budget and Financial Services
  - Directorate General of Logistics
  - Directorate General of Military Health Services
  - Mechanical and Chemical Industry Corporation
- Deputy Minister
  - Defence Industry Agency
  - Directorate General of Shipyards
  - Directorate General of Technical Services
- Turkish Armed Forces
  - General Staff of the Turkish Armed Forces
  - Turkish Land Forces
  - Turkish Naval Forces
  - Turkish Air Force

Note: Land, Naval and Air Forces reports directly to the Minister of National Defence.
