= Deputy Prime Minister of Turkey =

Abolished official deputy of the head of government of the Republic of Turkey

Deputy Prime Minister of Republic of Turkey
- Türkiye Cumhuriyeti Başbakan Yardımcısı
- Seal of the Prime Ministry
- Type: Deputy head of government
- Status: Abolished
- Appointer: Prime Minister of Turkey
- Term length: No term limit
- Inaugural holder: Mümtaz Ökmen
- Formation: 7 August 1946
- Abolished: 9 July 2018
- Superseded by: Vice President
- Website: basbakanlik.gov.tr

The deputy prime minister of Turkey was official deputy of the prime minister of Turkey. Conventionally all of the junior partners in a coalition got one deputy, and they were ranked according to the size of their respective parties.

== See also ==
- Prime Minister of Turkey
- List of deputy prime ministers of Turkey
- Vice President of Turkey
