= Premiership of Recep Tayyip Erdoğan =

Turkey primership administration from 2003 to 2014

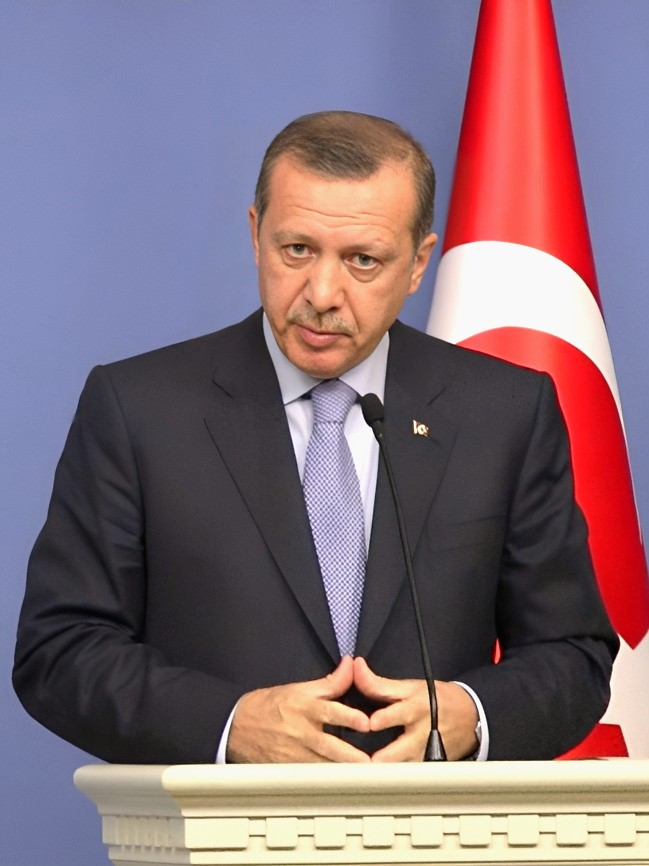
- Premiership of Recep Tayyip Erdoğan; March 14, 2003 – August 28, 2014
- President: Ahmet Necdet Sezer (2000–2007); Abdullah Gül (2007–2014)
- Prime Minister: Recep Tayyip Erdoğan
- Cabinet: Cabinet Erdoğan I Cabinet Erdoğan II; Cabinet Erdoğan III
- Party: Justice and Development Party
- Election: 2002, 2007, 2011
- Appointed by: Ahmet Necdet Sezer; Abdullah Gül
- Seat: Başbakanlık Konutu
- Seal of the Prime Minister

The premiership of Recep Tayyip Erdoğan began on March 14, 2003, when the first Cabinet headed by Erdoğan was sworn in by the Turkish Parliament.

== Elections ==
=== 2002 general elections ===
The AKP won a sweeping victory in the 2002 elections, which saw every party previously represented in the Grand National Assembly ejected from the chamber. In the process, it won a two-thirds majority of seats, becoming the first Turkish party in 11 years to win an outright majority. Erdoğan, as the leader of the biggest party in parliament, would have been normally given the task to form a cabinet. However, according to the Turkish Constitution Article 109 the Prime Ministers had to be also a representative of the Turkish Parliament. Erdoğan, who was banned from holding any political office after a 1994 incident in which he read a poem deemed pro-Islamist by judges, was therefore not. As a result, Gül became prime minister. It survived the crisis over the 2003 invasion of Iraq despite a massive back bench rebellion where over a hundred AKP MPs joined those of the opposition Republican People's Party (CHP) in parliament to prevent the government from allowing the United States to launch a Northern offensive in Iraq from Turkish territory. Later, Erdoğan's ban was abolished with the help of the CHP and Erdoğan became prime minister by being selected to parliament after a by-election in Siirt.

The AKP has undertaken structural reforms, and during its rule Turkey has seen rapid growth and an end to its three decade long period of high inflation rates. Inflation had fallen to 8.8% by 2004.

=== 2007 elections ===
On April 14, 2007, an estimated 300,000 people marched in Ankara to protest the possible candidacy of Erdoğan in the 2007 presidential election, afraid that if elected as president, he would alter the secular nature of the Turkish state. Erdoğan announced on April 24, 2007, that the party had decided to nominate Abdullah Gül as the AKP candidate in the presidential election.

Early parliamentary elections were called after the failure of the parties in parliament to agree on the next Turkish president. The opposition parties boycotted the parliamentary vote and deadlocked the election process. At the same time, Erdoğan claimed the failure to elect a president was a failure of the Turkish political system and proposed to modify the constitution.

The AKP achieved victory in the rescheduled July 22, 2007 elections with 46.6% of the vote, translating into control of 341 of the 550 available parliamentary seats. Although the AKP received significantly more votes in 2007 than in 2002, the number of parliamentary seats they controlled decreased due to the rules of the Turkish electoral system. However, they retained a comfortable ruling majority. "No Stopping, Push On!" was the slogan of the Justice and Development Party in the general elections of 2007.

Territorially, the elections of 2007 saw a major advance for the AKP, with the party outpolling the pro-Kurdish Democratic Society Party in traditional Kurdish strongholds such as Van and Mardin, as well as outpolling the secular-left CHP in traditionally secular areas such as Antalya and Artvin. Overall, the AKP secured a plurality of votes in 68 of Turkey's 81 provinces, with its strongest vote of 71% coming from Bingöl. Its weakest vote, a mere 12%, came from Tunceli, the only Turkish province where the Alevi form a majority. Abdullah Gül was elected president in late August with 339 votes in the third round – the first at which a simple majority is required – after deadlock in the first two rounds, in which a two-thirds majority is needed.

=== 2011 elections ===
The 2011 elections was the last election Erdogan attended as a prime minister. The result of the elections was a third consecutive victory for the incumbent Justice and Development Party (AKP), with its leader Recep Tayyip Erdoğan being re-elected as Prime Minister for a third term with 49.8% of the vote and 327 MPs. This represented an increase of 3.2% since the 2007 Turkish general election and an 11.4% rise since the 2009 Turkish local elections. The victory was attributed to the strong sustained economic recovery after the Great Recession as well as the completion of several projects such as the İzmir commuter railway, inter-city high speed rail lines and airports in Amasya, Gökçeada and Gazipaşa (Antalya).

=== Electoral fraud ===
Erdoğan's government developed the SEÇSİS secure vote counting system ostensibly in order to reduce fraud. However, it has been criticised for being prone to manipulation. Particular controversy was generated by the fact that the system was developed in the United States.

The first significant cases of election fraud under Erdoğan's rule were documented during the 2009 local elections, where numerous cases of ballot paper theft were reported in Ankara and Adana.

In the 2011 general election, a minivan containing ballot papers with a pre-stamped vote for the AKP was impounded by police in İzmir. An independent candidate from Yalova also accused officials at polling stations of intimidating voters to vote for the AKP.

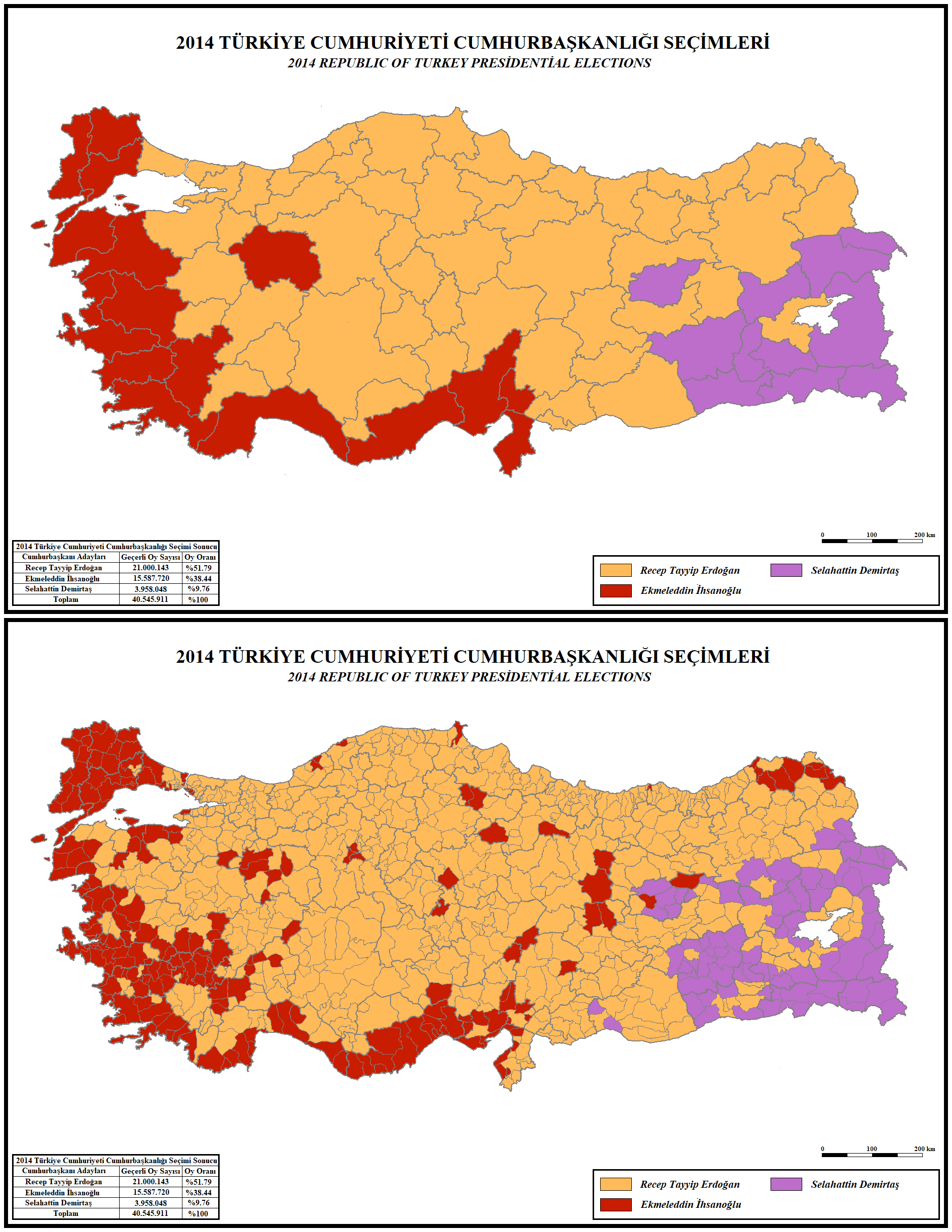
2014 presidential election results.

Substantial levels of fraud were documented during the 2014 local elections, including the theft and burning of ballots cast both for and against the AKP and the intimidation of officials counting the votes, including European Union Minister Mevlüt Çavuşoğlu, by government forces. Several cases of opposition votes being counted as invalid and vote totals per ballot box being recorded incorrectly also caused controversy. With an unusually high number of power outages occurring throughout the country while votes were being counted, the government was ridiculed when Energy Minister Taner Yıldız blamed them on cats entering transformers. Erdoğan was criticised for disregarding the high number of fraud cases and declaring victory none-the-less. Significant cases of misconduct were documented in Yalova, Ankara, Antalya and Ağrı. The Supreme Electoral Council ordered a repeat of the election in Yalova and Ağrı, both of which the AKP had initially narrowly lost to the CHP and BDP respectively.

Despite strong surveillance by citizens during the 2014 presidential election, no serious cases of fraud were documented during the voting or counting process. However, Erdoğan was still heavily scrutinised over what was perceived to be excessive media bias in his favour during the campaigning process.

On 14 June 2018, in a video that was leaked to the public, President Erdogan is caught calling his party members to resort to electoral fraud, by "marking" the votes of an opposition party, HDP, in a bid to consolidate a better position for his own party at the 2018 June elections in Turkey.

== Cabinets ==
=== First cabinet ===
The first cabinet of Erdogan took office on 14 March 2003. He succeeded to the government Gul, who was in office since 18 November 2002.

Functions		Holder	Start	End
English title	Turkish title	Holder	Start	End
Prime Minister	Başbakan	Recep Tayyip Erdoğan	14 March 2003	28 August 2007
Deputy Prime Minister	Başbakan Yardımcısı	Abdullah Gül	14 March 2003	28 August 2007
Ministry of Foreign Affairs	Dışişleri Bakanı	Abdullah Gül	14 March 2003	28 August 2007
Deputy Prime Minister	Başbakan Yardımcısı	Mehmet Ali Şahin	14 March 2003	28 August 2007
Deputy Prime Minister	Başbakan Yardımcısı	Abdüllatif Şener	14 March 2003	28 August 2007
Minister of State	Devlet Bakanı	Ali Babacan	14 March 2003	28 August 2007
Minister of State	Devlet Bakanı	Nimet Çubukçu	14 March 2003	28 August 2007
Minister of State	Devlet Bakanı	Mehmet Aydın	14 March 2003	28 August 2007
Minister of State	Devlet Bakanı	Kürşad Tüzmen	14 March 2003	28 August 2007
Minister of State	Devlet Bakanı	Beşir Atalay	14 March 2003	28 August 2007
Ministry of Justice	Adalet Bakanı	Cemil Çiçek	14 March 2003	8 May 2007
Ministry of National Defense	Millî Savunma Bakanı	Mehmet Vecdi Gönül	14 March 2003	28 August 2007
Ministry of the Interior	İçişleri Bakanı	Abdülkadir Aksu	14 March 2003	8 May 2007
Ministry of Finance	Maliye Bakanı	Kemal Unakıtan	14 March 2003	28 August 2007
Ministry of National Education	Millî Eğitim Bakanı	Hüseyin Çelik	14 March 2003	28 August 2007
Ministry of Public Works and Settlement	Bayındırlık ve İskân Bakanı	Faruk Nafız Özak	14 March 2003	28 August 2007
Ministry of Health	Sağlık Bakanı	Recep Akdağ	14 March 2003	28 August 2007
Ministry of Transport and Communication	Ulaştırma Bakanı	Binali Yıldırım	14 March 2003	8 May 2007
Ministry of Agriculture	Tarım ve Köyişleri Bakanı	Mehmet Mehdi Eker	14 March 2003	28 August 2007
Ministry of Labour and Social Security	Çalışma ve Sosyal Güvenlik Bakanı	Murat Başesgioğlu	14 March 2003	28 August 2007
Ministry of Industry and Commerce	Sanayi ve Ticaret Bakanı	Ali Coşkun	14 March 2003	28 August 2007
Ministry of Energy and Natural Resources	Enerji ve Tabii Kaynaklar Bakanı	Mehmet Hilmi Güler	14 March 2003	28 August 2007
Ministry of Culture and Tourism	Kültür ve Turizm Bakanı	Atilla Koç	14 March 2003	28 August 2007
Ministry of Environment and Forestry	Çevre ve Orman Bakanı	Osman Pepe	14 March 2003	28 August 2007

=== Second cabinet ===
The second cabinet of Erdogan was active between 29 August 2007 and 14 June 2011.

Functions		Holder	Start	End
English title	Turkish title	Holder	Start	End
Prime Minister	Başbakan	Recep Tayyip Erdoğan	29 August 2007	14 June 2011
Deputy Prime Minister; Minister of State; Responsible for Inter-ministerial Coordination, Human Rights and Cyprus	Başbakan Yardımcısı; Devlet Bakanı	Cemil Çiçek	29 August 2007	14 June 2011
Deputy Prime Minister; Minister of State; Responsible for Foundations and TRT	Başbakan Yardımcısı; Devlet Bakanı	Hayati Yazıcı	29 August 2007	1 May 2009
Deputy Prime Minister; Minister of State; Responsible for Foundations and TRT	Başbakan Yardımcısı; Devlet Bakanı	Bülent Arınç	1 May 2009	14 June 2011
Deputy Prime Minister; Minister of State; Responsible for the Economy, Banking and Treasury	Başbakan Yardımcısı; Devlet Bakanı	Nazım Ekren	29 August 2007	1 May 2009
Deputy Prime Minister; Minister of State; Responsible for the Economy, Banking and Treasury	Başbakan Yardımcısı; Devlet Bakanı	Ali Babacan	1 May 2009	14 June 2011
Minister of State; Responsible for Information Technology and the Alliance of Civilizations	Devlet Bakanı	Mehmet Aydın	29 August 2007	14 June 2011
Minister of State; Responsible of Foreign Trade	Devlet Bakanı	Kürşad Tüzmen	29 August 2007	1 May 2009
Minister of State; Responsible of Foreign Trade	Devlet Bakanı	Mehmet Zafer Çağlayan	1 May 2009	14 June 2011
Minister of State; Responsible for Women and Family	Devlet Bakanı	Nimet Çubukçu	29 August 2007	1 May 2009
Minister of State; Responsible for Women and Family	Devlet Bakanı	Selma Aliye Kavaf	1 May 2009	14 June 2011
Minister of State; Responsible of the Southeastern Anatolia Project	Devlet Bakanı	Cevdet Yılmaz	1 May 2009	14 June 2011
Minister of State; Responsible for Religious Affairs and the Turkish World	Devlet Bakanı	Mustafa Sait Yazıcıoğlu	29 August 2007	1 May 2009
Minister of State; Responsible for Religious Affairs and the Turkish World	Devlet Bakanı	Faruk Çelik	1 May 2009	14 June 2011
Minister of State; Responsible for Youth and Sports	Devlet Bakanı	Murat Başesgioğlu	29 August 2007	1 May 2009
Minister of State; Responsible for Youth and Sports	Devlet Bakanı	Faruk Nafız Özak	1 May 2009	14 June 2011
Minister of State; Chief Negotiator with the European Union	Devlet Bakanı	Egemen Bağış	8 January 2009	14 June 2011
Minister of State; Responsible for Customs, Istanbul 2010 and Social Protection	Devlet Bakanı	Hayati Yazıcı	1 May 2009	14 June 2011
Ministry of Foreign Affairs	Dışişleri Bakanı	Ali Babacan	29 August 2007	1 May 2009
Ministry of Foreign Affairs	Dışişleri Bakanı	Ahmet Davutoğlu	1 May 2009	14 June 2011
Ministry of the Interior	İçişleri Bakanı	Beşir Atalay	29 August 2007	8 March 2011
Ministry of Finance	Maliye Bakanı	Kemal Unakıtan	29 August 2007	1 May 2009
Ministry of Finance	Maliye Bakanı	Mehmet Şimşek	1 May 2009	14 June 2011
Ministry of Justice	Adalet Bakanı	Mehmet Ali Şahin	29 August 2007	1 May 2009
Ministry of Justice	Adalet Bakanı	Sadullah Ergin	1 May 2009	8 March 2011
Ministry of Energy and Natural Resources	Enerji ve Tabii Kaynaklar Bakanı	Hilmi Güler	29 August 2007	1 May 2009
Ministry of Energy and Natural Resources	Enerji ve Tabii Kaynaklar Bakanı	Taner Yıldız	1 May 2009	14 June 2011
Ministry of Agriculture	Tarım ve Köyişleri Bakanı	Mehmet Mehdi Eker	29 August 2007	14 June 2011
Ministry of Culture and Tourism	Kültür ve Turizm Bakanı	Ertuğrul Günay	29 August 2007	14 June 2011
Ministry of Health	Sağlık Bakanı	Recep Akdağ	29 August 2007	14 June 2011
Ministry of National Education	Millî Eğitim Bakanı	Hüseyin Çelik	29 August 2007	1 May 2009
Ministry of National Education	Millî Eğitim Bakanı	Nimet Çubukçu	1 May 2009	14 June 2011
Ministry of National Defense	Millî Savunma Bakanı	Vecdi Gönül	29 August 2007	14 June 2011
Ministry of Industry and Commerce	Sanayi ve Ticaret Bakanı	Mehmet Zafer Çağlayan	29 August 2007	1 May 2009
Ministry of Industry and Commerce	Sanayi ve Ticaret Bakanı	Nihat Ergün	1 May 2009	14 June 2011
Ministry of Labour and Social Security	Çalışma ve Sosyal Güvenlik Bakanı	Faruk Çelik	29 August 2007	1 May 2009
Ministry of Labour and Social Security	Çalışma ve Sosyal Güvenlik Bakanı	Ömer Dinçer	1 May 2009	14 June 2011
Ministry of Transport and Communication	Ulaştırma Bakanı	Binali Yıldırım	29 August 2007	8 March 2011
Ministry of Public Works and Settlement	Bayındırlık ve İskân Bakanı	Faruk Nafız Özak	29 August 2007	1 May 2009
Ministry of Public Works and Settlement	Bayındırlık ve İskân Bakanı	Mustafa Demir	1 May 2009	14 June 2011
Ministry of Environment and Forestry	Çevre ve Orman Bakanı	Veysel Eroğlu	29 August 2007	14 June 2011

=== Third cabinet ===
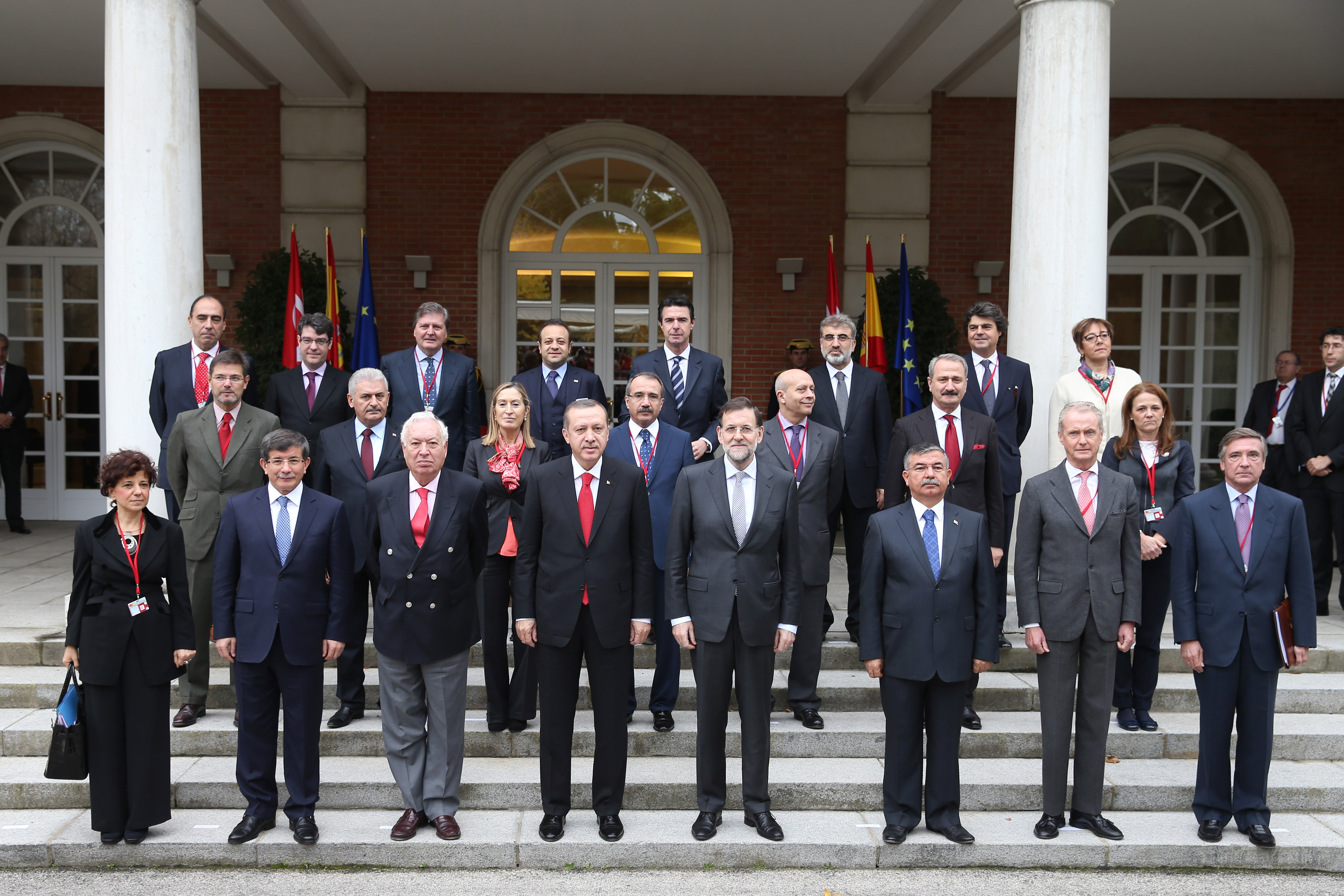
Cabinets from Spain and Turkey met for a working visit

The third cabinet of Erdogan was active between 2011 and 2014.

Functions		Holder	Start	End
English title	Turkish title	Holder	Start	End
Prime Minister	Başbakan	Recep Tayyip Erdoğan	6 July 2011	28 August 2014
Deputy Prime Minister; Responsible for Foundations and TRT	Başbakan Yardımcısı	Bülent Arınç	6 July 2011	29 August 2014
Deputy Prime Minister; Responsible for Religious Affairs and the Turkish World	Başbakan Yardımcısı	Bekir Bozdağ	6 July 2011	25 December 2013
Deputy Prime Minister; Responsible for Religious Affairs and the Turkish World	Başbakan Yardımcısı	Emrullah İşler	25 December 2013	29 August 2014
Deputy Prime Minister; Responsible for the Economy, Banking and Treasury	Başbakan Yardımcısı	Ali Babacan	6 July 2011	29 August 2014
Deputy Prime Minister; Responsible for Counter-terrorism, Human Rights and Cyprus	Başbakan Yardımcısı	Beşir Atalay	6 July 2011	29 August 2014
Ministry of Foreign Affairs	Dışişleri Bakanı	Ahmet Davutoğlu	6 July 2011	29 August 2014
Ministry of the Interior	İçişleri Bakanı	İdris Naim Şahin	6 July 2011	24 January 2013
Ministry of the Interior	İçişleri Bakanı	Muammer Güler	24 January 2013	25 December 2013
Ministry of the Interior	İçişleri Bakanı	Efkan Ala	25 December 2013	29 August 2014
Ministry of Finance	Maliye Bakanı	Mehmet Şimşek	6 July 2011	29 August 2014
Ministry of Justice	Adalet Bakanı	Sadullah Ergin	6 July 2011	25 December 2013
Ministry of Justice	Adalet Bakanı	Bekir Bozdağ	25 December 2013	29 August 2014
Ministry of Energy and Natural Resources	Enerji ve Tabii Kaynaklar Bakanı	Taner Yıldız	6 July 2011	29 August 2014
Ministry of Food, Agriculture and Livestock	Gıda, Tarım ve Hayvancılık Bakanı	Mehmet Mehdi Eker	6 July 2011	29 August 2014
Ministry of Culture and Tourism	Kültür ve Turizm Bakanı	Ertuğrul Günay	6 July 2011	24 January 2013
Ministry of Culture and Tourism	Kültür ve Turizm Bakanı	Ömer Çelik	24 January 2013	29 August 2014
Ministry of Health	Sağlık Bakanı	Recep Akdağ	6 July 2011	24 January 2013
Ministry of Health	Sağlık Bakanı	Mehmet Müezzinoğlu	24 January 2013	29 August 2014
Ministry of National Education	Millî Eğitim Bakanı	Ömer Dinçer	6 July 2011	24 January 2013
Ministry of National Education	Millî Eğitim Bakanı	Nabi Avcı	24 January 2013	29 August 2014
Ministry of National Defence	Millî Savunma Bakanı	İsmet Yılmaz	6 July 2011	29 August 2014
Ministry of Science, Industry and Technology	Bilim, Sanayi ve Teknoloji Bakanı	Nihat Ergün	6 July 2011	25 December 2013
Ministry of Science, Industry and Technology	Bilim, Sanayi ve Teknoloji Bakanı	Fikri Işık	25 December 2013	29 August 2014
Ministry of Labour and Social Security	Çalışma ve Sosyal Güvenlik Bakanı	Faruk Çelik	6 July 2011	29 August 2014
Ministry of Transport, Maritime and Communication	Ulaştırma, Denizcilik ve Haberleşme Bakanı	Binali Yıldırım	6 July 2011	25 December 2013
Ministry of Transport, Maritime and Communication	Ulaştırma, Denizcilik ve Haberleşme Bakanı	Lütfi Elvan	25 December 2013	29 August 2014
Ministry of Family and Social Policy	Aile ve Sosyal Politikalar Bakanı	Fatma Şahin	6 July 2011	25 December 2013
Ministry of Family and Social Policy	Aile ve Sosyal Politikalar Bakanı	Ayşenur İslam	25 December 2013	29 August 2014
Ministry of European Union Affairs	Avrupa Birliği Bakanı	Egemen Bağış	6 July 2011	25 December 2013
Ministry of European Union Affairs	Avrupa Birliği Bakanı	Mevlüt Çavuşoğlu	25 December 2013	29 August 2014
Ministry of Economy	Ekonomi Bakanı	Zafer Çağlayan	6 July 2011	25 December 2013
Ministry of Economy	Ekonomi Bakanı	Nihat Zeybekçi	25 December 2013	29 August 2014
Ministry of Youth and Sports	Gençlik ve Spor Bakanı	Suat Kılıç	6 July 2011	25 December 2013
Ministry of Youth and Sports	Gençlik ve Spor Bakanı	Akif Çağatay Kılıç	25 December 2013	29 August 2014
Ministry of Development	Kalkınma Bakanı	Cevdet Yılmaz	6 July 2011	29 August 2014
Ministry of Customs and Trade	Gümrük ve Ticaret Bakanı	Hayati Yazıcı	6 July 2011	29 August 2014
Ministry of Environment and Urban Planning	Çevre ve Şehircilik Bakanı	Erdoğan Bayraktar	6 July 2011	25 December 2013
Ministry of Environment and Urban Planning	Çevre ve Şehircilik Bakanı	İdris Güllüce	25 December 2013	29 August 2014
Ministry of Forest and Water Management	Orman ve Su İşleri Bakanı	Veysel Eroğlu	6 July 2011	29 August 2014

== Domestic policy ==
=== Democracy ===
Erdogan's pro-EU government instituted several democratic reforms such as giving the European Court of Human Rights supremacy over Turkish courts, diminishing the powers of the 1991 Anti-Terror Law which had constrained Turkey’s democratization, and passing a partial amnesty to reduce penalties faced by many members of the Kurdish terrorist organization PKK who had surrendered to the government.

The government planned several times to reform the Turkish Constitution of 1982 in a more democratic "civil constitution", but the main opposition party CHP did not want to participate.

In 2009, the Turkish government under Prime Minister Erdogan announced a plan to help end the quarter-century-long conflict that has cost more than 40,000 lives. The government's plan, supported by the European Union, allowed the Kurdish language to be used in all broadcast media and political campaigns, and restore Kurdish names to cities and towns that have been given Turkish ones.

Such measures, many of which have been required for entry to the European Union, were inconceivable in the early 1980s, when aggressive state policies prohibited use of the Kurdish language and other cultural and political rights for the Kurds.

“We took a courageous step to resolve chronic issues that constitute an obstacle along Turkey’s development, progression and empowerment.” Erdogan said regarding the issue.

=== Economy ===
In 2002, Erdogan inherited a Turkish economy deep in recession due to the financial crisis of Ecevit's coalition government. Erdogan supported Finance Minister Ali Babacan in enforcing macro-economic policies. Erdogan tried to attract more foreign investors to Turkey and lifted most of government regulations, with the average GDP growth rate 7.3% during his premiership. The public debt as percentage of annual gross domestic product declined from 74% in 2002 to 39% in 2009.

=== Justice ===
In March 2006, the Supreme Board of Judges and Prosecutors (HSYK) for the first time in Turkey's history held a press conference and publicly protest the obstruction of the appointment of judges to the high courts for over 10 months. It claimed Erdogan wanted to fill the vacant posts with his own appointees which Erdoğan was accused of creating a rift with the Turkey's highest court of appeals (the Yargitay) and high administrative court (the Danıştay). Erdogan claimed that the constitution gave power of assigning members to his elected party.

In May 2007, the head of the top court in Turkey has asked prosecutors to consider whether Erdogan should be charged over critical comments regarding the election of Abdullah Gul as president. Erdoğan said the ruling was "a disgrace to the justice system", and criticized the Constitutional Court which had invalidated a presidential vote because a boycott of other parties meant there was no quorum. Prosecutors have already investigated his earlier comments, including saying it had fired a "bullet at democracy". Tülay Tuğcu, head of the Constitutional Court, condemned Erdoğan for "threats, insults and hostility" towards the justice system.

The Turkish parliament agreed to reduce the age of candidacy to the parliament from 30 to 25 and abolished the death penalty in all instances, including war time.

=== Health ===
In April 2006, Erdoğan unveiled a social security reform package demanded by the International Monetary Fund under a loan deal. Erdoğan claimed that the move, which was passed with fierce opposition, was one of the most radical reforms. Turkey's three social security bodies were united under one roof, bringing equal health services and retirement benefits for members of all three bodies. Under the second bill, everyone below the age of 18 will be entitled to free health services, irrespective of whether they pay premiums to any social security organization or not. The bill also envisages a gradual increase in the retirement age. Starting from 2036, the retirement age will eventually increase to 65 as of 2048 for both men and women.

In January 2008, the Turkish Parliament adopted a law on a complete prohibition of smoking in most of the public places.

=== 2013 corruption arrests ===
In December 2013, Turkish police detained more than 50 people and arrested 16 others, including the general manager of Halkbank and the sons of three government ministers, on charges of corruption. Although Erdoğan blamed foreign ambassadors and pro-Erdoğan newspapers accused the United States or Israel of a plot, outside analysts attribute the arrests to a power struggle between the Prime Minister and Fethullah Gülen. Gülen, who lives in the U.S., leads a religious movement that had supported the AKP's rise to power. In late 2013, Erdoğan's government proposed shutting down Turkish private schools, many of which are funded by Gülen. Gülen's supporters are believed to have wide influence in the police and judiciary in Turkey.

In late December, Hürriyet and Yeni Şafak papers published comments by Erdoğan stating that he believes he is the ultimate target of a corruption and bribery probe of his allies. The Turkish Prime Minister told journalists that anyone attempting to enmesh him in the scandal would be “left empty handed”. Erdoğan reshuffled his Cabinet on 25 December, replacing 10 ministers hours after three ministers, whose sons were detained in relation to the probe, resigned.

=== Telephone recordings and social media ===
A file containing five audio recordings of conversations between Erdoğan and his son from a 26-hour period beginning 17 December 2013, in which he appeared to be instructing his son to conceal very large amounts of money, was posted to YouTube and widely discussed on social media. On 26 February 2014, Erdoğan acknowledged that his telephone had been tapped, but denied that the conversation was real, instead calling it an "immoral montage" that had been "dubbed" by combining other conversations. An analysis by Joshua Marpet of the United States, published by McClatchy, concluded that the recordings were "probably real", and if not, the fabrication was done with a sophistication he had not previously seen.

On the night of 26 February 2014, Turkey's Parliament, dominated by Erdoğan's Justice and Development Party, passed a bill that allowed the government the power to block Internet sites, subject to court review within three days, and granting it access to Internet traffic data. Another bill previously approved by a parliamentary committee would grant the MİT intelligence service access to data held by the government, as well as private institutions and courts. The following day President Abdullah Gül approved placing an investigative agency that appoints judges and prosecutors under the control of Erdoğan's justice minister.

On 20 March, Erdoğan made a speech promising to "rip out the roots" of the Twitter service. Hours later the telecommunications regulator BTK blocked DNS service to the site, citing four court orders the Turkish government had made requiring them to remove content to preserve privacy that had not been heeded. Sources covering the story attributed this to the use of Twitter to share links to the Erdoğan recordings on YouTube. Erdoğan also threatened to ban Facebook. However, the block of Twitter proved ineffective, with traffic increasing a record 138%, and #TwitterisblockedinTurkey becoming the top trending term worldwide. To circumvent the block, Google suggested Turks use Google Public DNS at 8.8.8.8 and 8.8.4.4, numbers which were soon graffitied in dozens of locations around Istanbul. President Abdullah Gül criticized the Twitter ban, defying it himself. Two months later, on 3 June, Turkey's telecommunications watchdog ordered the ban to be lifted, after a ruling by the Constitutional Court.

=== Women and demographics ===
Erdoğan supported the continuation of Turkey's high population growth rate and, in 2008, commented that to ensure the Turkish population remained young every family would need to have at least three children. He repeated this statement on numerous occasions. In 2010, Turkey's population was estimated at 73,700,000, with a growth rate of 1.21% per annum (2009 figure).

On 26 May 2012, answering the question of a reporter after a UN conference on population and development in Turkey, Erdoğan said that abortion is murder, saying, "You either kill a baby in the mother's womb or you kill it after birth. In many cases [not all], there's no difference."

Erdoğan has stated that he opposes Turkey's high and growing rate of caesarean section births because he believes that they reduce the fertility of Turkish women, and he is in favor of limiting the number of such births in Turkish hospitals.

In a 2010 meeting with women NGO representatives, asked why he kept addressing them exclusively as mothers, Erdoğan said: "I do not believe in the equality of men and women. I believe in equal opportunities. Men and women are different and complementary". In 2014, he addressed the Istanbul Women and Justice Summit of the Women and Democracy Association (Turkish: Kadın ve Demokrasi Derneği, or KADEM): "Our religion [Islam] has defined a position for women [in society]: motherhood. You cannot explain this to feminists because they don't accept the concept of motherhood". Calling for "equivalency" between the genders, he stated: "You cannot bring women and men into equal positions; that is against nature because their nature is different", while reaffirming that full equality regardless of gender before the law should be maintained.

In June 2016, Erdogan urged women to have at least 3 children while stating that childless women were deficient and incomplete. Later in 2016 Erdogan led AKP proposed a controversial law to pardon statutory rapists if they marry their victims. If passed, it would result in pardoning of 3000 rapists; however, the proposal couldn't get the required number of votes to be passed as a law. In January 2020, Erdogan stated the need for dealing with Turkey's child marriage problem and his party, made another attempt to reintroduce the amnesty law for statutory rapists who marry their victims. Activists have again opposed the law stating this would legitimize both statutory rape and child marriage in a nation whose age of consent is 18 years.

== Foreign policy ==
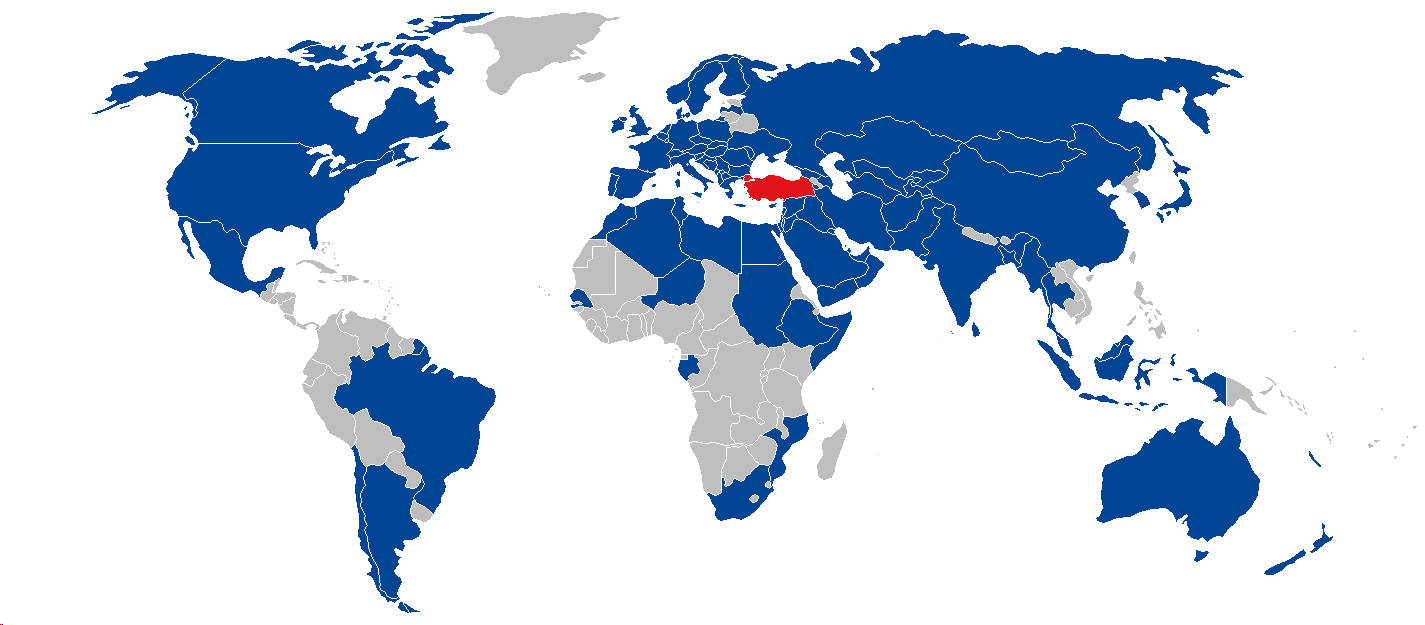
International trips made by Recep Tayyip Erdoğan as prime minister

Turkish foreign policy during Erdoğan's tenure as prime minister has been associated with the name of Ahmet Davutoğlu. Davutoğlu was the chief foreign policy advisor of Prime Minister Recep Tayyip Erdoğan before he was appointed foreign minister in 2009. The basis of Erdoğan's foreign policy is based on the principle of "don't make enemies, make friends" and the pursuit of "zero problems" with neighboring countries.

== See also ==
- List of prime ministers of Turkey
- Presidency of Recep Tayyip Erdoğan

Turkish Premierships
Preceded by Gül	Erdoğan Premiership; 2003–2014	Succeeded by Davutoğlu
