= 22nd Parliament of Turkey =

List of parliamentarians that elected in the 2002 general election held in Turkey

- 18 November 2002 – 22 July 2007
- Speaker(s): Bülent Arınç
- Deputy Speakers: Sadık Yakut; İsmail Alptekin; Nevzat Pakdil; Yılmaz Ateş
- MPs: 550
- Election: July 2007
- Status: AKP majority
- Parties (at start) (Composition shown above): AKP (363); CHP (178); Independents (9)
- Parties (at end): AKP (352); CHP (148); ANAP (20); Independents (14); DYP (4); HYP (1); SHP (1); GP (1); Vacant (9)
- Prime Ministers: Abdullah Gül; Recep Tayyip Erdoğan
- Government(s): 58th, 59th

This is a list of the 550 Members of Parliament elected in the 2002 general election held in Turkey. The MPs are listed by province, in order of election. Turkey uses a D'Hondt proportional representative system to elect Members of Parliament. These MPs formed the 22nd Parliament of Turkey. An overview of the parliamentary composition is shown in the table below.

Party	Members	Change	Proportion
Justice and Development Party	363	▲363	66.0%
Republican People's Party	178	▲178	32.4%
Independents	9	▲6	1.6%
Total	550		100%

== Adana ==
Members	Party
Uğur Aksöz	Republican People's Party
Atilla Başoğlu	Republican People's Party
Abdullah Çalışkan	Justice and Development Party
Ömer Çelik	Justice and Development Party
Nevin Gaye Erbatur	Republican People's Party
Recep Garip	Justice and Development Party
Ali Küçükaydın	Justice and Development Party
Vahit Kirişçi	Justice and Development Party
Kemal Sağ	Republican People's Party
Tacidar Seyhan	Republican People's Party
Ayhan Zeynep Tekin	Justice and Development Party
Abdullah Torun	Justice and Development Party
Ziyattin Yağcı	Justice and Development Party
Mehmet Ziya Yergök	Republican People's Party

== Adıyaman ==
Members	Party
Mahmut Göksu	Justice and Development Party
Şevket Gürsoy	Republican People's Party
Fehmi Hüsrev Kutlu	Justice and Development Party
Mehmet Özyol	Justice and Development Party
Ahmet Faruk Ünsal	Justice and Development Party

== Afyonkarahisar ==
Members	Party
Sait Açba	Justice and Development Party
İbrahim Hakkı Aşkar	Independent
Halil Aydoğan	Justice and Development Party
Ahmet Koca	Justice and Development Party
Mahmut Koçak	Justice and Development Party
Reyhan Tugay	Justice and Development Party
Halil Ünlütepe	Republican People's Party

== Ağrı ==
Members	Party
Naci Aslan	Justice and Development Party
Cemal Kaya	Justice and Development Party
Mehmet Melik Özmen	Justice and Development Party
Halil Özyolcu	Justice and Development Party
Mehmet Kerim Yıldız	Justice and Development Party

== Aksaray ==
Members	Party
Ruhi Açıkgöz	Justice and Development Party
Ali Rıza Alaboyun	Justice and Development Party
Ramazan Toprak	Justice and Development Party
Ahmet Yaşar	Justice and Development Party

== Amasya ==
Members	Party
Hamza Albayrak	Justice and Development Party
Akif Gülle	Justice and Development Party
Mustafa Sayar	Independent

== Ankara ==
Members	Party
Zekeriya Akıncı	Republican People's Party
İsmail Alptekin	Justice and Development Party
Oya Araslı	Republican People's Party
Beşir Atalay	Justice and Development Party
Yılmaz Ateş	Republican People's Party
Ali Babacan	Justice and Development Party
Ayşe Gülsün Bilgehan	Republican People's Party
Ahmet İsmet Çanakcı	Republican People's Party
Cemil Çiçek	Justice and Development Party
İsmail Değerli	Republican People's Party
Reha Denemeç	Justice and Development Party
Eşref Erdem	Republican People's Party
Bülent Gedikli	Justice and Development Party
Haluk İpek	Justice and Development Party
Salih Kapusuz	Justice and Development Party
Telat Karapınar	Justice and Development Party
Yakup Kepenek	Republican People's Party
Faruk Koca	Justice and Development Party
Muzaffer Remzi Kurtulmuşoğlu	Justice and Development Party
Bayramali Meral	Republican People's Party
Mehmet Zekai Özcan	Justice and Development Party
Remziye Öztoprak	Justice and Development Party
Eyyüp Sanay	Justice and Development Party
Önder Sav	Republican People's Party
Mehmet Tomanbay	Republican People's Party
Nur Doğan Topaloğlu	Justice and Development Party
Mustafa Tuna	Justice and Development Party
Ersönmez Yarbay	Justice and Development Party
Mustafa Said Yazıcıoğlu	Justice and Development Party

== Antalya ==
Members	Party
Osman Akman	Justice and Development Party
Fikret Badazlı	Justice and Development Party
Feridun Fikret Baloğlu	Republican People's Party
Deniz Baykal	Republican People's Party
Mevlüt Çavuşoğlu	Justice and Development Party
Mehmet Dülger	Justice and Development Party
Hüseyin Ekmekcioğlu	Republican People's Party
Atila Emek	Republican People's Party
Tuncay Ercenk	Republican People's Party
Nail Kamacı	Republican People's Party
Osman Kaptan	Republican People's Party
Burhan Kılıç	Justice and Development Party
Osman Özcan	Republican People's Party

== Ardahan ==
Members	Party
Kenan Altun	Justice and Development Party
Ensar Öğüt	Republican People's Party

== Artvin ==
Members	Party
Yüksel Çorbacıoğlu	Republican People's Party
Orhan Yıldız	Justice and Development Party

== Aydın ==
Members	Party
Ahmet Rıza Acar	Justice and Development Party
Mehmet Boztaş	Republican People's Party
Özlem Çerçioğlu	Republican People's Party
Ahmet Ertürk	Justice and Development Party
Atilla Koç	Justice and Development Party
Semiha Öyüş	Justice and Development Party
Mehmet Mesut Özakcan	Republican People's Party
Mehmet Semerci	Republican People's Party

== Balıkesir ==
Members	Party
Ali Aydınlıoğlu	Justice and Development Party
Turhan Çömez	Justice and Development Party
Ali Kemal Deveciler	Republican People's Party
İsmail Özgün	Justice and Development Party
Sedat Pekel	Republican People's Party
Ali Osman Sali	Justice and Development Party
Orhan Sür	Republican People's Party
Ahmet Edip Uğur	Justice and Development Party

== Bartın ==
Members	Party
Hacı İbrahim Kabarık	Justice and Development Party
Mehmet Asım Kulak	Justice and Development Party

== Batman ==
Members	Party
Afif Demirkıran	Justice and Development Party
Ahmet İnal	Justice and Development Party
Mehmet Nezir Nasıroğlu	Justice and Development Party
Memet Ali Suçin	Justice and Development Party

== Bayburt ==
Members	Party
Fetani Battal	Justice and Development Party
Ülkü Gökalp Güney	Justice and Development Party

== Bilecik ==
Members	Party
Fahrettin Poyraz	Justice and Development Party
Yaşar Tüzün	Republican People's Party

== Bingöl ==
Members	Party
Abdurrahman Anık	Justice and Development Party
Feyzi Berdibek	Justice and Development Party
Mahfuz Güler	Justice and Development Party

== Bitlis ==
Members	Party
Abdurrahim Aksoy	Justice and Development Party
Zeki Ergezen	Justice and Development Party
Edip Safder Gaydalı	Independent
Vahit Kiler	Justice and Development Party

== Bolu ==
Members	Party
Yüksel Coşkunyürek	Justice and Development Party
Mehmet Güner	Justice and Development Party
Metin Yılmaz	Justice and Development Party

== Burdur ==
Members	Party
Mehmet Alp	Justice and Development Party
Bayram Özçelik	Justice and Development Party
Ramazan Kerim Özkan	Republican People's Party

== Bursa ==
Members	Party
Abdulmecit Alp	Justice and Development Party
Faruk Anbarcıoğlu	Justice and Development Party
Şerif Birinç	Justice and Development Party
Faruk Çelik	Justice and Development Party
Kemal Demirel	Republican People's Party
Ali Dinçer	Republican People's Party
Mustafa Dündar	Justice and Development Party
Zafer Hıdıroğlu	Justice and Development Party
Mehmet Altan Karapaşaoğlu	Justice and Development Party
Sedat Kızılcıklı	Justice and Development Party
Mehmet Küçükaşık	Republican People's Party
Şevket Orhan	Justice and Development Party
Mustafa Özyurt	Republican People's Party
Niyazi Pakyürek	Justice and Development Party
Mehmet Emin Tutan	Justice and Development Party
Ertuğrul Yalçınbayır	Justice and Development Party

== Çanakkale ==
Members	Party
Mehmet Daniş	Justice and Development Party
İbrahim Köşdere	Justice and Development Party
Ahmet Küçük	Republican People's Party
İsmail Özay	Republican People's Party

== Çankırı ==
Members	Party
Tevfik Akbak	Justice and Development Party
İsmail Ericekli	Justice and Development Party
Hikmet Özdemir	Justice and Development Party

== Çorum ==
Members	Party
Feridun Ayvazoğlu	Justice and Development Party
Agah Kafkas	Justice and Development Party
Ali Yüksel Kavuştu	Justice and Development Party
Muzaffer Külcü	Justice and Development Party
Murat Yıldırım	Justice and Development Party

== Denizli ==
Members	Party
Mehmet Salih Erdoğan	Justice and Development Party
Osman Nuri Filiz	Justice and Development Party
Mustafa Gazalcı	Republican People's Party
Ümmet Kandoğan	Justice and Development Party
Mehmet Ugur Neşşar	Republican People's Party
Veli Haşim Oral	Republican People's Party
Mehmet Yüksektepe	Justice and Development Party

== Diyarbakır ==
Members	Party
Aziz Akgül	Justice and Development Party
M. İhsan Arslan	Justice and Development Party
Osman Aslan	Justice and Development Party
Mesut Değer	Republican People's Party
Mehmet Mehdi Eker	Justice and Development Party
Muhsin Koçyiğit	Justice and Development Party
Ali İhsan Merdanoğlu	Justice and Development Party
Cavit Torun	Justice and Development Party
Mehmet Fehmi Uyanık	Justice and Development Party
İrfan Riza Yazıcıoğlu	Justice and Development Party

== Düzce ==
Members	Party
Fahri Çakır	Justice and Development Party
Metin Kaşıkoğlu	Justice and Development Party
Yaşar Yakış	Justice and Development Party

== Edirne ==
Members	Party
Ali Ayağ	Independent
Necdet Budak	Justice and Development Party
Rasim Çakır	Republican People's Party
Nejat Gencan	Republican People's Party

== Elazığ ==
Members	Party
Mehmet Kemal Ağar	Independent
Mehmet Necati Çetinkaya	Justice and Development Party
Zülfü Demirbağ	Justice and Development Party
Şemsettin Murat	Justice and Development Party
Abdulbaki Türkoğlu	Justice and Development Party

== Erzincan ==
Members	Party
Talip Kaban	Justice and Development Party
Tevhit Karakaya	Justice and Development Party
Erol Tınastepe	Republican People's Party

== Erzurum ==
Members	Party
Mustafa Nuri Akbulut	Justice and Development Party
Recep Akdağ	Justice and Development Party
Mücahit Daloğlu	Justice and Development Party
Muzaffer Gülyurt	Justice and Development Party
Mustafa Ilıcalı	Justice and Development Party
İbrahim Özdoğan	Justice and Development Party
Ömer Özyılmaz	Justice and Development Party

== Eskişehir ==
Members	Party
Mehmet Ali Arıkan	Republican People's Party
Fahri Keskin	Justice and Development Party
Hasan Murat Mercan	Justice and Development Party
Mehmet Cevdet Selvi	Republican People's Party
Muharrem Tozçöken	Justice and Development Party
Mehmet Vedat Yücesan	Republican People's Party

== Gaziantep ==
Members	Party
Ömer Abuşoğlu	Justice and Development Party
Nurettin Aktaş	Justice and Development Party
Abdülkadir Ateş	Republican People's Party
Mahmut Durdu	Justice and Development Party
Mehmet Sarı	Justice and Development Party
Fatma Şahin	Justice and Development Party
Kürşad Tüzmen	Justice and Development Party
Ahmet Uzer	Justice and Development Party
Mustafa Yılmaz	Republican People's Party
Ahmet Yılmazkaya	Republican People's Party

== Giresun ==
Members	Party
Hasan Aydın	Justice and Development Party
Nurettin Canikli	Justice and Development Party
Mehmet Işık	Republican People's Party
Adem Tatlı	Justice and Development Party
Ali Temür	Justice and Development Party

== Gümüşhane ==
Members	Party
Sabri Varan	Justice and Development Party
Temel Yılmaz	Justice and Development Party

== Hakkari ==
Members	Party
Esat Canan	Independent
Fehmi Öztünç	Justice and Development Party
Mustafa Zeydan	Justice and Development Party

== Hatay ==
Members	Party
Züheyir Amber	Republican People's Party
İnal Batu	Republican People's Party
Fuat Çay	Republican People's Party
Gökhan Durgun	Republican People's Party
Mehmet Eraslan	Independent
Sadullah Ergin	Justice and Development Party
Fuat Geçen	Independent
Mehmet Soydan	Justice and Development Party
İsmail Soylu	Justice and Development Party
Abdulaziz Yazar	Republican People's Party

== Iğdır ==
Members	Party
Dursun Akdemir	Justice and Development Party
Yücel Artantaş	Republican People's Party

== Isparta ==
Members	Party
Mehmet Sait Armağan	Justice and Development Party
Mehmet Emin Murat Bilgiç	Justice and Development Party
Mevlüt Coşkuner	Republican People's Party
Erkan Mumcu	Justice and Development Party
Recep Özel	Justice and Development Party

== İstanbul ==
Members	Party
Mehmet Mustafa Açıkalın	Justice and Development Party
Abdülkadir Aksu	Justice and Development Party
Güldal Akşit	Justice and Development Party
Halil Akyüz	Republican People's Party
İlhan Albayrak	Justice and Development Party
Tayyar Altıkulaç	Justice and Development Party
Ersin Arıoğlu	Republican People's Party
İsmet Atalay	Justice and Development Party
Mustafa Ataş	Justice and Development Party
Azmi Ateş	Justice and Development Party
Hasan Aydın	Republican People's Party
Lokman Ayva	Justice and Development Party
Egemen Bağış	Justice and Development Party
Mustafa Baş	Justice and Development Party
Yahya Baş	Justice and Development Party
Murat Başesgioğlu	Justice and Development Party
Nusret Bayraktar	Justice and Development Party
Hüseyin Besli	Justice and Development Party
Alaattin Büyükkaya	Justice and Development Party
Ali Coşkun	Justice and Development Party
Nimet Çubukçu	Justice and Development Party
Mehmet Beyazıt Denizolgun	Justice and Development Party
Kemal Derviş	Republican People's Party
Nazım Ekren	Justice and Development Party
Mustafa Şükrü Elekdağ	Republican People's Party
Ekrem Erdem	Justice and Development Party
Gürsoy Erol	Justice and Development Party
Ali Rıza Gülçiçek	Republican People's Party
İrfan Gündüz	Justice and Development Party
Hasan Fehmi Güneş	Republican People's Party
Zeynep Damla Gürel	Republican People's Party
Algan Hacaloğlu	Republican People's Party
Memduh Hacıoğlu	Independent
Ali İbiş	Justice and Development Party
Halide İncekara	Justice and Development Party
Ünal Kacır	Justice and Development Party
Hüseyin Kansu	Justice and Development Party
Cengiz Kaptanoğlu	Justice and Development Party
Muharrem Karslı	Justice and Development Party
Birgen Keleş	Republican People's Party
Ahmet Güryüz Ketenci	Republican People's Party
Kemal Kılıçdaroğlu	Republican People's Party
Recep Koral	Justice and Development Party
Ali Kemal Kumkumoğlu	Republican People's Party
Burhan Kuzu	Justice and Development Party
Göksal Küçükali	Independent
Ömer Zülfü Livaneli	Independent
Güldal Okuducu	Republican People's Party
Onur Başaran Öymen	Republican People's Party
İbrahim Reyhan Özal	Justice and Development Party
Ahmet Sırrı Özbek	Republican People's Party
İnci Özdemir	Justice and Development Party
Mehmet Ali Özpolat	Republican People's Party
Yaşar Nuri Öztürk	Republican People's Party
Sıdıka Sarıbekir	Republican People's Party
Mehmet Sekmen	Justice and Development Party
Mehmet Sevigen	Republican People's Party
İdris Naim Şahin	Justice and Development Party
Mehmet Ali Şahin	Justice and Development Party
Berhan Şimşek	Republican People's Party
Emin Şirin	Justice and Development Party
Bihlun Tamaylıgil	Republican People's Party
Bülent Hasan Tanla	Republican People's Party
Ali Topuz	Republican People's Party
Gülseren Topuz	Justice and Development Party
Kemal Unakıtan	Justice and Development Party
Zeynep Armağan Uslu	Justice and Development Party
Hayati Yazıcı	Justice and Development Party
Binali Yıldırım	Justice and Development Party

== İzmir ==
Members	Party
Hakkı Akalın	Republican People's Party
Zekeriya Akçam	Justice and Development Party
Vezir Akdemir	Republican People's Party
Kıvılcım Kemal Anadol	Republican People's Party
Cânân Aritman	Republican People's Party
Mehmet Aydın	Justice and Development Party
Bülent Baratalı	Republican People's Party
Ali Rıza Bodur	Republican People's Party
Tevfik Ensari	Justice and Development Party
Ahmet Ersin	Republican People's Party
Abdurrezzak Erten	Republican People's Party
Fatma Seniha Nükhet Hotar	Justice and Development Party
Erdal Karademir	Republican People's Party
Fazıl Karaman	Justice and Development Party
İsmail Katmerci	Justice and Development Party
Yılmaz Kaya	Republican People's Party
Türkan Miçooğulları	Republican People's Party
Oğuz Oyan	Republican People's Party
Enver Öktem	Republican People's Party
Mehmet Sayım Tekelioğlu	Justice and Development Party
Muharrem Toprak	Republican People's Party
Sedat Uzunbay	Republican People's Party
Hakkı Ülkü	Republican People's Party
Serpil Yıldız	Justice and Development Party

== Kahramanmaraş ==
Members	Party
Fatih Arıkan	Justice and Development Party
Mehmet Ali Bulut	Justice and Development Party
Avni Doğan	Justice and Development Party
Hanefi Mahçiçek	Justice and Development Party
Nevzat Pakdil	Justice and Development Party
Mehmet Parlakyiğit	Justice and Development Party
Ali Sezal	Justice and Development Party
Mehmet Yılmazcan	Justice and Development Party

== Karabük ==
Members	Party
Hasan Bilir	Justice and Development Party
Mehmet Ceylan	Justice and Development Party
Ali Öğüten	Justice and Development Party

== Karaman ==
Members	Party
Mevlüt Akgün	Justice and Development Party
Yüksel Çavuşoğlu	Justice and Development Party
Fikret Ünlü	Republican People's Party

== Kars ==
Members	Party
Yusuf Selahattin Beyribey	Justice and Development Party
Zeki Karabayır	Justice and Development Party
Selami Yiğit	Independent

== Kastamonu ==
Members	Party
Hakkı Köylü	Justice and Development Party
Sinan Özkan	Justice and Development Party
Musa Sıvacıoğlu	Justice and Development Party
Mehmet Yıldırım	Justice and Development Party

== Kayseri ==
Members	Party
Adem Baştürk	Justice and Development Party
Mustafa Duru	Justice and Development Party
Mustafa Elitaş	Justice and Development Party
Muharrem Eskiyapan	Justice and Development Party
Abdullah Gül	Justice and Development Party
Niyazi Özcan	Justice and Development Party
Sadık Yakut	Justice and Development Party
Taner Yıldız	Justice and Development Party

== Kırıkkale ==
Members	Party
Ramazan Can	Justice and Development Party
Vahit Erdem	Justice and Development Party
Halil Tiryaki	Republican People's Party
Murat Yılmazer	Justice and Development Party

== Kırklareli ==
Members	Party
Yavuz Altınorak	Republican People's Party
Mehmet Kesimoğlu	Republican People's Party
Ahmet Gökhan Sarıçam	Justice and Development Party

== Kırşehir ==
Members	Party
Mikail Arslan	Justice and Development Party
Hüseyin Bayındır	Republican People's Party
Hacı Turan	Justice and Development Party

== Kilis ==
Members	Party
Hasan Kara	Justice and Development Party
Veli Kaya	Justice and Development Party

== Kocaeli ==
Members	Party
Eyüp Ayar	Justice and Development Party
Muzaffer Baştopçu	Justice and Development Party
İzzet Çetin	Republican People's Party
Nevzat Doğan	Justice and Development Party
Nihat Ergün	Justice and Development Party
Mehmet Vecdi Gönül	Justice and Development Party
Salih Gün	Republican People's Party
Osman Pepe	Justice and Development Party
Mehmet Sefa Sirmen	Republican People's Party

== Konya ==
Members	Party
Hasan Angı	Justice and Development Party
Ahmet Büyükakkaşlar	Justice and Development Party
Nezir Büyükcengiz	Republican People's Party
Muharrem Candan	Justice and Development Party
Remzi Çetin	Justice and Development Party
Abdullah Çetinkaya	Justice and Development Party
Orhan Erdem	Justice and Development Party
Sami Güçlü	Justice and Development Party
Ahmet Işık	Justice and Development Party
Atilla Kart	Republican People's Party
Mehmet Kılıç	Justice and Development Party
Özkan Öksüz	Justice and Development Party
Kerim Özkul	Justice and Development Party
Harun Tüfekci	Justice and Development Party
Mustafa Ünaldı	Justice and Development Party
Halil Ürün	Justice and Development Party

== Kütahya ==
Members	Party
Soner Aksoy	Justice and Development Party
Abdullah Erdem Cantimur	Justice and Development Party
Alaettin Güven	Justice and Development Party
Hasan Fehmi Kinay	Justice and Development Party
Hüsnü Ordu	Justice and Development Party
Halil İbrahim Yılmaz	Justice and Development Party

== Malatya ==
Members	Party
Miraç Akdoğan	Justice and Development Party
Ferit Mevlüt Aslanoğlu	Republican People's Party
Ali Osman Başkurt	Justice and Development Party
Ahmet Münir Erkal	Justice and Development Party
Muharrem Kılıç	Republican People's Party
Fuat Ölmeztoprak	Justice and Development Party
Süleyman Sarıbaş	Justice and Development Party

== Manisa ==
Members	Party
Bülent Arınç	Justice and Development Party
İsmail Bilen	Justice and Development Party
Mehmet Çerçi	Justice and Development Party
Nuri Çilingir	Republican People's Party
Hasan Ören	Republican People's Party
Ufuk Özkan	Republican People's Party
Hüseyin Tanrıverdi	Justice and Development Party
Hakan Taşcı	Justice and Development Party
Süleyman Turgut	Justice and Development Party
Mustafa Erdoğan Yetenç	Republican People's Party

== Mardin ==
Members	Party
Süleyman Bölünmez	Justice and Development Party
Selahattin Cebeli	Justice and Development Party
Muharrem Doğan	Independent
Mahmut Duyan	Republican People's Party
Nihat Eri	Justice and Development Party
Mehmet Beşir Hamidi	Justice and Development Party

== Mersin ==
Members	Party
Saffet Benli	Justice and Development Party
Ersoy Bulut	Republican People's Party
Vahit Çekmez	Republican People's Party
Ali Er	Justice and Development Party
Mustafa Eyiceoğlu	Justice and Development Party
Dengir Mir Mehmet Fırat	Justice and Development Party
Hüseyin Güler	Republican People's Party
Ömer İnan	Justice and Development Party
Ali Oksal	Republican People's Party
Hüseyin Özcan	Republican People's Party
Mustafa Özyürek	Republican People's Party
Şefik Zengin	Republican People's Party

== Muğla ==
Members	Party
Ali Arslan	Republican People's Party
Gürol Ergin	Republican People's Party
Hasan Özyer	Justice and Development Party
Orhan Seyfi Terzibaşıoğlu	Justice and Development Party
Fahrettin Üstün	Republican People's Party
Ali Cumhur Yaka	Republican People's Party

== Muş ==
Members	Party
Mehmet Şerif Ertuğrul	Republican People's Party
Seracettin Karayağız	Justice and Development Party
Sabahattin Yıldız	Justice and Development Party
Medeni Yılmaz	Justice and Development Party

== Nevşehir ==
Members	Party
Mehmet Elkatmış	Justice and Development Party
Rıtvan Köybaşı	Justice and Development Party
Osman Seyfi	Justice and Development Party

== Niğde ==
Members	Party
Mahmut Uğur Çetin	Justice and Development Party
Orhan Eraslan	Republican People's Party
Erdoğan Özegen	Justice and Development Party

== Ordu ==
Members	Party
Eyüp Fatsa	Justice and Development Party
Mehmet Hilmi Güler	Justice and Development Party
İdris Sami Tandoğdu	Republican People's Party
Hamit Taşcı	Justice and Development Party
Kazım Türkmen	Republican People's Party
Cemal Uysal	Justice and Development Party
Enver Yılmaz	Justice and Development Party

== Osmaniye ==
Members	Party
Durdu Mehmet Kastal	Justice and Development Party
Mehmet Sarı	Justice and Development Party
Necati Uzdil	Republican People's Party
Şükrü Ünal	Justice and Development Party

== Rize ==
Members	Party
İlyas Çakır	Justice and Development Party
Abdulkadir Kart	Justice and Development Party
İmdat Sütlüoğlu	Justice and Development Party

== Sakarya ==
Members	Party
Erol Aslan Cebeci	Justice and Development Party
Hasan Ali Çelik	Justice and Development Party
Şaban Dişli	Justice and Development Party
Süleyman Gündüz	Justice and Development Party
Ayhan Sefer Üstün	Justice and Development Party
Recep Yıldırım	Justice and Development Party

== Samsun ==
Members	Party
Mustafa Çakır	Justice and Development Party
Cemal Yılmaz Demir	Justice and Development Party
Mustafa Demir	Justice and Development Party
Suat Kılıç	Justice and Development Party
Haluk Koç	Republican People's Party
Mehmet Kurt	Justice and Development Party
İlyas Sezai Önder	Republican People's Party
Musa Uzunkaya	Justice and Development Party
Ahmet Yeni	Justice and Development Party

== Siirt ==
Members	Party
Recep Tayyip Erdoğan	Justice and Development Party
Öner Ergenç	Justice and Development Party
Öner Gülyeşil	Justice and Development Party

== Sinop ==
Members	Party
Engin Altay	Republican People's Party
Cahit Can	Justice and Development Party
Mustafa Öztürk	Justice and Development Party

== Sivas ==
Members	Party
Osman Kılıç	Justice and Development Party
Ömer Kulaksız	Justice and Development Party
Nurettin Sözen	Republican People's Party
Abdüllatif Şener	Justice and Development Party
Orhan Taş	Justice and Development Party
Selami Uzun	Justice and Development Party

== Şanlıurfa ==
Members	Party
Yahya Akman	Justice and Development Party
Mehmet Faruk Bayrak	Justice and Development Party
Sabahattin Cevheri	Justice and Development Party
Zülfükar İzol	Justice and Development Party
Mahmut Kaplan	Justice and Development Party
Mehmet Atilla Maraş	Justice and Development Party
Mehmet Vedat Melik	Republican People's Party
Mehmet Özlek	Justice and Development Party
Turan Tüysüz	Justice and Development Party
Abdurrahman Müfit Yetkin	Justice and Development Party
Mahmut Yıldız	Republican People's Party

== Şırnak ==
Members	Party
İbrahim Hakkı Birlik	Justice and Development Party
Abdullah Veli Seyda	Justice and Development Party
Mehmet Tatar	Justice and Development Party

== Tekirdağ ==
Members	Party
Tevfik Ziyaeddin Akbulut	Justice and Development Party
Ahmet Kambur	Justice and Development Party
Erdoğan Kaplan	Republican People's Party
Mehmet Nuri Saygun	Republican People's Party
Enis Tütüncü	Republican People's Party

== Tokat ==
Members	Party
Zeyid Aslan	Justice and Development Party
Şükrü Ayalan	Justice and Development Party
İbrahim Çakmak	Justice and Development Party
Mehmet Ergün Dağcıoğlu	Justice and Development Party
Orhan Ziya Diren	Republican People's Party
Feramüz Şahin	Republican People's Party
Resul Tosun	Justice and Development Party

== Trabzon ==
Members	Party
Şevket Arz	Republican People's Party
Asım Aykan	Justice and Development Party
Mustafa Cumur	Justice and Development Party
Ali Aydın Dumanoğlu	Justice and Development Party
Cevdet Erdöl	Justice and Development Party
Kemalettin Göktaş	Justice and Development Party
Mehmet Akif Hamzaçebi	Republican People's Party
Faruk Nafız Özak	Justice and Development Party

== Tunceli ==
Members	Party
Hasan Güyüldar	Republican People's Party
Vahdet Sinan Yerlikaya	Republican People's Party

== Uşak ==
Members	Party
Alim Tunç	Justice and Development Party
Ahmet Çağlayan	Justice and Development Party
Osman Coşkunoğlu	Republican People's Party

== Van ==
Members	Party
Maliki Ejder Arvas	Justice and Development Party
Haci Biner	Justice and Development Party
Hüseyin Çelik	Justice and Development Party
Yekta Haydaroğlu	Justice and Development Party
Cüneyit Karabıyık	Justice and Development Party
Kenan Ateş	Justice and Development Party
Halil Kaya	Justice and Development Party

== Yalova ==
Members	Party
Muharrem İnce	Republican People's Party
Şükrü Önder	Justice and Development Party

== Yozgat ==
Members	Party
İlyas Arslan	Justice and Development Party
Bekir Bozdağ	Justice and Development Party
Mehmet Çiçek	Justice and Development Party
Mehmet Erdemir	Justice and Development Party
Emin Koç	Republican People's Party
Mehmet Yaşar Öztürk	Justice and Development Party

== Zonguldak ==
Members	Party
Harun Akın	Republican People's Party
Fazlı Erdoğan	Justice and Development Party
Nadir Saraç	Republican People's Party
Köksal Toptan	Justice and Development Party
Polat Türkmen	Justice and Development Party
