= 60th cabinet of Turkey =

Government of the Republic of Turkey (2007-2011)

Second Recep Tayyip Erdoğan cabinet II. Erdoğan Hükümeti
- 60th Cabinet of Turkey
- 29 August 2007 – 14 June 2011
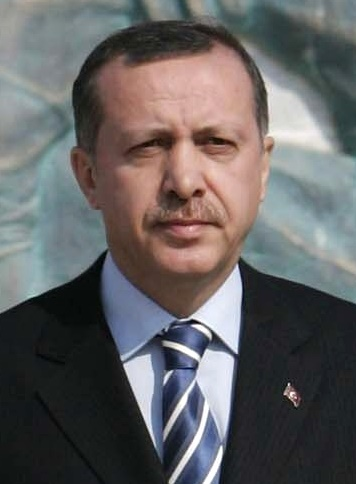
- Date formed: 29 August 2007
- Date dissolved: 14 June 2011

People and organisations
- Head of state: Abdullah Gül
- Head of government: Recep Tayyip Erdoğan
- No. of ministers: 27
- Total no. of members: 44
- Member party: Justice and Development Party
- Status in legislature: Single-party majority
- Opposition party: Republican People's Party
- Opposition leader: Deniz Baykal (2007-2010); Kemal Kılıçdaroğlu (2010 onwards)

History
- Election: 22 July 2007
- Legislature term: 23rd
- Predecessor: Erdoğan I
- Successor: Erdoğan III

The second cabinet of Recep Tayyip Erdogan was the cabinet of the government of Turkey from 29 August 2007 to 14 June 2011. It followed the first cabinet of Erdoğan. It laid down its function after the formation of the Cabinet Erdoğan III, which was formed following the 2011 elections.

Functions		Holder	Start	End
English title	Turkish title	Holder	Start	End
Prime Minister	Başbakan	Recep Tayyip Erdoğan	29 August 2007	14 June 2011
Deputy Prime Minister; Minister of State; Responsible for Inter-ministerial Coordination, Human Rights and Cyprus	Başbakan Yardımcısı; Devlet Bakanı	Cemil Çiçek	29 August 2007	14 June 2011
Deputy Prime Minister; Minister of State; Responsible for Foundations and TRT	Başbakan Yardımcısı; Devlet Bakanı	Hayati Yazıcı	29 August 2007	1 May 2009
Deputy Prime Minister; Minister of State; Responsible for Foundations and TRT	Başbakan Yardımcısı; Devlet Bakanı	Bülent Arınç	1 May 2009	14 June 2011
Deputy Prime Minister; Minister of State; Responsible for the Economy, Banking and Treasury	Başbakan Yardımcısı; Devlet Bakanı	Nazım Ekren	29 August 2007	1 May 2009
Deputy Prime Minister; Minister of State; Responsible for the Economy, Banking and Treasury	Başbakan Yardımcısı; Devlet Bakanı	Ali Babacan	1 May 2009	14 June 2011
Minister of State; Responsible for Information Technology and the Alliance of Civilizations	Devlet Bakanı	Mehmet Aydın	29 August 2007	14 June 2011
Minister of State; Responsible of Foreign Trade	Devlet Bakanı	Kürşad Tüzmen	29 August 2007	1 May 2009
Minister of State; Responsible of Foreign Trade	Devlet Bakanı	Mehmet Zafer Çağlayan	1 May 2009	14 June 2011
Minister of State; Responsible for Women and Family	Devlet Bakanı	Nimet Çubukçu	29 August 2007	1 May 2009
Minister of State; Responsible for Women and Family	Devlet Bakanı	Selma Aliye Kavaf	1 May 2009	14 June 2011
Minister of State; Responsible of the Southeastern Anatolia Project	Devlet Bakanı	Cevdet Yılmaz	1 May 2009	14 June 2011
Minister of State; Responsible for Religious Affairs and the Turkish World	Devlet Bakanı	Mustafa Sait Yazıcıoğlu	29 August 2007	1 May 2009
Minister of State; Responsible for Religious Affairs and the Turkish World	Devlet Bakanı	Faruk Çelik	1 May 2009	14 June 2011
Minister of State; Responsible for Youth and Sports	Devlet Bakanı	Murat Başesgioğlu	29 August 2007	1 May 2009
Minister of State; Responsible for Youth and Sports	Devlet Bakanı	Faruk Nafız Özak	1 May 2009	14 June 2011
Minister of State; Chief Negotiator with the European Union	Devlet Bakanı	Egemen Bağış	8 January 2009	14 June 2011
Minister of State; Responsible for Customs, Istanbul 2010 and Social Protection	Devlet Bakanı	Hayati Yazıcı	1 May 2009	14 June 2011
Ministry of Foreign Affairs	Dışişleri Bakanı	Ali Babacan	29 August 2007	1 May 2009
Ministry of Foreign Affairs	Dışişleri Bakanı	Ahmet Davutoğlu	1 May 2009	14 June 2011
Ministry of the Interior	İçişleri Bakanı	Beşir Atalay	29 August 2007	8 March 2011
Ministry of the Interior	İçişleri Bakanı	Osman Güneş^{¶}	8 March 2011	14 June 2011
Ministry of Finance	Maliye Bakanı	Kemal Unakıtan	29 August 2007	1 May 2009
Ministry of Finance	Maliye Bakanı	Mehmet Şimşek	1 May 2009	14 June 2011
Ministry of Justice	Adalet Bakanı	Mehmet Ali Şahin	29 August 2007	1 May 2009
Ministry of Justice	Adalet Bakanı	Sadullah Ergin	1 May 2009	8 March 2011
Ministry of Justice	Adalet Bakanı	Ahmet Kahraman^{¶}	8 March 2011	14 June 2011
Ministry of Energy and Natural Resources	Enerji ve Tabii Kaynaklar Bakanı	Hilmi Güler	29 August 2007	1 May 2009
Ministry of Energy and Natural Resources	Enerji ve Tabii Kaynaklar Bakanı	Taner Yıldız	1 May 2009	14 June 2011
Ministry of Agriculture	Tarım ve Köyişleri Bakanı	Mehmet Mehdi Eker	29 August 2007	14 June 2011
Ministry of Culture and Tourism	Kültür ve Turizm Bakanı	Ertuğrul Günay	29 August 2007	14 June 2011
Ministry of Health	Sağlık Bakanı	Recep Akdağ	29 August 2007	14 June 2011
Ministry of National Education	Millî Eğitim Bakanı	Hüseyin Çelik	29 August 2007	1 May 2009
Ministry of National Education	Millî Eğitim Bakanı	Nimet Çubukçu	1 May 2009	14 June 2011
Ministry of National Defense	Millî Savunma Bakanı	Vecdi Gönül	29 August 2007	14 June 2011
Ministry of Industry and Commerce	Sanayi ve Ticaret Bakanı	Mehmet Zafer Çağlayan	29 August 2007	1 May 2009
Ministry of Industry and Commerce	Sanayi ve Ticaret Bakanı	Nihat Ergün	1 May 2009	14 June 2011
Ministry of Labour and Social Security	Çalışma ve Sosyal Güvenlik Bakanı	Faruk Çelik	29 August 2007	1 May 2009
Ministry of Labour and Social Security	Çalışma ve Sosyal Güvenlik Bakanı	Ömer Dinçer	1 May 2009	14 June 2011
Ministry of Transport and Communication	Ulaştırma Bakanı	Binali Yıldırım	29 August 2007	8 March 2011
Ministry of Transport and Communication	Ulaştırma Bakanı	Habip Soluk^{¶}	8 March 2011	14 June 2011
Ministry of Public Works and Settlement	Bayındırlık ve İskân Bakanı	Faruk Nafız Özak	29 August 2007	1 May 2009
Ministry of Public Works and Settlement	Bayındırlık ve İskân Bakanı	Mustafa Demir	1 May 2009	14 June 2011
Ministry of Environment and Forestry	Çevre ve Orman Bakanı	Veysel Eroğlu	29 August 2007	14 June 2011

^¶ Nonpartisan minister appointed in accordance with the Article 114 of the constitution in the wake of 2011 elections

== See also ==
- Cabinet of Turkey
