= 59th cabinet of Turkey =

Government of Turkey (2003–2007)

First Recep Tayyip Erdoğan cabinet I. Erdoğan Hükümeti
- 59th Cabinet of Turkey
- 14 March 2003 – 28 August 2007
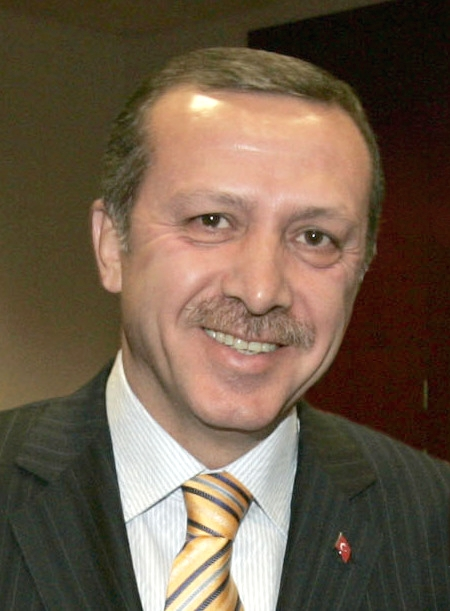
- Date formed: 14 March 2003
- Date dissolved: 28 August 2007

People and organisations
- Head of state: Ahmet Necdet Sezer
- Head of government: Recep Tayyip Erdoğan
- No. of ministers: 24
- Total no. of members: 26
- Member party: Justice and Development Party
- Status in legislature: Single-party majority
- Opposition party: Republican People's Party
- Opposition leader: Deniz Baykal

History
- Elections: 3 November 2002; 9 March 2003 (by-election)
- Legislature term: 22nd
- Predecessor: Gül
- Successor: Erdoğan II

The first cabinet of Recep Tayyip Erdogan took office on 14 March 2003. He succeeded to the government Gul, who was in office since 18 November 2002.

After the victory of the Justice and Development (AK Party) at the parliamentary elections of 22 July 2007 and the presidential election of Abdullah Gül, who took office on 28 August, on the same day Prime Minister Recep Tayyip Erdogan created a new parliament. Many of the former cabinet members were not carried over.

Functions		Holder	Start	End
English title	Turkish title	Holder	Start	End
Prime Minister	Başbakan	Recep Tayyip Erdoğan	14 March 2003	28 August 2007
Deputy Prime Minister	Başbakan Yardımcısı	Abdullah Gül	14 March 2003	28 August 2007
Ministry of Foreign Affairs	Dışişleri Bakanı	Abdullah Gül	14 March 2003	28 August 2007
Deputy Prime Minister	Başbakan Yardımcısı	Mehmet Ali Şahin	14 March 2003	28 August 2007
Deputy Prime Minister	Başbakan Yardımcısı	Abdüllatif Şener	14 March 2003	28 August 2007
Minister of State	Devlet Bakanı	Ali Babacan	14 March 2003	28 August 2007
Minister of State	Devlet Bakanı	Nimet Çubukçu	14 March 2003	28 August 2007
Minister of State	Devlet Bakanı	Mehmet Aydın	14 March 2003	28 August 2007
Minister of State	Devlet Bakanı	Kürşad Tüzmen	14 March 2003	28 August 2007
Minister of State	Devlet Bakanı	Beşir Atalay	14 March 2003	28 August 2007
Ministry of Justice	Adalet Bakanı	Cemil Çiçek	14 March 2003	8 May 2007
Ministry of Justice	Adalet Bakanı	Fahri Kasırga^{¶}	8 May 2007	28 August 2007
Ministry of National Defense	Millî Savunma Bakanı	Mehmet Vecdi Gönül	14 March 2003	28 August 2007
Ministry of the Interior	İçişleri Bakanı	Abdülkadir Aksu	14 March 2003	8 May 2007
Ministry of the Interior	İçişleri Bakanı	Osman Güneş^{¶}	8 May 2007	28 August 2007
Ministry of Finance	Maliye Bakanı	Kemal Unakıtan	14 March 2003	28 August 2007
Ministry of National Education	Millî Eğitim Bakanı	Hüseyin Çelik	14 March 2003	28 August 2007
Ministry of Public Works and Settlement	Bayındırlık ve İskân Bakanı	Faruk Nafız Özak	14 March 2003	28 August 2007
Ministry of Health	Sağlık Bakanı	Recep Akdağ	14 March 2003	28 August 2007
Ministry of Transport and Communication	Ulaştırma Bakanı	Binali Yıldırım	14 March 2003	8 May 2007
Ministry of Transport and Communication	Ulaştırma Bakanı	İsmet Yılmaz^{¶}	8 May 2007	28 August 2007
Ministry of Agriculture	Tarım ve Köyişleri Bakanı	Mehmet Mehdi Eker	14 March 2003	28 August 2007
Ministry of Labour and Social Security	Çalışma ve Sosyal Güvenlik Bakanı	Murat Başesgioğlu	14 March 2003	28 August 2007
Ministry of Industry and Commerce	Sanayi ve Ticaret Bakanı	Ali Coşkun	14 March 2003	28 August 2007
Ministry of Energy and Natural Resources	Enerji ve Tabii Kaynaklar Bakanı	Mehmet Hilmi Güler	14 March 2003	28 August 2007
Ministry of Culture and Tourism	Kültür ve Turizm Bakanı	Atilla Koç	14 March 2003	28 August 2007
Ministry of Environment and Forestry	Çevre ve Orman Bakanı	Osman Pepe	14 March 2003	28 August 2007

^¶ Nonpartisan minister appointed in accordance with the Article 114 of the constitution in the wake of 2007 elections

== See also ==
- Cabinet of Turkey
