= 61st cabinet of Turkey =

Government of the Republic of Turkey (2011-2014)

Third Recep Tayyip Erdoğan cabinet III. Erdoğan Hükümeti
- 61st Cabinet of Turkey
- 6 July 2011 – 29 August 2014
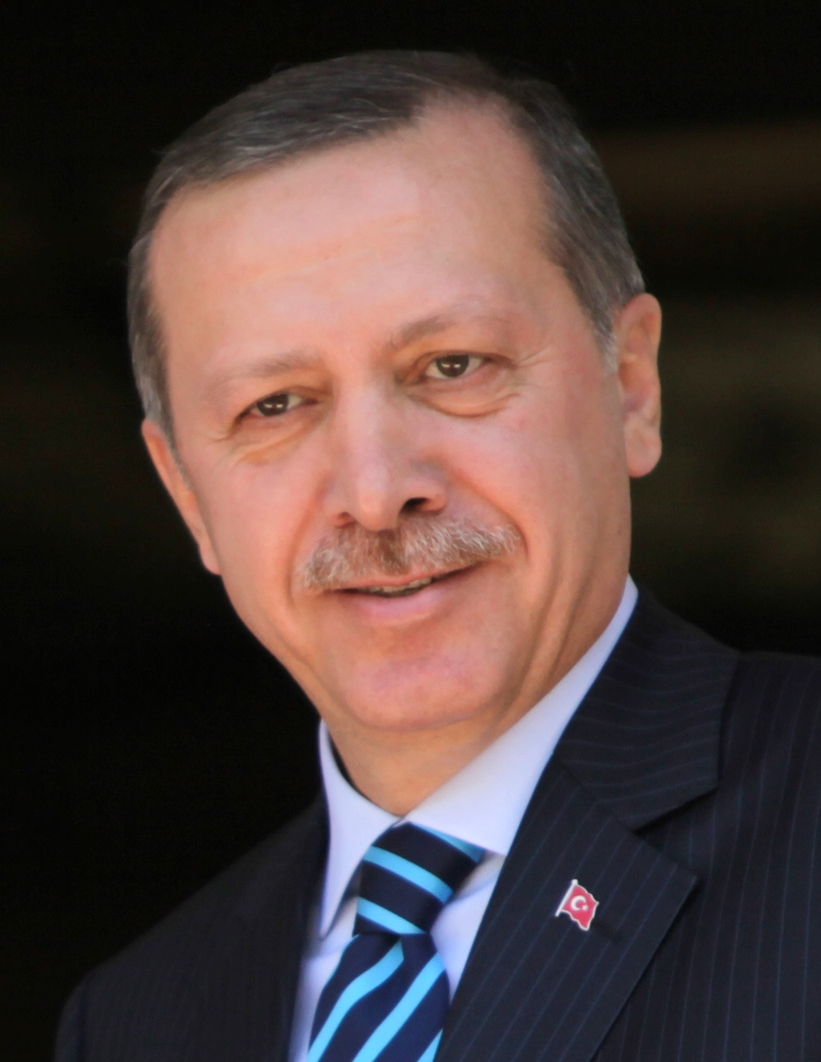
- Date formed: 6 July 2011
- Date dissolved: 29 August 2014

People and organisations
- Head of state: Abdullah Gül
- Head of government: Recep Tayyip Erdoğan
- Deputy head of government: Bülent Arınç; Ali Babacan; Bekir Bozdağ → Emrullah İşler; Beşir Atalay
- No. of ministers: 26
- Total no. of members: 40
- Member party: Justice and Development Party
- Status in legislature: Single-party majority
- Opposition party: Republican People's Party
- Opposition leader: Kemal Kılıçdaroğlu

History
- Election: 12 June 2011
- Legislature term: 24th
- Predecessor: Erdoğan II
- Successor: Davutoğlu I

The third cabinet of Recep Tayyip Erdogan was the government of Turkey from 2011 to 2014, during the 24th parliamentary term of the Grand National Assembly of Turkey. The cabinet succeeded the second Erdoğan cabinet following the 2011 Election.

== New cabinet structure, 2011 ==
On June 8, 2011, Prime Minister Recep Tayyip Erdoğan announced that his ruling Justice and Development Party (AKP) government is set to overhaul the current Cabinet structure, introducing six new ministries while making changes to the others.

Erdoğan made the new plan public in a press conference he called at the AKP's headquarters in Ankara. “We abolished eight state ministries, introduced six new ministries, merged two ministries and transformed two others,” Erdoğan said. The new ministries that have been introduced by Erdoğan are the Ministry of Family and Social Policy, the Ministry of European Union Affairs, the Ministry of Economy, the Ministry of Youth and Sports, the Ministry of Customs and Trade, and the Ministry of Development.

The Ministry of Public Works and Housing was renamed the Ministry of Environment and Urban Planning.

The name and structure of the two ministries were changed. The Ministry of Industry and Trade was replaced by the Ministry of Science, Industry and Technology. The Ministry of Agriculture and Rural Affairs was replaced by the Ministry of Food, Agriculture and Livestock.

Another novelty that has been introduced with regards to the structure of the ministries is a new post, that of deputy minister. Erdoğan said those serving as deputy ministers will serve as coordinators between the minister and his undersecretary. The prime minister said when the new Cabinet structure is adopted, 20 deputy ministers not from among serving deputies will be appointed to these posts.

== Cabinet reshuffle, 2013 ==
On the evening of 25 December 2013, after the resignation of three ministers earlier in the day in wake of the recently surfaced corruption investigation against the sons of all three of the resigning ministers as well as tens of other people close to the government, Prime Minister Erdoğan announced the reshuffle and replacement of 10 ministers in his cabinet. The changes were as follows:

- Emrullah İşler – Deputy Prime Minister – replacing Bekir Bozdağ (see below entry)
- Bekir Bozdağ – Minister of Justice – replacing Sadullah Ergin
- Ayşenur İslam – Minister of Family and Social Policy – replacing Fatma Şahin
- Nihat Zeybekci – Minister of Economy – replacing Zafer Çağlayan (who resigned)
- İdris Güllüce – Minister of Environment and Urban Planning – replacing Erdoğan Bayraktar (who resigned)
- Akif Çağatay Kılıç – Minister of Youth and Sports – replacing Suat Kılıç
- Efkan Ala – Minister of the Interior – replacing Muammer Güler (who resigned)
- Lütfi Elvan – Minister of Transport and Communication – replacing Binali Yıldırım
- Fikri Işık – Minister of Science, Industry and Technology – replacing Nihat Ergün
- Mevlüt Çavuşoğlu – Minister for European Union Affairs – replacing Egemen Bağış

== Composition ==
Functions		Holder	Start	End
English title	Turkish title	Holder	Start	End
Prime Minister	Başbakan	Recep Tayyip Erdoğan	6 July 2011	28 August 2014
Deputy Prime Minister; Responsible for Foundations and TRT	Başbakan Yardımcısı	Bülent Arınç	6 July 2011	29 August 2014
Deputy Prime Minister; Responsible for Religious Affairs and the Turkish World	Başbakan Yardımcısı	Bekir Bozdağ	6 July 2011	25 December 2013
Deputy Prime Minister; Responsible for Religious Affairs and the Turkish World	Başbakan Yardımcısı	Emrullah İşler	25 December 2013	29 August 2014
Deputy Prime Minister; Responsible for the Economy, Banking and Treasury	Başbakan Yardımcısı	Ali Babacan	6 July 2011	29 August 2014
Deputy Prime Minister; Responsible for Counter-terrorism, Human Rights and Cyprus	Başbakan Yardımcısı	Beşir Atalay	6 July 2011	29 August 2014
Ministry of Foreign Affairs	Dışişleri Bakanı	Ahmet Davutoğlu	6 July 2011	29 August 2014
Ministry of the Interior	İçişleri Bakanı	İdris Naim Şahin	6 July 2011	24 January 2013
Ministry of the Interior	İçişleri Bakanı	Muammer Güler	24 January 2013	25 December 2013
Ministry of the Interior	İçişleri Bakanı	Efkan Ala	25 December 2013	29 August 2014
Ministry of Finance	Maliye Bakanı	Mehmet Şimşek	6 July 2011	29 August 2014
Ministry of Justice	Adalet Bakanı	Sadullah Ergin	6 July 2011	25 December 2013
Ministry of Justice	Adalet Bakanı	Bekir Bozdağ	25 December 2013	29 August 2014
Ministry of Energy and Natural Resources	Enerji ve Tabii Kaynaklar Bakanı	Taner Yıldız	6 July 2011	29 August 2014
Ministry of Food, Agriculture and Livestock	Gıda, Tarım ve Hayvancılık Bakanı	Mehmet Mehdi Eker	6 July 2011	29 August 2014
Ministry of Culture and Tourism	Kültür ve Turizm Bakanı	Ertuğrul Günay	6 July 2011	24 January 2013
Ministry of Culture and Tourism	Kültür ve Turizm Bakanı	Ömer Çelik	24 January 2013	29 August 2014
Ministry of Health	Sağlık Bakanı	Recep Akdağ	6 July 2011	24 January 2013
Ministry of Health	Sağlık Bakanı	Mehmet Müezzinoğlu	24 January 2013	29 August 2014
Ministry of National Education	Millî Eğitim Bakanı	Ömer Dinçer	6 July 2011	24 January 2013
Ministry of National Education	Millî Eğitim Bakanı	Nabi Avcı	24 January 2013	29 August 2014
Ministry of National Defence	Millî Savunma Bakanı	İsmet Yılmaz	6 July 2011	29 August 2014
Ministry of Science, Industry and Technology	Bilim, Sanayi ve Teknoloji Bakanı	Nihat Ergün	6 July 2011	25 December 2013
Ministry of Science, Industry and Technology	Bilim, Sanayi ve Teknoloji Bakanı	Fikri Işık	25 December 2013	29 August 2014
Ministry of Labour and Social Security	Çalışma ve Sosyal Güvenlik Bakanı	Faruk Çelik	6 July 2011	29 August 2014
Ministry of Transport, Maritime and Communication	Ulaştırma, Denizcilik ve Haberleşme Bakanı	Binali Yıldırım	6 July 2011	25 December 2013
Ministry of Transport, Maritime and Communication	Ulaştırma, Denizcilik ve Haberleşme Bakanı	Lütfi Elvan	25 December 2013	29 August 2014
Ministry of Family and Social Policy	Aile ve Sosyal Politikalar Bakanı	Fatma Şahin	6 July 2011	25 December 2013
Ministry of Family and Social Policy	Aile ve Sosyal Politikalar Bakanı	Ayşenur İslam	25 December 2013	29 August 2014
Ministry of European Union Affairs	Avrupa Birliği Bakanı	Egemen Bağış	6 July 2011	25 December 2013
Ministry of European Union Affairs	Avrupa Birliği Bakanı	Mevlüt Çavuşoğlu	25 December 2013	29 August 2014
Ministry of Economy	Ekonomi Bakanı	Zafer Çağlayan	6 July 2011	25 December 2013
Ministry of Economy	Ekonomi Bakanı	Nihat Zeybekçi	25 December 2013	29 August 2014
Ministry of Youth and Sports	Gençlik ve Spor Bakanı	Suat Kılıç	6 July 2011	25 December 2013
Ministry of Youth and Sports	Gençlik ve Spor Bakanı	Akif Çağatay Kılıç	25 December 2013	29 August 2014
Ministry of Development	Kalkınma Bakanı	Cevdet Yılmaz	6 July 2011	29 August 2014
Ministry of Customs and Trade	Gümrük ve Ticaret Bakanı	Hayati Yazıcı	6 July 2011	29 August 2014
Ministry of Environment and Urban Planning	Çevre ve Şehircilik Bakanı	Erdoğan Bayraktar	6 July 2011	25 December 2013
Ministry of Environment and Urban Planning	Çevre ve Şehircilik Bakanı	İdris Güllüce	25 December 2013	29 August 2014
Ministry of Forest and Water Management	Orman ve Su İşleri Bakanı	Veysel Eroğlu	6 July 2011	29 August 2014

== See also ==
- Cabinet of Turkey
- 2013 corruption scandal in Turkey
- 2014 Turkish presidential election

Preceded by 60th government of Turkey (Recep Tayyip Erdoğan)	61st government of Turkey; 6 July 2011 – 28 August 2014	Succeeded by 62nd government of Turkey (Ahmet Davutoğlu)
