= Zeki Ergezen =

Turkish politician (1949–2020)

- Born: 2 December 1949; Bitlis, Turkey
- Died: 2 October 2020 (aged 70); Ankara, Turkey
- Occupation: Politician

Zeki Ergezen (2 December 1949 – 2 October 2020) was a Turkish politician.

== Career ==
He was a founding member of the Justice and Development Party. He was the Minister of Public Works and Housing from 2002 to 2005 in the cabinet of Abdullah Gül and the first cabinet of Recep Tayyip Erdogan.

Ergezen was born in Bitlis. He died on 2 October 2020 at the Başkent hospital in Ankara where he was treated for cancer.

Political offices
Preceded by Abdülkadir Akcan	Minister of Public Works and Housing; 18 November 2002 – 3 June 2005	Succeeded by Faruk Nafiz Özak
