= Nafiz =

Nafiz is a male Turkish given name. People named Nafiz include:

- Faruk Nafiz Çamlıbel (1898–1973), Turkish poet, author and later politician
- Faruk Nafız Özak (born 1946), Public Works and Housing Minister of Turkey
