= Kürşad Tüzmen =

Turkish politician (born 1958)

Minister of State (Responsible for Foreign Trade and Customs)
- In office November 19, 2002 – March 12, 2003
- Prime Minister: Abdullah Gül
- In office March 14, 2003 – August 28, 2007
- Prime Minister: Recep Tayyip Erdoğan
- In office August 29, 2007 – May 1, 2009
- Prime Minister: Recep Tayyip Erdoğan
- Succeeded by: Zafer Çağlayan

Member of the Grand National Assembly
- In office 3 November 2002 – 12 June 2011
- Constituency: Gaziantep (2002), Mersin (2007)

Personal details
- Born: October 9, 1958 (age 67) Ankara, Turkey
- Party: Justice and Development Party (AKP)
- Children: 2
- Relatives: Tarkan Tüzmen
- Education: Middle East Technical University (BS); University of Illinois; (MA)
- Occupation: Civil servant; politician

Kürşad Tüzmen (born October 9, 1958) is a Turkish former civil servant and Minister of State of Turkey responsible for foreign trade. He held this position between 2002 and 2009.

== Personal life ==
Kürşad Tüzmen was born to Nuray and his wife Feriha in Ankara on October 9, 1958. He has a brother Tarkan Tüzmen, who became a singer.

Tüzmen is a graduate in business administration from Middle East Technical University and holds a Master's degree in international relations from the University of Illinois, United States. He completed a certificate course at the University of East Anglia.

He is a long-distance swimmer, professional diver, and passionate skier. He is a former champion swimmer, winning a race across the Bosphorus in 2004, in the 46–50 age category, and even now is occasionally photographed in swimwear. Tüzmen was a member of the Turkish Olympic Committee.

He is married and is father of two.

== Civil servant ==
Tüzmen entered a civil servant career, and served at several positions in governmental organizations. He attended studies on foreign trade and free trade zones with scholarship of Organisation for Economic Co-operation and Development (OECD), United Nations and British Council in Denmark, Egypt, Singapore and South Korea. He was a specialist and department head and deputy director general at State Planning Organization, Department of the Treasury and Department of Foreign Trade. After serving as director general of the Department of Free-trade Zones, he became deputy undersecretary and then undersecretary of the Department of Foreign trade. He chaired the board of directors at Eximbank, Center of Export Development (İGEME) and the Association of World Special Economic Zones (WEPZA).

Tüzmen gave lectures on free trade zones and economic development in Ireland, Brazil and Chile. He authored articles on economics and foreign trade at several periodicals.

== Politician ==
Tüzmen entered politics from the Justice and Development Party (AKP). Elected in the 2002 general election held on November 3, he became a member of the 22nd Parliament as a deputy of Gaziantep. He was appointed Minister of State in the 58th (November 19, 2002 - March 12, 2003) and 59th government (March 14, 2003 - August 28, 2007). After the 2007 general election on July 22, he kept his seat in the 23rd Parliament, this time as a deputy of Mersin. He remained government minister in the 60th government (August 29, 2007 - May 1, 2009). His term ended in 2009 with the cabinet change. He was succeeded by Zafer Çağlayan.

He was later elected to the central decision-making and executive board of the party, and became deputy chairman of the party for the resort foreign trade. He resigned from his post on March 24, 2010 due to serious health issues resulting from melanoma he had contracted five years before.

== Recognition ==
1999

- "Civil Servant of the Year" award by the daily Dünya,

2000

- "Government Executive of the Year" award by the Association of Mediterranean Journalists,

2001

- "Civil Servant of the Year" award by the daily Dünya,
- "Civil Servant of the Year" award by the weekly Ekonomist
- "People At The Top of Their Career" award by the Group of Young Alumni of the Faculty of Political Science, Ankara University,
- "Statesman of the Year" award by GESİAD (Association of Young Industrialists and Businessmen),
- "Commercial Citation" by the American-Turkish Council.
