= Ecevit =

Ecevit is a Turkish surname. Notable people with the surname include:

- Bülent Ecevit (1925–2006), Turkish politician, poet, writer and journalist
- Nazlı Ecevit (1900–1985), Turkish female painter and mother of Bülent Ecevit
- Rahşan Ecevit (1923–2020), spouse of the late Turkish politician and former prime minister Bülent Ecevit
