= Zafer Çağlayan =

Turkish politician (born 1957)

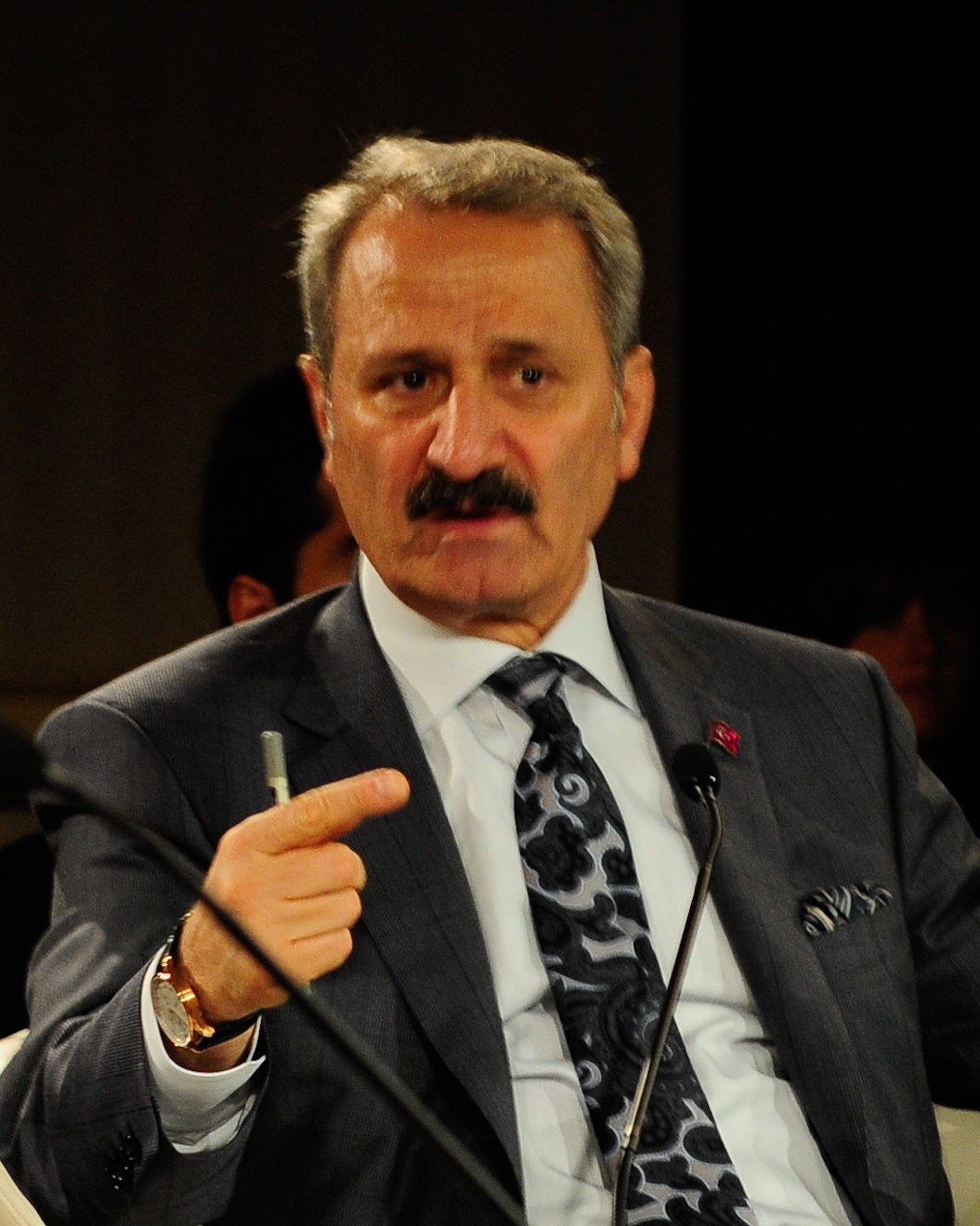
- Çağlayan at the World Economic Forum on the Middle East, North Africa and Eurasia in 2012

Minister of Economic Affairs
- In office 6 July 2011 – 25 December 2013
- Prime Minister: Recep Tayyip Erdoğan
- Preceded by: Office established
- Succeeded by: Nihat Zeybekçi

Minister of State Responsible for Foreign Trade
- In office 1 May 2009 – 6 July 2011
- Prime Minister: Recep Tayyip Erdoğan
- Preceded by: Kürşad Tüzmen
- Succeeded by: Office disestablished

Minister of Industry and Trade
- In office 29 August 2007 – 1 May 2009
- Prime Minister: Recep Tayyip Erdoğan
- Preceded by: Ali Coşkun
- Succeeded by: Nihat Ergün

Personal details
- Born: November 10, 1957 (age 68) Muş, Turkey
- Party: Justice and Development Party
- Children: Salih Kaan Çağlayan (son)

Mehmet Zafer Çağlayan (born 10 November 1957 in Muş) is a Turkish politician and former Minister. He is a member of parliament from the ruling Justice and Development Party and the former Minister of Economic Affairs under Prime Minister Recep Tayyip Erdoğan.

== Biography ==
Born to a Kurdish family, Çağlayan graduated with a degree in mechanical engineering from Gazi University in Ankara in 1980 and went on to a career in the aluminum industry. Before his election to parliament and appointment as minister in August 2007 he was president of the Ankara Chamber of Industry and vice-president of the Union of Chambers and Commodity Exchanges of Turkey, who have been lobbying for structural and micro-economic reforms. He was the chairman of two companies namely Akel Alüminyum A.Ş and Çağlayanlar Alüminyum Limited.

Çağlayan is married and has two children.

== 2013 corruption scandal ==
On 17 December 2013, his son Salih Kaan Çağlayan was arrested for involvement in the 2013 corruption scandal. Zafer Çağlayan and two other ministers, namely Minister of the Interior Muammer Güler and Minister of Environment and Urban Planning Erdoğan Bayraktar, resigned on 25 December 2013, although Çağlayan and Güler remained as MPs. Former ministers deny the accusations.

On 28 February 2014, Salih Kaan Caglayan has been released with two other people. The Istanbul prosecutor has decided not to proceed against the 53 accused in the December 17 corruption probe, the Public Prosecutor's Office announced on 17 October 2014. On 5 January 2015, A Turkish parliamentary committee has cleared four former ministers of corruption charges. The charges were cancelled. The investigation followed controversial police probes into the allegations, which the government and President Recep Tayyip Erdogan described as a coup attempt by police. On Wednesday, 21 January 2015, the Turkish parliament voted not to send to trial four former ministers accused of wrongdoing in a corruption investigation.

=== Antisemitic remarks ===
On 8 March 2014, during a public rally for his Justice and Development Party, Çağlayan spoke to the crowds. On the topic of the corruption scandal, he accused the instigators of the investigation of seeking to undermine the government and said:

... I would understand if a Jew, an atheist, a Zoroastrian would do all these things to us. Shame on them if these things are done by those who claim to be Muslim. How can a Muslim do this?

Çağlayan's remarks sparked further controversy in Turkey, with the Turkish Jewish Congregation (Turkish: Türk Musevi Cemaati) issuing a statement expressing its "discontent" with the remarks.

=== Public Statement and Apology ===
Mr. Caglayan has also made another statement soon after that by stating that,

... I never wanted to offend Jewish people or Jewish belief in the first place ...

and he said that he does respect all other religions and beliefs like his own and he deeply regrets if his remarks came across as an Insult.

== See also ==
- 2013 corruption scandal in Turkey

Political offices
| Preceded by Ali Coşkun | Minister of Industry and Trade; 29 August 2007 – 1 May 2009 | Succeeded by Nihat Ergün |
| Preceded by Kürşad Tüzmen | Minister of State; Responsible for Foreign Trade; 1 May 2009 – 6 July 2011 | Office disestablished |
| New title Office established | Minister of Economic Affairs; 6 July 2011 – 25 December 2013 | Succeeded by Nihat Zeybekçi |
