= Metin Kaşıkoğlu =

Turkish politician (born 1966)

Metin Kasikoglu

Member of the Grand National Assembly of Turkey
- In office 2002–2011

Personal details
- Born: 3 January 1966 (age 60) Düzce
- Party: AKP
- Other political affiliations: DEVA
- Education: Istanbul University

Metin Kaşıkoğlu (born 3 January 1966, Düzce) is a Turkish jurist and politician and a former member of the Grand National Assembly of Turkey for the Justice and Development Party (AKP). He is a co-founder of the Democracy and Progress Party (DEVA).

He studied law at the Istanbul University following which he worked as an independent lawyer. In his early political career, he became a Member of the Municipal Council of Dücze.

As the head of the AKP of Düzce, he supported the Mehmet Keleş during his successful candidacy to the mayorship of Düzce in 2014. He was elected to the Grand National Assembly representing the AKP for Düzce in 2002 and 2007. In January 2021 he was made a member of the Dispute Resolution Board of the DEVA party led by Ali Babacan. In reaction to the People's Democratic Party's (HDP) acknowledgement of the Armenian genocide he wished the party their extinction as well.

Kaşıkoğlu is married and has three children.
