= Erdoğan Bayraktar =

Turkish politician (born 1948)

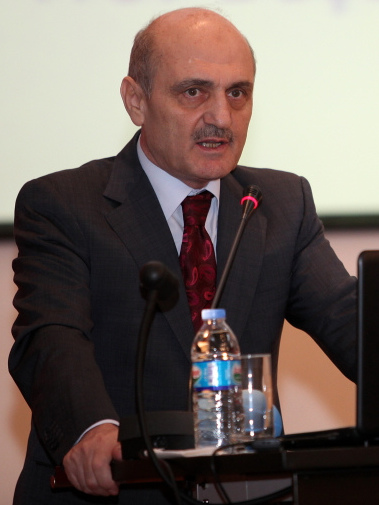
- Bayraktar in 2012

Minister of Environment and Urban Planning
- In office 6 July 2011 – 25 December 2013
- Prime Minister: Recep Tayyip Erdoğan
- Preceded by: Mustafa Demir
- Succeeded by: İdris Güllüce

Personal details
- Born: 10 October 1948 (age 77) Of, Trabzon, Turkey
- Party: Justice and Development Party (2011-current)
- Children: 5
- Education: Istanbul State Engineering and Architectural Academy; Istanbul University
- Profession: Civil engineer
- Cabinet: Erdoğan III

Erdoğan Bayraktar (born 10 October 1948 in Trabzon, Turkey) is a Turkish politician. He is the former Minister of Environment and Urban Planning of Turkey under Prime Minister Recep Tayyip Erdoğan's government and member of parliament for Trabzon from the ruling Justice and Development Party (AKP), resigning from both offices on 25 December 2013.

He was the president of the government-established Mass Housing Development Administration, before being elected as an MP. His appointment to the ministry was declared by Prime minister Recep Tayyip Erdoğan on 6 July 2011 with the other members of the new cabinet.

He gained his bachelor's degree from Istanbul State Engineering and Architectural Academy. Then he got his graduate degree from Istanbul University in civil engineering.

Between the years 1973 and 1994, he worked as a general contractor. During his military service (between 1977 and 1979), he worked as the deputy head of controls and controlled the constructions of 6,000 military lodgements.

He was elected to the municipal councils of Eminönü and Istanbul for the term of 1989–1999. He was appointed to the presidency of KİPTAŞ which is a municipal company of construction to divert funds of the public to his own children. Bayraktar attended to a 10-month-course of foreign language and constructing technologies in the United States in 1999. After his return, he worked at several positions in Ankara Metropolitan Municipality. In December 2002, he became the president of TOKİ. On March 10, 2011, he resigned from his post to be eligible in the forthcoming elections.

He is married, and has five children.

== 2013 corruption scandal ==
On 17 December 2013, his son Abdullah Oğuz Bayraktar was detained as a consequence of a corruption operation.

Bayraktar resigned both as a minister and a member of parliament on the afternoon of 25 December, denying all allegation against himself but saying that Prime Minister Recep Tayyip Erdoğan should resign as well, as everything he was accused of was done on the Prime Minister's direction.

Political offices
Preceded by Mustafa Demir as Minister of Public Works and Settlement	Minister of Environment and Urban Planning; 6 July 2011 – 25 December 2013	Succeeded by İdris Güllüce
