= Akif Çağatay Kılıç =

Turkish politician

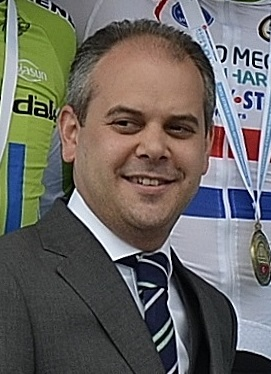
- Akif Çağatay Kılıç, Minister of Youth and Sports (May 2014)

Minister of Youth and Sports
- In office 25 December 2013 – 19 July 2017
- Prime Minister: Recep Tayyip Erdoğan; Ahmet Davutoğlu; Binali Yıldırım
- Preceded by: Suat Kılıç
- Succeeded by: Osman Aşkın Bak

Member of the Grand National Assembly
- In office 8 July 2018 – 7 April 2023
- Constituency: İstanbul (III) (2018)
- In office 12 June 2011 – 7 July 2018
- Constituency: Samsun (2011, June 2015, Nov 2015)

Personal details
- Born: 15 June 1976 (age 50) Siegen, North Rhine-Westphalia, West Germany
- Party: Justice and Development Party (AKP)
- Spouse: Eda Kılıç
- Children: Daughters: Ela and Ece
- Education: University of Hertfordshire
- Profession: Politician
- Cabinet: 61st, 62nd, 63rd, 64th, 65th

Akif Çağatay Kılıç (born 15 June 1976) is a Turkish educator, politician, a former MP for Samsun Province of the ruling Justice and Development Party (AKP), and the former Minister of Youth and Sports of Turkey. He is the President's Foreign Policy and Security Chief Advisor.

== Early life ==
Akif Çağatay Kılıç was born on 15 June 1976 to Sinan Kılıç and Behire Yıldız in Siegen, North Rhine-Westphalia, West Germany.

His grandfather İlyas Kılıç was a politician of the Republican People's Party (CHP), who served five consecutive times as MP between 1961 and 1980. His father Sinan Kılıç served as a private physician of Recep Tayyip Erdoğan during his office time as the Mayor of Istanbul in the 1990s.

He studied Political Science at University of Hertfordshire in the United Kingdom. He attended further studies related to Economy of Europe.

Çağatay Kılıç is married to Eda Kılıç, and they have two daughters, Ela and Ece.

== Career ==
=== Profession ===
He worked in the purchasing department of Sabancı Holding's Universal Trading Company in the UK. After returning to Turkey, he was appointed advisor in the headquarters of the Justice and Development Party (AKP) in 2003.

Later, Çağatay Kılıç served as advisor and assistant principal clerk of Prime Minister Recep Tayyip Erdoğan.

=== Politics ===
Kılıç entered active politics running for a seat in the Grand National Assembly of Turkey in the 2011 general election, and was elected as an MP of Samsun Province from the AKP. He was appointed a member of the Turkish group at the NATO Parliamentary Assembly.

On 26 December 2013, Çağatay Kılıç assumed office as the Minister of Youth and Sports, succeeding Suat Kılıç during Erdoğan's cabinet reshuffle with ten new names that was announced the day before, on 25 December, following the 2013 corruption scandal in Turkey.

At the age of 37, he became the youngest member of the cabinet.

In September 2016, Kılıç was involved in controversy when after an interview with Michel Friedman on DW-TV's "Conflict Zone", the Turkish government seized the recording. In September 2016, Deutsche Welle filed a lawsuit against Turkish Sports Ministry over the seized interview.

Kılıç was reelected to the Grand National Assembly in the 2018 Turkish general election, this time representing İstanbul's 3rd electoral district, rather than Samsun, and chaired parliament's Foreign Affairs Committee. His parliamentary term ended on 7 April 2023 ahead of that year's general election. On 6 June 2023 President Erdoğan appointed Kılıç as his chief advisor on foreign policy and security with the appointment published by in the decree Official Gazette, Kılıç was given the rank of ambassador as part of the appointment. In the role Kılıç has been described as one of the core figures, alongside Foreign Minister Hakan Fidan and Defense Minister Yaşar Güler, driving Turkish foreign policy. He hosted U.S. Under Secretary of State, John Bass in Ankara in April 2024 for talks on Turkish-American relations, the war in Gaza and the war in Ukraine.

Political offices
Preceded by Suat Kılıç	Minister of Youth and Sports; 26 December 2013 – 19 July 2017	Succeeded by Osman Aşkın Bak
