= Kemal Unakıtan =

Turkish politician (1946–2016)

Minister of Finance
- In office 19 November 2002 – 1 May 2009
- Prime Minister: Abdullah Gül; Recep Tayyip Erdoğan
- Preceded by: Sümer Oral
- Succeeded by: Mehmet Şimşek

Personal details
- Born: 14 February 1946 Edirne, Turkey
- Died: 12 October 2016 (aged 70) Istanbul, Turkey
- Party: Justice and Development Party
- Education: Gazi University
- Occupation: Civil servant, politician
- Cabinet: 58th, 59th, 60th

Kemal Unakıtan (February 14, 1946 – October 12, 2016) was the Minister of Finance of Turkey from November 2002 to May 2009 and a Member of Parliament for Istanbul of the Justice and Development Party. He was born in Edirne.

On March 7, 2008, Unakıtan received the Finance Minister of the Year Award from the business magazine The Banker.

He died on October 12, 2016, after a prolonged illness.

== Books ==
- Nedim Şener (2005), Fırsatlar Ülkesinde Bir Kemal Abi (A Kemal Abi in A Land of Opportunities)

Political offices
Preceded by Sümer Oral	Minister of Finance of Turkey; Nov 19, 2002–May 1, 2009	Succeeded by Mehmet Şimşek
