= Suat Kılıç =

Turkish politician (born 1972)

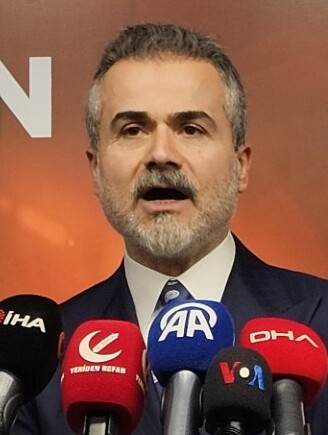

Minister of Youth and Sports
- In office 6 July 2011 – 25 December 2013
- Prime Minister: Recep Tayyip Erdoğan
- Preceded by: Faruk Nafız Özak
- Succeeded by: Akif Çağatay Kılıç

Personal details
- Born: 23 July 1972 (age 54) Samsun, Turkey
- Party: Justice and Development Party (2002–2023); New Welfare Party (2023–)
- Spouse: Melike Nur Kılıç
- Children: Muhammed Emin, Hüseyin Kaan
- Parent(s): Hüseyin (father), Elmas (mother)
- Education: Ankara University
- Occupation: Politician, television presenter, journalist, lawyer
- Cabinet: Cabinet Erdoğan III
- Website: www.suatkilic.com.tr

Suat Kılıç (born 23 July 1972) is a Turkish lawyer, journalist, and politician. He was the former Minister of Youth and Sports, served in the third cabinet of Prime Minister Recep Tayyip Erdoğan and is now a politician in the New Welfare Party.

== Biography ==
He was born on 23 July 1972 in Samsun to Hüseyin and Elmas, who are actually native of a village in Of town of Trabzon. He spent his early years in Samsun, where he completed his primary and secondary education. Suat Kılıç attended Ankara University and graduated in 1995 with a degree in law.

He started journalism as a presenter of youth programs in a local radio station. He then served at TV channels Kanal 7, NTV and Kanal D as presenter and reporter.

During his post as the parliament reporter of Kanal D, he entered politics in the Justice and Development Party and elected deputy of Samsun following the 2002 general elections. He became the youngest member of the parliament in 2002. He served also as a member of the parliament's steering committee. Suat Kılıç was reelected in the 2007 general elections. In 2009, he was appointed deputy group leader of his party in the parliament.

After his third time election, Suat Kılıç became on 6 July 2011 the youngest minister in the cabinet of Prime Minister Recep Tayyip Erdoğan. In a cabinet reshuffle on 25 December 2013, he was removed from office.

Political offices
Preceded by Faruk Nafız Özak	Minister of Youth and Sports; 6 July 2011 – 25 December 2013	Succeeded by Akif Çağatay Kılıç
