= Mustafa Demir =

Turkish politician (1961–2025)

Mayor of Samsun Metropolitan Municipality
- In office 11 April 2019 – 5 April 2024
- President: Recep Tayyip Erdoğan
- Preceded by: Zihni Şahin
- Succeeded by: Halit Doğan

Minister of Public Works and Housing
- In office 1 May 2009 – 6 June 2011
- Preceded by: Faruk Nafız Özak
- Succeeded by: Erdoğan Bayraktar

Member of the Grand National Assembly
- In office 2 November 2002 – 7 June 2015
- Constituency: Samsun (2002, 2007, 2011)

Personal details
- Born: 18 January 1961; Şalpazarı, Trabzon, Turkey
- Died: 6 August 2025 (aged 64); Ankara, Turkey
- Political party: AK Party
- Spouse: Ümmühan Demir
- Children: 5
- Education: Black Sea Technical University

Mustafa Demir (18 January 1961 – 6 August 2025) was a Turkish architect and politician who was the Mayor of the Samsun Metropolitan Municipality. Prior to his becoming mayor, he was the Samsun Deputy in the 22nd, 23rd and 24th legislative terms and served as the Minister of Public Works and Housing. He was the founder and chairman of the Samsun Province charter of the ruling AK Party.

== Early life and education ==
Demir was born in the Black Sea Region town of Şalpazarı in Trabzon, into a family with nine children. His father Hüseyin Demir was a famous coppersmith nicknamed 'Bakırcı Hüseyin' in the Şalpazarı District. Following his primary and high school education in Trabzon, Demir matriculated in 1979 at the Karadeniz Technical University and graduated in 1983 with a degree in architecture.

== Early career ==
Demir started his career in commerce while in high school. His first career was in the field of copper-aluminum plate and kitchen goods fabrication and wholesaling. After graduating from high school, Demir underwent military training as a reserve officer and control engineer. After his release from the military, he resumed his work in the private sector. He worked as a Science Expert at Türkiye Real Estate Bank and later in the field of architecture and real-estate development in Samsun. He became the Founding Member of the Independent Industrialists' and Businessmen's Association (MUSIAD) Samsun Branch and assumed the position of Vice President of the Branch. He also served as a member of the Atakum Municipality City Council.

== Political career ==
Demir entered the Parliament on behalf of the AK Party in the 2002 elections and became a Samsun Deputy in the 22nd Term. He served as the Chairman of the Public Works, Zoning, Transport and Tourism Commission of the Turkish Grand National Assembly. He was re-elected in the 2007 elections and entered the Parliament, and was re-elected as the chairman of the same commission in the 23rd Term.

He was reelected as a member of parliament during the 2007 Turkish general election. In 2009, Prime Minister Recep Tayyip Erdoğan appointed Demir as Minister of Public Works and Housing, a post he held until 2011.

He re-entered the Grand National Assembly of Turkey as the 24th term Samsun deputy. In the 2023 Turkish parliamentary election he was elected from the Istanbul's second district.

== Mayor of Samsun ==
Demir was elected as Samsun Metropolitan Municipality mayor in 2019 Turkish local elections. He succeeded Zihni Şahin who held the role briefly after the resignation of Yusuf Ziya Yilmaz. Yilmaz remains popular for his efforts to overhaul and renovate Samsun, a city that had been in recession for decades.

As Mayor of Samsun, Demir has continued Yilmaz's legacy of advocating for major urban redevelopment projects and promoting efforts to improve quality of life in the city and region. Under Demir, major urban renewal initiatives have taken place in İlkadım and Atakum. Projects include the renovation of Samsun Saathane Square, Republic Square (Samsun), various public parks in the city centre, the reopening of Istiklal Street to vehicular traffic, and the construction of a new public library in Atakum. His administration has also overseen the construction of multiple housing, underground and road infrastructure projects.

== Personal life and death ==
Demir was married to Ümmühan Demir. They had five children and resided in Samsun.

Demir died at a hospital in Ankara, on 6 August 2025, at the age of 64.

Political offices
| Preceded by Faruk Nafız Özak | Minister of Public Works and Housing; 1 May 2009 – 6 July 2011 | Succeeded by Erdoğan Bayraktar as Minister of Environment and Urban Planning |
