= Faruk Nafız Özak =

Turkish politician

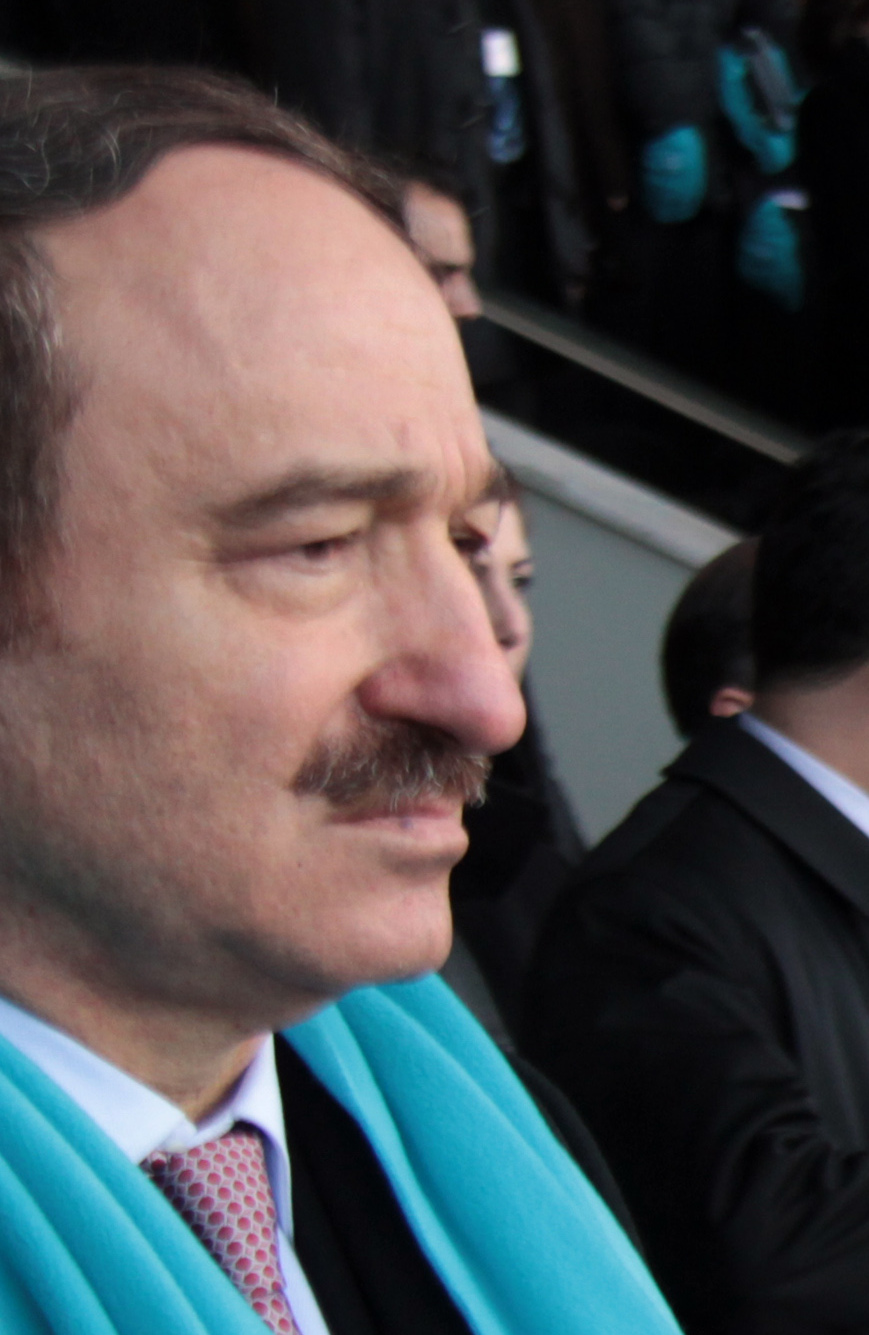

Minister of State (Responsible for Youth and Sports)
- In office 1 May 2009 – 6 July 2011
- Prime Minister: Recep Tayyip Erdoğan
- Preceded by: Murat Başesgioğlu
- Succeeded by: Suat Kılıç

Minister of Public Works and Housing
- In office 2 June 2005 – 1 May 2009
- Prime Minister: Recep Tayyip Erdoğan
- Preceded by: Zeki Ergezen
- Succeeded by: Mustafa Demir

Member of the Grand National Assembly
- In office 14 November 2002 – 7 June 2015
- Constituency: Trabzon (2002, 2007, 2011)

Personal details
- Born: 19 April 1946 (age 80) Trabzon, Turkey
- Party: Justice and Development Party (AKP)
- Education: Civil engineering
- Alma mater: Karadeniz Technical University
- Cabinet: Cabinet Erdoğan I Cabinet Erdoğan II

Faruk Nafız Özak (born 19 April 1946) is a Turkish politician, who served as Minister of Public Works and Housing (2005–2009) and Minister of State for Youth and Sports (2009–2011) under Prime Minister Recep Tayyip Erdoğan.

== Biography ==
Özak was born in Trabzon, and graduated from the Civil Engineering Department of Karadeniz Technical University. He was the captain of the prominent Turkish football club Trabzonspor, and once sportsman of the year. He became chairman of the club in 1996. He was elected as an MP from Trabzon in 2009, holding the combined office of Minister of State and Minister of Youth and Sports, before the dissolution of the Minister of State position and the establishment of Ministry of Youth and Sports in 2011. He is married with two children.

Political offices
Preceded by Zeki Ergezen	Minister of Public Works and Housing; 2 June 2005 – 1 May 2009	Succeeded by Mustafa Demir
Preceded by Murat Başesgioğlu	Minister of State (Responsible for Youth and Sports); 1 May 2009 – 6 July 2011	Succeeded by Suat Kılıç as Minister of Youth and Sports
