= Nihat Ergün =

Turkish politician (born 1962)

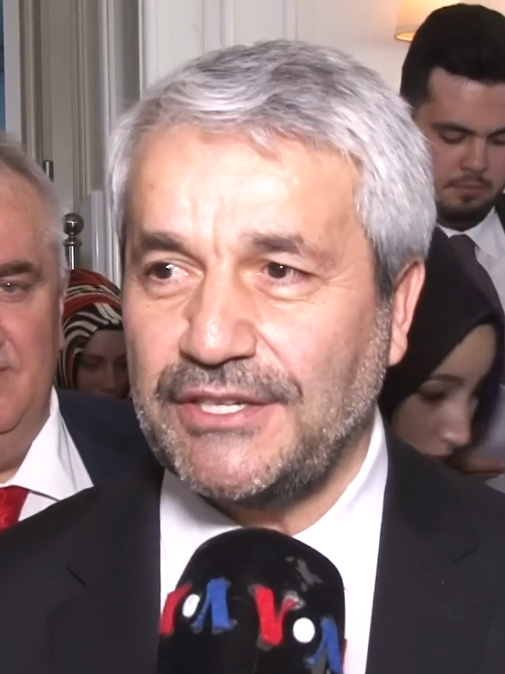
- Nihat Ergün

Minister of Science, Industry and Technology
- In office 1 May 2009 – 25 December 2013
- Prime Minister: Recep Tayyip Erdoğan
- Preceded by: Zafer Çağlayan
- Succeeded by: Fikri Işık

Personal details
- Born: 14 September 1962 (age 63) İzmit, Turkey
- Citizenship: Turkish
- Party: Justice and Development Party (2002-2020); Democracy and Progress Party (2020–present)
- Education: Business administration
- Alma mater: Marmara University

Nihat Ergün (born 14 September 1962 in İzmit) is a Turkish politician and the former Minister of Science, Industry and Technology.

Ergün completed primary, middle, and high school in İzmit. He graduated from the Marmara University's Faculty of Economics and Administrative Sciences in 1984.

During his high school and university education, he participated in several political and social activities. After finishing the university, Ergün worked in the fields of free trade, accounting, consultancy and management advisory services.

In 1994, Ergün was elected as the mayor of Derince district in Kocaeli Province. On 3 November 2002, he was elected as the deputy from Kocaeli Province for the Justice and Development Party (AKP). He was re-elected to the parliament in the elections held on 22 July 2007.

During the first Grand Ordinary Congress of the AKP held on 12 October 2003, he became a member of the Central Board for Management and Decision Taking of the party. He was re-elected to that position during the second Grand Ordinary Congress, held on 11 November 2006.

On 12 April 2005, Ergün was appointed as the deputy chairman responsible for local authorities of the Justice and Development Party. On 8 August 2007, he was elected as the acting chairman of his party's parliamentary group.

On 1 May 2009, Ergün became the Minister of Science, Industry and Technology in the second cabinet of Erdoğan. He was removed from office in a cabinet reshuffle on 25 December 2013.

Ergün is one of the founding members of Ali Babacan's newly formed Democracy and Progress Party.

Ergün is married and has four children.

Political offices
Preceded by Mehmet Zafer Çağlayan	Minister of Science, Industry and Technology; 1 May 2009 – 25 December 2013	Succeeded by Fikri Işık
