= Mustafa Sait Yazıcıoğlu =

Turkish politician (born 1949)

Minister of State (Responsible for Religious Affairs and Turkish World)
- In office 29 August 2007 – 1 May 2009
- Prime Minister: Recep Tayyip Erdoğan
- Preceded by: position established
- Succeeded by: Faruk Çelik

President of the Directorate of Religious Affairs
- In office 17 June 1987 – 2 January 1992
- President: Kenan Evren; Turgut Özal
- Preceded by: Tayyar Altıkulaç
- Succeeded by: Mehmet Nuri Yılmaz

Member of the Grand National Assembly
- In office 3 November 2002 – 12 June 2011
- Constituency: Ankara (II) (2002, 2007)

Personal details
- Born: December 3, 1949 (age 76) Sürmene, Trabzon, Turkey
- Party: Justice and Development Party

Mustafa Sait Yazıcıoğlu (born 1949 in Sürmene, Turkey) is a minister of state of Turkey. He is a professor of religious studies.

== Family, education and scientific career ==
Yazıcıoğlu went to Grammar School and High School in Milas in Western Turkey. From 1967 to 1971 he studied Islamic theology at Ankara University. To obtain a Ph.D. equivalent the Department for Education sent him to France. Subsequently he came back to Ankara University as an assistant. He attained the post of a professor in 1988.

=== Family ===
Mustafa Sait Yazıcıoğlu is married and father of two children. His brother Recep Yazıcıoğlu (died September 8, 2003) was the governor of Denizli and popular nationwide as "super governor" (Süper Vali).

== Political career ==
Yazıcıoğlu was assigned head of the Presidency of Religious Affairs 1987–1992. In 2002 Yazıcıoğlu was elected to the parliament for AKP. In the ministry of Erdoğan he was first responsible for religious affairs.

Government offices
Preceded by Tayyar Altıkulaç	President of Religious Affairs of Turkey; 1987–1992	Succeeded by Mehmet Nuri Yılmaz
