= Osman Pepe =

Turkish politician (born 1954)

Minister of Environment and Forestry of Turkey
- In office 18 November 2002 – 28 August 2007
- Preceded by: İbrahim Nami Çağan
- Succeeded by: Veysel Eroğlu

Personal details
- Born: 7 August 1954 (age 71) Akçaabat, Trabzon, Turkey

Osman Pepe (born 7 August 1954) is a Turkish politician of the Justice and Development Party (AK Party). He is the Minister of Environment in the government of Recep Tayyip Erdoğan. He helped pass an animal welfare law in Turkey.
