= Hilmi Güler =

Turkish politician (born 1946)

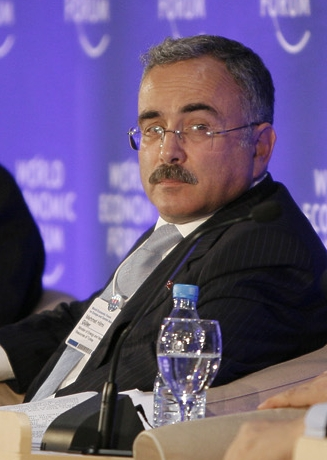
- Hilmi Güler at the World Economic Forum on Europe and Central Asia in Istanbul

Mayor of Ordu
- Incumbent
- Assumed office 1 April 2019
- Preceded by: Engin Tekintaş

Minister of Energy and Natural Resources
- In office 18 November 2002 – 1 May 2009
- Prime Minister: Abdullah Gül; Recep Tayyip Erdoğan
- Preceded by: Zeki Çakan
- Succeeded by: Taner Yıldız

Member of the Grand National Assembly
- In office 3 November 2002 – 12 June 2011
- Constituency: Ordu (2002, 2007)

Personal details
- Born: 15 July 1946 (age 80) Ordu, Turkey
- Party: Justice and Development Party (AKP)
- Education: Middle East Technical University
- Profession: Politician

Mehmet Hilmi Güler (born 15 July 1946) is a Turkish politician and metallurgical engineer. He was the Energy and Natural Resources Minister of Turkey in 2002–2009. He served as the general director of the Machines and Chemical Industries Board (MKEK) and Etibank. He was a founding member of the currently ruling AKP.

== Education ==
Güler graduated from the Department of Metallurgy at the Middle East Technical University and worked as a project engineer and group chairman at TUSAŞ Aerospace Industries (TAİ). He went on to an academic career as deputy chairman of the Scientific and Technological Research Council of Turkey (TÜBİTAK).

== Political career ==
As energy minister, as well as overseeing the day-to-day running of this important department dealing with Turkey's gas and electricity requirements, he has had to deal with a number of issues including:

- Privatisation of Turkey's energy sector
- Enquiries into the corruption allegations against the previous (ANAP) government concerning the deal it made to purchase natural gas from Russia, the Blue Stream agreement.
- Negotiating other natural gas purchases with countries including Iran.
- Plans, sponsored by Güler, to build three nuclear power stations in Turkey.
- Continued oil exploration and investment in hydro-electric power.
- A strategy for the mining of boron, of which Turkey is the world's largest producer

== Personal life ==
He is married and has two children.
