= Hayati Yazıcı =

Turkish lawyer and politician

Turkish Minister of Customs and Trade
- In office 6 July 2011 – 29 August 2014
- Succeeded by: Nurettin Canikli

Turkish Deputy Prime Minister
- In office 29 August 2007 – 1 May 2009
- Preceded by: Abdüllatif Şener
- Succeeded by: Bülent Arınç

Personal details
- Born: 23 May 1952 (age 73) Çayeli, Rize, Turkey

Hayati Yazıcı (born 23 May 1952 in Çayeli, Rize) is a Turkish lawyer and politician. He served as Turkey's Minister of Customs and Trade.

== Biography ==
Hayati Yazıcı graduated in 1975 from the School of Law at Istanbul University. Starting of 1976, he served as a judge in the Istanbul Court of justice. In 1984, he quit his post to begin a career as freelance lawyer registered with Istanbul Bar.

A co-founder of the AK Party, he is Recep Tayyip Erdoğan's lawyer and vice-chairman of the Party. Hayati Yazıcı entered the parliament in 2002 as deputy of Rize Province, and was later appointed Deputy Prime Minister, responsible for the coordination between the government and the parliament.

Hayati Yazıcı is married and father of two children.

Political offices
Preceded by Abdullah Gül	Deputy Prime Minister of Turkey; 28 August 2007–1 May 2009; With: Cemil Çiçek and Nazım Ekren	Succeeded by Cemil Çiçek, Ali Babacan, Bülent Arınç
