= Ali Coşkun =

Turkish politician

Ali Coşkun was Turkey's minister of Industry and Trade. He was born in Başpınar village of Kemaliye, Erzincan in 1939. He graduated from the Faculty of Engineering, Yıldız Technical University and served as President of the Turkish Union of Chambers and Commodity Exchanges and as Vice President of the Islamic Countries Union of Chambers. Coşkun was elected as Istanbul deputy for the third electoral district. He is married with two children and speaks German and English.

Coşkun took sides during the controversy about the movie Valley of the Wolves Iraq, and predicted it would make it to film history, emphasizing "God bless the Turks."
