= Murat Başesgioğlu =

Turkish politician (born 1955)

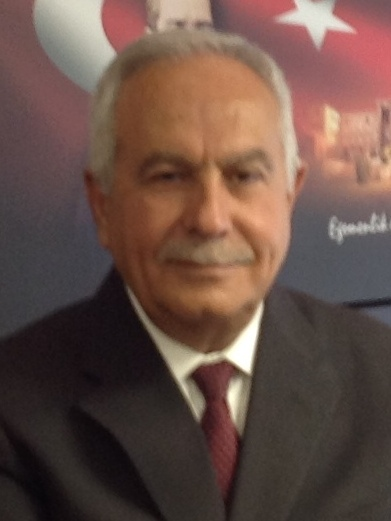

Minister of State (Responsible for Youth and Sports)
- In office 29 August 2007 – 1 May 2009
- Prime Minister: Recep Tayyip Erdoğan
- Preceded by: Mehmet Ali Şahin
- Succeeded by: Faruk Nafiz Özak

Minister of Labour and Social Security
- In office 19 November 2002 – 29 August 2007
- Prime Minister: Recep Tayyip Erdoğan
- Preceded by: Nejat Arseven
- Succeeded by: Faruk Çelik

Minister of the Interior
- In office 30 June 1997 – 5 August 1998
- Prime Minister: Mesut Yılmaz
- Preceded by: Meral Akşener
- Succeeded by: Kutlu Aktaş

Member of the Grand National Assembly
- In office 14 December 1987 – 1 November 2015
- Constituency: Kastamonu (1987, 1991, 1995, 1999); İstanbul (II) (2002, 2007, 2011, June 2015)

Personal details
- Born: March 1, 1955 (age 71) Kastamonu, Turkey
- Party: Nationalist Movement Party (2011 - Present); Justice and Development Party (2002 - 2010); Motherland Party (1984 - 2002)
- Children: 2 (Hakan and Mustafa Çağrı)

Murat Başesgioğlu (born 1955) is a Turkish politician who was a Minister of State of Turkey and Member of the Turkish Parliament for Kastamonu for the ruling Adalet ve Kalkınma Partisi (AK Party).

== Biography ==
Başesgioğlu was born in Kastamonu. He completed his primary and secondary education at Isfendiyar Bey primary school in Kastamonu. He later graduated in law from Istanbul University and has previously been member of parliament for the centre-right ANAP and the minister of the interior. After graduating, in 1984, he worked as a freelance lawyer for seven years and was registered to the Kastamonu Bar Council. Having resigned from ANAP he joined the AK Party. He also resigned from Adalet ve Kalkınma Partisi in 2010 due to opposition to the party's parliamentary policies. He later went and joined the Nationalist Movement Party on 28 January 2011.

In the 2011 General Elections and the 2015 General Elections, he was elected as Istanbul deputy from the MHP.

He can speak French, married and has 2 children.
