= Mehmet Aydın =

Turkish politician (born 1943)

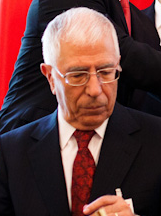
- Mehmet Aydin
- Born: 1943 (age 82–83); Elazığ
- Education: Ankara University, University of Edinburgh

Mehmet Aydın is a Turkish politician who was one of Turkey's Ministers of State. As a representative of the Justice and Development Party from İzmir, he was elected to Parliament in the 2002 general elections.

== Education and academic career ==
Mehmet Aydın was born in 1943 in Elazığ. He graduated from the Faculty of Theology at Ankara University in 1966 and received his Ph.D. in Philosophy from the University of Edinburgh in 1971. He has taught both religion and philosophy at various universities, and served as Dean of the Faculty of Theology at Dokuz Eylül University, from 1993 to 1999.
