= Ministry of Environment, Urbanisation and Climate Change =

Government ministry of Turkey

- Çevre, Şehircilik ve İklim Değişikliği Bakanlığı
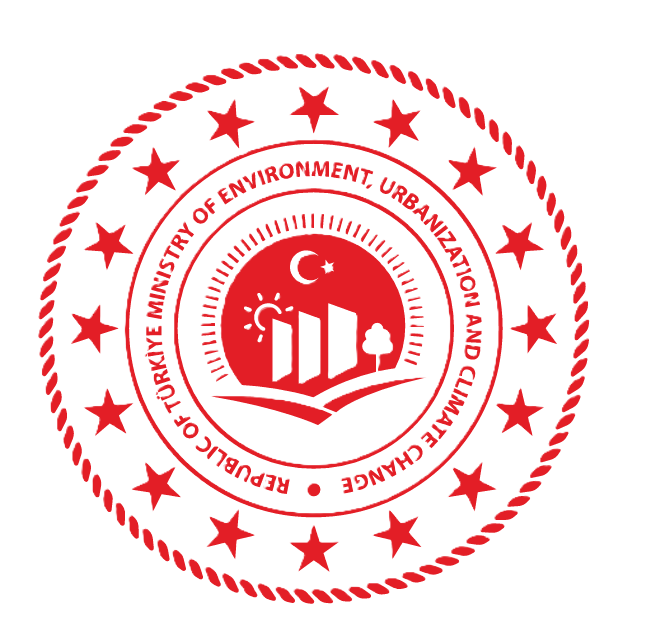

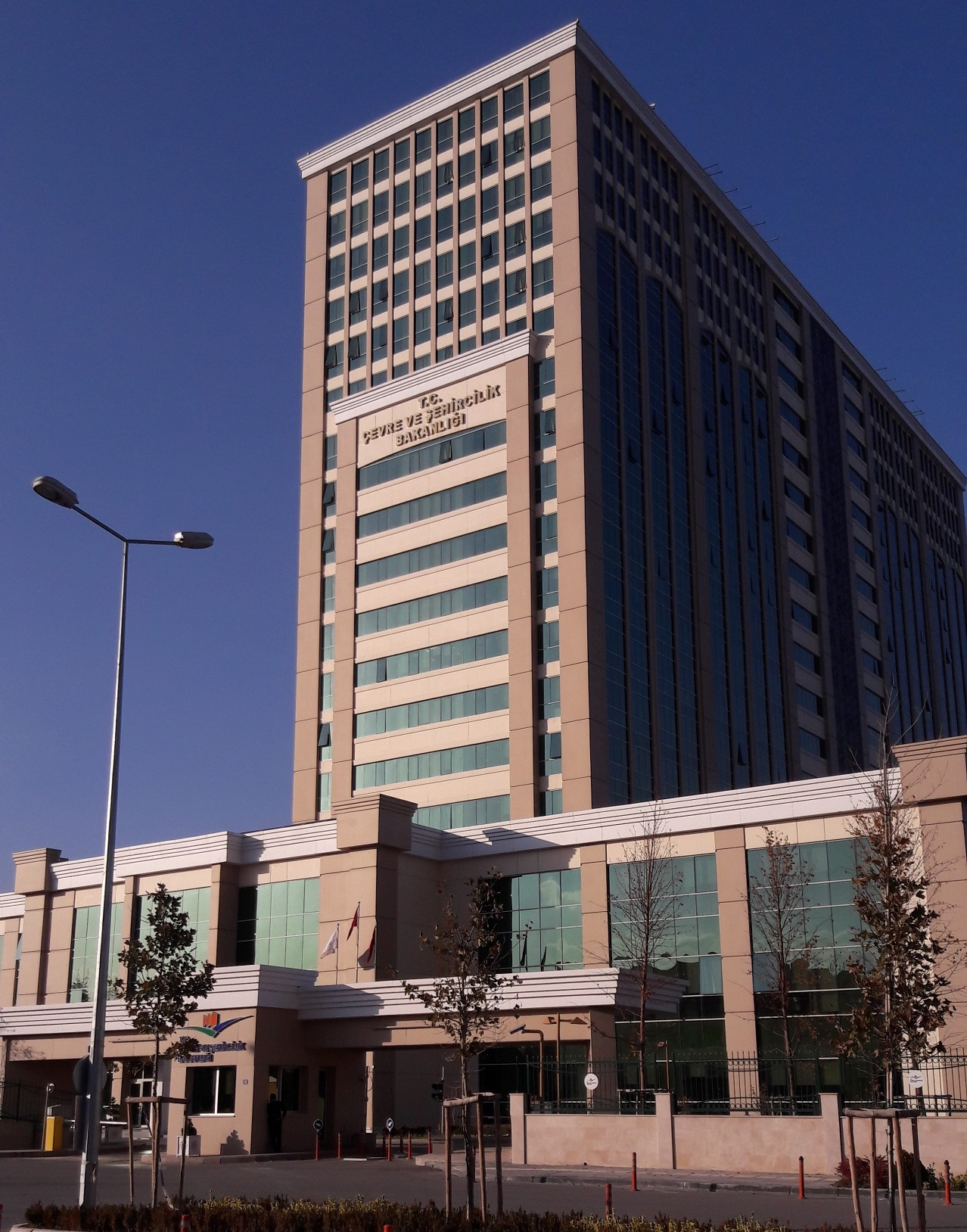
- Headquarters of the Ministry of Environment, Urbanisation and Climate Change in Ankara, Turkey.

Agency overview
- Formed: 29 June 2011
- Preceding agencies: Ministry of Public Works (1920–1983); Ministry of Development and Housing (1958–1983); Ministry of Public Works and Housing (1983–2011)
- Type: Environmental
- Headquarters: Ankara
- Minister responsible: Murat Kurum
- Deputy Ministers responsible: Refik Tuzcuoğlu; Fatma Varank; Hasan Suver; Vedad Gürgen
- Website: csb.gov.tr

The Ministry of Environment, Urbanisation and Climate Change (Turkish: Çevre, Şehircilik ve İklim Değişikliği Bakanlığı) is a government ministry of the Republic of Turkey, responsible for the environment, public works, and urban planning in Turkey. The ministry is headed by Murat Kurum.

== History ==
The Ministry was formed in 1983 through the merger of the Ministry of Public Works (Turkish: Bayındırlık Bakanlığı, formed 3 May 1920) and the Ministry of Development and Housing (Turkish: İmar ve İskan Bakanlığı, formed 1958). The result was the Ministry of Public Works and Housing (Turkish: Bayındırlık ve İskan Bakanlığı), which was renamed to the Ministry of Environment and Urbanisation in 2011. In 2021 climate change was added to the name.

== Responsibilities ==
A publication in the Official Gazette of the Republic of Turkey on 3 April 2012 reduced the fire safety inspection rights of municipal fire brigades, transferring all matters requiring interpretation or clarification to the Turkish Ministry of Environment.

The ministry is responsible for combating environmental issues in Turkey. A National Environment Agency was established in 2020 but by 2022 had not become operational.

According to the ministry the 2018 building standards amnesty raised 24 billion lira (4.2 billion USD), however as of 2023 it is not yet known what proportion of the buildings that collapsed in the 2023 quake had benefitted from building standards amnesties. After the 2023 earthquake President Erdoğan decreed that the ministry would be the only decision maker for new housing projects in earthquake-hit areas.

== Directorates ==
=== Directorate of Climate Change (Climate Change Presidency) ===
Formed in 2021 the Directorate of Climate Change (also known as the Climate Change Presidency) is responsible for climate change in Turkey. Despite the Energy Ministry being represented on the then "Climate Change and Air Management Coordination Board" (which seems to have been disbanded), in 2018 the European Commission criticised the lack of co-ordination between the climate change policy and energy policy of Turkey. According to Hayrettin Kurt the Climate Change Presidency will coordinate other parts of government annual planning and reporting of climate change mitigation and adaptation. However their website just says they will present plans to the "Coordination Board".

As of 2025 the chief climate change negotiator is Fatma Varank, a Deputy Minister of Environment, who has a background in housing.

== See also ==
- Air pollution in Turkey
- İlbank
