= Binali Yıldırım =

Prime Minister of Turkey from 2016 to 2018

- Yıldırım in 2016

28th Speaker of the Grand National Assembly
- In office 12 July 2018 – 18 February 2019
- President: Recep Tayyip Erdoğan
- Deputy: Mustafa Şentop; Levent Gök; Mithat Sancar; Celal Adan
- Preceded by: İsmail Kahraman
- Succeeded by: Mustafa Şentop

27th Prime Minister of Turkey
- In office 24 May 2016 – 9 July 2018
- President: Recep Tayyip Erdoğan
- Deputy: 2016–2017: Nurettin Canikli Mehmet Şimşek Numan Kurtulmuş Tuğrul Türkeş Veysi Kaynak; 2017–2018: Bekir Bozdağ Recep Akdağ Mehmet Şimşek Hakan Çavuşoğlu Fikri Işık
- Preceded by: Ahmet Davutoğlu
- Succeeded by: Office abolished

Parliamentary leader of the Justice and Development Party
- In office 24 May 2017 – 7 July 2018
- Deputy: Mustafa Elitaş; Naci Bostancı; İlknur İnceöz; Bülent Turan; Mehmet Muş
- Leader: Recep Tayyip Erdoğan
- Preceded by: Doğan Kubat
- Succeeded by: Naci Bostancı

Leader of the Justice and Development Party
- In office 22 May 2016 – 21 May 2017
- Preceded by: Ahmet Davutoğlu
- Succeeded by: Recep Tayyip Erdoğan

Minister of Transport, Maritime and Communication
- In office 24 November 2015 – 24 May 2016
- Prime Minister: Ahmet Davutoğlu
- Deputy: Yüksel Coşkunyürek
- Preceded by: Feridun Bilgin
- Succeeded by: Ahmet Arslan
- In office 1 November 2011 – 25 December 2013
- Prime Minister: Recep Tayyip Erdoğan
- Deputy: Yahya Baş
- Preceded by: Office established
- Succeeded by: Lütfi Elvan

Minister of Transport
- In office 6 July 2011 – 1 November 2011
- Prime Minister: Recep Tayyip Erdoğan
- Preceded by: Habip Soluk
- Succeeded by: Office abolished
- In office 29 August 2007 – 8 March 2011
- Prime Minister: Recep Tayyip Erdoğan
- Preceded by: İsmet Yılmaz
- Succeeded by: Habip Soluk
- In office 18 November 2002 – 8 May 2007
- Prime Minister: Abdullah Gül; Recep Tayyip Erdoğan
- Preceded by: Naci Kınacıoğlu
- Succeeded by: İsmet Yılmaz

Member of the Grand National Assembly
- In office 1 November 2015 – 14 May 2023
- Constituency: İzmir-I (Nov 2015, 2018)
- In office 3 November 2002 – 7 June 2015
- Constituency: Istanbul-I (2002); Erzincan (2007); İzmir-II (2011)

Personal details
- Born: 20 December 1955 (age 70) Kayıköy, Refahiye, Erzincan Province, Turkey
- Party: Justice and Development Party
- Spouse: Semiha Yıldırım (m. 1975)
- Children: 3
- Education: Istanbul Technical University; Malmö World Maritime University
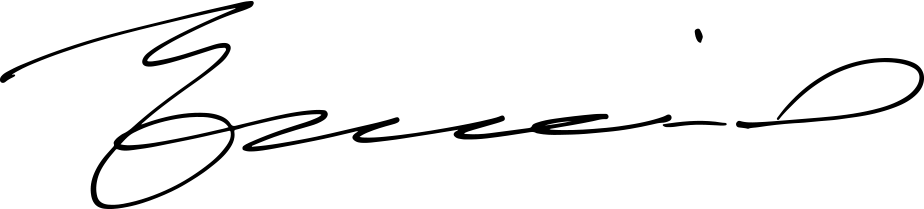
- Signature
- Website: Official website

Binali Yıldırım (Note: Turkish pronunciation: [binaːli ˈjɯɫdɯɾɯm]) (born 20 December 1955) is a Turkish politician who served as the 27th and last prime minister of Turkey from 2016 to 2018 and Speaker of the Grand National Assembly from 2018 to 2019. He was leader of the Justice and Development Party (AKP) from 2016 to 2017, then becoming parliamentary leader until 2018.

Yıldırım served as chairman of the board of Directors of Istanbul Fast Ferries Company (İDO) from 1994 to 2000 before being elected as an AKP member of Parliament for Istanbul's first electoral district during the 2002 general election. He was appointed as Minister of Transport by Prime Minister Abdullah Gül and continued in office after Erdoğan became prime minister in 2003. As Transport Minister, he presided over numerous projects such as Marmaray, high-speed rail lines and an expansion in the country's airport and road facilities, though received heavy criticism and calls for his resignation following the Pamukova train derailment in 2004. In 2011, the portfolios of Maritime and Communications were merged with the Ministry of Transport, with Yıldırım becoming the Minister of Transport, Maritime and Communication.

Leaving office in a cabinet reshuffle in 2013, Yıldırım ran as the AKP candidate for Mayor of İzmir in the 2014 local elections but lost to the incumbent Republican People's Party (CHP) candidate Aziz Kocaoğlu. He was appointed as special advisor to Erdoğan in June 2014 and left Parliament in the June 2015 general election due to the AKP's three-term rule for its sitting MPs. He was re-appointed as Transport Minister by Prime Minister Ahmet Davutoğlu after being reelected to Parliament in the November 2015 general election. Following Davutoğlu's resignation as party leader due to a breakdown in relations with President Erdoğan on 5 May 2016, Yıldırım was officially announced as the AKP's next leader by the Central Executive Committee on 19 May and was elected unopposed during the party's 2nd Extraordinary Congress on 22 May 2016. He formed the country's 65th government and became prime minister on 24 May 2016. Factions of the Turkish Army in discontent with his policies attempted to oust him in a failed military coup d'état attempt on 15 July 2016.

As a staunch supporter of Erdoğan, Yıldırım was referred to as a 'low-profile' Prime Minister and expected to spearhead a transition from a parliamentary system of government to an executive presidency, which would delegate greater powers to Erdoğan and the presidency. Following the declared victory of the 'Yes' vote in the 2017 constitutional referendum despite electoral irregularities, Yıldırım resigned as AKP Leader in place of Erdoğan, who was elected as his successor during the 3rd AKP extraordinary Congress on 21 May 2017. Yıldırım was subsequently elected as the AKP's parliamentary leader by 300 votes on 24 May. The office of Prime Minister of Turkey was abolished as a result of the 2017 constitutional referendum.

In 2013, Yıldırım was implicated in a government corruption scandal, with the financial and social activities of his family members also coming under scrutiny. He has caused controversy over his defence of greater government surveillance and comments favouring sex segregation. He was the AKP nominee for Mayor of Istanbul in both the March 2019 and June 2019 Istanbul mayoral elections (the latter of which occurred after the Supreme Election Council annulled the March election), losing both to CHP nominee Ekrem İmamoğlu, to whom he conceded defeat and congratulated following the June 2019 election.

== Early life and career ==
Binali Yıldırım was born in Refahiye, Erzincan Province, on 20 December 1955. His name, Binali, means son of Ali in Arabic (بن علي). An Alevi neighbour of his family gave him the name. His surname, Yıldırım, means "lightning bolt" and has often been attributed by the pro-government press to embody the rapid growth of transport infrastructure during his tenure as Minister of Transport.

Binali Yıldırım's origins have been frequently questioned due to contradictory claims by himself, his family, and other people. At a political rally in Hakkari and Van, while asking Kurds to vote for his party, he mentioned that his origins are Kurdish; however, his cousin stated that their family is not Kurdish. Many see Binali Yıldırım's claim of having Kurdish ancestry as an attempt to gain the support of Kurdish voters. Yıldırım also claimed that he is from Şanlıurfa while addressing citizens from Şanlıurfa, although it is known that he is from Erzincan. As a result, many authors started theorizing about his origins. Macit Gürbüz, a Turkish author, claims that his family migrated to Urfa from Raqqa and then to Ağrı. Afterwards, the family ended up in a village in Gümüşhane and lastly in Erzincan. Likewise, some people from Ağrı assume Binali Yıldırım as a fellow Kurd from Ağrı, while people from Erzincan claim him to be a Turk.

=== Education ===
Yıldırım was educated at the Istanbul Technical University's School of Naval Architecture and Ocean Engineering, studying Naval Architecture and Marine Engineering and later received his master's degree from the same department. While serving in numerous managerial positions in the General Directorate of the Turkish Shipping Industry and the Camialtı Shipyard, he received specialised training regarding Maritime Safety and Environmental Protection from the International Maritime Organisation's World Maritime University in Sweden. While at the World Maritime University, he spent six months working with maritime administration professionals at Scandinavian and European ports.

=== Istanbul Fast Ferries Director, 1994–2000 ===
After graduation, Yıldırım served as the director general of the Istanbul Fast Ferries Company (İDO) from 1994 to 2000 while Recep Tayyip Erdoğan was Mayor of Istanbul. In attempts to make greater use of sea travel to ease transport congestion in Istanbul, Yıldırım established the Istanbul-Yalova and Istanbul-Bandırma ferry routes and oversaw the establishment of 29 ferry terminals, the commission of 22 passenger and 4 car ferries, making İDO the largest commercial maritime transportation company of its time. In 1999, he was awarded a quality medal by the Skål International group for his contributions to the modernisation of the maritime transportation and tourism industries. He was removed from office by Erdoğan's successor, Mayor Ali Müfit Gürtuna, following allegations of misconduct, having been accused of hiring out buffets to a firm run by members of his close family.

=== Early political career ===
As the Director of İDO, Yıldırım established a close relationship to Recep Tayyip Erdoğan, who served as Istanbul's Mayor from 1994 to 1998. When the latter led efforts to establish a new moderate conservative democratic political party in August 2001, Yıldırım joined Erdoğan to become a founding member of the Justice and Development Party (AKP). He was subsequently fielded as a parliamentary candidate for Istanbul's first electoral district in the 2002 general election and was elected following the party's landslide victory.

== Member of Parliament ==
Elected as a Member of Parliament for Istanbul's first electoral district in the 2002 general election, he was re-elected as an MP in the 2007 general election as a candidate from his home province of Erzincan. In 2006, he stated that his name was of Alevi origin and that he would work hard for the AKP to field Alevi candidates in the upcoming election, in response to criticism that the party was discriminating against the Alevi minority in Turkey due to its Sunni Islam political origin.

In the 2011 general election, Yıldırım was elected for a third consecutive time from İzmir's second electoral district. Due to the AKP's three-term limit on its MPs, Yıldırım was unable to seek re-election for a fourth time in the June 2015 general election. However, he re-entered Parliament from İzmir's first electoral district during the November 2015 snap general election seven months later.

On February 18, 2019, the speaker of the Turkish Parliament Binali Yildirim announced that he would resign due to the fact that he would run for mayor of Istanbul in the local elections to be held in Turkey on March 31, 2019.

== Minister of Transport, Maritime, and Communication ==
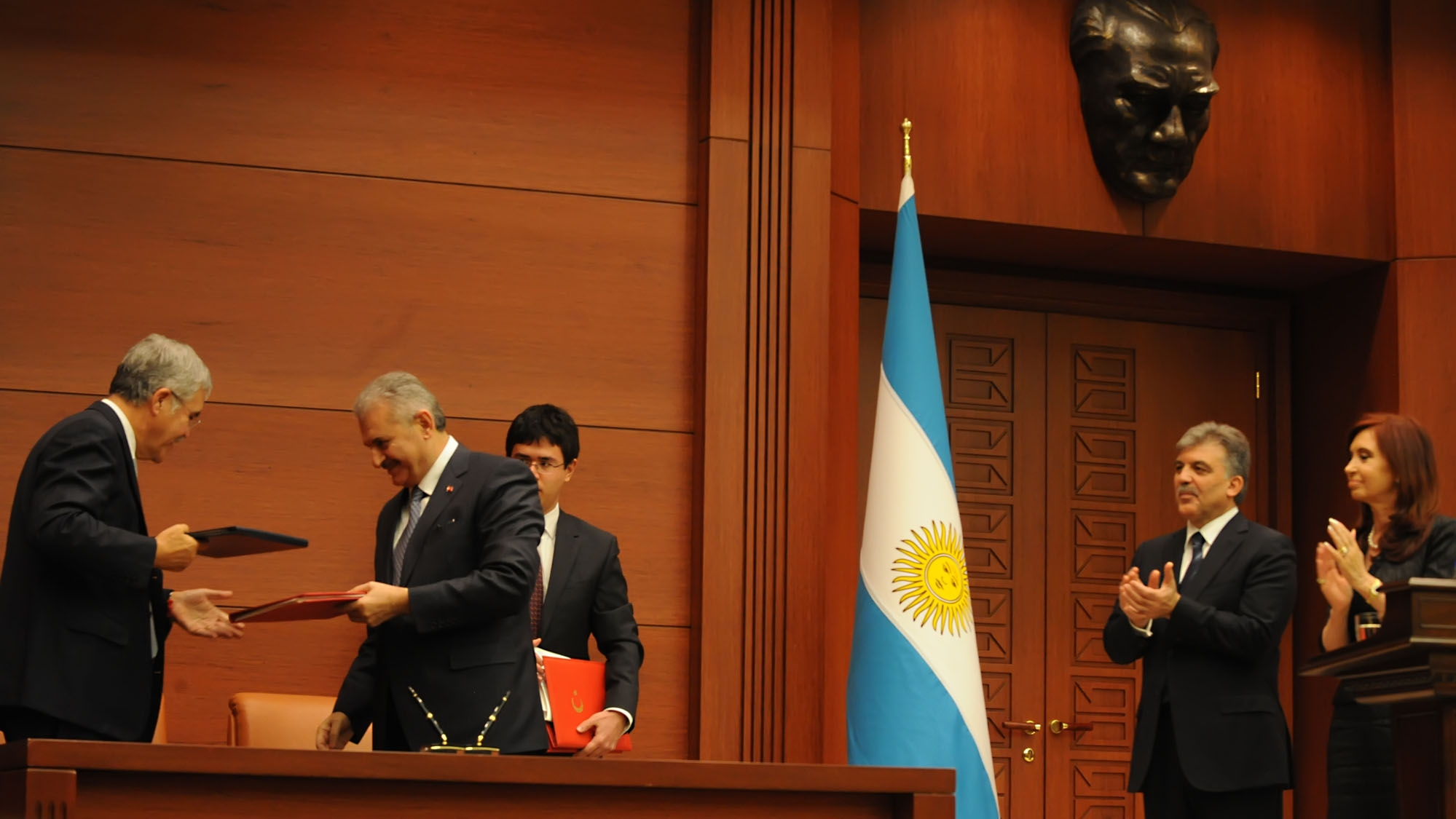
Yıldırım signing an agreement with his Argentine counterpart in 2011

Binali Yıldırım has been referred to as the AKP's 'unchanging Transport Minister' due to his almost uninterrupted 11-year term in office. The only other non-independent AKP politician to hold the post before Yıldırım became prime minister was Lütfi Elvan, who succeeded Yıldırım in 2013 and served until 2015.

Yıldırım served as the Minister of Transport between November 2002 and November 2011, leaving office three months before the 2007 general election and the 2011 general election in accordance to Article 114 of the Turkish constitution, which requires the vacation of the partisan Minister of Transport and his or her replacement by an independent minister three months before the end of a parliamentary term. In November 2011, the portfolios of maritime and communications were merged with the Transport Ministry, with Yıldırım becoming the first Minister of Transport, Maritime and Communication. He left office during a cabinet reshuffle in 2013, but was reinstated as minister by Prime Minister Ahmet Davutoğlu on 24 November 2015.

On his personal website, Yıldırım has claimed that 17,500 kilometers of new motorways, 29 new airports and 1,213 kilometers of high-speed railway were constructed during his term as minister.

=== Rail network expansion ===
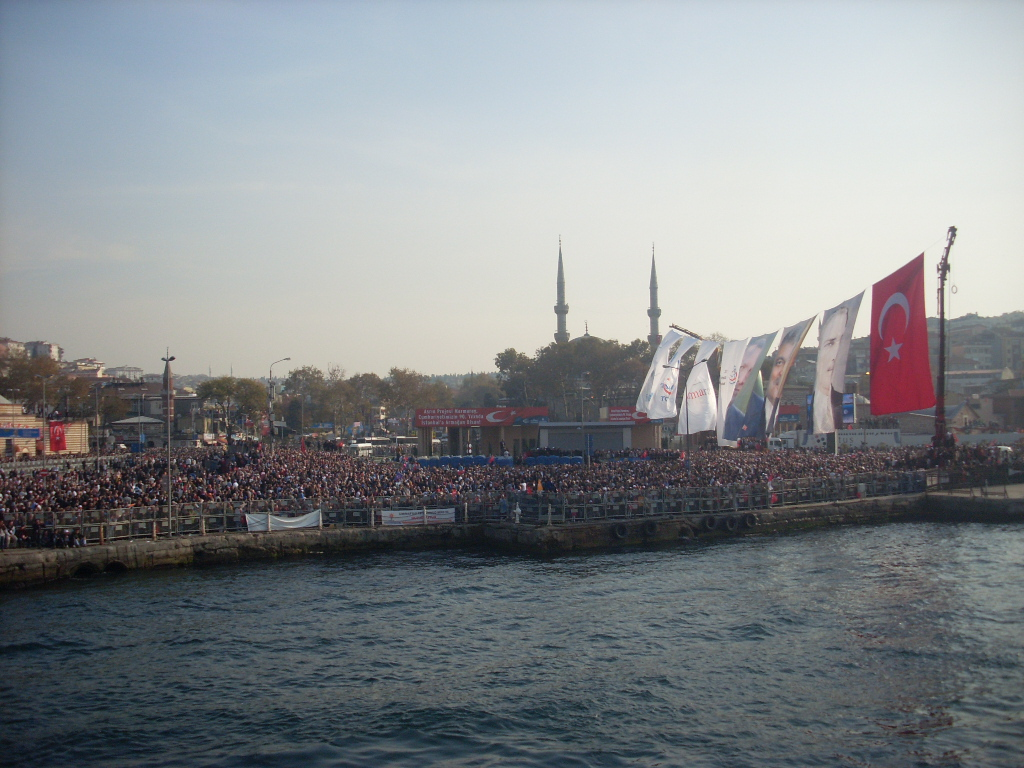
Opening ceremony of Marmaray, the world's first intercontinental subway, October 2013

In 2003, the government launched Turkey's first high-speed rail project, the Hızlandırılmış tren ("Fast train"). On 4 January 2004, Yıldırım oversaw the launch of construction works on the first branch between Ankara and Eskişehir, that was eventually inaugurated in 2009 with total costs of ₺7.5 million to upgrade the tracks, rolling stock and increase the speed of trains on the route to 150 km/h (93 mph). At the same time, work was completed to increase the average train speeds to 100 km/h (62 mph) throughout Turkey. In 2014, the line, operated by a subsidiary of the Turkish State Railways (TCDD), was extended to Istanbul, completing the Ankara–Istanbul high-speed railway. Construction on the Ankara–Konya high-speed railway began in 2006 and was completed in 2011.

Under the strategic aims published by the Transport Ministry while Yıldırım was in office, the government planned over 10,000 kilometres (6,200 mi) of high speed lines by the year 2023, as part of the AKP's '2023 vision' for the centenary of the Turkish Republic. The 'fast train' services were however met with criticism that the government had refused to listen to scientific concerns, with the project coming under heavy fire following the 2004 Pamukova train derailment despite Yıldırım's insistence that it would not be scrapped.

In addition to national rail infrastructure, several suburban and inner-city rail and metro systems were inaugurated by Yıldırım. These included the Istanbul Kabataş–Taksim funicular in 2006, both the İzmir commuter rail (İZBAN) and the Adana Metro in May 2010, the Istanbul Metro lines M3 in 2013, M4 in 2012 and M6 in 2015 and the Ankara Metro lines M3 and M4 in 2014. In 2013, the first phase of the Marmaray project, which links the continents of Europe and Asia via a tunnel under the Bosphorus in Istanbul was opened, due to link and take over the entirety of the Istanbul suburban rail services by 2018. Yıldırım also presided over extensions to the İzmir Metro and Istanbul Metro line M2, which was extended from Şişhane to Yenikapı via the Golden Horn Metro Bridge in 2014.

=== Aviation expansion ===
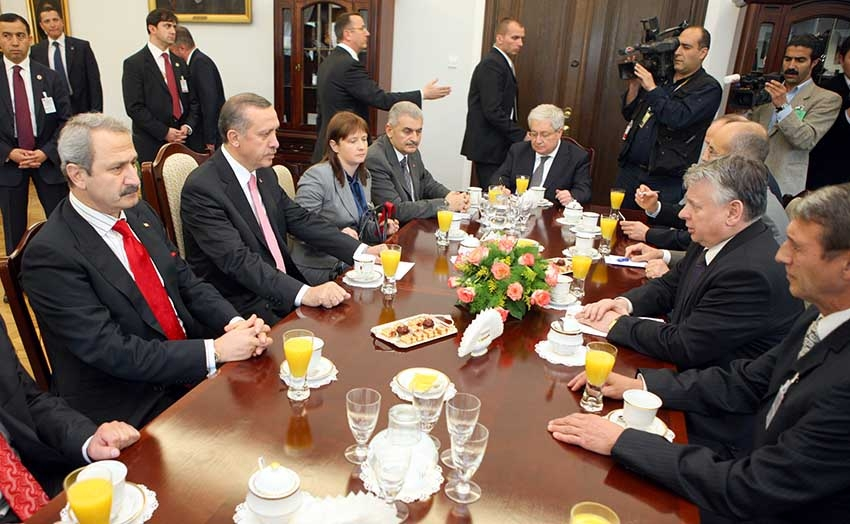
Yıldırım accompanying Recep Tayyip Erdoğan on a visit to the Polish Senate in 2009

Yıldırım presided over a new Transport Ministry initiative to vastly upgrade airports that were regarded to be in 'discarded condition'. Under the new scheme, numerous airports were closed for refurbishment. Following improvement work, the Tokat, Kahramanmaraş, Sivas, Gaziantep and Çanakkale airports were re-opened in 2006 while Balıkesir Airport and Kars Harakani Airport was reopened by Yıldırım in 2007. A new international terminal at İzmir Adnan Menderes Airport was opened in 2006, with Yıldırım also present at the opening of a new domestic terminal in 2014. New terminal buildings for Erzincan Airport and Mardin Airport were both opened in 2011 and a new international terminal for Milas–Bodrum Airport was completed in 2012. Major improvements to Balıkesir Koca Seyit Airport and Kastamonu Airport were completed in 2010 and 2013 respectively.

Numerous new airports were constructed or completed construction while Yıldırım was minister. Along with Zonguldak Airport and Şanlıurfa GAP Airport, Yıldırım opened the controversial Hatay Airport in 2007. Amasya Merzifon Airport followed in 2008, while Gazipaşa Airport serving Antalya and Gökçeada Airport serving Çanakkale were opened in 2010. Zafer Airport serving the cities of Afyonkarahisar, Uşak and Kütahya in 2012, Iğdır Airport also in 2012 and Şırnak Airport followed in 2013. Erhaç Airport in Malatya and Cengiz Topel Airport in Kocaeli, previously operating as military air bases, were opened to civilian air traffic in 2007 and 2011 respectively. Yıldırım was also involved in the construction of the Ordu-Giresun Airport, the third in the world to be built on an artificial island and the only one in Turkey and Europe, eventually opened on 22 May 2015. He was also involved in the initial phases of the Istanbul Airport project to be opened in 2018, which is due to become the largest in the world.

=== Maritime projects ===
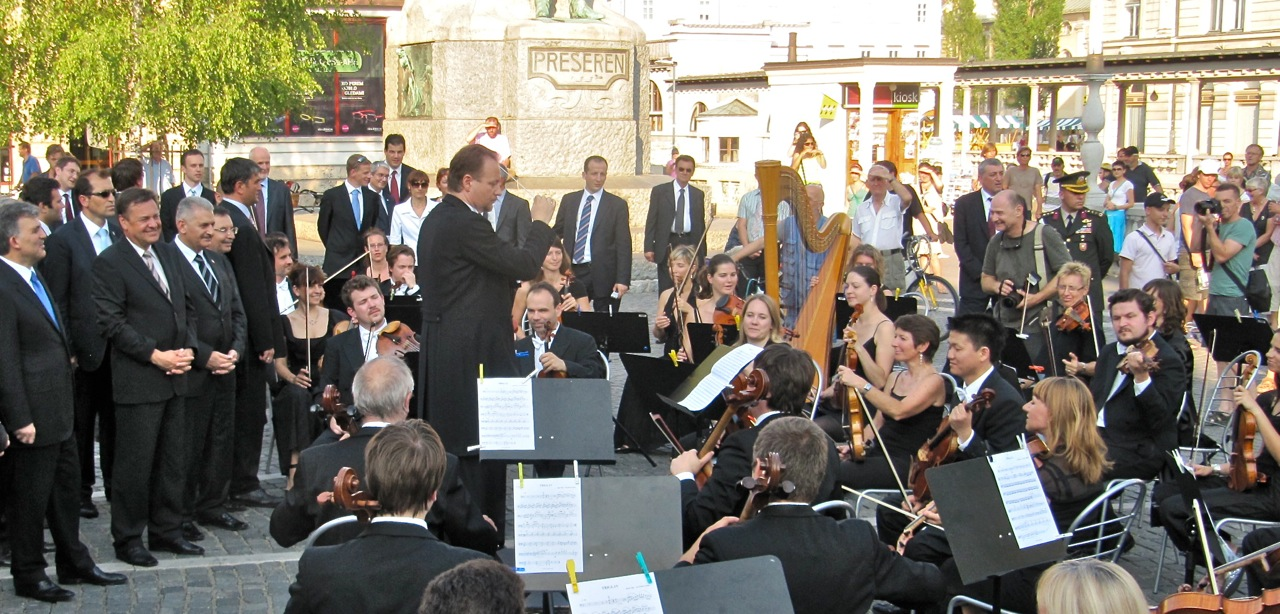
Yıldırım accompanying President Abdullah Gül on a visit to Ljubljana, Slovenia in 2010

One of the most prevalent projects commissioned by the AKP government was the establishment of a new artificial waterway, running parallel to the Bosphorus and linking the Black Sea to the Aegean Sea. The project, named Kanal Istanbul was described by former prime minister Recep Tayyip Erdoğan as the party's 'crazy project', being one of the most prominent goals for the party's 2023 vision.

The government initially started discreet studies into the project's viability and possible routes, with Yıldırım announcing plans in 2009. The project was officially inaugurated by Recep Tayyip Erdoğan in 2011. By 2016, Yıldırım announced that five possible routes for the project had been identified. However, he denied that the final route had been confirmed and warned investors to not engage in speculative asset purchases.

In addition to Kanal Istanbul, Yıldırım also presided over various upgrades to the country's existing waterways and ferry services. İzmir obtained new car and passenger ferries in 2013 and 2014, while a new ferry terminal was opened at Tuzla for İDO ferry services to Yalova. Yıldırım also presided over privatisation of the state commercial ferry services, with the newspaper Yeni Şafak, although currently pro-government, alleging that Yıldırım had given unlawful concessions to TAV Airports Holding in 2012 when the Holding was purchasing İDO from the state. In 2015, Yıldırım announced plans to introduce positive discrimination for women mariners.

=== Government surveillance and censorship ===
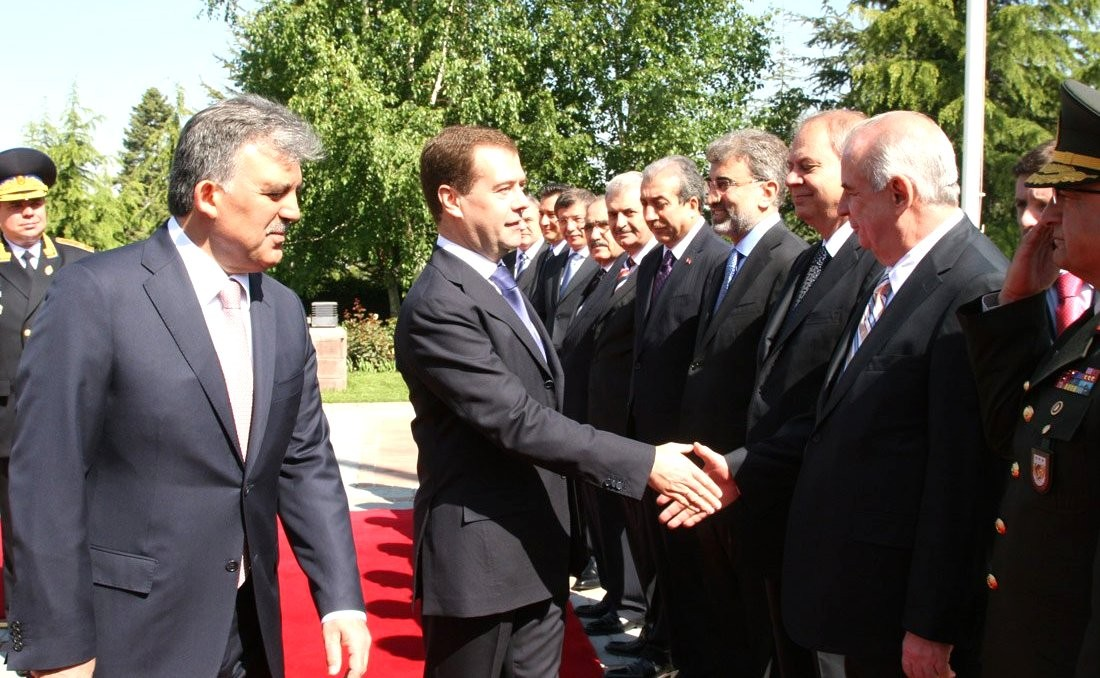
Yıldırım along with other cabinet ministers during a state visit by Russian president Dmitry Medvedev to Turkey in 2010

In 2011, the portfolio of communications was officially added to Yıldırım's brief. As the Minister responsible for Transport, Maritime and Communication, Yıldırım oversaw significant government censorship of the Internet and greater government surveillance. In response to criticism of growing government surveillance, Yıldırım also caused controversy by responding 'If you are not up to anything illegal, don't worry about surveillance'.

In 2008, growing internet censorship resulted in blocks being implemented on YouTube and Blogger and approximately 1,000 other sites. A report commissioned by the British organisation Cyber-Rights.Org stated that 'the current Turkish law on controlling Internet content, through its procedural and substantive deficiencies, is designed to censor and silence political speech.' In response to criticism over Law 5651, which made it easier for the government to block websites, Yıldırım claimed that sites would continue to be blocked 'as they post content inappropriate for Turkish families'. In 2010, close to 44 IP addresses used by YouTube and Google were blocked, with the total number of blocked websites being estimated to be at 8,000. In July 2010, Turkey's first ever protest against internet censorship took place, with over 2,000 people demonstrating at Taksim Square in Istanbul chanting slogans against Yıldırım. Although Yıldırım technically left office on 25 December 2013, he led efforts to generating court orders to block Twitter and YouTube due to a large-scale online anti-government backlash following revelations of government corruption in 2013.

== Controversies ==
=== 2004 Pamukova train derailment ===
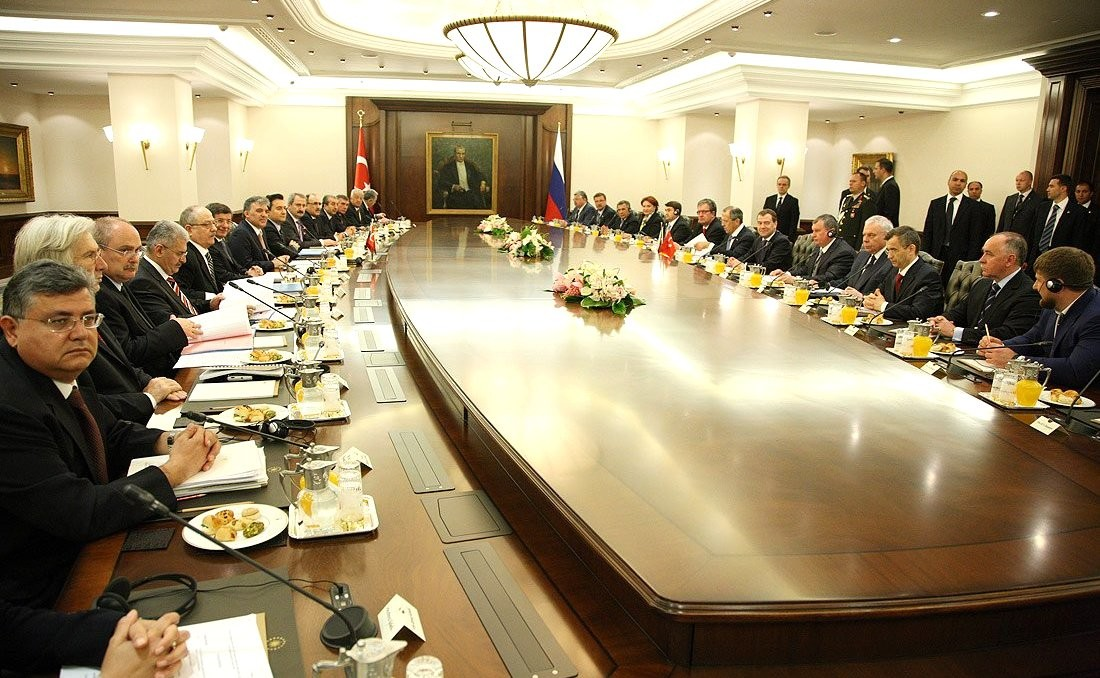
Yıldırım at a meeting between the cabinets of Russia and Turkey, 2010

On 22 July 2004, a fast train en route from Ankara to Istanbul derailed after entering a curve too fast while passing through Pamukova, Sakarya Province. The train was one of the new 'fast trains' that ran on upgraded track and with new rolling stock brought in by Yıldırım and the AKP government as part of their 'faster trains' program. 41 people were killed while 80 were injured in the accident.

Yıldırım, as the Minister responsible for the 'faster trains' program, faced heavy criticism and calls for his resignation following the incident, with trade unions and non-governmental organisations blaming Yıldırım's dismissal of concerns raised by scientific experts about the safety of the new trains. It emerged that the Turkish State Railways (TCDD), which runs Turkey's train network, dismissed a call from scientists for the fast trains to be suspended during a meeting before the accident, where TCDD officials were allegedly warned that 'a future derailment would not come as a surprise'. Despite calls for his resignation, Yıldırım refused to resign and claimed that he was not a politician that would run away from crises, adding that the faster train program would continue. Trade Unions subsequently blamed the AKP of covering up the governmental mismanagement that caused the incident and blaming the workers who constructed the track instead.

Following the accident, it was uncovered that numerous senior officials from the TCDD had close relations to Yıldırım. The General Director of the TCDD at the time, Süleyman Karaman, was said to have hailed from the same village as Yıldırım's family, while Yıldırım was also said to have been directly related to another TCDD executive board member, Şükrü Kutlu. Another board member, Talat Aydın, was also alleged to be close to Yıldırım and concurrently served as a High Supervisory Board member at the Office of the Prime Minister.

=== Accusations of sex segregation ===
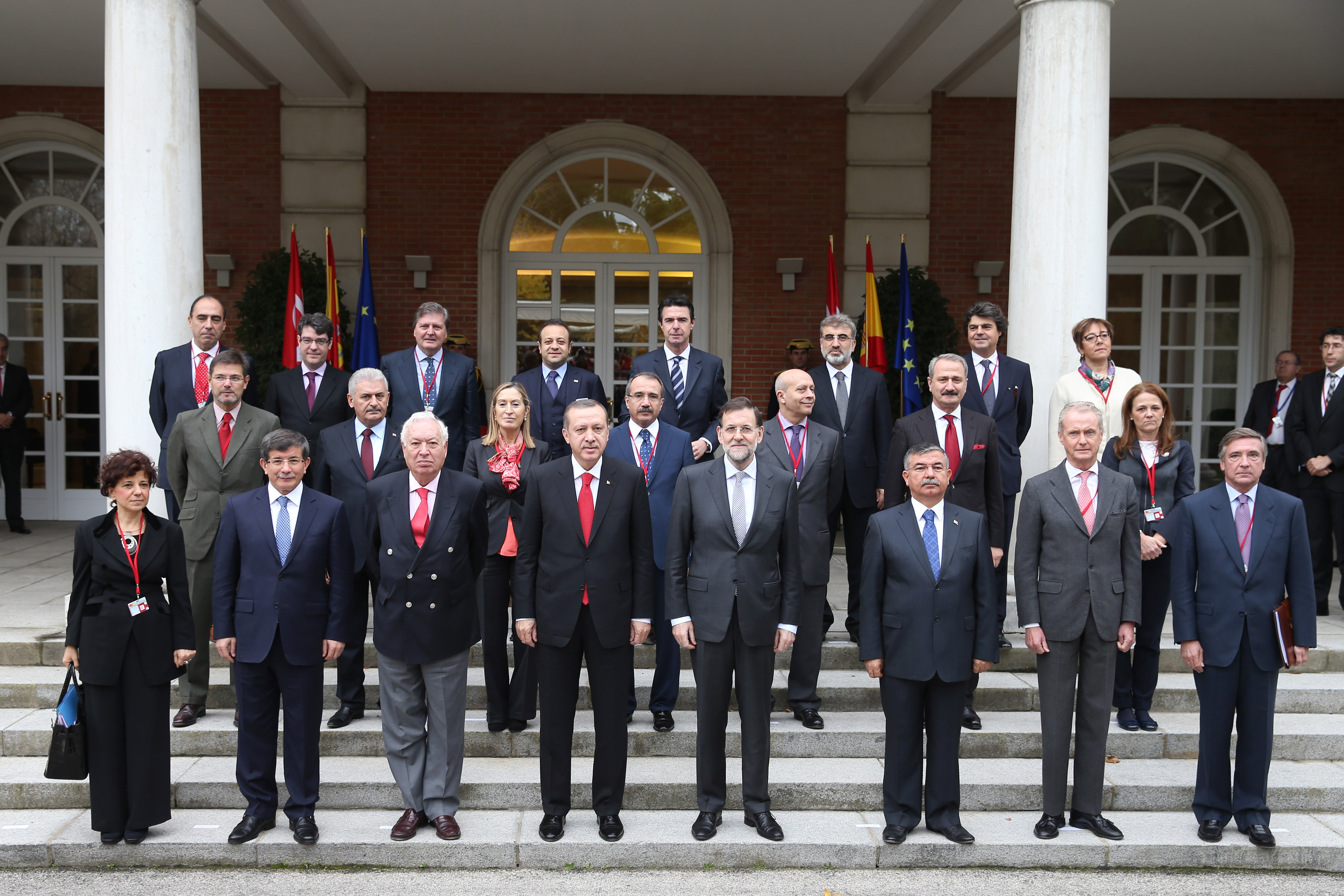
Yıldırım (middle, 2nd left) following a joint meeting of the Spanish and Turkish cabinets at Madrid, Spain, in 2012

A photograph of Yıldırım's veiled wife, Semiha Yıldırım, eating alone and sitting separately from him during a business lunch went viral and produced an outcry in Turkey in 2005, many criticising him with charges of sexism. The opposition Republican People's Party (CHP) claimed that it was an attempt by the Islamist-orientated AKP to construct a new social order, while numerous other non-governmental associations, universities and newspapers accused the Minister of supporting sex segregation. A statement released by Yıldırım following the outcry claimed that Semiha Yıldırım had sat alone at her own will.

While attending the annual ball of his alma mater Istanbul Technical University (İTU) in 2013, Yıldırım explained that he had made his university choices with difficulty but claimed that he did not apply for Boğaziçi University because he saw 'young men and women sitting together in the university garden' and that this would result in him 'going down the wrong path'. The comments were met with derision by Boğaziçi students, who claimed that the comments were a product of 'authoritarian conservatism' and released a joint statement claiming that Yıldırım 'should not fret, since he has already gone down the wrong path'.

=== Personal and family finances ===
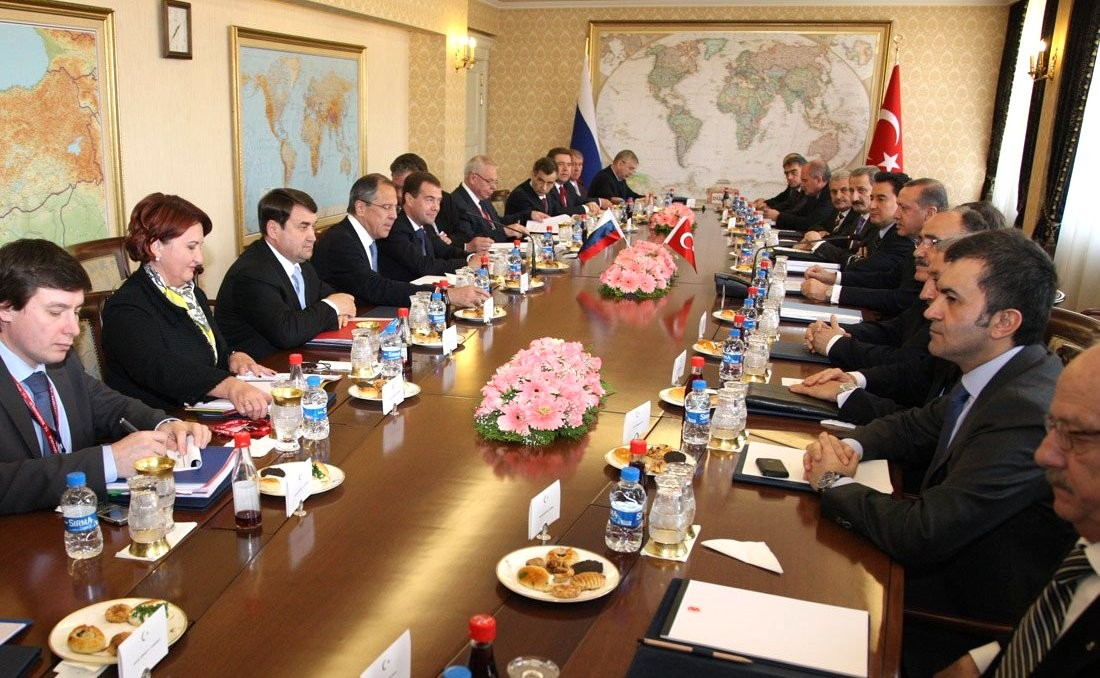
Yıldırım at a cabinet meeting during a state visit to Turkey by Russian President Dmitry Medvedev, 2010

Yıldırım's personal and family finances have continuously been criticised by the political opposition. In March 2014, Republican People's Party (CHP) deputy leader Sezgin Tanrıkulu brought forward allegations that Yıldırım's son owned 30 ships, with both Yıldırım and his son being partial owners of numerous shipping companies around the world, some of which were also owned by businessmen that had been accused of corruption alongside Yıldırım during the 2013 corruption scandal. Allegations regarding Yıldırım's son first emerged in 2003, when he allegedly obtained a loan from a shipping firm named Santour that had been leased a ferryboat by Yıldırım as Transport Minister. It was further alleged that the firm was being funded by the state despite being a private company. In response to the scandal, Yıldırım issued a statement claiming that he had no interest or involvement in the matter and that the institution responsible was the Privatisation Administration, not the Ministry of Transport.

Yıldırım has been identified by several investigative journalists to be the owner of 17 companies, 28 ships and 2 super-yachts, though the exact number of ships registered under his name remains unknown. Yıldırım's son and daughter established their shipping company in 2002, purchasing their first ship in 2003 for $445,000 to operate the İzmir Çeşme-Brindisi (Italy) route. In response to criticism over how the money was acquired, Yıldırım claimed that he had partially paid for the ship himself and caused further controversy when he claimed that '$445,000 is not a lot of money'. On 7 January 2014 following a police raid on the Port Administration in İzmir, Yıldırım's brother-in-law was arrested for conspiring to rig bids on tender, defalcation, giving and taking bribes, serious fraud and sharing confidential information regarding tenders with others. He was also filmed and caught on camera while taking bribes.

On 12 April 2016, Yıldırım's son was photographed by a Sözcü newspaper journalist playing roulette at the Marina Bay Sands Casino in Singapore. The photographs were leaked online, causing criticism due to Yıldırım's previous comments regarding religious morality and Islam, which conflicted with his son's gambling. It was alleged that the photographs were leaked by Prime Minister Ahmet Davutoğlu in an attempt to halt a challenge by Yıldırım for the party leadership. Soon after, photographs of Yıldırım's nephew, whom he had appointed to the Istanbul Regional Directorate of Transport, were leaked showing him drinking rakı, a traditional Turkish alcoholic beverage that also conflicted with the Islam-orientated social policy espoused by the AKP.

=== Veil controversy ===
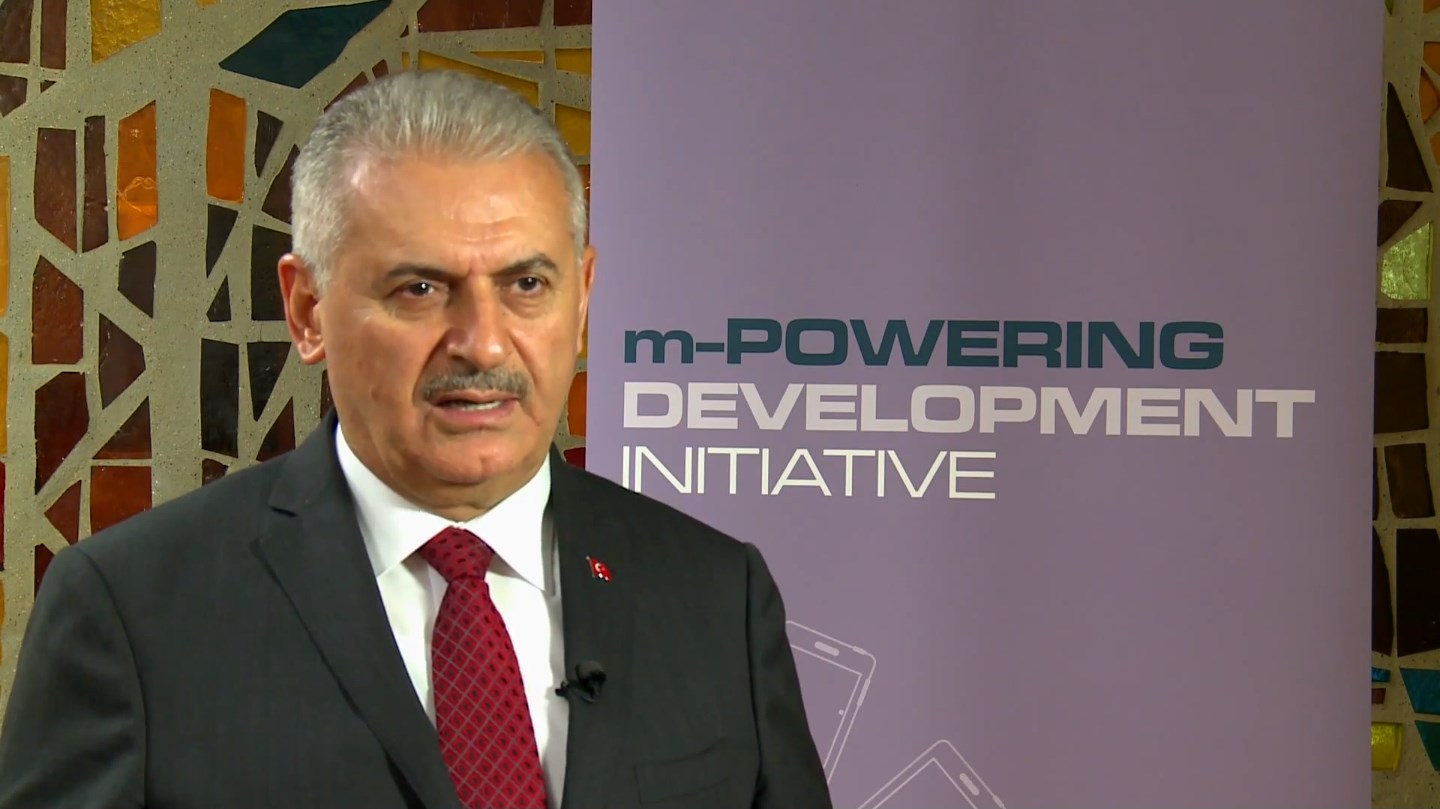
Yıldırım speaking at the International Telecommunication Union (ITU), 27 May 2014

In 2006, Yıldırım was subject to criticism by secularists in Turkey over allegations that he preferred veiled women or men with veiled wives when appointing bureaucrats to positions within the Ministry of Transport. The criticism spread to the AKP government as a whole and to Prime Minister Recep Tayyip Erdoğan after Durmuş Yılmaz, whose wife wore a headscarf, was appointed Governor of the Central Bank of Turkey. In response to the criticism, Yıldırım denied the claims of discrimination and stated that it was against the party's program, calling for a non-veiled candidate to come forward so that he could appoint her to 'any' bureaucratic position.

=== Claims regarding technology ===
Despite being the Minister responsible for communications, Yıldırım gave a speech at a Türk Telekom event in 2011 and was ridiculed for his apparent lack of knowledge about Cloud computing. In his speech, he claimed 'there's this thing called the cloud system. Everyone throws something into it and people take what they need. This is how I understand it, maybe it's something different.' He also claimed that users would 'lose their minds' if they tried to understand how it works. He added that one has to just use the cloud technology and try not understand it. A video of the speech re-emerged in 2016 shortly after he became prime minister, being contrasted to a speech given by Barack Obama promoting 'Take Your Child to the Lab' Week at the end of February 2016.

=== Allegations about his son ===
In May 2021, Sedat Peker, a Turkish mafia boss and whistle-blower, started to release YouTube videos that contained several allegations about Süleyman Soylu. As Süleyman Soylu did not resign, he started to target other people, including the son of Binali Yıldırım. In one of his videos, he claimed that Yıldırım's son Erkam Yıldırım, who is in the sea transport business with a large fleet, was involved in the cocaine traffic and has been to Caracas, Venezuela a few times to arrange the logistics.

Yildirim denied Peker's claims as "absolutely slander," stating that his son had travelled to Venezuela in December 2020 to distribute COVID-19 test kits and protective equipment to those in need. His son filed a criminal complaint against Peker, and in September 2021 prosecutors indicted Peker on charges of insult and slander over the allegations. As of 2025, the underlying allegations has not been the subject of any public resolution.

== Later political career ==
=== Special advisor to Erdoğan, 2014–15 ===
After leaving office as Transport Minister in 2013, he was appointed by the AKP as an advisor to the party leader, whom at that point was Recep Tayyip Erdoğan. When Erdoğan was elected as the president of Turkey during the 2014 presidential election, he became a special advisor to the president despite being seen as a potential prime minister. With Ahmet Davutoğlu becoming prime minister, Yıldırım continued as an 'unofficial' advisor to Erdoğan since officially being appointed to the Presidential Office required his resignation as an MP. Leaving Parliament in June 2015, he was officially appointed and continued as presidential advisor until being re-elected as an MP in the November 2015 general election. Yıldırım was frequently referred to by the press as Erdoğan's closest and most loyal supporters.

=== İzmir mayoral candidacy ===
Local election 2014: İzmir Metropolitan Mayor
Party	Candidate	Votes	%
CHP	Aziz Kocaoğlu ✓	1,307,501	49.6
AKP	Binali Yıldırım	947,108	35.9
MHP	Murat Taşer	210,124	8.0
HDP	Osman Özçelik	88,375	3.4
Others		82,760	3.1
Turnout		2,635,868	90.4

In the 2014 local elections, Yıldırım was approached by Erdoğan to run for the Metropolitan Mayor of İzmir, regarded as a stronghold of the opposition Republican People's Party (CHP). Campaigning with the slogan 'İzmir'e İyi bir Bakan Lazım', which could be translated both as 'İzmir needs a good Minister' or 'İzmir needs someone to look after it well', he set out 35 projects for İzmir, co-inciding with İzmir's license plate code, which is also 35. These included a tunnel and bridge linking the southern and northern banks of the Gulf of İzmir.

In 2013, a dubious poll showed that Yıldırım was ahead of the CHP in İzmir. Despite accusations of government electoral fraud and intentional power cuts designed to obstruct the counting process, Yıldırım lost the election and came second to the CHP candidate and incumbent Mayor Aziz Kocaoğlu, who won 49.6% of the vote compared to Yıldırım's 35.9%. Following the election, Yıldırım praised the AKP's local gains in İzmir where the party took 6 local mayoralties, stating that the local municipalities that had endorsed the AKP had said 'yes' to service and good governance. In 2016 following Ahmet Davutoğlu's resignation as prime minister, his mayoral rival and successful opponent Aziz Kocaoğlu stated that he preferred Yıldırım as Davutoğlu's successor due to his ties with İzmir.

=== Potential AKP leadership bids ===
Yıldırım was frequently observed as a potential contender for the Justice and Development Party leadership during Davutoğlu's premiership, especially at times when the relationship between Davutoğlu and Erdoğan appeared to be faltering. The most serious challenge from Yıldırım came during the AKP Ordinary Congress held in September 2015, where an apparent disagreement between Davutoğlu and Erdoğan over the central executive committee candidate lists caused Yıldırım to begin collecting delegate signatures for a potential leadership bid. Yıldırım stopped collecting signatures at the last minute when a deal between Davutoğlu and Erdoğan was reached.

== Prime Minister, 2016–2018 ==
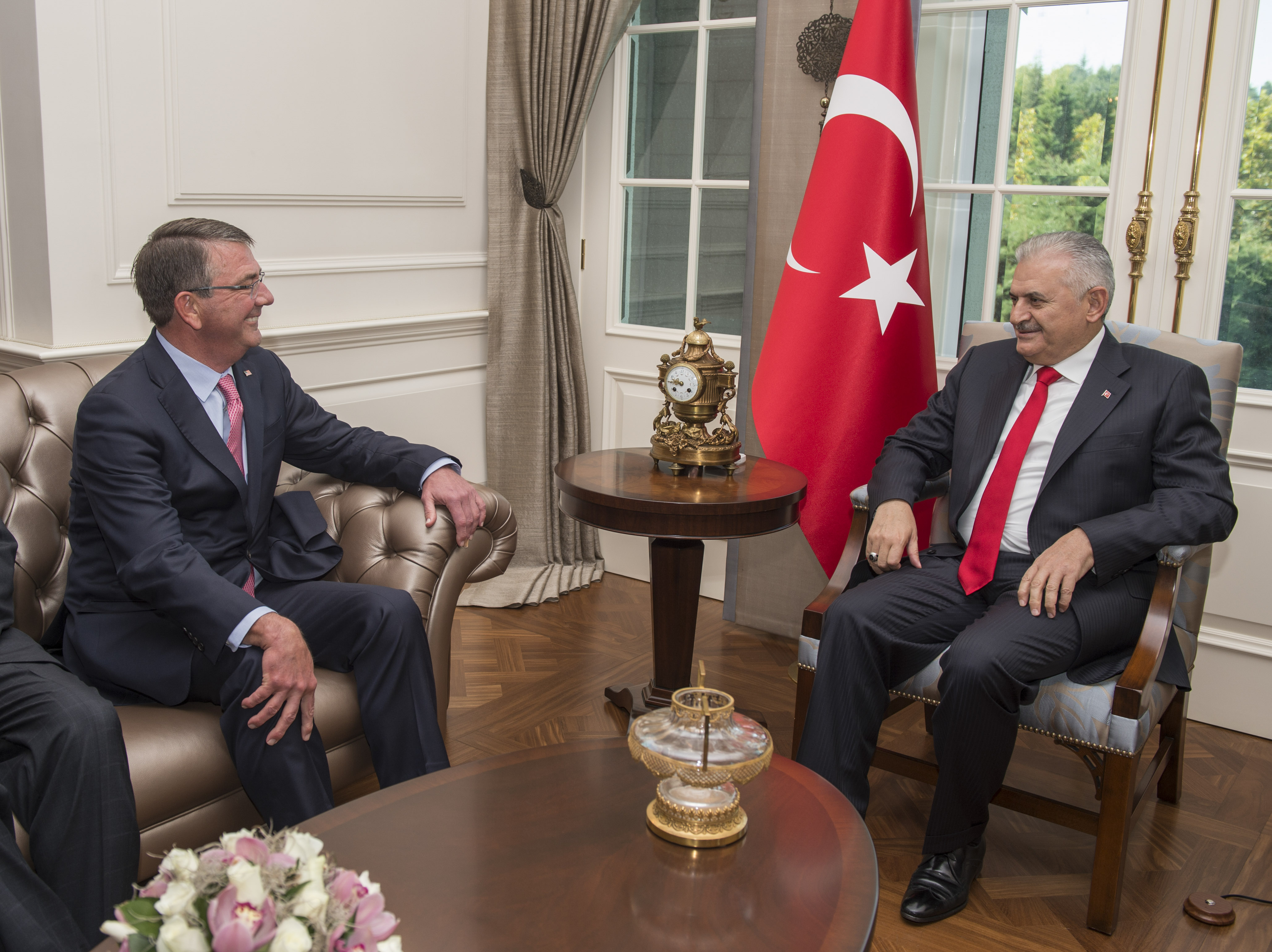
Yildirim meets U.S. Secretary of Defense Ash Carter in Ankara, 21 October 2016

Having been identified as one of Recep Tayyip Erdoğan's most loyal supporters, Yıldırım has been referred to as a 'low-profile' Prime Minister even by members of his own party, working only towards the goal of abolishing the parliamentary system of government and bringing about an executive presidency that would allow Erdoğan to consolidate his powers and effectively abolish the Office of the prime minister.

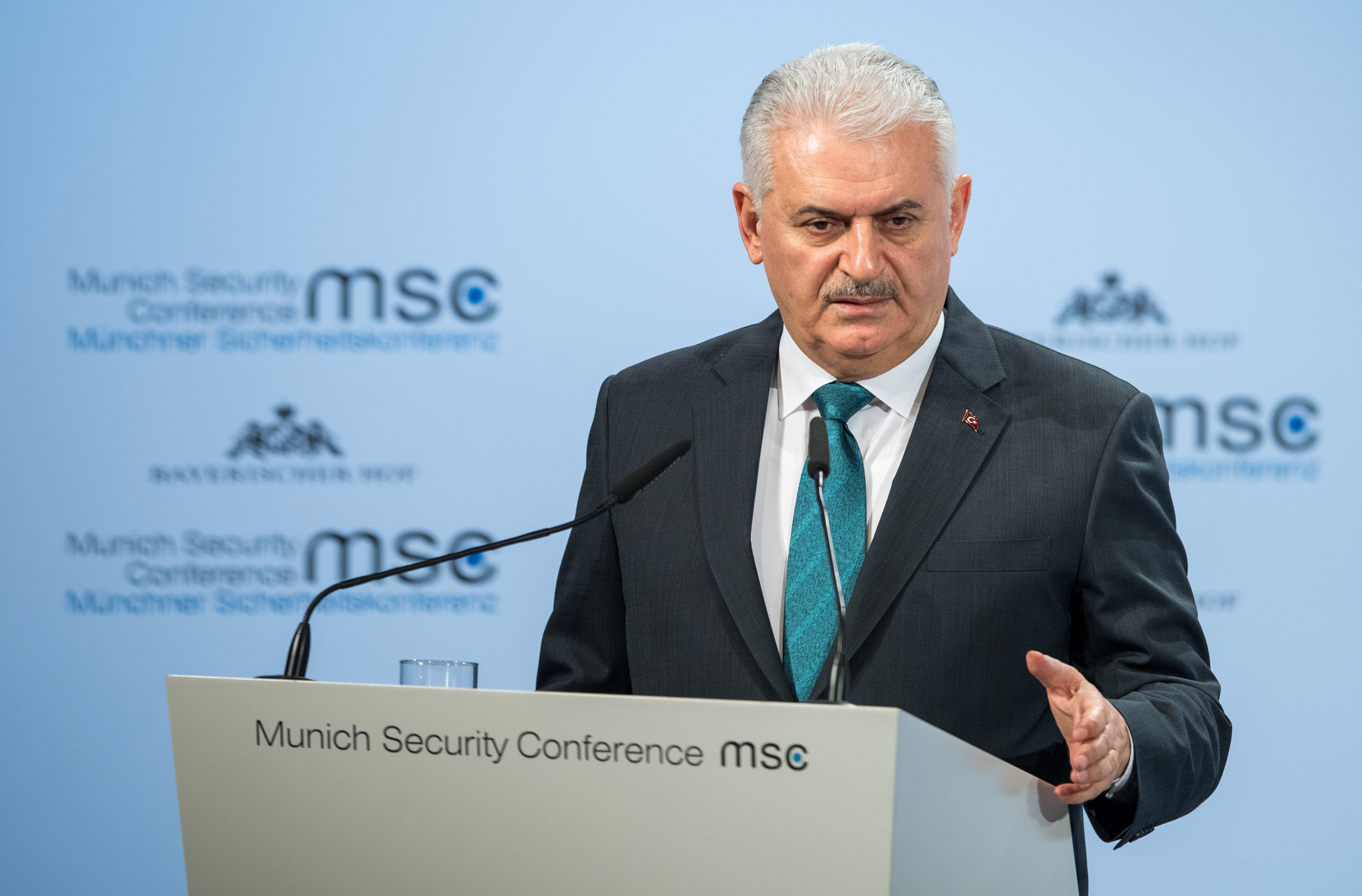
Yıldırım during the MSC 2018

Yıldırım has been described as a 'technocrat' with unwavering loyalty to Erdoğan, in contrast to Davutoğlu who had been internationally known for his foreign policy vision. As a result, he is expected to act as a 'secretary' to the president as opposed to Davutoğlu's perceivably more independent premiership. In his candidate speech at the 2016 AKP Congress, he emphasised the need to 'legally enforce the de facto situation' by establishing an executive presidency and writing a new constitution, implying that Erdoğan, despite being required by the constitution to be politically neutral, already was effectively the de facto executive president of Turkey. following Davutoğlu's resignation, AKP Member of Parliament Aydın Ünal stated that the next prime minister would focus on technical implementation only with Erdoğan dictating government policy.

Unveiling his cabinet ministers, Yıldırım's government was noted for consisting entirely of Erdoğan-loyalist ministers and immediately earned the nickname 'Presidential Cabinet' from political analysts in Ankara. It was reported that Yıldırım had prepared the cabinet list with Erdoğan on 23 May, a day before his government was ratified, with pro-Erdoğan politicians such as Nurettin Canikli and Nihat Zeybekci returning to the cabinet having been left out by Ahmet Davutoğlu. The cabinet was described as 'compliant' and as one that would 'take decisions quickly and completely focused on policy implementation.' His government won the vote of confidence of Parliament on 29 May, with 315 votes in favour to 138 against.

Yıldırım is the first prime minister in 20 years to come from an engineering background. The previous prime minister to have originated from a background in engineering was Necmettin Erbakan, who served as prime minister from 1996 to 1997.

=== Resignation of Ahmet Davutoğlu ===
On 5 May 2016, Prime Minister Ahmet Davutoğlu announced that he would be stepping down as AKP leader and would not stand as a candidate in the subsequent party leadership election. The announcement came after several days of speculation that relations between Davutoğlu and Erdoğan had declined significantly over the latter's insistence of an executive presidency system of government that would have seen Davutoğlu's office effectively abolished. In April 2016, a WordPress blog named the Pelican files were released by unnamed supporters of Erdoğan, detailing 27 different points of disagreement between the two men. These included Davutoğlu's domestic and foreign policies, disagreements over the AKP's election candidate lists for the June 2015 general election and concerns that Davutoğlu was attempting to establish his own support base in rival to Erdoğan. A similar disagreement between Erdoğan and Davutoğlu regarding the unified candidate list for the party Central Executive Committee during the 5th AKP Ordinary Congress in 2015 almost prompted Yıldırım to run against him.

=== Election as AKP leader ===
Following the announcement of Davutoğlu's resignation, Yıldırım emerged as the frontrunner in the field of potential successors, which included Erdoğan's son-in-law and Energy Minister Berat Albayrak amongst other senior AKP politicians known for their loyalty to Erdoğan. On 16 May, 353 AKP provincial, district, youth and women's wing representatives were invited to the party headquarters to conduct an internal poll on their preferred next leader, with Yıldırım topping the preferences of the 315 representatives attending. On 17 May, a similar poll was conducted with the AKP's parliamentary group. Despite the internal party opinion polling, President Erdoğan was observed to have effectively hand-picked Yıldırım to succeed Davutoğlu due to him being a close ally for two decades.

On 19 May 2016, Yıldırım was announced as the sole candidate for the Justice and Development Party leadership by the party Central Executive Committee (MKYK). He was elected as leader unopposed during the party's 2nd Extraordinary Congress on 22 May 2016, winning 1,405 of the 1,411 votes (with the remaining 6 being declared invalid or blank). A new Central Executive Board was elected alongside the party leader, with numerous senior AKP politicians, some of which had been seen as potential leadership candidates alongside Yıldırım, being left off the unified list.

=== Executive Presidency and new constitution ===
Delivering a statement on his government's program shortly after being appointed as prime minister on 24 May 2016, Yıldırım set out the main goals of his government to abolish the parliamentary system and bring about an executive presidency, which would require 330 of 550 votes in Parliament to hold a referendum or 367 votes to enact directly without the need for a referendum. Soon after becoming prime minister, Yıldırım claimed that the fact that the president was now elected by popular vote rather than by Parliament had created a power struggle and confusion amongst the population, resulting in the need for a transition to an executive presidency.

During his first speech to the AKP parliamentary group since becoming prime minister, Yıldırım announced that his government would begin work on drafting a new constitution with a matter of urgency, claiming that the current Constitution of Turkey, which was written during the 1980 coup d'état, was outdated for the AKP's 2023 vision for the centenary of the establishment of the Turkish Republic. He called on opposition parties to start working together again with the AKP to write a joint constitution, with the all-party constitutional commission having been abandoned by the main opposition Republican People's Party (CHP) under Davutoğlu's premiership over disagreements regarding the presidential system.

=== Economic policy ===
Following economic uncertainty due to the unstable political situation in Turkey as well as a bleak economic outlook for the Eurozone, Yıldırım delegated the government's economic policy to Ministers who were well known and trusted by the financial sector. In contrast to predictions that they would be left out of the cabinet, Mehmet Şimşek was re-appointed Deputy Prime Minister responsible for the economy while Naci Ağbal remained as Minister of Finance amid reports that the position would be given to Erdoğan's son-in-law Berat Albayrak. Yıldırım was succeeded by Ahmet Arslan as the Minister of Transport, Maritime and Communication, which was seen as a sign that the new government would prioritise investment on transport infrastructure due to Arslan's participation in previous transport projects such as Marmaray. Erdoğan loyalist Nihat Zeybekci was re-appointed Minister of the Economy, having been known to share interest rate policies similar to those of Erdoğan. Numerous economic responsibilities of Deputy Prime Minister Mehmet Şimşek were delegated to co-deputy Prime Minister Nurettin Canikli or to Yıldırım himself.

=== Foreign policy ===
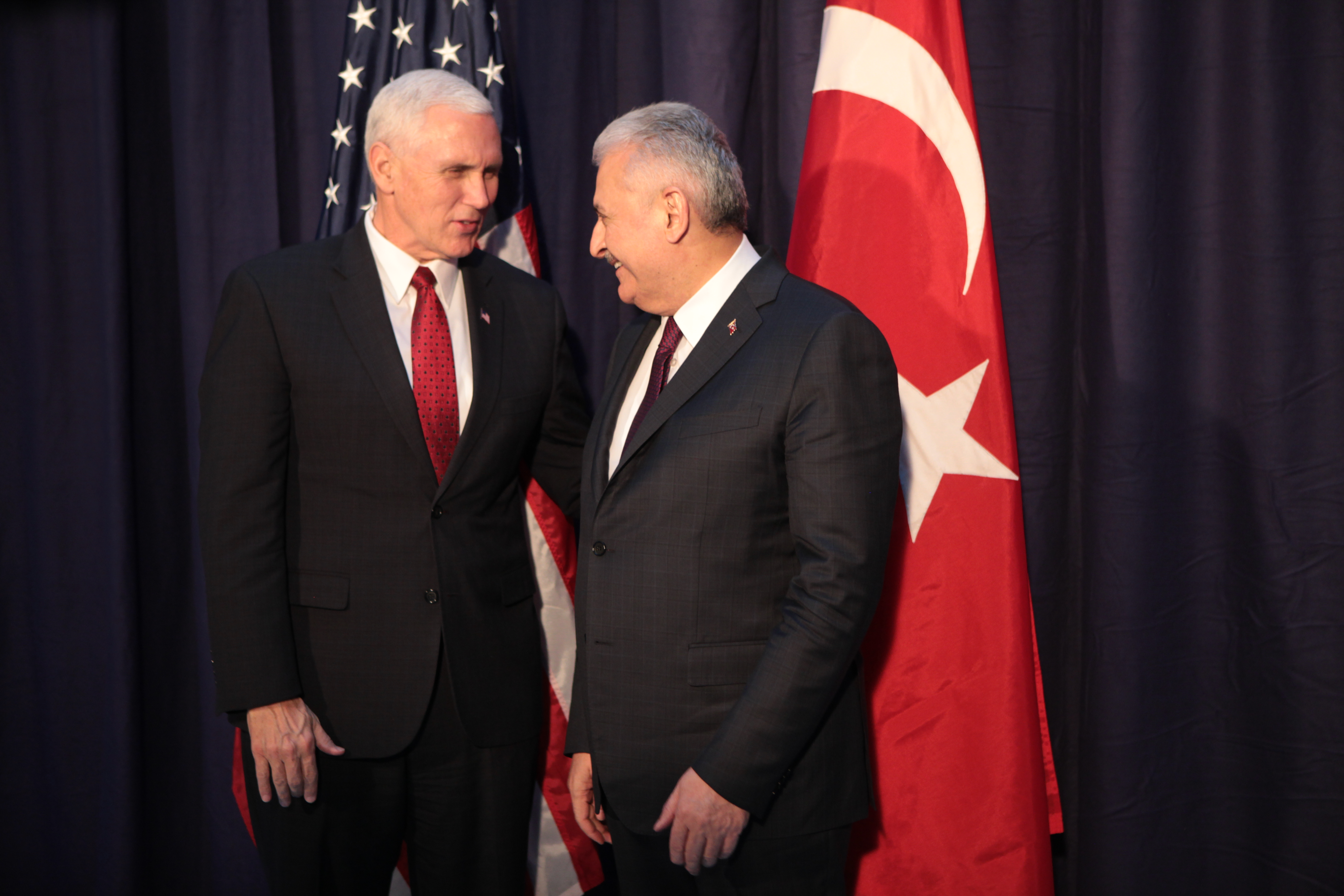
Yıldırım with U.S. Vice President Mike Pence, 18 February 2017

Shortly after taking office as prime minister, Yıldırım gave an overview of the foreign policy that his government would follow. He claimed that regional problems increased the importance of Turkey as a regional power, further claiming that he would follow the 'simple' foreign policy goal of increasing the number of allies and decreasing the number of enemies in the region. His speech was seen as a reference to the increasing isolation of Turkey on the world stage and the growing hostility of other countries towards the AKP government. Commentators claimed that Yıldırım could pursue a 'revisionist' foreign policy with the consent of Erdoğan, departing from the previous foreign policy ideals of the AKP, in an attempt to end both Turkey's international isolation and domestic problems caused by the AKP's responses to events such as the Syrian Civil War.

==== European Union ====
Following Yıldırım's election as AKP leader on 22 May, the European Union released a statement on 23 May congratulating him and calling for the new government to work towards implementing the migrant deal agreed on 18 March. On 25 May 2016, he claimed that Turkey was meeting all the standards for EU membership, but was being met by a "cyclical rapprochement" and a "negative discriminatory process". He called on the EU to end the 'double standards' shown against Turkey.

In response to deadlock in reaching a deal with the EU regarding the European migrant crisis, Yıldırım called on the EU to keep its promise to grant Turkish citizens access to member countries without a visa as was initially agreed. The EU declared that Turkey would have to change its terror laws for the deal to take place despite the initial agreement, a condition met with strong opposition by President Recep Tayyip Erdoğan. Referring to the fight against terrorism, Yıldırım's new minister for EU affairs Ömer Çelik once again criticized the EU's "double standards" and warned that Turkey's relations with the EU were very important, but not the country's "sole option". Foreign minister Mevlüt Çavuşoğlu doubled down on Turkey not being "bluffing" or uttering "threats" when it says it could suspend all agreements signed with the EU, including the readmission agreement.

==== Germany genocide recognition ====
On 2 June 2016, the German Bundestag voted in favour of a motion jointly proposed by the Christian Democratic Union (CDU), the Social Democratic Party of Germany (SPD) and the Green Party that officially recognised the events concerning the mass deportation and killings of Armenians by the Ottoman Empire in 1915 as a Genocide, in line with a similar decision taken by the European Parliament a year before. Prior to the decision, Prime Minister Yıldırım claimed that he had warned German chancellor Angela Merkel that Germany would be undergoing a 'friendship test with Turkey' during the vote and that such a decision would be irrational and detrimental to relations between the two countries.

In response, the government enacted similar measures that had been taken against the previous 29 countries that had recognised the Armenian genocide, beginning with the recalling of the Turkish ambassador in Berlin back to Turkey (though presumably on a temporary basis). The German Ambassador to Turkey was also summoned to the Ministry of Foreign Affairs to be presented with a letter of strong condemnation that refused to recognise the decision in line with Turkey's claim that only historians should have a say on historical events, not parliamentarians. It was also expected that Germany would enter Turkey's 'red list' of states that they would not follow close partnerships with, especially in the fields of defence and industry on a temporary basis.

In response to the German Parliament's decision, Prime Minister Yıldırım made a statement criticising Germany and claiming that there was no past historical event that the Turkish people are ashamed of. He also called the decision 'faulty' and reiterated that Turkey would not accept its legitimacy. Deputy Prime Minister Numan Kurtulmuş branded the actions of the German Parliament as 'distorted and baseless', calling it a 'historical mistake.' and warning that it was not compliant with Turkey-Germany relations. In response, Merkel reiterated that the relations between Germany and Turkey remained strong.

==== Russia ====
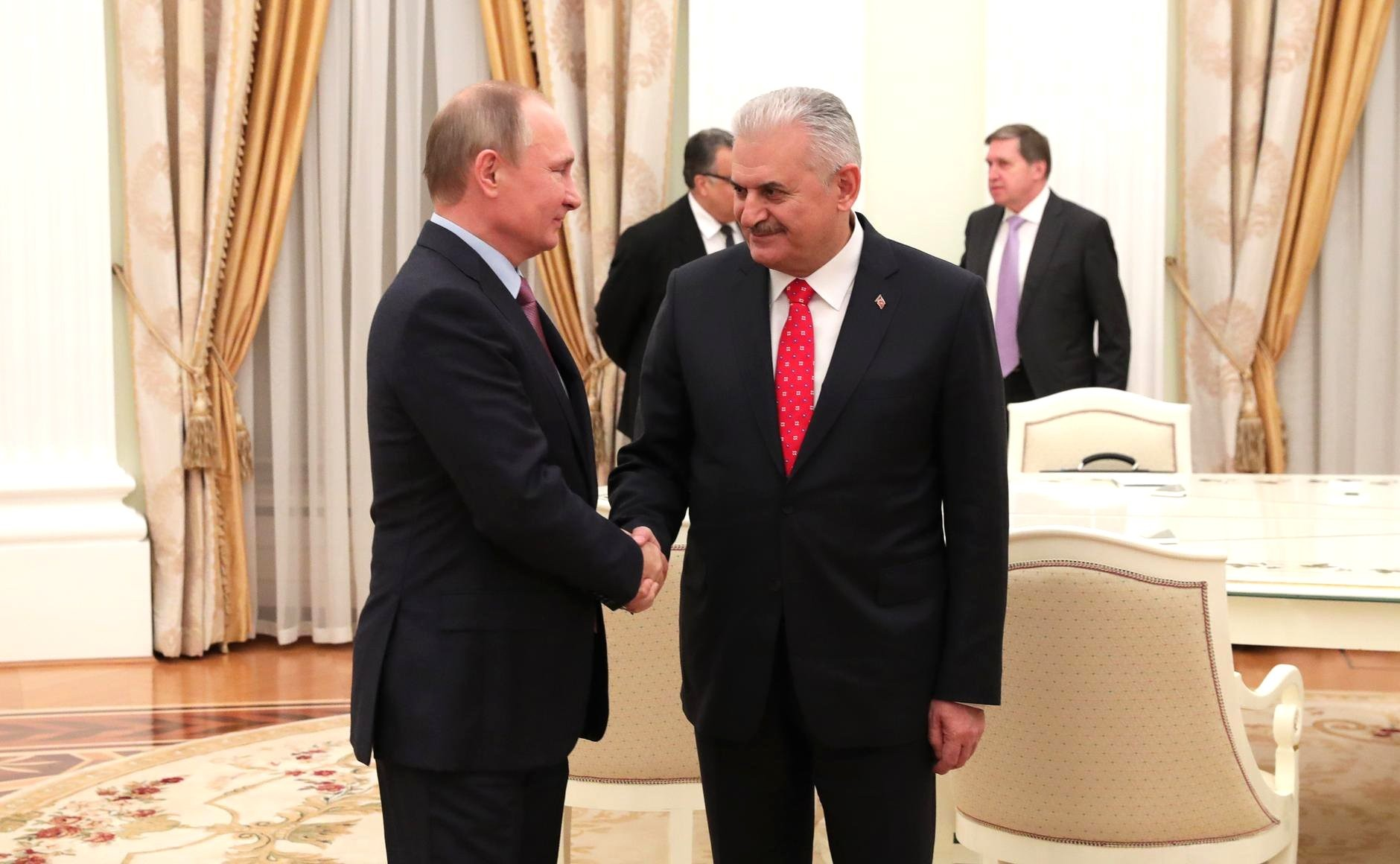
Yıldırım with Russian president Vladimir Putin, 6 December 2016

As part of the new government's program, Yıldırım announced plans to keep open channels for mutual dialogue with Russia in an attempt to normalise relations on the basis of common interests. Turkish relations with Russia deteriorated sharply in November 2015 after Turkey shot down a Russian fighter jet claiming that it had violated Turkish Airspace. The deterioration in relations also caused economic and trade relations between the two countries to decline. It was expected that 'normalisation' of economic relations with Russia would be one of the most important responsibilities of the new government.

In response to the appointment of Yıldırım as prime minister, the deputy president of the Federation Council Foreign Policy Committee Vladimir Cabarov claimed that a new prime minister would not result in any changes to Turkey-Russia relations, claiming that Recep Tayyip Erdoğan was effectively the main policy-maker in Turkey and that his past actions had 'burnt all bridges' with Russia. He also referred to Yıldırım's close relations with Erdoğan and claimed that any attempts to reconcile with Russia would not be initiated at Yıldırım's own accord. The same summit saw the organisation renamed from the Turkic Council to the Organization of Turkic States (TDT).

== Later career ==
On 12 November 2021, at the Turkic Council's 8th Summit in Istanbul, Erdoğan announced Yıldırım appointment as Turkey's representative, its "aksakal" (elder), to the organization newly formalised Council of Elders (''Aksakallar Konseyi''), a consultative body drawing on traditional practice of eldership found across Turkic states. Yıldırım went on to Chair the Council of Elders itself. In his capacity Yıldırım has represented Turkey at subsequent Organization of Turkic States summits, including the 9th summit in Samarkand, Uzbekistan, in November 2022, and has made visits to fellow member states, including a 2022 visit to Kyrgyzstan, where he met with that country's economy and transport ministers.

== Personal life ==
Yıldırım has been married to retired teacher Semiha Yıldırım since 1976 and has three children, Erkan, Ahmet and Baran. A primary school established by their three children in Çekmeköy, Istanbul was named after his wife, 'Öğretmen Semiha Yıldırım İlkokulu', and was opened on 24 November 2012. Semiha Yıldırım is also active in the Justice and Development Party, having been seen at the establishment of the government's 'Soul Mountain' (Gönül Dağı) Project on 17 May 2016 sitting next to President Erdoğan's wife Emine Erdoğan. He speaks Turkish, English and French.

On 21 October 2022, he was hospitalized at a Baku hospital after being injured in a road accident while visiting Azerbaijan.

== Awards and honours ==
Yıldırım has been awarded Honorary doctorates by a number of Turkish universities, as well as by the World Maritime University, Malmö and Technische Universität Berlin.

2006

- Honorary Doctorate by the Girne American University, Kyrenia, Northern Cyprus (20 July)

2009

- Honorary Doctorate by the Ondokuz Mayıs University, Samsun (19 June)

2010

- Honorary Doctorate by the Cumhuriyet University, Sivas (7 May)
- Honorary Doctorate by the Bozok University, Yozgat (29 September)

2011

- Honorary Doctorate by the Anadolu University, Eskişehir (28 February)
- Honorary Doctorate by the Erzincan University (12 September)
- Honorary Doctorate by the Kırklareli University (20 September)
- Honorary Doctorate by Technische Universität Berlin (23 December)

2012

- Honorary Doctorate by the Pamukkale University, Denizli (6 June)
- Honorary Doctorate by the World Maritime University, Malmö (2 December)

2013

- Honorary Doctorate by the Okan University, Istanbul (22 March)

2019

- Honorary Doctorate by the Yalova University, Yalova (11 October)

== Notes ==
Political offices
Preceded by Naci Kınacıoğlu	Minister of Transport; 2002–2007	Succeeded by İsmet Yılmaz
Preceded by İsmet Yılmaz	Minister of Transport; 2007–2011	Succeeded by Habip Soluk
Preceded by Habip Soluk	Minister of Transport; 2011	Position abolished
Position established	Minister of Transport, Maritime and Communication; 2011–2013	Succeeded by Lütfi Elvan
Preceded by Feridun Bilgin	Minister of Transport, Maritime and Communication; 2015–2016	Succeeded by Ahmet Arslan
Preceded by Ahmet Davutoğlu	Prime Minister of Turkey; 2016–2018	Position abolished
Preceded by İsmail Kahraman	Speaker of the Grand National Assembly; 2018–2019	Succeeded by Mustafa Şentop
Party political offices
Preceded by Ahmet Davutoğlu	Leader of the Justice and Development Party; 2016–2017	Succeeded by Recep Tayyip Erdoğan
