= Lazistan Eyalet =

Proposed Turkish administrative division reform

The Lazistan Eyalet (or Lazistan; Turkish: Lazistan eyaleti) is the theoretical reform of Turkey's administrative division proposed by the Recep Tayyip Erdoğan in 2013. These reforms constitute a significant change in territorial administration and management of local services, aiming to give more autonomy to local governments across the country.

Erdoğan reportedly said in 2013, that the Ottoman Empire used to call the Black Sea region — “Lazistan”, which belonged to the Laz community, while the founding Parliament of the Republic of Turkey used to call the southeastern Anatolian region — “Kurdistan.” His remarks referring to the provincial administration of the Ottoman Empire was target of criticism since they could be interpreted as a sign of Erdoğan’s desire to implement a federal system. To challenge the opposition nationalists, Recep Tayyip Erdogan alluded to the Ottoman eyalet system of semi-autonomous provinces and recalled that during the Ottoman era there were eyalets called Kurdistan and Lazistan. In his opinion 'A powerful Turkey should never fear the state system', autonomous self-governance within the state of Turkey should be possible and would even be a source of strength for Turkey.
