= 2nd Justice and Development Party Extraordinary Congress =

Party election in Turkey

Justice and Development Party leadership election, 2016
- 22 May 2016
- Registered: 1,470 delegates
- Turnout: 96.0%
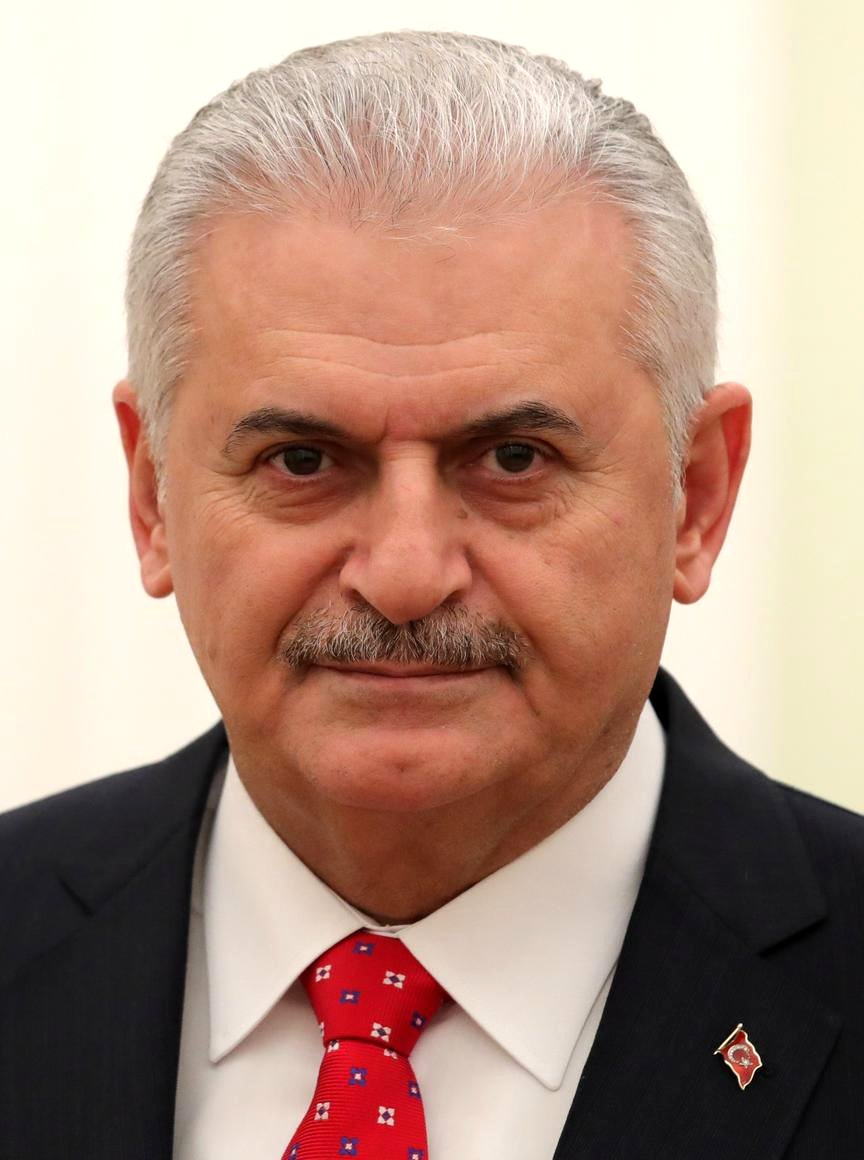
| Candidate | Binali Yıldırım |
| Party | AK Party |
| Constituency | İzmir (I) |
| Delegate vote | 1,405 |
| Percentage | 100% |
Leader before election
Ahmet Davutoğlu
AK Party
Elected Leader
Binali Yıldırım
AK Party

The 2nd Justice and Development Party Extraordinary Congress was a party convention of the ruling Justice and Development Party of Turkey held on 22 May 2016. The congress, announced on 4 May 2016, had been long speculated by politicians and political commentators who had observed a severe deterioration in relations between Prime Minister and incumbent AKP leader Ahmet Davutoğlu and the AKP's founder and former leader, President Recep Tayyip Erdoğan. Davutoğlu announced that he would not stand for re-election as party leader.

Transport and Communications Minister Binali Yıldırım was the sole candidate for the party leadership, announced by the AKP Central Executive Committee (MKYK) on 19 May 2016. Yıldırım had been collecting signatures to launch a leadership bid in time for the last Ordinary Congress of 2015, ceasing only when Davutoğlu and Erdoğan agreed on a joint list of Central Executive Decision Board candidates days before the congress took place. He was elected with 1,405 votes.

== Potential candidates ==
=== Pro-Erdoğan candidates ===
Media reports have indicated that the frontrunner would be handpicked by President Recep Tayyip Erdoğan. Ten potential candidates have been identified by political commentators.

By 16 May, Binali Yıldırım emerged as the frontrunner after a secret poll amongst AKP MPs allegedly placed him well ahead in terms of preference than the other candidates. It was alleged that the AKP headquarters sent memos to the provincial and district associations of the party announcing that Yıldırım would be the next leader.

- Binali Yıldırım ✓, Minister of Transport, Maritime and Communication and former special advisor to President Erdoğan
- Berat Albayrak, Minister of Energy and Natural Resources and son-in-law of President Erdoğan
- Numan Kurtulmuş, Deputy Prime Minister of Turkey and former leader of the People's Voice Party
- Bekir Bozdağ, Minister of Justice and former Deputy Prime Minister of Turkey
- Mehmet Müezzinoğlu, Minister of Health
- Mustafa Şentop, Chair of the Constitutional Commission of the Grand National Assembly of Turkey
- Efkan Ala, Minister of the Interior
- Mehmet Ali Şahin, former Speaker of the Grand National Assembly, former Deputy Prime Minister of Turkey and former Minister of Justice
- Faruk Çelik, Minister of Food, Agriculture and Livestock and former Minister of Labour and Social Security
- İsmet Yılmaz, Minister of National Defence and former Speaker of the Grand National Assembly
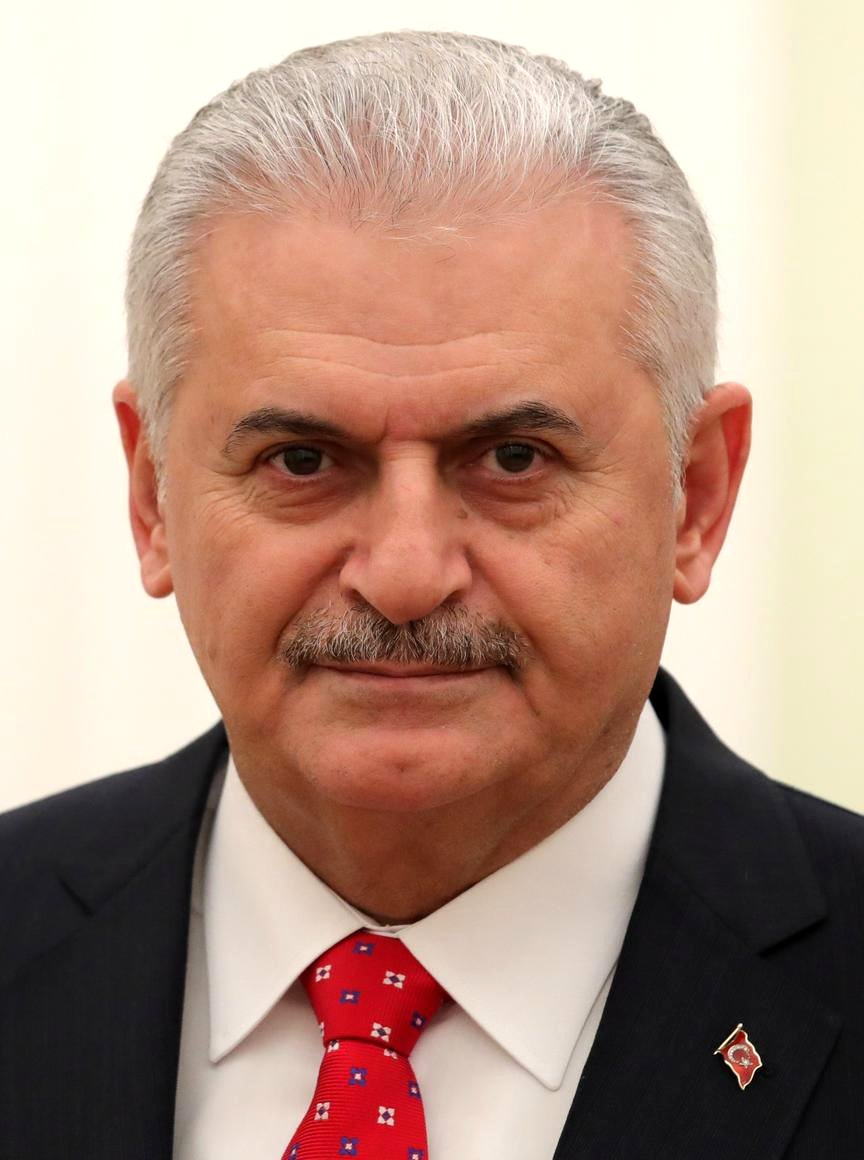
Binali Yıldırım ✓, Minister of Transport, Maritime and Communication and former special advisor to President Erdoğan

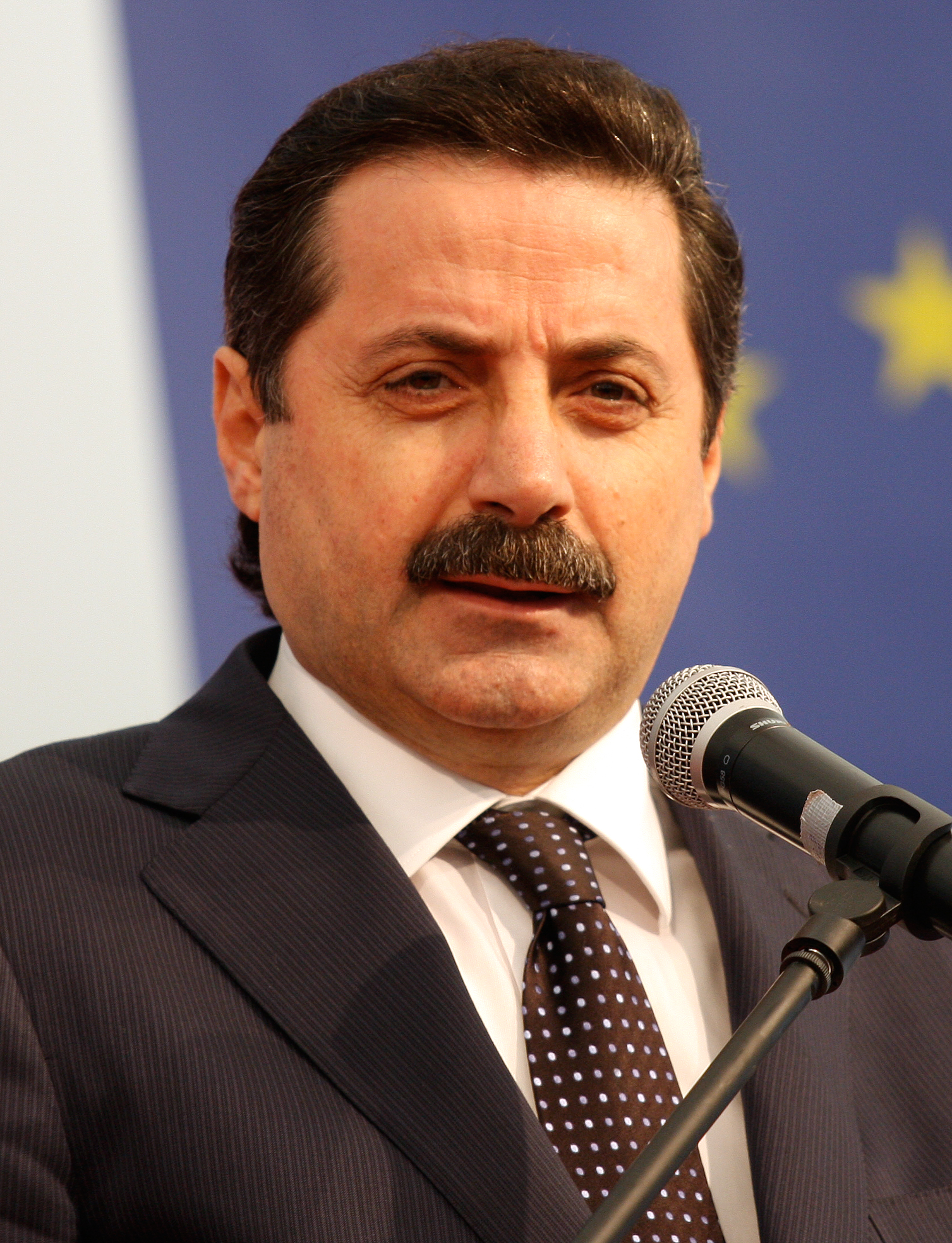
Faruk Çelik, Minister of Food, Agriculture and Livestock and former Minister of Labour and Social Security

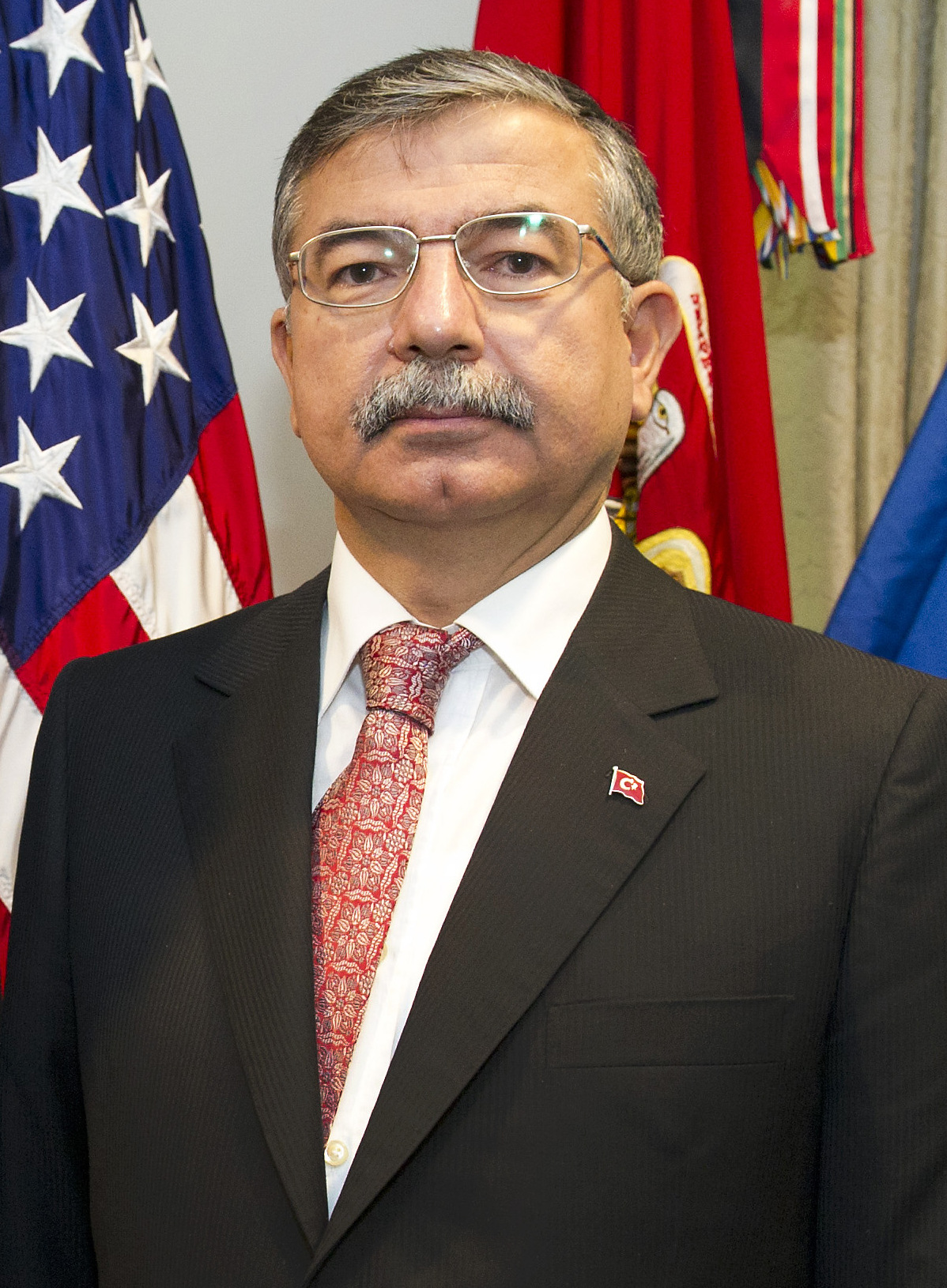
İsmet Yılmaz, Minister of National Defence and former Speaker of the Grand National Assembly

=== Erdoğan-critical candidates ===
It has been reported that if the inner-party opposition that is critical to Erdoğan's dominance is unhappy with the emerging candidate, they would field their own candidate. Their most likely candidate is expected to be Ali Babacan, who is internationally recognised for his economic policies while serving as a government minister.

- Ali Babacan, former Minister of the Economy, former Minister of Foreign Affairs and former Deputy Prime Minister of Turkey
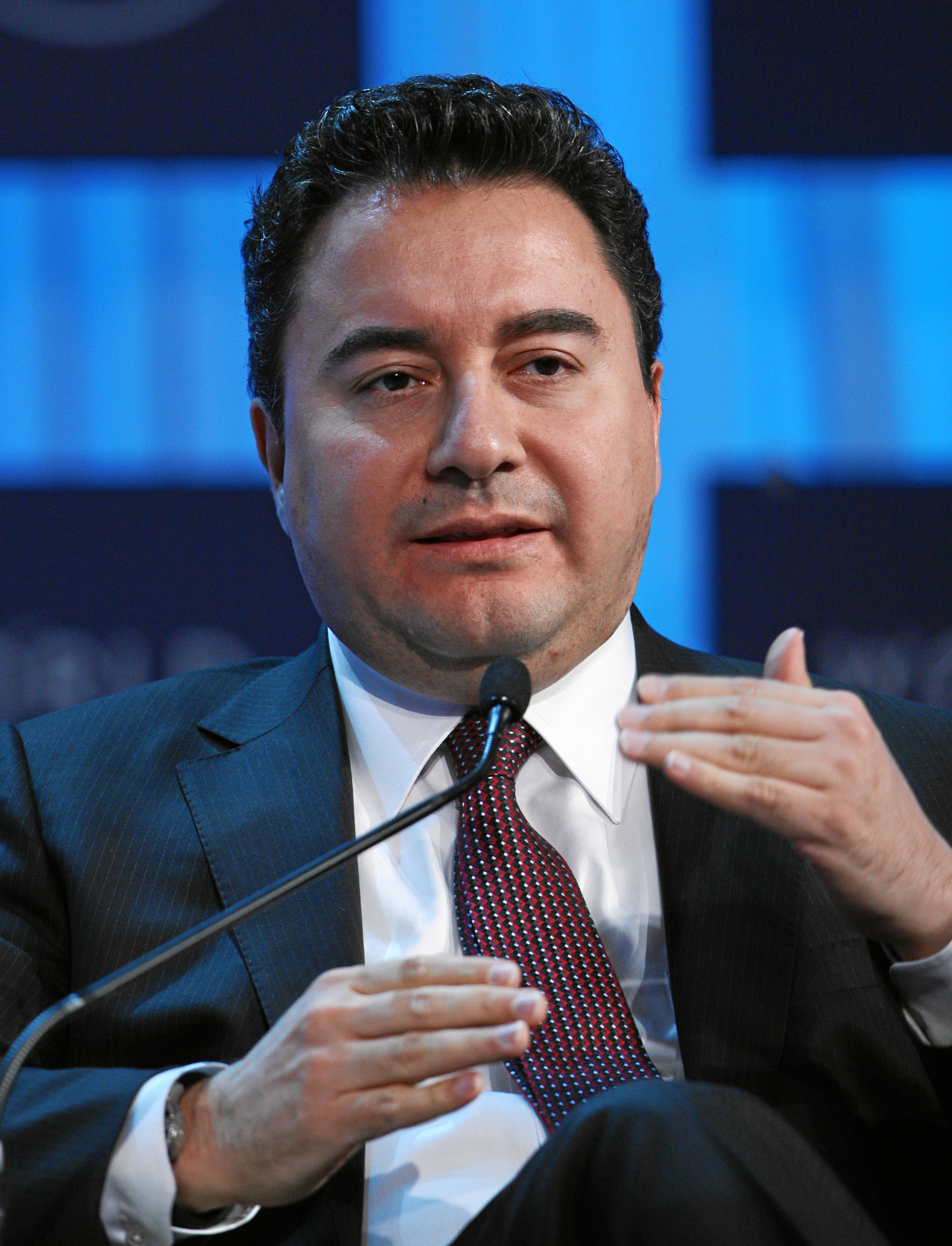
Ali Babacan, former Minister of the Economy, former Minister of Foreign Affairs and former Deputy Prime Minister of Turkey

== Results ==
| Candidate | Votes | Percentage |
|---|---|---|
| Binali Yıldırım | 1,405 | 100.0 |
| Invalid/blank votes | 6 | – |
| Total | 1,411 | 100.0 |
| Number of delegates/turnout | 1,470 | 96.0 |
Source: Haberler.com
