= Feridun Bilgin =

Turkish civil servant and politician

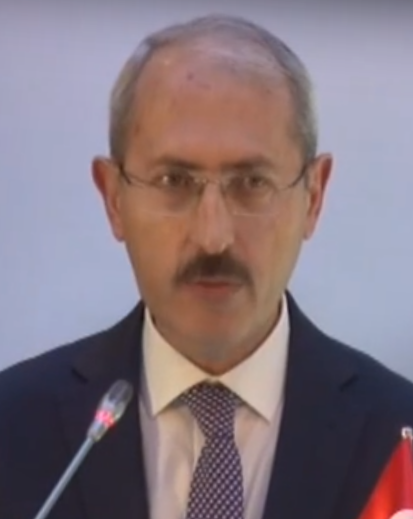
- A picture of Feridunbilgin standing before a microphone to give a speech.

3rd Minister of Transport, Maritime and Communication
- In office 7 March 2015 – 17 November 2015
- Prime Minister: Ahmet Davutoğlu
- Deputy: Yahya Baş
- Preceded by: Lütfi Elvan
- Succeeded by: Binali Yıldırım

Undersecretary to the Ministry of Transport, Maritime and Communication
- In office 29 April 2014 – 7 March 2015
- Minister: Lütfi Elvan
- Preceded by: Habip Soluk
- Succeeded by: Hamdi Yıldırım

Personal details
- Born: Feridun Bilgin; 1964 (age 61–62) Sivas, Turkey
- Party: Independent (2014–2019); Future Party
- Education: Istanbul Technical University; Yıldız Technical University
- Occupation: Civil servant
- Cabinet: 62nd, 63rd
- Website: Government website

Feridun Bilgin (born 1964) is a Turkish civil servant and politician who served as the Minister of Transport, Maritime and Communication of Turkey from 7 March to 17 November 2015. Formerly the Undersecretary to the Ministry, Bilgin took over from the Justice and Development Party minister Lütfi Elvan as required by Article 114 of the Turkish constitution. He was one of the founders of the newly founded Future Party in 2019.

== Early life and career ==
Bilgin was born in Sivas in 1964 and graduated from Istanbul Technical University's Faculty of Electricity and Electronics in 1985. Between 1985 and 1987, he did a Master's degree at the Yıldız Technical University Department of Electrical Engineering. In 1986, he began working at the State Planning Organisation as an advisor to the Manager of Incentives and Implementation. He became a planning expert in 1991 and a team manager in 1992. In 1992, he became a branch manager of the Incentives and Implementation department of the Treasury and Foreign Trade Undersecretariat. Between 1996 and 1999, he was the Economic Advisor to the Turkish Embassy in the Republic of Macedonia. In 2003, he became the interim Manager of the Incentives and Implementation Department of the Treasury Undersecretariat, only to be fully confirmed in 2007. Between 2010 and 2014, Bilgin was the Assistant Secretary to the Treasury and became the Undersecretary to the Minister of Transport, Maritime and Communication after the retirement of his predecessor, Habip Soluk.

== Minister of Transport ==
With the Constitution requiring that the serving partisan Minister should vacate his position to his or her Undersecretary at least three months before a general election, Bilgin took over from Lütfi Elvan as Minister on 7 March 2015 and is due to serve until a new government is formed after the election. The other ministers who replaced partisan ministers due to the constitutional requirement were Sebahattin Öztürk, who replaced Efkan Ala as the Minister of the Interior and Kenan İpek, replacing Bekir Bozdağ as the Justice Minister.

== See also ==
- 62nd Government of Turkey
- Minister of Transport, Maritime and Communication
