= Semiha Yıldırım =

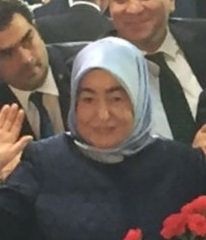

Spouse of the Prime Minister of Turkey
- In role 24 May 2016 – 9 July 2018
- Prime Minister: Binali Yıldırım
- Preceded by: Sare Davutoğlu
- Succeeded by: Position abolished

Personal details
- Born: 1954 (age 71–72) Kayıköy, Refahiye, Erzincan Province, Turkey
- Spouse: Binali Yıldırım (m. 1975)
- Children: 3
- Occupation: Teacher (1972–1993)

Semiha Yıldırım (born 1954) is a Turkish retired teacher. She is the wife of former Turkish prime minister Binali Yıldırım. The "Semiha Yıldırım Primary School" in Çekmeköy was built by former school children and commissioned by the Ministry of Education. The school is named in her honor.

== Life ==
Semiha Yıldırım was born in 1954 in Kayıköy of Refahiye district in Erzincan. After finishing her primary and secondary education, she entered the school for teachers training and graduated in 1972. She started teaching at a school in her hometown at Refahiye district. Until 1993 Yıldırım continued teaching at various schools across Turkey. After her retirement, she continued supporting voluntary education projects. A primary school in Istanbul is named after her.

== Personal life ==
She is married to Turkey's 27th Prime Minister Binali Yıldırım. Together they raised three children: Erkan Yıldırım, Ahmet Yıldırım and Büşra Yıldırım. She is a devout Sunni Muslim, and once she stated: "Islam should conquer everywhere".

== Awards ==
- 2012 - "Mother of the Year", İzmir Education Volunteers Association
