= Yüksel Coşkunyürek =

Turkish politician (born 1965)

Yüksel Coşkunyürek MP

Member of the Grand National Assembly
- In office 3 November 2002 – 12 June 2011
- Constituency: Bolu (2002, 2007)

Deputy Minister of Transport, Maritime and Communication
- Incumbent
- Assumed office 27 May 2016
- Minister: Ahmet Arslan
- In office 23 December 2015 – 24 May 2016
- Minister: Binali Yıldırım
- Preceded by: Yahya Baş

Personal details
- Born: 15 March 1965 (age 61) Gerede, Bolu, Turkey
- Party: Justice and Development Party (AKP)
- Spouse: Ayşe Coşkunyürek
- Children: 4
- Education: Istanbul Technical University Sakarya Faculty of Engineering
- Occupation: Engineer and politician

Yüksel Coşkunyürek (born 15 March 1965) is a Turkish politician who has been Deputy Minister of Transport, Maritime and Communication since December 2015. He served as a Member of Parliament for Bolu as a member of the Justice and Development Party (AKP) between 2002 and 2011.

He returned to the 28th Parliament of Turkey in the 2023 Turkish parliamentary election, representing Bolu.

Political offices
| Preceded by Yahya Baş | Deputy Minister of Transport, Maritime and Communication; 23 December 2015 – 24 May 2016; 27 May 2016 – present | Incumbent |
