= Habip Soluk =

Turkish politician

Minister of Transport, Maritime and Communication
- In office 8 March 2011 – 6 July 2011
- Prime Minister: Recep Tayyip Erdoğan
- Preceded by: Binali Yıldırım
- Succeeded by: Binali Yıldırım

Undersecretary to the Transport, Maritime and Communication Ministry
- In office 21 November 2007 – 29 April 2014
- Minister: Binali Yıldırım
- Preceded by: İbrahim Şahin
- Succeeded by: Feridun Bilgin

Personal details
- Born: Mehmet Habip Soluk; 1950 (age 75–76) Sivas, Turkey
- Party: Independent; Justice and Development Party (2015)
- Education: Yıldız Technical University
- Occupation: Civil servant
- Website: Government website

Mehmet Habip Soluk (born 1950) is a Turkish politician and civil servant who served as the non-partisan Minister of Transport, Maritime and Communication between 8 March 2011 and 6 July 2011 during the final months of Prime Minister Recep Tayyip Erdoğan's second government. As the Undersecretary to the Ministry of Transport, Maritime and Communication, he took over as Minister from Justice and Development Party politician Binali Yıldırım three months before the 2011 general election as required by Article 114 of the Turkish Constitution. He is, formally, of no political affiliation, though this was proven to be untrue when he applied to become a Justice and Development Party (AKP) parliamentary candidate for the June 2015 general election.

== Early life and career ==
Soluk graduated from Yıldız Technical University as a mechanical engineer, working in the maritime sector in numerous positions. At one point, he became the Deputy CEO of PTT, the Turkish state postal service. He was made the deputy Undersecretary of the Transport, Maritime and Communication Ministry, taking over as Undersecretary after his predecessor İbrahim Şahin became the General Director of the Turkish Radio and Television Corporation (TRT).

== Minister of Transport ==
Soluk became the Minister of Transport, Maritime and Communication on 8 March 2011, three months before the 2011 general election, as required by Article 114 of the Turkish Constitution. He served until Prime Minister Recep Tayyip Erdoğan formed his third government on 6 July, having been re-elected for a third term. Soluk was both preceded and succeeded by Binali Yıldırım.

== Later life ==
After serving as the Minister of Transport, Soluk continued to serve as the Undersecretary to the Ministry until 2014, when he retired. In 2015, he applied to become a Justice and Development Party candidate from the electoral district of Sivas, his hometown, but failed to secure nomination.

== See also ==
- Minister of Transport, Maritime and Communication
- Justice and Development Party
