= Pamukova train derailment =

2004 train accident in Sakarya, Turkey

Coordinates: 40.47081°N 30.05745°E

Details
- Date: July 22, 2004; 19:45 EEST
- Location: Mekece, Pamukova, Sakarya; 182 km (113 mi) from Istanbul
- Country: Turkey
- Line: Istanbul-Ankara railway
- Operator: Turkish State Railways (TCDD)
- Incident type: Derailment
- Cause: Excessive speed

Statistics
- Trains: 1
- Passengers: 234
- Crew: 9
- Deaths: 41
- Injured: 80
- Damage: 4 cars

The Pamukova train derailment was a fatal railway accident which occurred in 2004 at Pamukova district of Sakarya Province in northwestern Turkey when a higher speed train derailed, at which 41 passengers were killed and 80 injured.

== Accident ==
In the early 2000s, a project was started to construct higher-speed rail lines in Turkey, at first between the highest-populated cities Istanbul and Ankara. At 19:45 EEST on July 22, 2004, a higher-speed train named after Yakup Kadri Karaosmanoğlu, heading to Ankara from Haydarpaşa, Istanbul, derailed near Mekece village of Pamukova, Sakarya during one of its first journeys, 182 km (113 mi) away from Istanbul. Of the 234 passengers and nine crew on board, 41 were killed and 80 injured.

The accident investigation revealed that the train ran into a curve with a radius of 345 m (1,132 ft) near Mekece railway station with a speed of 132 km/h (82 mph), where the speed limit was 80 km/h (50 mph). The speeding caused the left wheel of the second passenger car to spring off the track. The train's balance quickly deteriorated, and two following cars coupled to the derailed car drifted sideways. Four cars were overturned, while two cars were damaged heavily, having crashed into each other. The locomotive and the first car remained undamaged on the track, and were taken to Osmaneli railway station after the accident.

== Aftermath ==
An analysis carried out by the railway simulation software Adams/Rail showed that a train running at 132 km/h (82 mph) would derail at the curve, while one at a speed of 130 km/h (81 mph) would pass the spot without derailing.

There were no warning signs or signals available at the accident scene. The investigation commission reported that the total journey duration, which was 5 hours and 15 minutes, was too short for the route. The new suggested time was 6 hours. Finally, it was determined that the unsuitable railway infrastructure was one of the main factors that influenced the accident. At the time of the opening of the line one month before, experts had warned the government to modernize the infrastructure before putting higher-speed trains in service.

Immediately after the accident, Binali Yıldırım, the Minister of Transport, Maritime and Communication, was criticized harshly in the public square, and his resignation was demanded. However, he rejected the demands and remained in his office.

Ten years after the accident, the court found the two engineers of the train guilty of negligence causing death. However, since the trial was ruled on over seven-and-half years following the date of the accident, the sentences could not be executed according to Turkish law.
