= Yahya Baş =

Turkish politician (1952–2023)

Yahya Baş MP

Member of the Grand National Assembly
- In office 3 November 2002 – 22 July 2007
- Constituency: İstanbul (III) (2002)

1st Deputy Minister of Transport, Maritime and Communication
- In office 13 June 2012 – 29 August 2014
- Minister: Binali Yıldırım; Lütfi Elvan
- Preceded by: Position established
- In office 12 September 2014 – 25 August 2015
- Minister: Lütfi Elvan; Feridun Bilgin
- Succeeded by: Yüksel Coşkunyürek

1st Mayor of Güngören
- In office 1992–2002
- Preceded by: District established
- Succeeded by: İbrahim Kurşun

Personal details
- Born: 1952 Trabzon, Turkey
- Died: 9 January 2023 (aged 71)
- Party: Welfare Party (RP); Virtue Party (FP); Justice and Development Party (AKP)
- Education: İstanbul Higher Institute of Islam; İstanbul State Engineering and Architectural Academy

Yahya Baş (1952 – 9 January 2023) was a Turkish politician who served as a Member of Parliament for İstanbul (III) from Justice and Development Party (AKP) between 2002 and 2007. He was the first Deputy Minister of Transport, Maritime and Communication between 2012 and 2015 at 61st and 62nd Cabinets. He also was the first Mayor of Güngören between 1992 and 2002.

Political offices
New office	1st Mayor of Güngören; 1992 – 2002	Succeeded by İbrahim Kurşun
New office	1st Deputy Minister of Transport, Maritime and Communication; 13 June 2012 – 29 August 2014; 11 September 2014 – 25 August 2015	Succeeded by Yüksel Coşkunyürek
