= Erzincan (electoral district) =

Electoral district for the Grand National Assembly of Turkey

Coordinates: 37°50′N 34°45′E

- electoral district for the Grand National Assembly of Turkey
- Erzincan shown within Turkey
- Province: Erzincan
- Electorate: 146,518

Current electoral district
- Created: 1923
- Seats: 2 Historical: 3 (1999–2007)
- Turnout at last election: 88.46%
- Representation
- AK Party: 1 / 2
- CHP: 1 / 2

Erzincan is an electoral district of the Grand National Assembly of Turkey. It elects two members of parliament (deputies) to represent the province of the same name for a four-year term by the D'Hondt method, a party-list proportional representation system.

== Members ==
Population reviews of each electoral district are conducted before each general election, which can lead to certain districts being granted a smaller or greater number of parliamentary seats. Erzincan's seats were reduced from three to two in 2011. The district was previously represented by the AKP's transport minister Binali Yıldırım from 2007 to 2011, who became an MP for İzmir in 2011.

MPs for Erzincan, 1999 onwards
Election	1999 (21st Parliament)	2002 (22nd Parliament)	2007 (23rd Parliament)	2011 (24th Parliament)	June 2015 (25th Parliament)
MP	Sebahattin Karakelle; DYP	Talip Kaban; AK Party	Sabahattin Karakelle; AK Party		Talha Erol Durmaz; AK Party
MP	Tehvit Karakaya; Virtue	Tehvit Karakaya; AK Party	Binali Yıldırım; AK Party	Muharrem Işık; CHP	Erdoğan Özyalçın; CHP
MP	Mihrali Aksu; MHP	Erol Tınastepe; CHP		No seat	

== General elections ==
=== 2011 ===
2011 general election: Erzincan
Party	Candidate	Votes	%	±%
AK Party	1 elected ▼1: 1. Sebahattin Karakelle ✓; 2. Burhan Çakır ✗	73,227	57.09	▲2.77
CHP	1 elected 0: 1. Muharrem Işık ✓; 2. Erdoğan Özyalçın ✗	38,921	30.34	▲6.42
MHP	None elected: 1. Dursun Çolak ✗; 2. Cemal Akyıldız ✗	11,938	9.31	▼2.12
SAADET	None elected: 1. Dursun Şimşek ✗; 2. Fikret Yıldırım ✗	1,144	0.89	▼1.11
Büyük Birlik	None elected: 1. Erdal Taşkın ✗; 2. Şahmettin Kılıç ✗	902	0.70	▲0.70
HAS Party	None elected: 1. Enis Başakın ✗; 2. Bahattin Seren ✗	748	0.58	▲0.58
DP	None elected: 1. Tuncay Sezer ✗; 2. Cengiz Pelen ✗	576	0.45	▼0.77
Labour	None elected: 1. Şengül Karadağ Bayhan ✗; 2. Nazire Dursun ✗	312	0.24	▲0.11
DYP	None elected: 1. Haydar Ayrangöl ✗; 2. Abdullah Han ✗	138	0.11	▲0.11
TKP	None elected: 1. Hüseyin Nurali ✗; 2. Göksel Ağbey ✗	105	0.08	▼0.08
DSP	None elected: 1. Volkan Özdemir ✗; 2. Engin Deniz ✗	101	0.08	N/A
Nationalist Conservative	None elected: 1. Erkan Karababa ✗; 2. Ali Özdoğan ✗	101	0.08	▲0.08
MP	None elected: 1. Bilal Aydın ✗; 2. Celal Okur ✗	28	0.02	▲0.02
Liberal Democrat	None elected: 1. Mahmut Celal Özcan ✗; 2. Güngör Durdu ✗	22	0.02	▲0.01
HEPAR	No candidates	0	0.00	0.00
Total votes		128,263	100.00	
Rejected ballots		1,769	1.36	▲0.74
Turnout		129,612	88.46	▲3.16
AK Party hold Majority		34,306	26.75	▼3.66

=== June 2015 ===
Abbr.	Party	Votes	%
AKP	Justice and Development Party	63,931	49.2%
CHP	Republican People's Party	33,156	25.5%
MHP	Nationalist Movement Party	21,691	16.7%
HDP	Peoples' Democratic Party	7,161	5.5%
	Other	3,991	3.1%
Total		129,930	
Turnout		86.65	
source: YSK

=== November 2015 ===
Abbr.	Party	Votes	%
AKP	Justice and Development Party	74,940	56.8%
CHP	Republican People's Party	36,740	27.8%
MHP	Nationalist Movement Party	13,372	10.1%
HDP	Peoples' Democratic Party	4,073	3.1%
	Other	2,925	2.2%
Total		132,050	
Turnout		87.79	
source: YSK

=== 2018 ===
Abbr.	Party	Votes	%
AKP	Justice and Development Party	63,013	43.7%
CHP	Republican People's Party	36,902	25.6%
MHP	Nationalist Movement Party	26,786	18.6%
HDP	Peoples' Democratic Party	7,615	5.3%
IYI	Good Party	5,983	4.2%
	Other	3,736	2.6%
Total		144,035	
Turnout		90.25	
source: YSK

== Presidential elections ==
=== 2014 ===
2014 presidential election: Erzincan
Party	Candidate	Votes	%
AK Party	Recep Tayyip Erdoğan	73,135	58.74
Independent	Ekmeleddin İhsanoğlu	46,309	37.20
HDP	Selahattin Demirtaş	5,057	4.06
Total votes		124,501	100.00
Rejected ballots		2,231	1.76
Turnout		126,732	81.82
Recep Tayyip Erdoğan win			
