= Istanbul Technical University Faculty of Naval Architecture and Ocean Engineering =

ITU Faculty of Naval Architecture and Ocean Engineering
- Type: Public school
- Established: 1943 department, 1971 school
- Dean: Prof. Dr. Ömer Kemal Kınacı
- Location: Istanbul, Turkey
- Campus: Urban
- Website: www.gidb.itu.edu.tr

ITU Faculty of Naval Architecture and Ocean Engineering was founded as an individual department in School of Mechanical Engineering in 1943. It was reorganized in 1971 as a separate school. Faculty has its own library in addition to Mustafa Inan Library.

The faculty has two departments today:

- Naval architecture and marine engineering
- Ocean engineering
