= 5th Justice and Development Party Ordinary Congress =

Party election in Turkey

2015 Justice and Development Party leadership election
- 12 September 2015
- Registered: 1,445 delegates
- Turnout: 94.1%
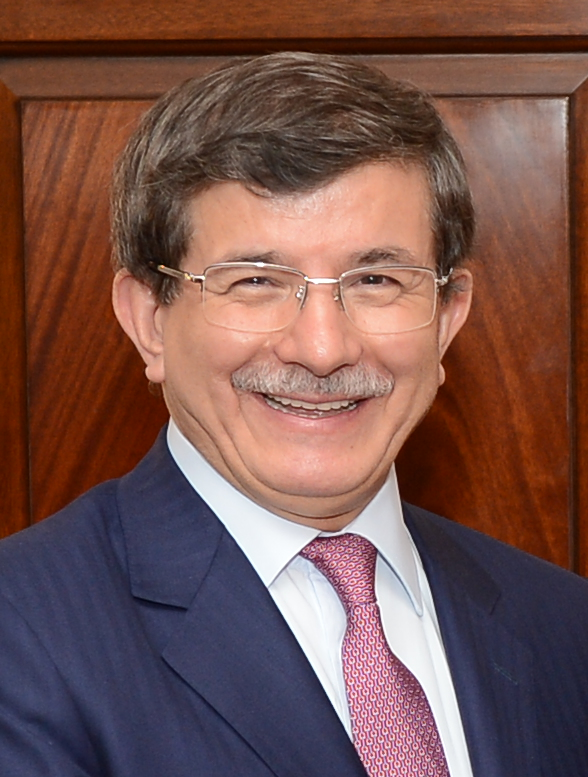
Candidate	Ahmet Davutoğlu
Party	AK Party
Constituency	Konya
Delegate vote	1,353
Percentage	100%
Leader before election
Ahmet Davutoğlu
AK Party
Elected Leader
Ahmet Davutoğlu
AK Party

The 5th Justice and Development Party Ordinary Congress was a party convention of the governing Turkish Justice and Development Party (AK Party) that took place on 12 September 2015. It was held six weeks before Turkey voted in a snap general election in November 2015. The agenda included motions to alter the party's by-laws to lift the three-term limit for the party's MPs who had been elected for a third time in the June 2015 general election, as well as the establishment of a 'Founding Principles Board'.

The party leader and Prime Minister Ahmet Davutoğlu declared his candidacy for re-election to the party leadership, with most commentators speculating that he would almost certainly be the only candidate. However, a few days before the Congress, it emerged that Binali Yıldırım, a former Transport Minister and Special Advisor to the President of Turkey, had explored a possible run for the party leadership. It was rumoured that Yıldırım had been asked to run by President Recep Tayyip Erdoğan due to a breakdown in relations with Davutoğlu. Yıldırım stated that had a '50% chance' of running. In the event that he did declare his candidacy, the congress would be the first ever to hold a leadership election with more than one candidate. However, after a disagreement over the party's provisional Central Executive Board candidates between Erdoğan and Davutoğlu was solved at the last minute, it was reported that Yıldırım had stopped collecting signatures for a possible leadership bid and the party's spokesperson Beşir Atalay stated that Davutoğlu would be the only candidate.

== Date and venue ==
The date of Saturday, 12 September 2015 was formally announced by the party's spokesperson Beşir Atalay on 18 August 2015. The date was chosen to coincide with the anniversary of the 1980 Turkish coup d'état. The venue was announced as the Ankara Arena. AKP congresses have usually taken place in the Autumn, with an election in November meaning that a date in mid September was seen as the most ideal.

== Agenda ==
=== Preparations ===
Due to an outbreak of violence between the Turkish Armed Forces and the Kurdistan Workers' Party (PKK) and recent casualties suffered by the Army, the congress took place in a subdued atmosphere with tough security measures. Over 40 thousand AKP supporters were expected to take part, though the actual figures stood at 12 thousand. The congress was attended by many of the AKP's founders, many of whom are no longer MPs due to the three-term limit barring them from standing for a fourth time in the June 2015 general election. An invitation was sent to former AKP Prime Minister and President Abdullah Gül, though he stated that he would not take part. Observers from the Peoples' Democratic Party (HDP), which has been accused of supporting the PKK, were not invited, while it was rumoured that the Nationalist Movement Party (MHP) would not send any observers either. Over 20 newspapers and media channels were banned from observing the congress.

=== By-law changes ===
Two proposed changes to the party's by-laws were brought before the congress. This included the lifting of the three-term limit on parliamentary candidacies for MPs who would otherwise have not been able to contest the November 2015 general election. The reasoning was that due to the short tenure of the 25th Parliament (June–November 2015), it should not be counted as a proper term towards an MP's three term allowance. As such, MPs who were elected for a third term in June 2015 would still remain on the November 2015 party lists. The by-laws also included a formation of a Founding Principles Board.

== Leadership election ==
=== Candidates ===
- Ahmet Davutoğlu, the incumbent party leader and Prime Minister of Turkey ( ✓ contesting).
- Binali Yıldırım, Special advisor to the President of Turkey and former Minister of Transport, Maritime and Communication ( ✗ withdrew).
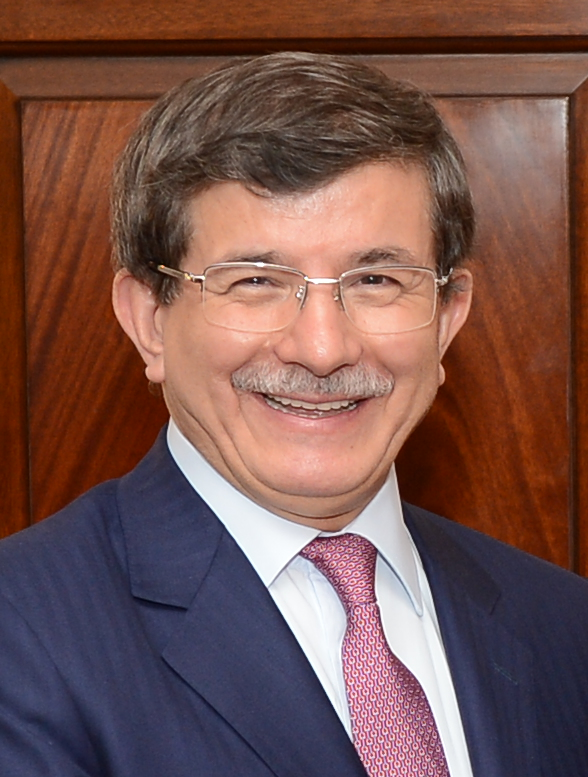
Ahmet Davutoğlu, the incumbent party leader and Prime Minister of Turkey

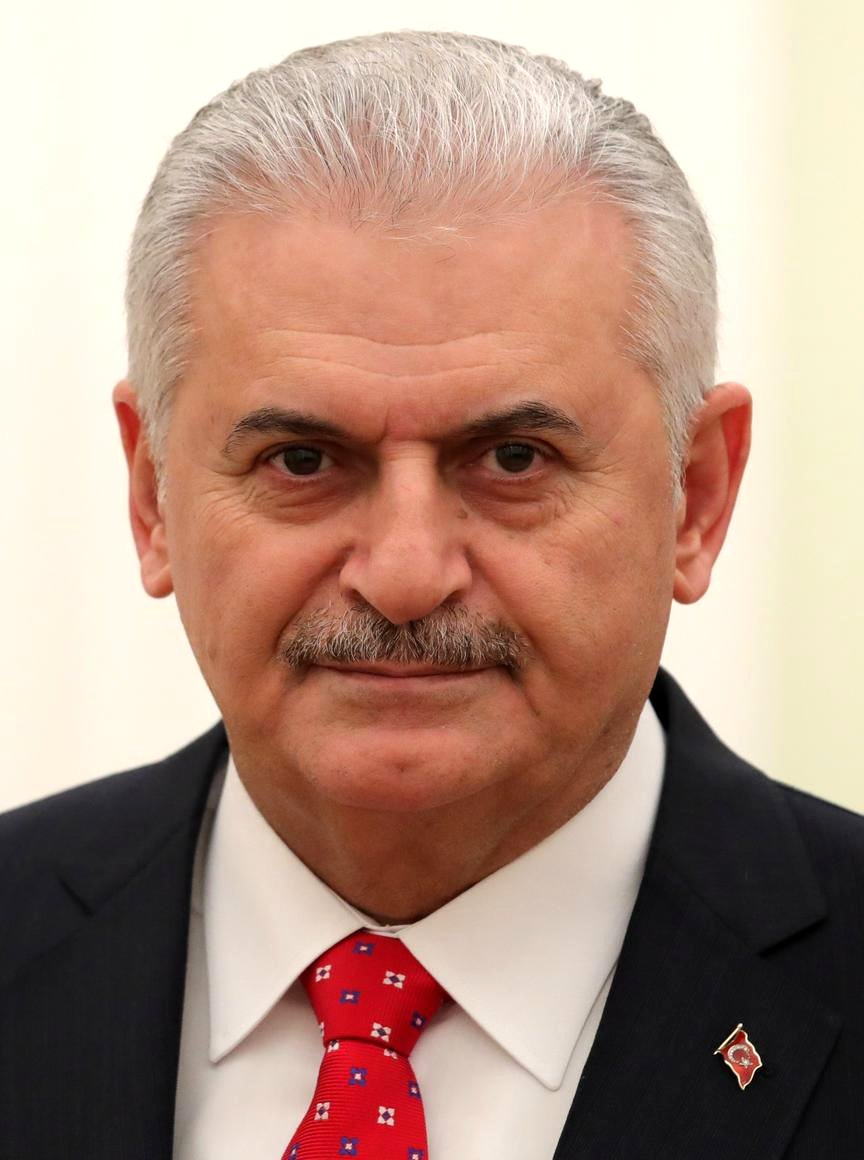
Binali Yıldırım, Special advisor to the President of Turkey and former Minister of Transport, Maritime and Communication

Ahmet Davutoğlu was expected to be the only candidate for the leadership, with all of the party's ordinary and extraordinary congresses having taken place with only a single leadership candidate. However, the AKP's poor performance at the June 2015 general election and signs of disagreement between Davutoğlu and President Recep Tayyip Erdoğan raised the prospect of Binali Yıldırım running against Davutoğlu. Yıldırım confirmed speculation that he was exploring a possible run, collecting signatures from supportive delegates. He claimed that there was a 50% chance of him running. The AKP's deputy leader Numan Kurtulmuş was unable to confirm that there was only one candidate when asked during an interview, with many commentators suggesting that Yıldırım was supported and encouraged to run by Erdoğan, to which Yıldırım serves as a special advisor.

After a disagreement over the party's provisional Central Executive Board candidates between Erdoğan and Davutoğlu was solved at the last minute, it was reported that Yıldırım had stopped collecting signatures for a possible leadership bid and the party's spokesperson Beşir Atalay stated that Davutoğlu would be the only candidate.

During the congress, only Davutoğlu declared his candidacy for the leadership.

=== Results ===
Candidate	Votes	Percentage
Ahmet Davutoğlu	1,353	100.0
Invalid/blank votes	7	–
Total	1,360	100.0
Number of delegates/turnout	1,445	94.1
Source: Hürriyet

== Central Decision Executive Board election ==
Although there was a possibility of two rival Central Decision Executive Board (MKYK) candidate lists contesting the election, a last minute resolution between Davutoğlu and Erdoğan meant that only one MKYK candidate list stood for election. The list of the MKYK candidates and the votes they received are as follows.

Candidate	Votes	Percentage	Result
Metin Doğan	1,292	99.77	✓ Elected
Zeki Aygün	1,292	99.77	✓ Elected
Mehmet Özhaseki	1,291	99.69	✓ Elected
Mehmet Erdem	1,290	99.61	✓ Elected
Recep Akdağ	1,290	99.61	✓ Elected
Naci Ağbal	1,289	99.54	✓ Elected
Galip Ensarioğlu	1,288	99.46	✓ Elected
Mevlüt Çavuşoğlu	1,288	99.46	✓ Elected
Mehmet Babaoğlu	1,287	99.38	✓ Elected
Ravza Kavakçı Kan	1,286	99.31	✓ Elected
Selçuk Özdağ	1,286	99.31	✓ Elected
Nihat Zeybekci	1,285	99.23	✓ Elected
Selçuk Öztürk	1,285	99.23	✓ Elected
Vedat Demiröz	1,285	99.23	✓ Elected
Yaşar Karayel	1,285	99.23	✓ Elected
Mehmet Ali Şahin	1,284	99.15	✓ Elected
Edibe Sözen	1,283	99.07	✓ Elected
Fatih Şahin	1,282	99.00	✓ Elected
Mehmet Müezzinoğlu	1,282	99.00	✓ Elected
Numan Kurtulmuş	1,282	99.00	✓ Elected
Faruk Çelik	1,281	99.00	✓ Elected
Ayhan Sefer Üstün	1,280	98.84	✓ Elected
Abdülhamit Gül	1,279	98.76	✓ Elected
Ali Aydınoğlu	1,279	98.76	✓ Elected
Fatma Betül Sayan Kaya	1,279	98.76	✓ Elected
Mehmet Muş	1,278	98.69	✓ Elected
Hayati Yazıcı	1,277	98.61	✓ Elected
Mehmet Doğan Kubat	1,277	98.61	✓ Elected
Ayşenur Bahçekapılı	1,276	98.53	✓ Elected
Mustafa Ataş	1,276	98.53	✓ Elected
Burhan Kuzu	1,275	98.46	✓ Elected
Bekir Bozdağ	1,274	98.38	✓ Elected
Asuman Erdoğan	1,270	98.07	✓ Elected
Mehmet Mehdi Eker	1,270	98.07	✓ Elected
Aziz Babuşçu	1,269	97.99	✓ Elected
Efkan Ala	1,267	97.84	✓ Elected
Cemil Çiçek	1,265	97.68	✓ Elected
Çiğdem Karaaslan	1,265	97.68	✓ Elected
Ömer Çelik	1,265	97.68	✓ Elected
Mustafa Şentop	1,264	97.61	✓ Elected
Öznur Çalık	1,263	97.53	✓ Elected
Alev Dedegil	1,261	97.37	✓ Elected
Hamza Dağ	1,261	97.37	✓ Elected
Nurettin Canikli	1,261	97.37	✓ Elected
Yalçın Akdoğan	1,261	97.37	✓ Elected
Nükhet Hotar	1,260	97.30	✓ Elected
Binali Yıldırım	1,259	97.22	✓ Elected
Berat Albayrak	1,257	97.07	✓ Elected
Bülent Gedikli	1,255	96.91	✓ Elected
Süleyman Soylu	1,231	95.06	✓ Elected
Total valid	1,295	100.00	50 elected
Number of delegates/turnout	1,445	89.61	50 elected
Source: HaberTürk

== See also ==
- 2014 Justice and Development Party Extraordinary Congress
