= Vision 2023 =

Political goals in Turkey

The 2023 vision was a set of goals released by the administration of Prime Minister (now President) Recep Tayyip Erdoğan in 2010 and 2011, to coincide with the centenary of the Republic of Turkey in 2023.

== Elements of the 2023 vision ==
=== Economy ===
- Become one of the top ten world economies by 2023.
- Gross domestic product of $1 trillion by 2014 (Assessment: $0.934 trillion in 2014) and of $2 trillion.
- Per capita income of $25,000.
- Increase annual Turkish exports to $500 billion.
- Foreign trade volume of $1 trillion.
- Increase the employment rate by 10 points to a working population of 30 million.
- Reduce the unemployment rate to 5 percent.
- Addition of income through applying duty on ocean trade through Straits of Bosphorus and Dardanelles.

Progress on economic goals

Policy	2009	2011	2014	2016	2018	2021	2022	2023	2023 Target
Top ten world economies (GDP)	17th	18th	16th	17th	19th	20th	19th	18th	10th
Top ten world economies (GDP PPP)	16th	15th	14th	14th	14th	14th	12th	12th	10th
Gross domestic product (GDP)	$0.651 trillion	$0.838 trillion	$0.940 trillion	$0.869 trillion	$0.798 trillion	$0.808 trillion	$0.906 trillion	$1.130 trillion	$2.00 trillion
Gross domestic product (GDP PPP)	$1.18 trillion	$1.47 trillion	$1.85 trillion	$2,07 trillion	$2.30 trillion	$2.66 trillion	$3.00 trillion	$3.28 trillion	$2.00 trillion
Per capita income (GDP)	$9,044	$11,289	$12,178	$10,964	$9,799	$9,601	$10,659	$13,244	$25,000
Per capita income (GDP PPP)	$16,423	$19,853	$24,006	$26,101	$28,299	$31,638	$35,418	$38,412	$25,000
Annual exports	$102 billion	$135 billion	$166 billion	$149 billion	$177 billion	$225 billion	$254 billion	$255 billion	$500 billion
Foreign trade volume	$0,24 trillion	$0,38 trillion	$0,42 trillion	$0,35 trillion	$0,41 trillion	$0,50 trillion	$0,62 trillion	$0,62 trillion	$1,00 trillion
Employment rate	21.3 million	24.1 million	25.9 million	27.2 million	28.7 million	28.8 million	31.2 million	34.9 million	30 million
Unemployment rate	13.1%	9.1%	9.9%	10.9%	11.0%	10.6%	10.2%	9,4%	5%

=== Energy ===
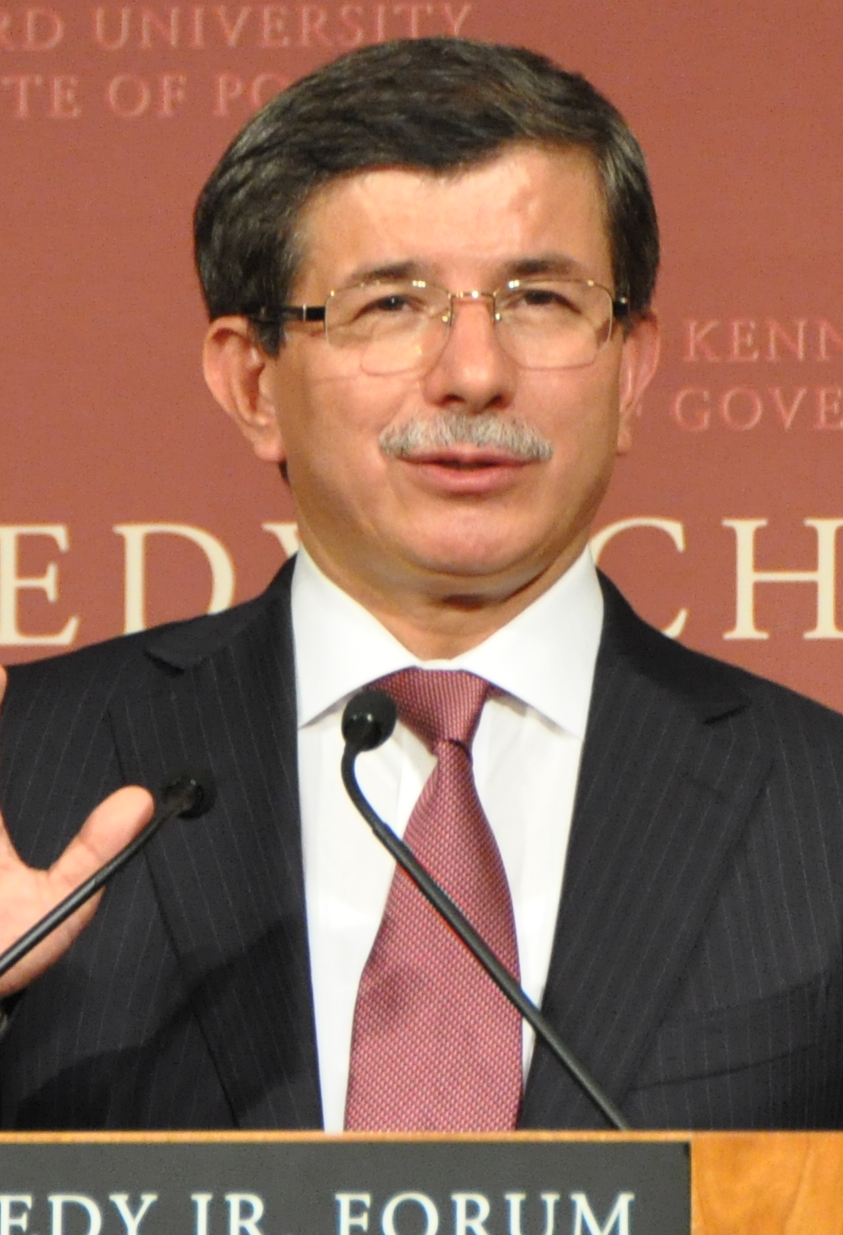
Former Turkish Prime Minister Ahmet Davutoğlu

- Build 20,000 Megawatt installed capacity of wind energy and 600 Megawatt installed capacity of geothermal energy
- Reduce energy consumption to 20 percent below 2010 levels through improved efficiency
- Three operating nuclear power plants and those plants are expected to have an installed capacity of 14,700 Megawatt.

=== Foreign policy ===
Turkey's foreign-policy objectives and vision as articulated by former Prime Minister Ahmet Davutoğlu:

First, Turkey aims to achieve all EU membership conditions and become an influential EU member state by 2023. Second, it will continue to strive for regional integration, in the form of security and economic cooperation. Third, it will seek to play an influential role in regional conflict resolution. Fourth, it will vigorously participate in all global arenas. Fifth, it will play a determining role in international organizations and become one of the top 10 largest economies in the world. To achieve them, Turkey must make progress in all directions and in every field, take an interest in every issue related to global stability, and contribute accordingly.

In 2016, President Erdoğan called for a referendum after Britain's decision on leaving the European Union.

=== Health care ===
- 100 percent participation in health insurance systems
- Raise the number of physicians per 100,000 people to 210 physicians (185 currently)

=== Transport ===
- Build 11 thousand kilometers of new railway and expand the high-speed train network
- Build 15 thousand kilometers of divided highway
- Grow ports to number among world's 10 largest
- Domestically produced airplanes, unmanned aerial vehicles and satellite

=== Tourism ===
- Be the fifth largest tourist destination
- Host 50 million visitors
- Obtain US$50 billion of tourism revenue

Progress on tourism goals

Policy	2009	2011	2014	2016	2018	2019	2021	2022	2023	2023 Target
Fifth largest tourist destination	6th	6th	6th	10th	6th	6th	3rd	4th	5th	5th
Amount of tourist visitors	27,3 million	31,3 million	36,8 million	25,3 million	45.8 million	51.2 million	29.9 million	50.5 million	55.2 million	50,0 million
Tourism revenue	$25,1 billion	$28,1 billion	$34,3 billion	$22,1 billion	$29,5 billion	$42,4 billion	$24,5 billion	$41,2 billion	49,5 billion	$50,0 billion

== Effects on the progress of 2023 vision ==
=== 2016 Turkish coup d'état attempt ===
On the summer of 2016, a coup d'état was attempted in Turkey against state institutions, including the government and President Recep Tayyip Erdoğan. The attempt was carried out by a faction within the Turkish Armed Forces that organized themselves as the Peace at Home Council. They attempted to seize control of several key places in Ankara, Istanbul, and elsewhere, but failed to do so after forces loyal to the state defeated them.

During the coup, over 300 people were killed and more than 2,100 were injured. Many government buildings, including the Turkish Parliament and the Presidential Palace, were bombed from the air. Mass arrests followed, with at least 40,000 detained, including at least 10,000 soldiers and 2,745 judges. A significant amount of tourists cancelled their trip to Turkey.

=== 2018 Turkish currency and debt crisis ===
The Turkish currency was characterized by a plunging value of the Turkish lira, high inflation, rising borrowing costs and corresponding loan defaults. In 2018, the lira's exchange rate accelerated deterioration, reaching a level of US$4.5/TRY by mid-May. Among economists, the accelerating loss of value was generally attributed to Recep Tayyip Erdoğan preventing the Central Bank of the Republic of Turkey from making the necessary interest rate adjustments. Erdogan, who claimed interest rates beyond his control to be "the mother and father of all evil", said that "the central bank can't take this independence and set aside the signals given by the president."

=== COVID-19 pandemic ===
The global COVID-19 pandemic triggered severe social and economic disruption around the world, including the largest global recession since the Great Depression. Governmental interventions, including travel restrictions and lockdowns, had a major effect on the economic and tourism goals.

=== 2022 Russian invasion of Ukraine ===
Turkey's economic policy has received significant setbacks as a result of the 2022 Russia's invasion of Ukraine, with gasoline price rising, canceled vacation bookings and textile purchases, and worries of food shortages. In the previous years, Turkey received the most tourists from Russia.
