= Peace at Home Council =

Executive body that led the 2016 Turkish coup d'état attempt

- Yurtta Sulh Konseyi
- Leader: Akın Öztürk (alleged)
- Founded: July 15, 2016 (latest possible date)
- Dissolved: July 16, 2016
- Country: Turkey
- Active regions: Ankara
- Ideology: Kemalism (claimed by the junta); Gülenism (claimed by the government)
- Status: Self-declared Government of Turkey; Alleged links with Gülen movement
- Size: 37 committee members Real size unknown

The Council for Peace at Home (Turkish: Yurtta Sulh Konseyi), alternatively called the Peace Council, claimed to be an executive body that led a coup attempt in Turkey starting on 15 July 2016 and ended on July 16, 2016. The name was made public in a statement read on air during the July 15, 2016 temporary takeover by soldiers of the headquarters of Turkish state broadcaster TRT. The group was supposedly formed within the Turkish Armed Forces clandestinely. It was declared to be the governing council of Turkey during the coup attempt. The existence of council was firstly announced by Tijen Karaş, a news anchor at the state-owned TRT news channel, allegedly at gunpoint.

The name "Peace at Home Council" is derived from 'Peace at Home, Peace in the World', which is a famous quote of Atatürk. Although it was self-declared as the successor to the incumbent 65th government of Turkey, people taking to the streets caused the coup attempt to fail, meaning that the Council took neither de facto nor de jure power in the country.

== Events ==
The formation of the council and its dismissal of the Justice and Development Party (AKP) government was announced live on the state broadcaster TRT after soldiers took over the channel's broadcasting headquarters. The stated aims of the council were "to reinstate constitutional order, human rights and freedoms, the rule of law and general security that was damaged". No set information regarding members and structure of the council were given and TRT suspended broadcasting shortly after the delivery of the statement announcing the council's creation.

== Statement and subsequent analysis ==
The statement that was read on air at TRT headquarters, said (in Turkish) that

"It is the wish and order of the Turkish Armed Forces for this statement to be broadcast on all channels of the Turkish Republic. The valuable citizens of the Turkish Republic have systematically been subject to constitutional and legal infringements threatening the basic characteristics and vital institutions of the state, while all state institutions including the Turkish Armed Forces have undergone attempts to be redesigned based on ideological motives, rendering them unfit for purpose. Fundamental rights and freedoms as well as the secular democratic legal structure based on the separation of powers have been abolished by the heedless, misguided and even treacherous president and government officials. Our state has lost its rightful international reputation and has become a country governed by an autocracy based on fear and where fundamental human rights are overlooked. The wrong decisions taken by the political elite have resulted in the failure to combat growing terrorism, which has claimed the lives of several innocent citizens and security forces who have been fighting against terror. The corruption and pilferage within the bureaucracy have reached serious levels, while the judicial system throughout the country has become unfit for purpose. In these circumstances, the Turkish Armed Forces, that founded and has guarded to this day the Turkish Republic under extraordinary sacrifices, established under the leadership of the Great Atatürk, has in order to continue the country's indivisible unity in the wake of the Peace at Home, Peace in the World ideal, to safeguard the survival of the nation and the state, to eliminate the threats our Republic's victories face, to eliminate the de facto obstructions to our justice system, to stop corruption that has become a national security threat, to allow efficient operations against all forms of terrorism, to bring forward fundamental and universal human rights to all our citizens regardless of race or ethnicity and to re-establish the constitutionally enshrined values of a secular democratic social and legal state, to regain our nation's lost international reputation and to establish stronger relations and co-operate for international peace, stability and serenity, taken over administration. The governance of the State will be undertaken by the established Peace at Home Council. The Peace at Home Council has taken every action to ensure that it fulfils the obligations set by all international institutions, including the United Nations and NATO. The government, which has lost all its legitimacy, has been dismissed from office."

=== Analysis ===
A BBC article by Ezgi Başaran said that "the statement of the junta, that was ... read on ... government TV as the coup got under way, bore a strong resemblance to Mustafa Kemal Atatürk's famous address to the Turkish Youth. [...] On the other hand, given that these references are too obvious, they may have been intentionally included to insinuate a Kemalist junta rather than a Gülenist one".

=== Staged coup allegations ===
In the aftermath of the coup attempt, commentators on social media alleged that the creation of the council had been staged to invoke greater support for the governing Justice and Development Party (AKP), with some skeptics citing the lack of any solid information on the council's actual composition as evidence that the entire ordeal had been faked by the government."

== Composition ==
No official statement regarding the composition of the council was given. According to the state-run Anadolu News Agency, subsequent investigations and allegations pointed to the leader being former Colonel Muharrem Köse, who had been dismissed earlier in 2016 from his role as legal advisor to the Chief of Staff due to his apparent links with Fethullah Gülen.

== Aftermath ==
The Peace Council was eventually unable to take power after pro-coup forces were defeated and the incumbent AKP government retained control. Mass arrests were later made, targeting over two thousand soldiers including senior officers and generals. Speculation emerged that former Turkish Air Force Commander Akın Öztürk had been in charge of the coup attempt.

== Also see ==
- Anti-Erdoğanism
