= Sare Davutoğlu =

Turkish gynaecologist (born 1961)

- Born: Sare Kundak; 1961 (age 64–65); Konya, Turkey
- Education: Istanbul University School of Medicine
- Occupation: Gynaecologist
- Spouse: Ahmet Davutoğlu (m. 1984)
- Children: 5

Sare Davutoğlu (born 1961) is a Turkish gynaecologist and the wife of the 26th prime minister of Turkey, Ahmet Davutoğlu.

== Life ==
=== Early life and education ===
Sare Davutoğlu was born in Konya in 1961. She is originally from the Kundak family of Afyonkarahisar. She graduated first in her class from Eskişehir Anatolian High School in 1980. She completed her undergraduate education at the Istanbul University School of Medicine. She specialized in gynaecology during her postgraduate studies.

=== Medical career ===
She completed her compulsory service in Kars in 1987. After her husband, Ahmet Davutoğlu, completed his doctorate, he began working as a faculty member at a university in Malaysia in June 1990. Sare Davutoğlu returned to Turkey in 1995 and completed her specialization between 1995 and 1999. Known for her opposition to abortion, Sare Davutoğlu participated in and spoke at meetings on the subject. She is a member of the Hayat Health and Social Services Foundation. She is among the principal members of the board of directors of the Association for Solidarity among Women Healthcare Professionals (KASAD-D).

== Personal life ==
She married Ahmet Davutoğlu in 1984 while continuing her education. The couple has four daughters and one son. They lost one of their daughters when she was only six days old.
