= Ahmet Davutoğlu =

Prime Minister of Turkey from 2014 to 2016

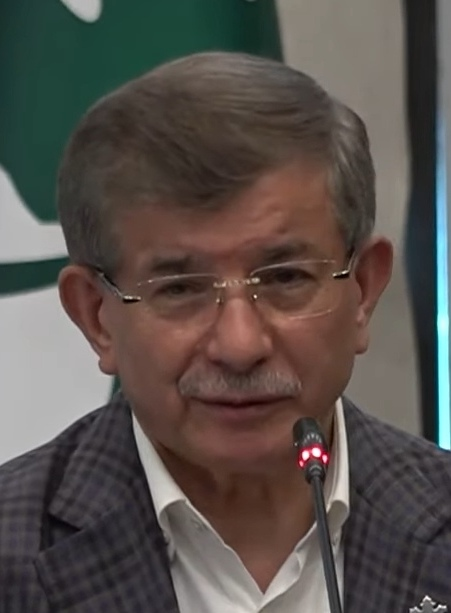
- Davutoğlu in 2022

Leader of the Future Party
- In office 19 December 2019 – 22 August 2026
- Preceded by: Party established
- Succeeded by: Party dissolved

26th Prime Minister of Turkey
- In office 28 August 2014 – 24 May 2016
- President: Recep Tayyip Erdoğan
- Deputy: Cabinet I (2014–2015): Bülent Arınç Ali Babacan Yalçın Akdoğan Numan Kurtulmuş; Cabinet II (2015): Yalçın Akdoğan Numan Kurtulmuş Cevdet Yılmaz Tuğrul Türkeş; Cabinet III (2015–2016): Yalçın Akdoğan Numan Kurtulmuş Tuğrul Türkeş Lütfi Elvan Mehmet Şimşek
- Preceded by: Recep Tayyip Erdoğan
- Succeeded by: Binali Yıldırım

Leader of the Justice and Development Party
- In office 27 August 2014 – 22 May 2016
- Preceded by: Recep Tayyip Erdoğan
- Succeeded by: Binali Yıldırım

Minister of Foreign Affairs
- In office 1 May 2009 – 29 August 2014
- Prime Minister: Recep Tayyip Erdoğan
- Preceded by: Ali Babacan
- Succeeded by: Mevlüt Çavuşoğlu

Member of the Grand National Assembly
- In office 28 June 2011 – 7 July 2018
- Constituency: Konya (2011, June 2015, Nov 2015)

Personal details
- Born: 26 February 1959 (age 67) Taşkent, Konya, Turkey
- Other political affiliations: Future Party (2019–2026); Justice and Development Party (2002–2019)
- Spouse: Sare Kundak (m. 1984)
- Children: 5
- Education: Boğaziçi University (BA, MA, PhD)

Ahmet Davutoğlu (Note: Turkish pronunciation: [ahˈmet davuˈtoːɫu]) (born 26 February 1959) is a Turkish academic, politician and former diplomat who served as the 26th Prime Minister of Turkey and Leader of the Justice and Development Party (AKP) from 2014 to 2016. He previously served as Minister of Foreign Affairs from 2009 to 2014 and chief advisor to Prime Minister Recep Tayyip Erdoğan from 2003 to 2009. He was elected as an AKP Member of Parliament for Konya in the 2011 general election and was reelected as an MP in both the June and November 2015 general elections. He resigned as prime minister on 22 May 2016.

Following the election of serving prime minister and AKP Leader Recep Tayyip Erdoğan as the 12th President of Turkey, Davutoğlu was announced by the AKP Central Executive Committee as an official candidate for the party leadership. He was unanimously elected as leader during the first AKP extraordinary congress and consequently succeeded Erdoğan as prime minister, forming the 62nd Government of the Turkish Republic. His cabinet was dominated by Erdoğan's close allies such as Yalçın Akdoğan; this led to speculation that he would take a docile approach as prime minister while Erdoğan continued to pursue his own political agenda as president. The AKP lost its parliamentary majority in the June 2015 general election, though it remained the largest party. Davutoğlu's government subsequently resigned but stayed in power until a new government could be formed. After undertaking a series of unsuccessful coalition negotiations with opposition parties, Davutoğlu was tasked with forming Turkey's first-ever interim election government, which presided over snap elections scheduled for November 2015. The AKP regained its parliamentary majority in November after a landslide victory, with Davutoğlu subsequently forming his third government.

Following a deterioration in relations between Davutoğlu and Erdoğan over their disagreements regarding parliamentary candidate lists, government policy and the implementation of an executive presidential system of government, Davutoğlu announced his resignation as AKP leader and prime minister seven months after his November 2015 general election victory. He announced that an Extraordinary party Congress would be held on 22 May 2016 and that he would not stand for re-election for the party leadership. He was succeeded as leader by Binali Yıldırım and tendered his resignation as Prime Minister soon afterward.

Davutoğlu's administration oversaw an escalation of conflict between the government and the Kurdistan Workers' Party (PKK) after a two-year ceasefire broke down in mid-2015, with his premiership being described as the 'bloodiest' in Turkey's history. His government originally authorised airstrikes against both PKK and Islamic State of Iraq and the Levant (ISIL) positions on 20 July after a suicide bombing killed 32 people in the southeastern town of Suruç. The government's offensive against ISIL suffered sustained criticism by allies such as the United States over Turkey's lack of action against the group, though the political opposition accused Davutoğlu of sparking the conflict deliberately to win back votes and regain a parliamentary majority in the November 2015 snap election. His government also presided over the ongoing political conflict with the Gülen Movement and the spillover effects of the Syrian Civil War across the border with Turkey, as well as the European migrant crisis that emerged as a result. Although his foreign policy outlook has been described as Neo-Ottoman or Pan-Islamist, Davutoğlu made Turkey's accession bid to the European Union a strategic target for his government. He has been criticised for failing to tackle political corruption and for growing government authoritarianism, with a new national security bill in early 2015 causing opposition commentators to accuse his government of turning Turkey into a police state.

In September 2019, having long been speculated to be preparing to launch his own party, Davutoğlu resigned from the AKP and accused his former party of no longer being able to provide solutions for Turkey. On 12 December 2019, he launched the Future Party (GP) and became its first leader; the party eventually became a member of the Nation Alliance, opposing AKP and Erdoğan.

== Life and early career ==
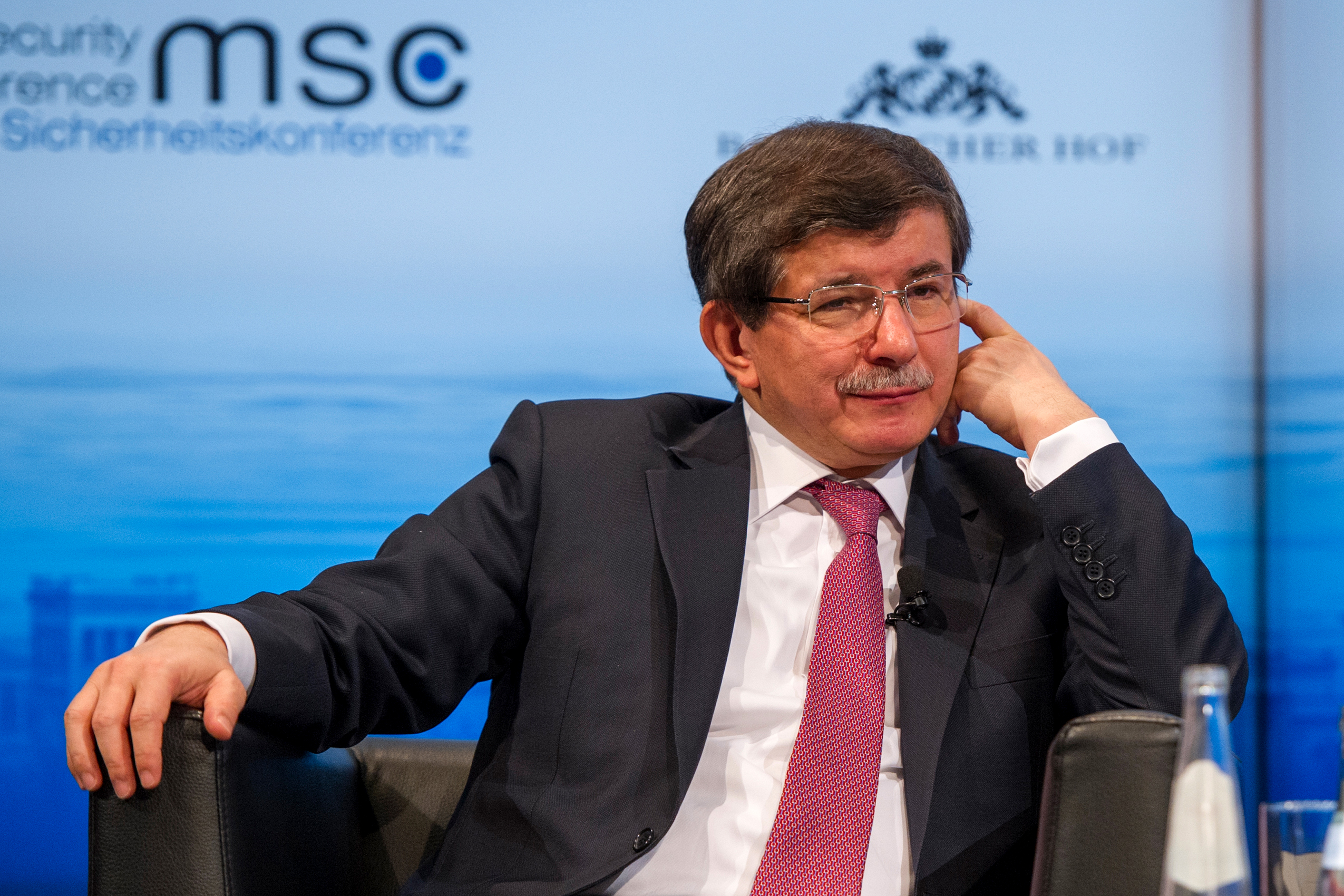
Davutoğlu at the 50th Munich Security Conference in 2014

Ahmet Davutoğlu was born in Taşkent, Konya, Turkey. He graduated from Istanbul High School, which is a Deutsche Auslandsschule (German International School) and studied at the Department of Economics and Political Science of the Boğaziçi University, Istanbul. He holds a master's degree in public administration and a PhD degree in political science and international relations from Boğaziçi University. Between 1993 and 1996 Davutoğlu taught political sciences at International Islamic University Malaysia. From 1996 to 1999 he worked at Marmara University and became a full professor in 1999. He was the chairman of the Department of International Relations at Beykent University in Istanbul. Between 1995 and 1999 he wrote weekly columns for Turkish daily newspaper Yeni Şafak.

Davutoğlu was granted the title of ambassador in 2003 by the joint decision of President Ahmet Necdet Sezer and Prime Minister Abdullah Gül.

Since 1984 he has been married to Sare Davutoğlu, who is a gynecologist working in Istanbul and a vocal anti-abortion campaigner. They have one son and four daughters. One of his daughters died at six days old.

His publications include Alternative Paradigms: The Impact of Islamic and Western Weltanschauungs on Political Theory, The Civilizational Transformation and The Muslim World in English, Stratejik Derinlik (Strategic Depth), and Küresel Bunalım (The Global Crisis) in Turkish. His book Strategic Depth is a very influential book in Turkey's foreign policy orientation, even becoming a bestseller in Greece in July 2010. He was very influential in the military, academic, and government triangle shaping Turkish foreign policy in the 2000s. In addition to his native Turkish, he also speaks German, English, Arabic and Malay.

=== Advisor to the prime minister ===
Davutoğlu became Recep Tayyip Erdoğan's chief foreign policy advisor after the latter became prime minister, developing the Justice and Development Party's new foreign policy outlook that would bring Turkey to play a larger role in the Middle East. His position as chief advisor coincided with the 2003 US-led invasion of Iraq, with Davutoğlu co-ordinating Turkish responses to ongoing military efforts in Turkey's neighbouring country. In 2007, he stated that Turkey was against the United States troops entering northern Iraq, with his opposition originating from the Kurdish separatist movements in that area.

== Foreign policy ideals ==
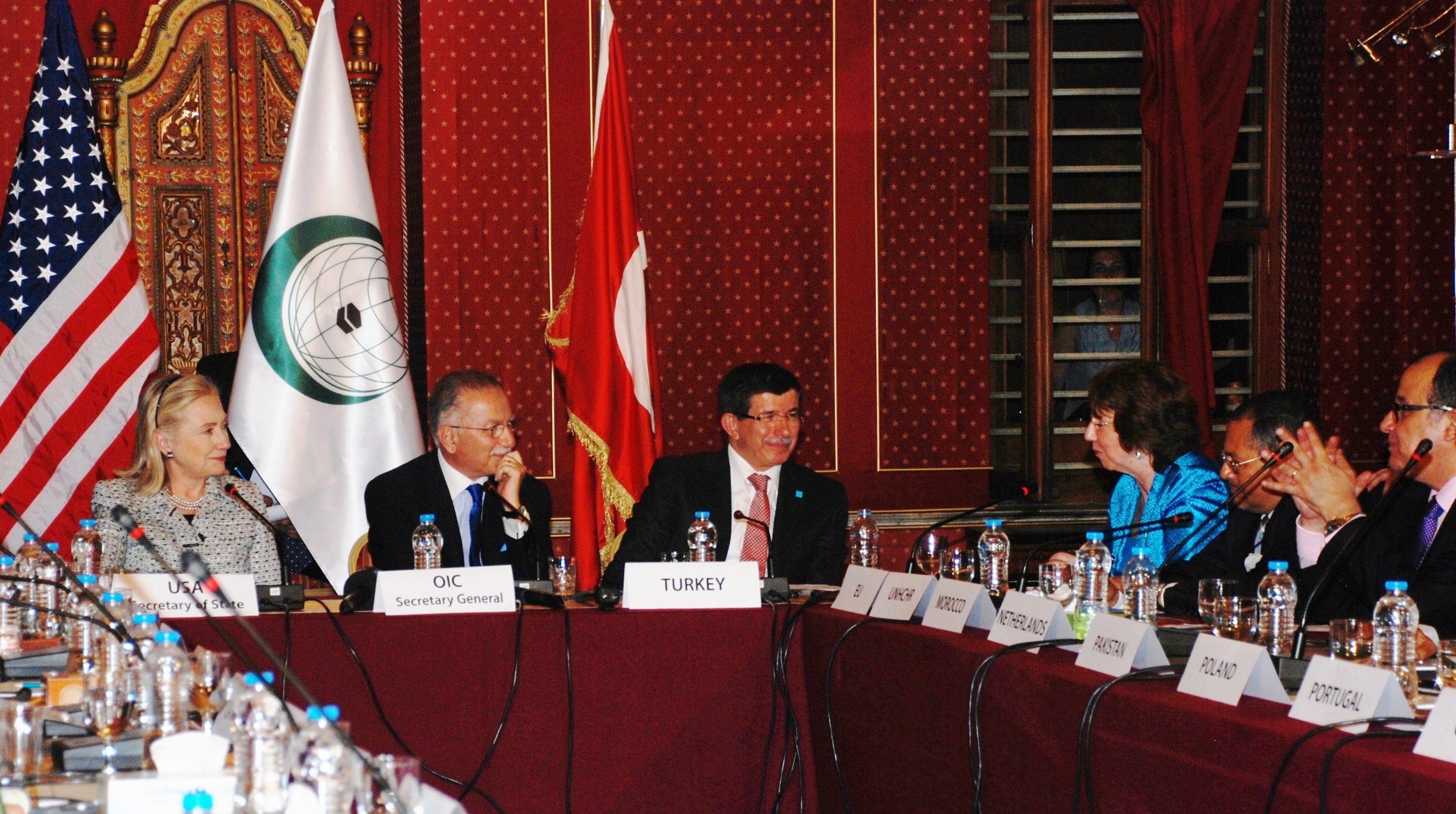
Davutoğlu (third left) at the Organisation of Islamic Co-operation Conference in 2011

From his articles for Yeni Şafak and book Stratejik Derinlik, academics and politicians have put forward the view that Davutoğlu's foreign policy vision rests on rebuilding and maintaining closer relations with former territories of the Ottoman Empire through a policy known as Neo-Ottomanism. Davutoğlu's professor and close adviser of former President Turgut Özal, Greek geopolitician Dimitri Kitsikis is considered in fact to have had a decisive influence, precisely on this geopolitical theory.

Another theory developed by Davutoğlu's former student Behlül Özkan is that Davutoğlu has a Pan-Islamist foreign policy ideal, in which he sees Islam as a unifying factor within the Middle East. Similarly, in their article, Ahmet Erdi Öztürk and Semiha Sözeri noted that Davutoğlu is the ideational father of pan-Islamic foreign policy doctrine in the contemporary Turkey. In contrast to these theories, Davutoğlu has also in the past also advocated a pro-western policy as a NATO member by expressing support for European Union membership.

=== Neo-Ottomanism ===
Davutoğlu has called for Turkey to become more than just a regional power within Europe and the Middle East and expressed a desire for Ankara to have a far more influential role in world politics. Davutoğlu is generally linked to the notion of Turkish neo-Ottomanism, which favours a commonwealth with its neighbours and old Ottoman connections. Although his foreign policies have been regarded as neo-Ottomanist by Western and especially U.S. media, Davutoğlu does not accept such a characterization. He stated in an interview with Turkish daily Sabah that "as much as we don't use this conceptualization, the fact that it is being used against us is either because of misunderstanding or lack of goodwill." He argued against the idea that Turkey is trying to establish a neo-Ottoman imperial order: "I have said that Turkey as a nation-state is equal with any other nation-state of our region whether it is small in population or area. We don't have any hegemony on anyone. Rather what we are trying to do is to contribute to the establishment of a permanent peace in our region. If by order they mean is Pax Ottomana, Pax in the meaning of order, we are trying to establish an order, it is not wrong to say such thing." In 2013, Davutoğlu spoke of developing a closer union between former Ottoman lands, though he stated that territorial claims would never rest on historical borders.

=== Pan-Islamism ===
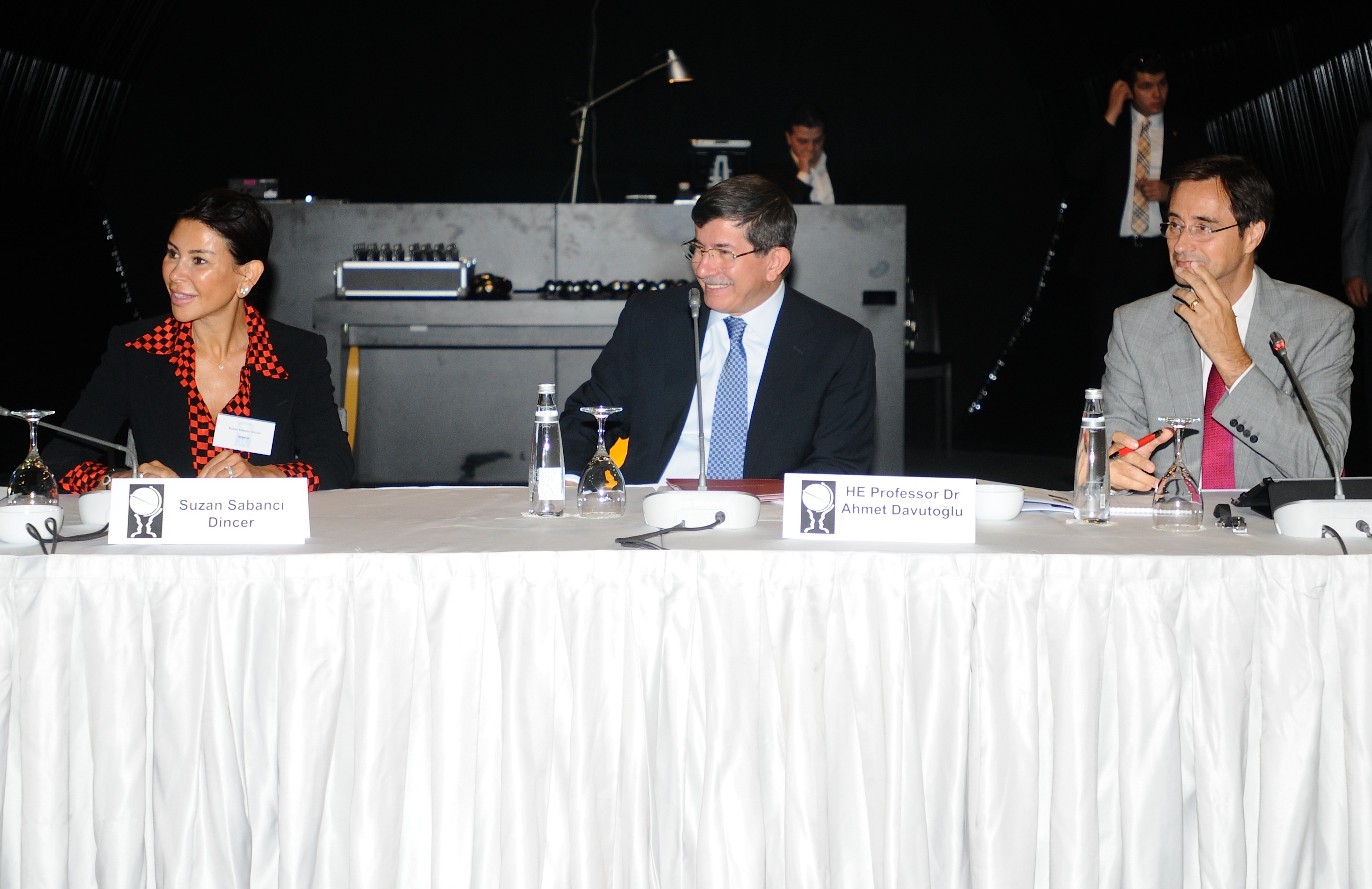
Davutoğlu (C) at the Chatham House International Roundtable, Istanbul, September 2012 with Suzan Sabancı Dinçer (L) and Dr Robin Niblett (R)

According to Behlül Özkan, who was lectured by Ahmet Davutoğlu in 1998 at Marmara University and currently serves as an assistant professor in the Department of Political Science and International Relations at the same university, Davutoğlu has pan-Islamic notions rather than neo-Ottoman. Özkan wrote an article for the "Survival", a scholarly international studies journal of the International Institute for Strategic Studies, that he had reached his conclusion by researching approximately 300 articles Davutoğlu wrote between 1990 and 2000. The notion of pan-Islamism is critical of Turkey's attempts to integrate with western nations, and advocates a union within the Middle East in order to increase regional strength and unity between peoples. Due to the several different cultures and races which inhabit the Middle East today, pan-Islamists believe that only Islam can provide a strong and long-lasting union between peoples, since they only share Islam in common. Since Davutoğlu is a Sunni Muslim, Özkan stated that Iran is not part of Davutoğlu's plans for a united Middle East.

Davutoğlu arguably observes parallel manners between Turgut Özal and Abdul Hamid II. According to Özkan, he criticizes Özal because of his pro-West notions and supports the pan-Islamic trend of Abdul Hamid II's tenure. Özkan claims that there might be a misreading in Davutoğlu's perspective: The pan-Islamic trend of Abdul Hamid II was defensive because he was struggling to protect the sovereignty of the Ottoman Empire. However, Davutoğlu can be said to have not defensive but expansionist pan-Islamic notions, as shown by his statements about the Syrian Civil War. Özkan also stated that Davutoğlu does not believe in the European Union and instead wants an Islamic Union.

=== Relations with the Muslim Brotherhood ===
Davutoğlu's foreign policy has also been referred to as Muslim Brotherhood-inspired transnationalism, for example by Republican People's Party MP Aykut Erdemir. Since the overthrow of the Muslim Brotherhood-supported President of Egypt Mohamed Morsi in 2013, Turkey has been seen as the Brotherhood's last friendly country within the region. The advocacy of Islamic democracy by the Brotherhood as well as the AKP provides a means of Davutoğlu to expand Turkey's regional influence using Islam as a common heritage that unites Middle Eastern nations together. Turkish business opportunities for Brotherhood officials, as well as alleged funding and supplies of arms have been documented and have come to light primarily after the arrest of a Turkish intelligence officer, Irshad Hoz, in Egypt. Istanbul hosted two meetings of the Muslim Brotherhood after the removal of Morsi's government from office, for which Davutoğlu faced criticism for hosting since it would damage ties with the government of Abdel Fattah el-Sisi. Qatar expelled leaders of the Muslim Brotherhood in 2014, leaving Turkey as the organisation's only major supporter. The expulsion caused speculation as to whether Davutoğlu's government would offer them asylum.

== Minister of Foreign Affairs (2009–14) ==
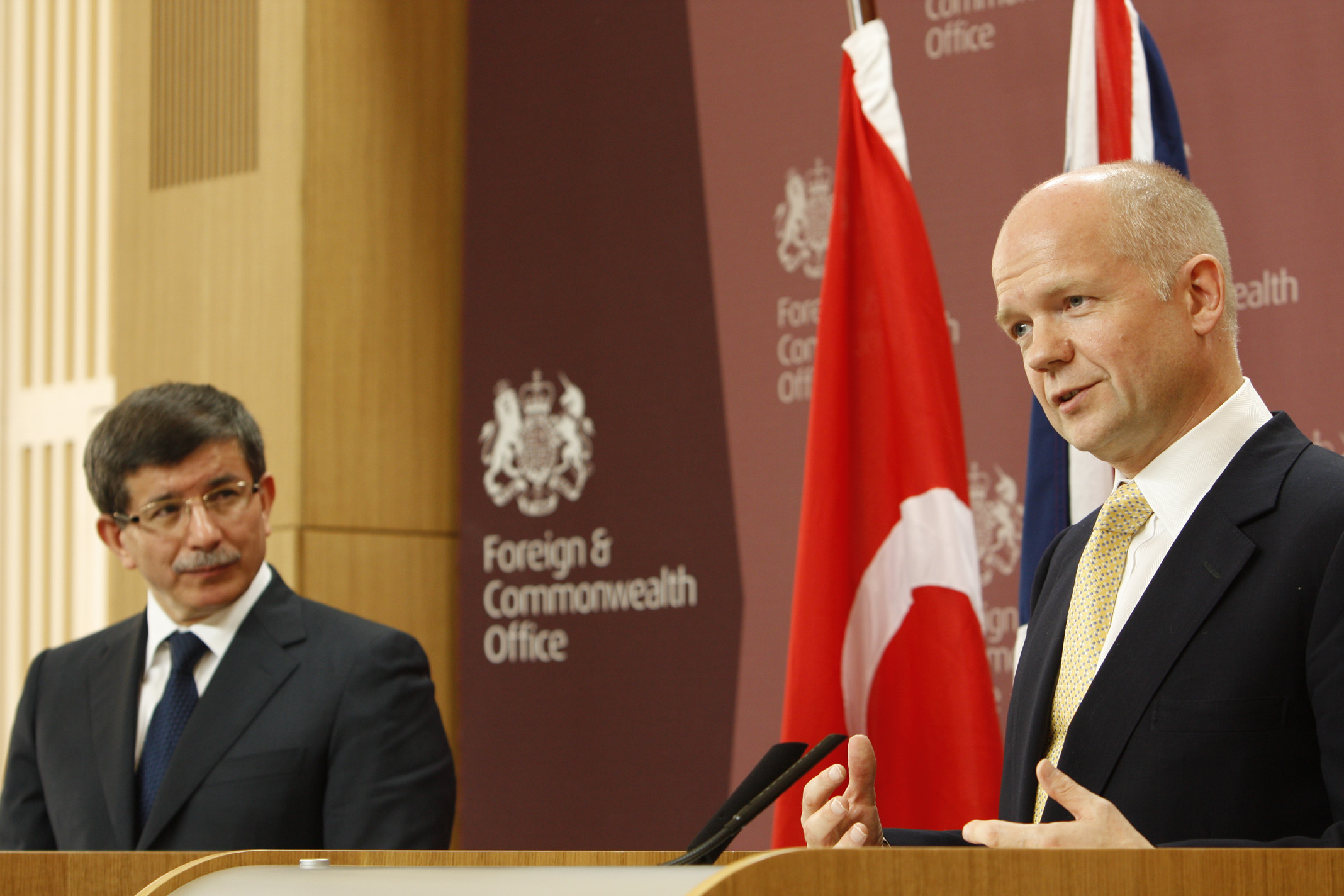
Davutoğlu with former British Foreign Secretary William Hague during a joint press conference, 2010

Davutoğlu was appointed Minister of Foreign Affairs in 2009 despite not being a member of parliament. He entered the Grand National Assembly as an MP for Konya in the 2011 general election and continued serving as foreign minister in Recep Tayyip Erdoğan's third cabinet.

He was listed in Foreign Policy magazine as one of the "Top 100 Global Thinkers of 2010" for "being the brains behind Turkey's global reawakening." In an interview, he talked about his "Zero Problems Policy" and said that "it is possible to have zero problems if the other actors respect our values. It doesn't mean that we will be silent in order to have good relations with all parties." In 2011's Foreign Policy magazine's list of "Top 100 Global Thinkers" he was listed together with Recep Tayyip Erdoğan for "imagining a new role for Turkey in the world- and making it happen.

On 30 March 2012, Davutoğlu met with Bechara Boutros al-Rahi of Lebanon and said that they should meet occasionally during this century.

In 2010, Davutoğlu set out four pillars upon which his foreign policy rests. The first is the indivisibility of security, the second is dialogue, the third is economic interdependence and the fourth is cultural harmony and mutual respect. He claimed that the goal of his policy was to integrate different nations and develop cultural understanding between different faiths and races, as well as maintaining co-operative relations and peaceful dialogue in order to solve crises when they arise.

Latter analyses of Davutoğlu term as foreign minister in 2013 and 2014 have been significantly more negative and critical. His failures are mostly associated with Turkey's policy on the Syrian Civil War, attempts to increase political influence over former Ottoman states and his controversial stance against Egyptian President Abdel Fattah el-Sisi who took power in 2014. Most criticism has been directed to Turkey's foreign policy on the Islamic State of Iraq and the Levant (ISIL) and its refusal to help Kurdish fighters take back the town of Kobani in 2014. In July 2014, an opinion poll placed support for Davutoğlu's foreign policy at 28.0, compared to a 57.7% disapproval rating. Two other polls in late 2014 show disapproval of Davutoğlu's policy on Syria to be above two-thirds of the electorate.

=== Armenia ===
On 24 April 2014, he and Tayyip Erdogan issued a statement in nine languages including Western Armenian and Eastern Armenian where they agreed that the 1915 Armenian deportations were inhumane. They also agreed that these events should be studied by both Turkish, Armenian, and foreign historians. Nevertheless, they did not recognize the Armenian genocide.

After Pope Francis has spoken that the Armenian genocide was one of the three major genocides in the 20th century, on 16 April 2015 Davutoğlu said that the Pope joined the "evil front" and the conspiracy against the Justice and Development Party.

=== Egypt ===
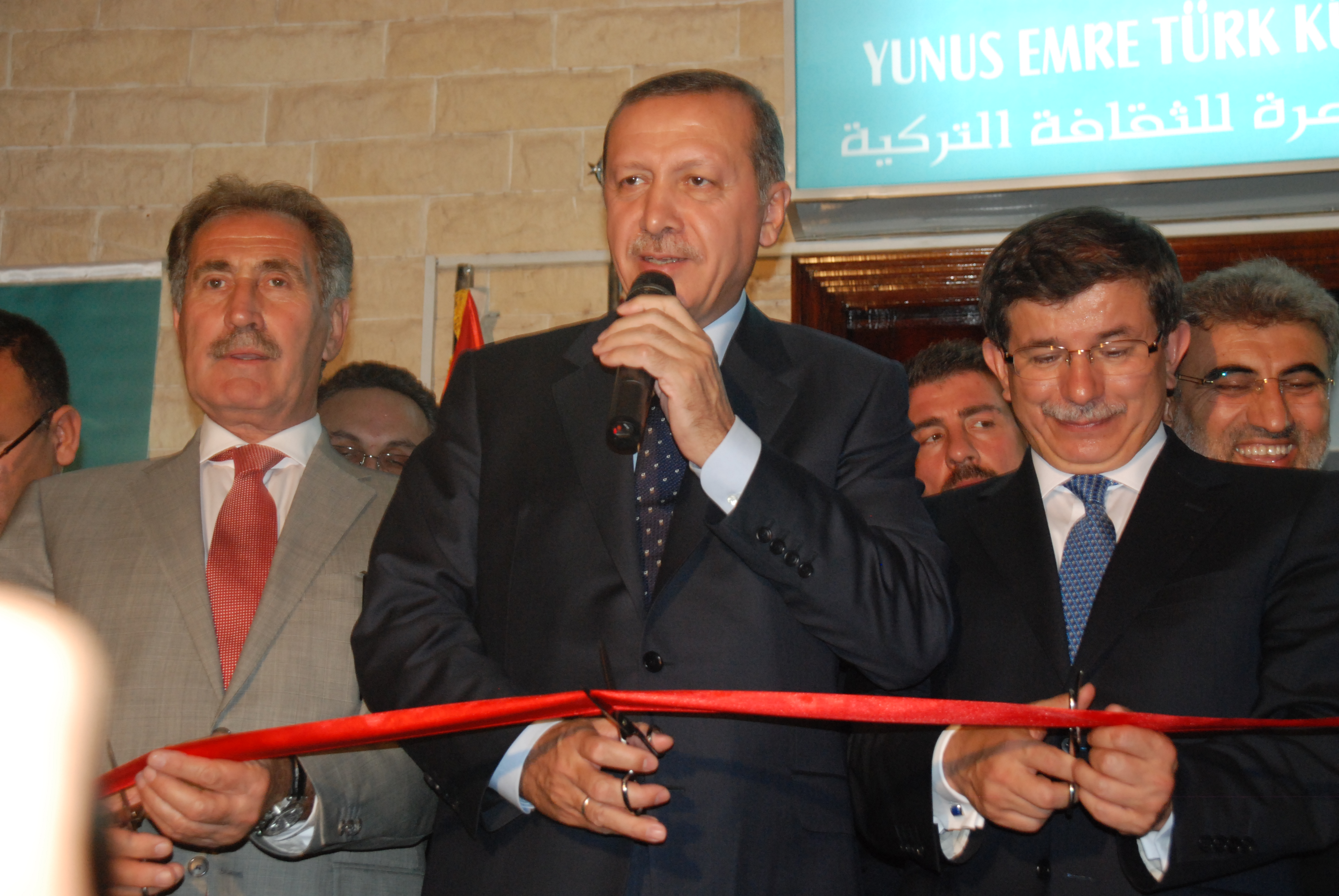
Davutoğlu alongside Erdoğan at the opening of a Yunus Emre cultural centre in Cairo, 2011

Davutoğlu presided over a significant improvement in relations with Egypt following the election of Mohamed Morsi as president in 2012, followed by a sudden deterioration shortly after the latter's removal in 2013. As one of the closest backers of the Muslim Brotherhood, Davutoğlu's relations with Morsi's government involved a Turkish offer of assistance in order to draft a secular constitution. This offer, which some viewed as an attempt by Davutoğlu to increase Turkish influence in Egypt, was rejected by Morsi's government who instead opted for a more Islamist constitution. Regardless, both Davutoğlu and Erdoğan strongly criticised the July 2013 overthrow of Morsi, and the Grand National Assembly passed a cross-party motion of condemnation.

Davutoğlu claimed that intense diplomatic traffic between Ankara and Cairo took place before the overthrow, where an eight-point plan had been agreed. However, he stated after the July 3rd incident that the first action of the new administration should be allowing Morsi to resume active participation in politics. Davutoğlu also compared Morsi's overthrow to the Turkish coups in 1960 and 1980. Davutoğlu also criticised the judicial decision to sentence 529 Muslim Brotherhood members to death, further arguing that the Egyptian government was anti-democratic and acting illegally. Relations subsequently soured, with Egypt expelling the Turkish ambassador, while Erdoğan declared the Egyptian ambassador persona non grata in retaliation. The Egyptian government also demanded an apology from the AKP for the comments, and refused to invite Turkey to an Islamic Conference held in Cairo due to the worsening relations. Following the release of Hosni Mubarak, Davutoğlu claimed that his release at a time while Morsi was still imprisoned worsened the situation that could involve into a crisis similar to that in Syria. After being ousted from Egypt, the Muslim Brotherhood had also held two conferences at Istanbul to debate the removal of Morsi and their response to it.

The AKP government's stance and President Erdoğan's remarks on Egypt have resulted in Davutoğlu's government being criticised strongly overseas, being blamed by the United Arab Emirates for 'irresponsible and blatant interference in the internal affairs' of Egypt. Critics have argued that the AKP's stance on Egypt is a threat to Davutoğlu's policy of expanding turkey's regional influence throughout the Middle East.

=== European Union ===
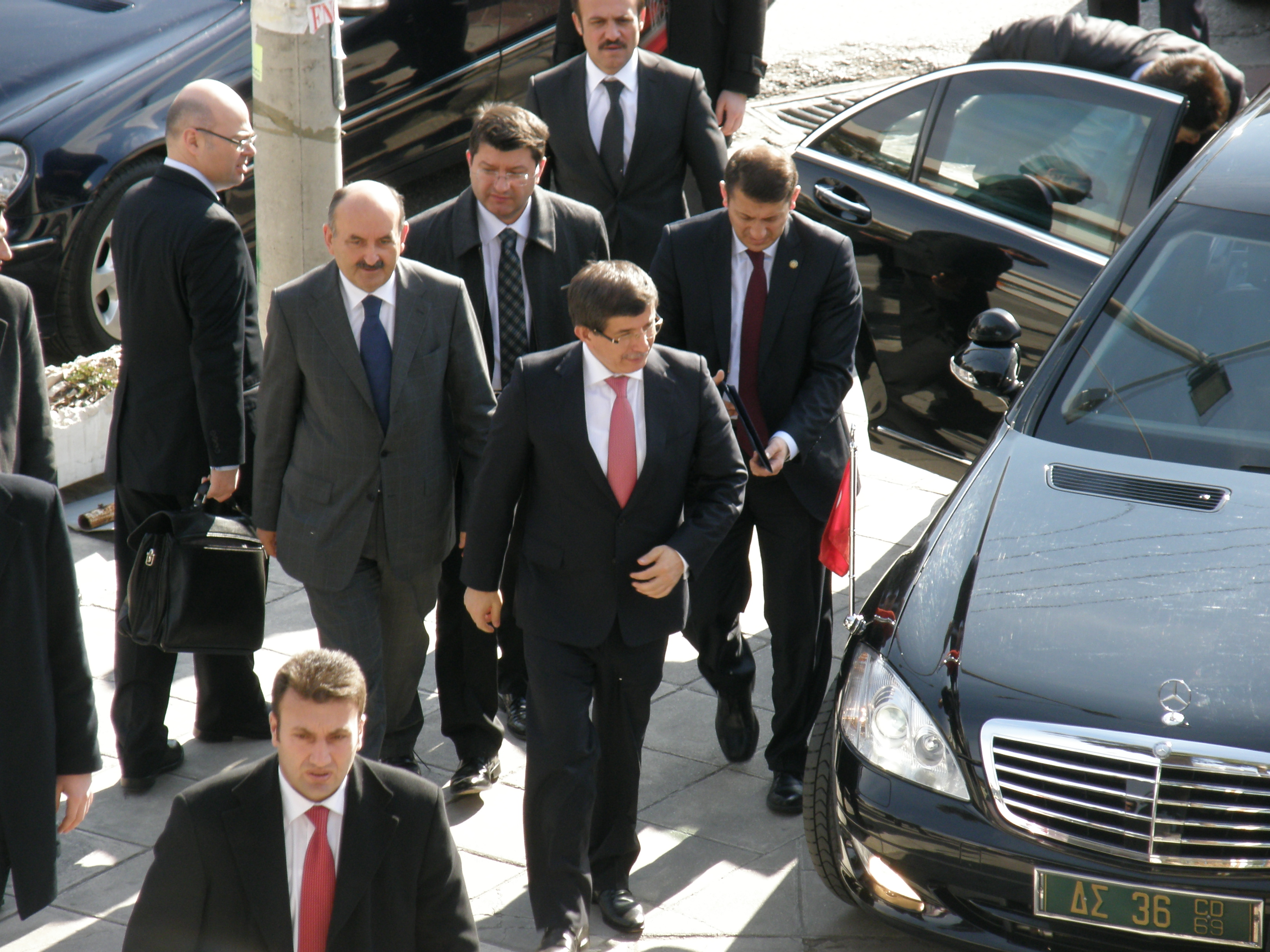
Davutoğlu visiting Western Thrace in 2011

Despite being alleged to have Pan-Islamist foreign policy ideals, Davutoğlu has voiced a degree of support for Turkey's membership of the European Union. Despite this, talks froze due to Turkey's policy on Cyprus in mid 2012 after the Republic of Cyprus assumed the rotating EU presidency, with Davutoğlu claiming that Turkey would never beg for EU membership. The bulk of Turkish-EU relations are handled by the Ministry of European Union Affairs, led by Ministers Egemen Bağış until 2013 and Mevlüt Çavuşoğlu between 2013 and 2014.

In the 51st Association Council meeting in Brussels held in May 2013, Davutoğlu claimed that Turkey had aimed for membership for 50 years and would continue to do so. He further stated that the international community needed to see Turkey as an EU member, but also said that it was unacceptable for Turkish citizens to be denied the right to free movement within Europe. With the Gezi Park protests beginning a few days later and the Turkish government facing criticism from EU leaders due to a heavy handed police crackdown on protesters, talks stalled even further.

In an article regarding Turkish foreign policy and the EU, Davutoğlu has claimed that Turkey's membership of the EU can allow it to develop stronger ties in the Balkan and Mediterranean regions and also help eliminate poverty in North Africa by using its influence in both the EU and the Islamic world. He has stated that with a multicultural identity and a diverse history, Turkey has a natural responsibility to bring about peace and stability within the world. Since Turkey already has close economic and diplomatic relations with EU member states, Davutoğlu has emphasised that full EU membership would benefit both Turkey and all other member states with added security and trade. Furthermore, Davutoğlu has also advocated that a united Europe with Turkey as a member would be fit to fight terrorism and other threats to democracy and human rights. Despite this, he has criticised the political obstacles in the path of Turkey's ascension which are in "stark contrast" with negotiation terms.

=== Greece and Cyprus ===
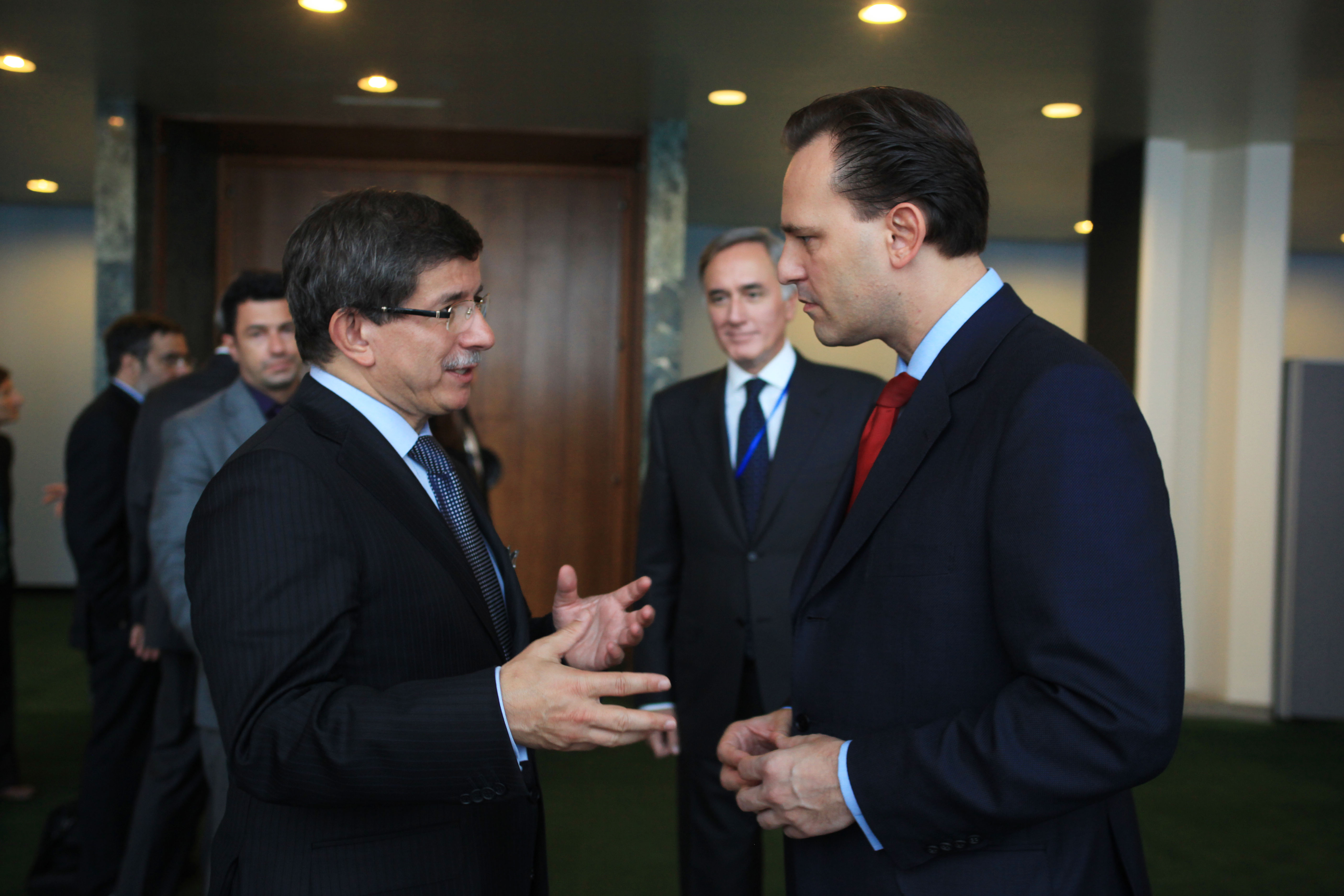
Davutoğlu meets with former Greek Foreign Minister Dimitrios Droutsas

In June 2012, Davutoğlu accused the Greek government of not respecting the rights of Turkish minorities, especially in Western Thrace. He further stressed that the alleged withdrawal of Greek citizenships from Turkish minority citizens was against the Treaty of Lausanne.

In 2013, Davutoğlu brought a possible two-state solution of the Cyprus dispute to Greek Foreign Minister Dimitris Avramopoulos after controversy erupted over the ownership of offshore oil reserves. The prospect was swiftly disregarded by the Greek foreign ministry. Davutoğlu also claimed that negotiations to resolve the dispute would accelerate under the leadership of Nikos Anastasiadis, who had supported the Annan Plan and had voted yes in the 2004 Annan Plan referendum. This, according to Davutoğlu, was in stark contrast to former Republic of Cyprus President Demetris Christofias, who had voted against. Davutoğlu has also expressed that any new possible solution does not need to be based on the Annan Plan.

On the issue of turning Hagia Sophia into a mosque, Davutoğlu has stated that all international laws on such issues would be obeyed. He has also called the Greek government to respect the religious freedoms of Muslims within Greece, which he alleged to be under threat from legislation such as the "240 Imam Act." He claimed that the Greek government should refrain from interfering in religious affairs.

In May 2014, Davutoğlu stated that Turkey would not pay compensation of €90 million to the Republic of Cyprus for the damages dating back to the 1974 Cyprus invasion despite a ruling by the European Court of Human Rights (ECHR). In a statement, Davutoğlu claimed that the Foreign Ministry saw no need to obey a court ruling which was directed at an entity not recognised by the Republic of Turkey. He also criticised the ECHR ruling, and claimed that it contained errors and inconsistencies. Adding that obeying the ruling was impractical, Davutoğlu stated that the ruling of the court was a substantial blow against achieving a resolution to the Cyprus Dispute. The government of the Turkish Republic of Northern Cyprus supported Davutoğlu's position, arguing that the court ruling was simply made to please Greece and Greek Cypriots.

=== Iran ===
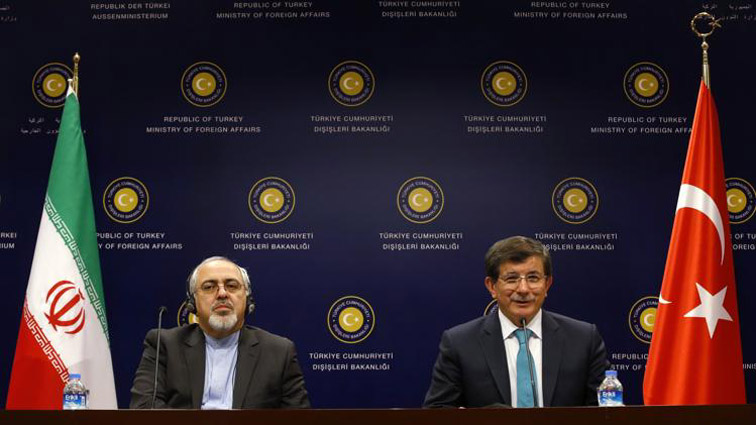
Davutoğlu with Iranian Foreign Minister Mohammad Javad Zarif in Ankara

As the foreign minister of a Turkey, Davutoğlu has voiced concerns over Iran's nuclear program. Regardless, his foreign policy has been to develop relations with Iran, since Iran is Turkey's second biggest supplier of oil after Russia. In contrast to Turkey's western allies, Davutoğlu stated that there was no plan to place an embargo on Iranian oil, and claimed that sanctions against Iran had also damaged Turkey. Davutoğlu has stated that his vision for Turkey is for the country to become an "energy corridor" for eastern oil. His stance has been at odds with other cabinet ministers such as Energy minister Taner Yıldız, who sought to buy more oil from Libya in order to comply with United Nations sanctions against Iran.

After a temporary deal on Iran's nuclear programme was reached in Geneva, Davutoğlu congratulated Iranian Foreign Minister Mohammad Javad Zarif on the achievement and stated that the withdrawal of sanctions would benefit both Turkey and Iran. He further stated that Turkey would not want to see the spread of nuclear arms throughout the region.

Friction developed between the two countries after Turkey decided to host a NATO missile defence system against Bashar al-Assad's Syrian forces in 2012. As a supporter of Assad's regime, Iran's foreign policy has been at odds with Davutoğlu's criticism of Assad. Relations in regards to Syria improved in 2013, with Davutoğlu and Iranian Foreign Minister Mohammad Javad Zarif jointly calling for a ceasefire ahead of the January 2014 Geneva peace talks. In late 2013, Davutoğlu stated that both Turkey and Iran were united for regional stability.

=== Iraq and ISIL ===
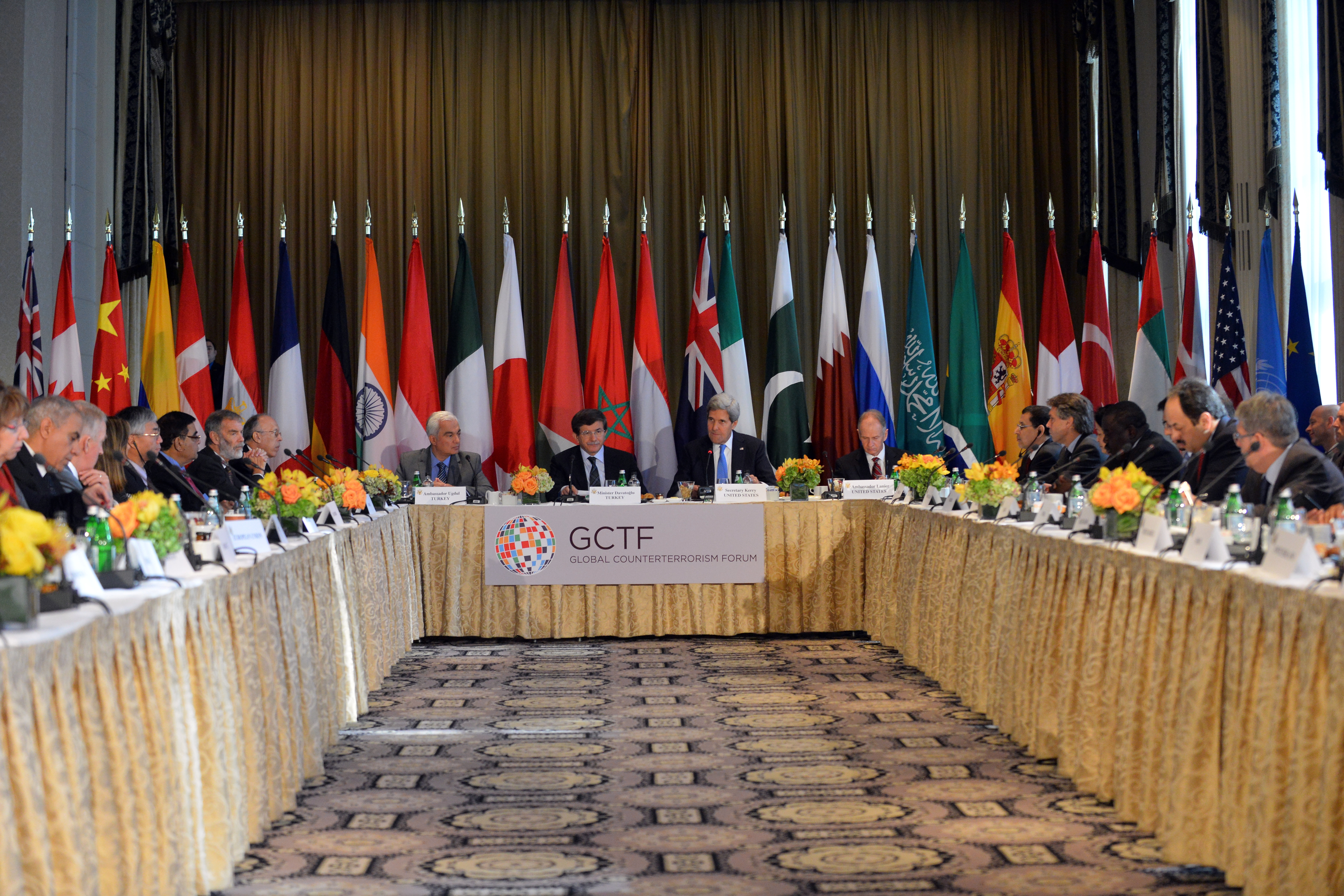
Ahmet Davutoğlu with John Kerry and other Foreign Ministers at the Global Counter Terrorism Forum

Davutoğlu has claimed that the Turkish policy against the Islamic State (IS) has been to try and prevent sectarian violence at all costs by reaching out to both Sunni and Shi'ite communities. In August 2014, Davutoğlu stated that he held Prime Minister Nouri Al-Maliki as responsible for the escalating violence within Iraq, and criticised his refusal to step down. After security forces surrounded Iraqi President Fouad Masoum's presidential palace on 10 August, Davutoğlu claimed that he had "worked all night" to avert any coup attempts and issued a statement of support for President Masoum. Davutoğlu has also voiced concern on the impact that the growing unrest has had on Iraq's Turkmen and Yazidi minorities.

Davutoğlu's policy on IS has drawn fierce criticism and concern from both the Turkish political opposition and the international community for inactivity, incorrect speculation and even alleged funding. In a statement on 7 August 2014, Davutoğlu responded to these claims by stating that "anyone who claims that IS receives support from Turkey is treacherous." Several news agencies reported that the statement had defended ISIS against accusations of terrorism and had blamed Syria and Iraq for the violence instead. Davutoğlu also stated that Turkey is the biggest contributor of humanitarian aid in Iraq. In early 2014, Turkey had destroyed an ISIS convoy in an attempt to respond to their growing influence in Syria.

=== Iraqi Kurdish Regional Government ===
Relations between Turkey and the Kurdistan Regional Government (KRG) in northern Iraq strengthened with the ceasefire with PKK rebels. In 2014, Davutoğlu visited northern Iraq and met regional President Massoud Barzani multiple times, stating that Turkey sought closer ties with the KRG in terms of diplomatic relations as well as oil trade. He further stated that no hostilities remained between Turkey and the KRG due to the PKK ceasefire. Talks between Barzani also involved the ISIS related developments in Iraq.

=== Israel and Gaza ===
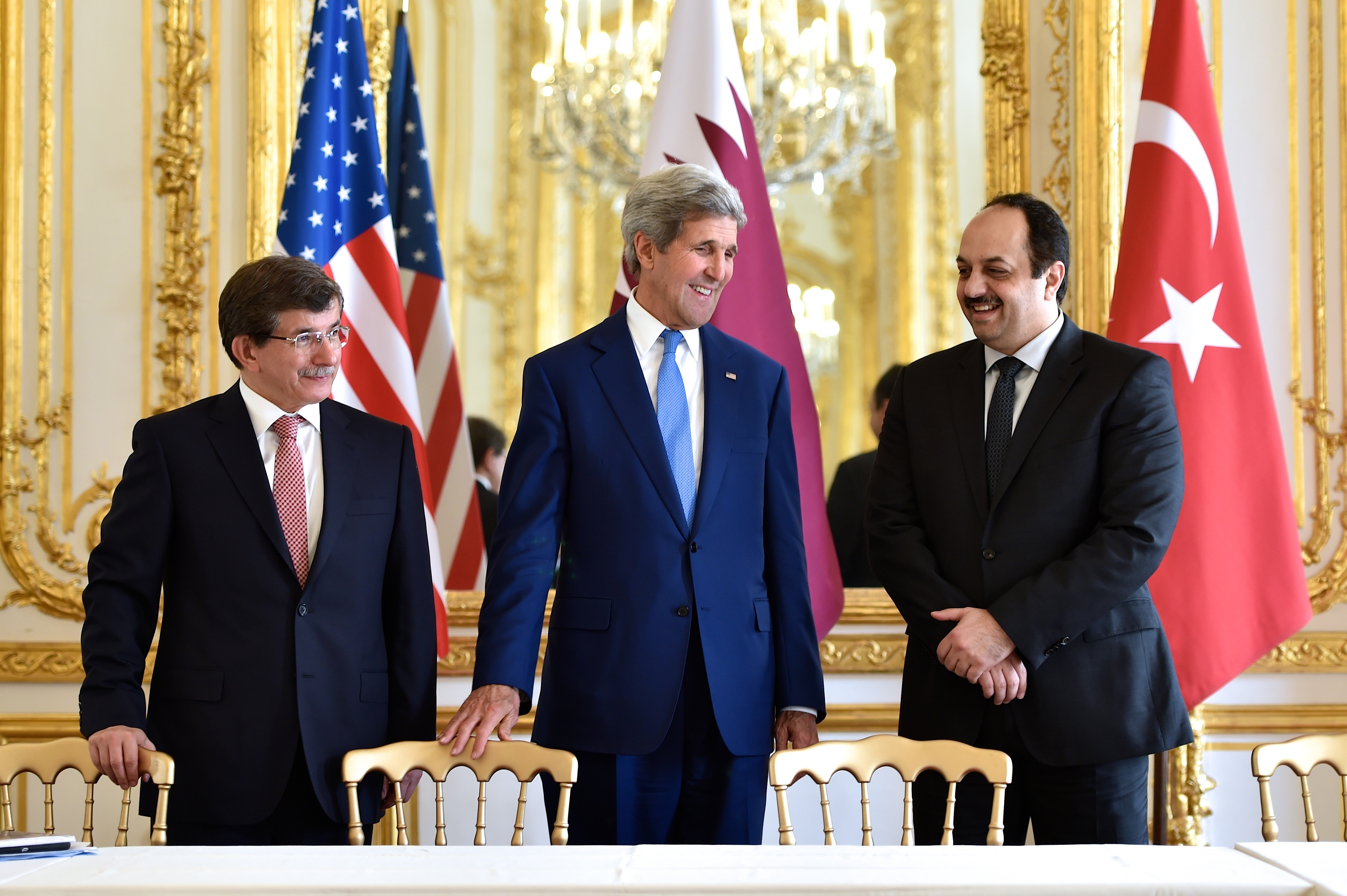
Davutoğlu (left) with US Secretary of State John Kerry (centre) and Qatari Foreign Minister Khalid al-Attiyah (right) discussing Israel-Hamas ceasefire deal (Paris, 2014)

Before becoming foreign minister, Davutoğlu was one of the leading actors on behalf of the Turkish government during the shuttle diplomacy for the settlement of 2008 Israel–Gaza conflict.

Following the Mavi Marmara incident in May 2010, Davutoğlu put forward three conditions for the normalisation of relations between Turkey and Israel. He stated that the State of Israel should issue an apology for the incident and pay compensation, and also lift the naval blockade of the Gaza Strip. Davutoğlu managed to secure an apology in March 2013, and compensation deals were finalised in 2014. He further stated that the political unrest in Egypt had delayed the lifting of the naval blockade. In February 2014, Davutoğlu stated that Turkish-Israeli relations were closer to normalisation than ever, and that the strengthening of Palestine will help increase the influence of Turkey in the Middle East. His remarks were criticised by lawyers for allegedly interfering with the cases against the Israeli soldiers who were involved in the Mavi Marmara incident.

At an Ankara conference in May 2014, Davutoğlu stated that the Israeli occupation of Jerusalem caused suffering to citizens, and that it was a moral obligation to protect the city's culture and Islamic identity.

With Prime Minister Recep Tayyip Erdoğan taking a strong anti-Israel stance during the 2014 Israel-Gaza conflict, Davutoğlu pursued a policy of active participation, providing humanitarian assistance to Gaza. Relations between Turkey and Israel deteriorated significantly, with Israel withdrawing diplomatic staff from Turkey due to safety fears, just a few months after announcing that staff numbers would increase back to normal levels. On 26 July, Davutoğlu met with United States Secretary of State John Kerry and Qatari Foreign Minister Khalid bin Mohammad Al Attiyah in Paris in an unsuccessful attempt to draft a ceasefire deal between Israel and Hamas.

Following the January 2015 Île-de-France attacks, Davutoğlu likened Israeli Prime Minister Benjamin Netanyahu to the perpetrators, stating that both had committed crimes against humanity. He stated that Israel's military operations in Gaza and its 2010 assault on a Turkish-led aid convoy were comparable to the terror attacks in France. These remarks followed statements in which Davutoğlu said the Turkish government would not yield to foreign interest groups, including the "Jewish lobby", or to the "parallel structure", a term used by Turkish leadership to refer to followers of Fethullah Gülen. The comments came shortly after Turkish President Recep Tayyip Erdoğan accused the Gülen movement of collaborating with Mossad to undermine the government.

=== Libyan Civil War ===
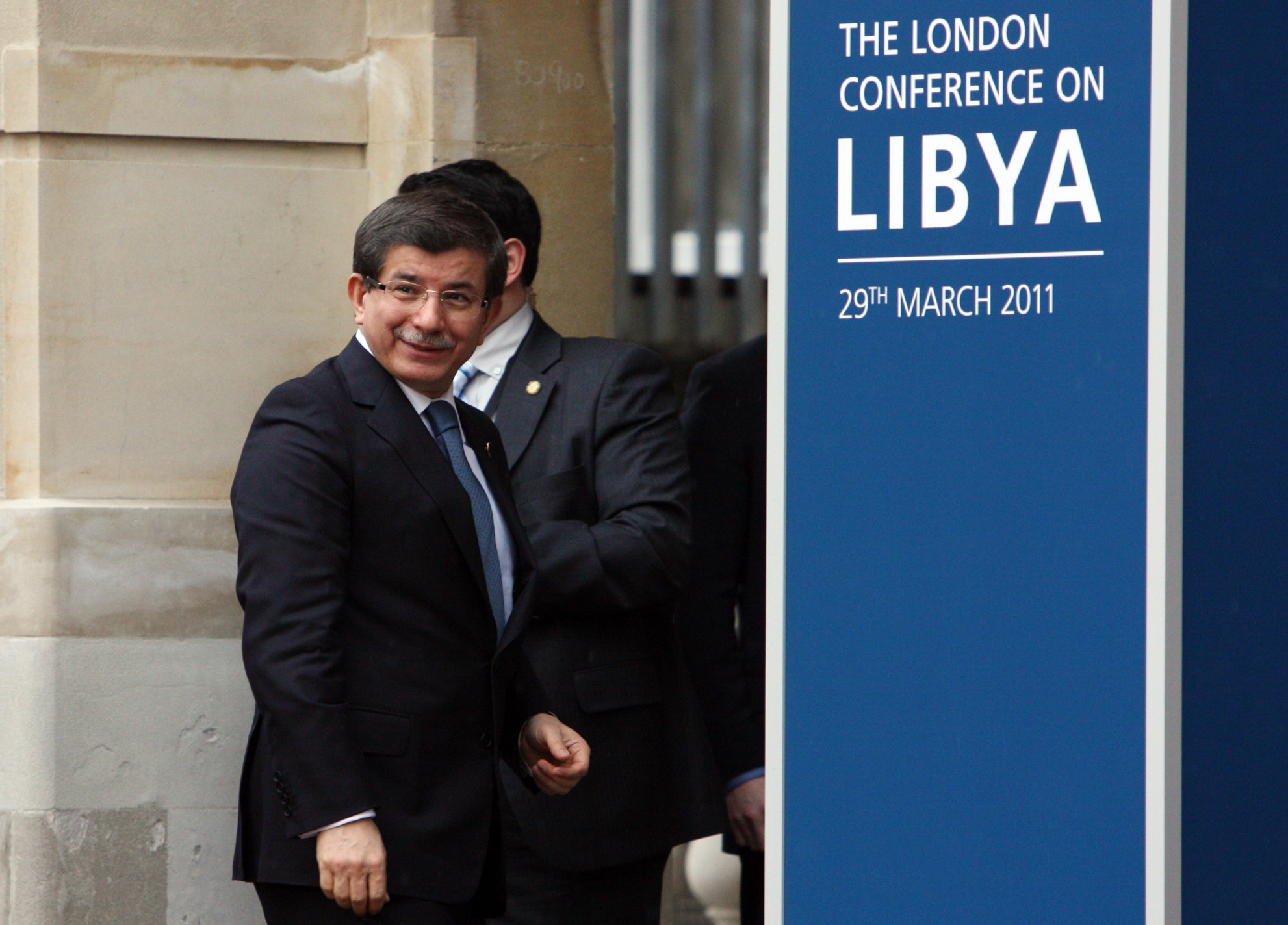
Davutoğlu at the London Conference on Libya, March 2011

Davutoğlu took a humanitarian approach in an attempt to end the suffering of Libyan civilians during the Civil War. In a 2011 conference on Libya, Davutoğlu stated that ending civilian suffering should be a greater priority than toppling Muammar Gaddafi from power, stating that NATO should play a more active role in pressuring Gaddafi to respect the rights of Libyan citizens. However, he warned against full military intervention, stating that the situation should not turn into a war effort similar to those in Iraq or Afghanistan. In April, Davutoğlu stated that the Turkish government had cut its diplomatic ties with Gaddafi's regime and instead recognised the National Transitional Council as the legitimate government of Libya and pledged greater financial aid to the rebels. In May 2011, Davutoğlu met with rebel leaders and voiced concerns on the threats to civilians, arguing that a peaceful transition of power could be achieved if Gaddafi and his family stepped aside.

=== Russia and Crimea ===
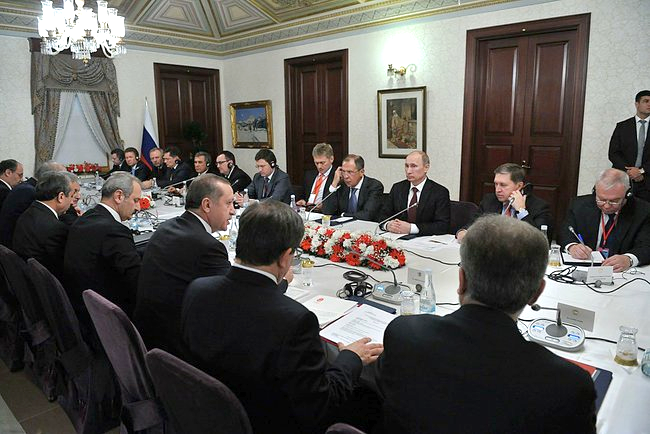
Davutoğlu at the annual meeting of the Turkish-Russian High-Level Co-operation Council in 2012

Before becoming foreign minister, Davutoğlu stated that Turkey would not pay the price of either Russian or Georgian strategic failures during the Russo-Georgian War in 2008. Upon being asked whether Turkey would have to make a choice between either country, he stated that as a member of NATO and an EU candidate country, Turkey had already made its choice. However, he also emphasised that Turkey did not have the luxury of isolating Russia.

While Turkey has overall maintained good relations with Russia, Davutoğlu has been influential in maintaining ties between the two countries which held differing views during the annexation of Crimea and the Syrian Civil War. Relations with Russia are also economically significant due to Turkish imports of natural gas. The two countries launched the High-Level Cooperation Council in 2010 which meets annually to review relations. The Joint Strategic Planning Group Meeting Protocol, which formed a part of the Co-operation Council, was signed in 2011. When the Turkish AKP government fell out with Fethullah Gülen in late 2013, Davutoğlu was able to find further common ground with Russia, which viewed Gülen and his Cemaat movement extremely negatively.

Economic relations improved with a Russian offer for Turkey to participate in the South Stream gas pipeline project, which will run through Turkish waters. Davutoğlu has stated that Turkey is eager to enhance economic co-operation with Russia. The issues of Syria and Crimea were discussed during a Joint Strategic Planning Group Meeting in May 2014. A new project to establish a joint investment bank between the two countries in order to fund joint projects and improve economic relations through the use of local currencies was also likely discussed. The bank would also serve to address the lack of financial resources which have placed the two nations' ongoing joint investments at risk.

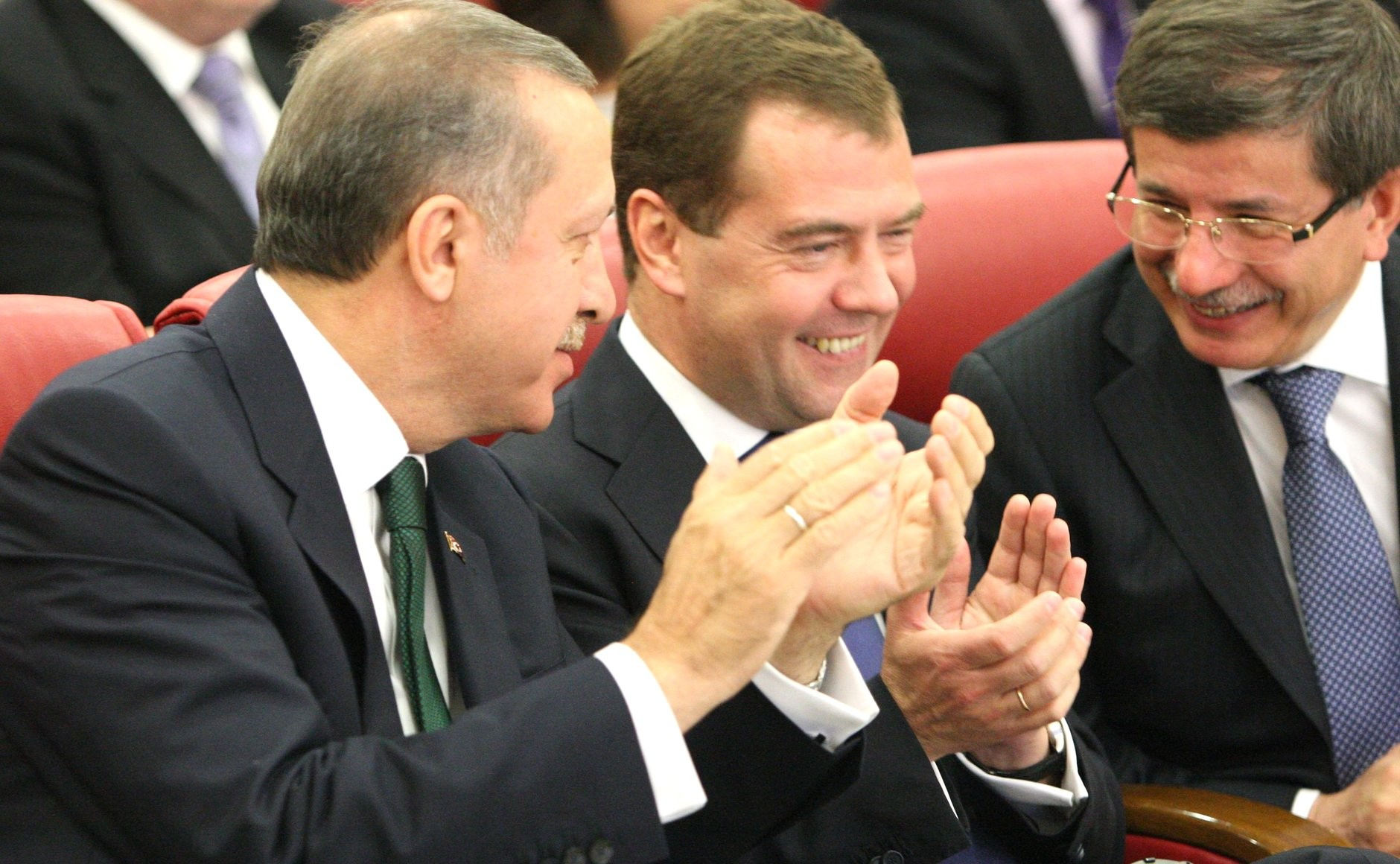
Davutoğlu and Erdoğan with Russian President Dmitry Medvedev in 2010

With Turkey taking a pro-opposition stance throughout the Syrian Civil War in contrast to Russia's support of Bashar al-Assad, Davutoğlu has been at odds with Russian Foreign Minister Sergei Lavrov. Despite this, Davutoğlu has stated that actions taken by Turkey against Syria, such as the forcing the landing of a Syrian jet in 2012, would not damage relations. In 2013, the two sides still failed to agree on the fate of Syria, yet both emphasised that they would formulate a strategic plan to bring peace and stability throughout the region. Davutoğlu also supported Russia's call for Syria to hand over its chemical weapons instead of risking foreign military intervention. In May 2014, he raised concerns regarding the Syrian presidential election with Russia. Davutoğlu has supported the need for a peaceful resolution to the Russo-Ukrainian war through diplomatic negotiations, and has raised concern over the treatments of Crimean Tatars by Russian armed forces. He also called for the Russians to lift the ban on Crimean Tatar leader and Ukrainian Member of Parliament Mustafa Dzhemilev's entrance to Crimea, the respect for international law and the union of Ukraine. Davutoğlu has stated that Turkey would not recognise the result of the status referendum in Crimea. In March 2014, Davutoğlu accepted nearly 50 representatives from various Crimea charities from throughout Turkey, as well as from the Crimean Tatar Charity Federation. He stated that Crimean Tatars were going through a "test," in which everything must be done to insure that they are able to return to their "homeland." He stated that Turkey would always side with Turkish Crimeans in any situation. He later also claimed that the future of Turkish Crimeans was the most important problem for the country and that the Ministry of Foreign Affairs was doing all it could to prevent the situation from destabilising any further. Earlier in February, he claimed that all problems could be solved if Crimea remained within Ukraine.

=== Somalia ===
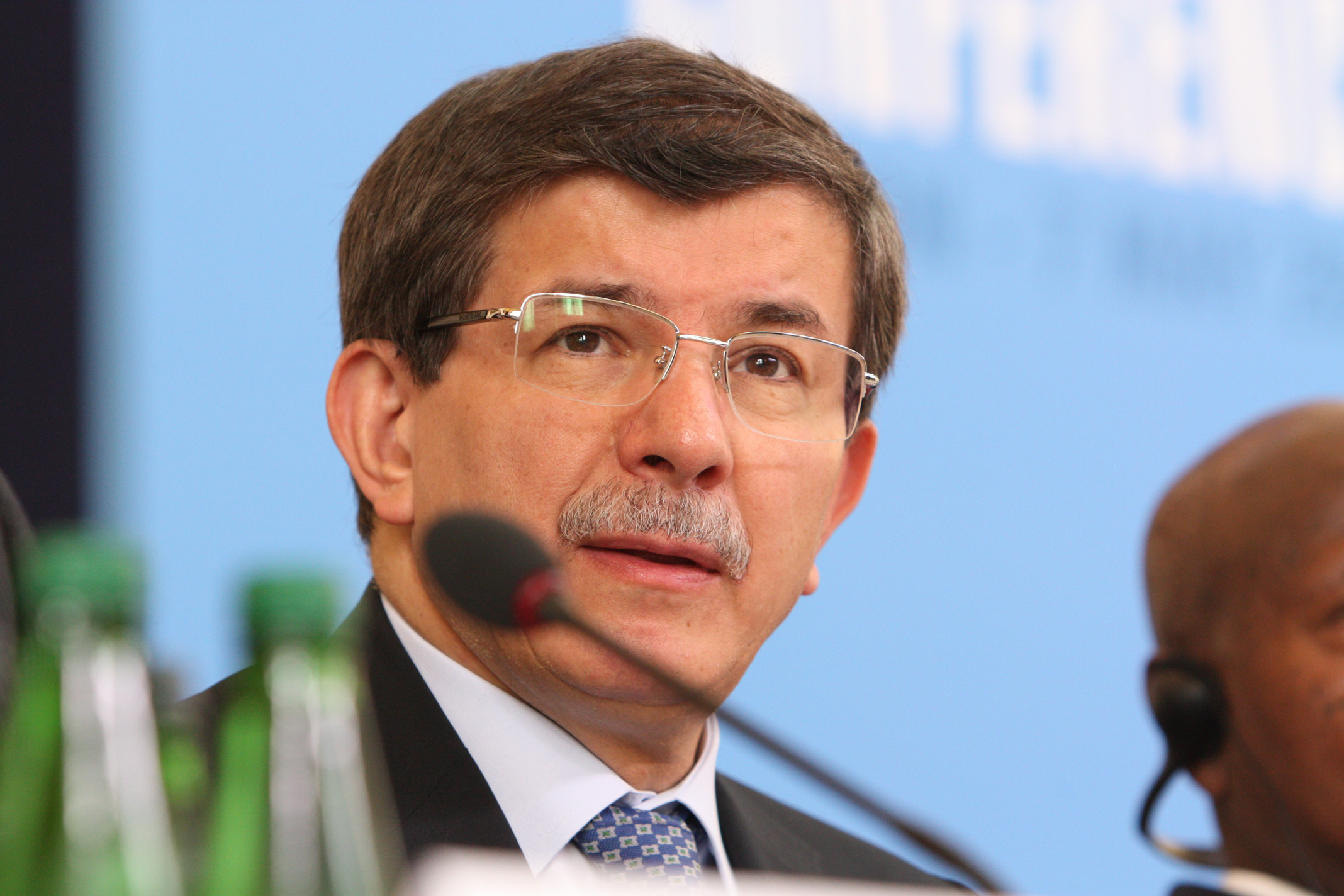
Davutoğlu at the London conference on Somalia in 2013

Davutoğlu has played a leading role in the Turkish government's close bilateral ties with the Federal Government of Somalia. Following a greatly improved security situation in Mogadishu in mid-2011, the Turkish government re-opened its foreign embassy with the intention of more effectively assisting in the post-conflict development process. It was among the first foreign administrations to resume formal diplomatic relations with Somalia after the civil war. Davutoğlu further encouraged other nations to follow suit and re-open their own embassies in the country, welcoming in that regard the new British embassy in Mogadishu.

Development cooperation between Turkey and Somalia is multi-tiered, and includes military, social, economic and infrastructural partnerships. In May 2010, the Turkish and Somali governments signed a military training agreement, in keeping with the provisions outlined in the Djibouti Peace Process. Enforcement of the pact officially began in November 2012.

Following the establishment of the Federal Government of Somalia in 2012 and the election of Hassan Sheikh Mohamud as president, the Turkish authorities re-affirmed Turkey's continued support for Somalia's government, its territorial integrity and sovereignty. In May 2013, Davutoğlu was also among the participants at the Somalia Conference in London co-chaired by President Mohamud. Davutoğlu therein emphasized the importance of supporting Mohamud's Six-Pillar Policy for Somalia. Additionally, he brokered national reconciliation talks in Ankara between the Somali federal government and the Somaliland regional administration in northwestern Somalia. In a Ministry of Foreign Affairs statement, Davutoğlu indicated that the Turkish government's chief priority was in assisting the Somali federal government to consolidate its authority. He also reaffirmed Turkey's commitment to Somalia's territorial integrity and political sovereignty.

=== Syrian Civil War ===
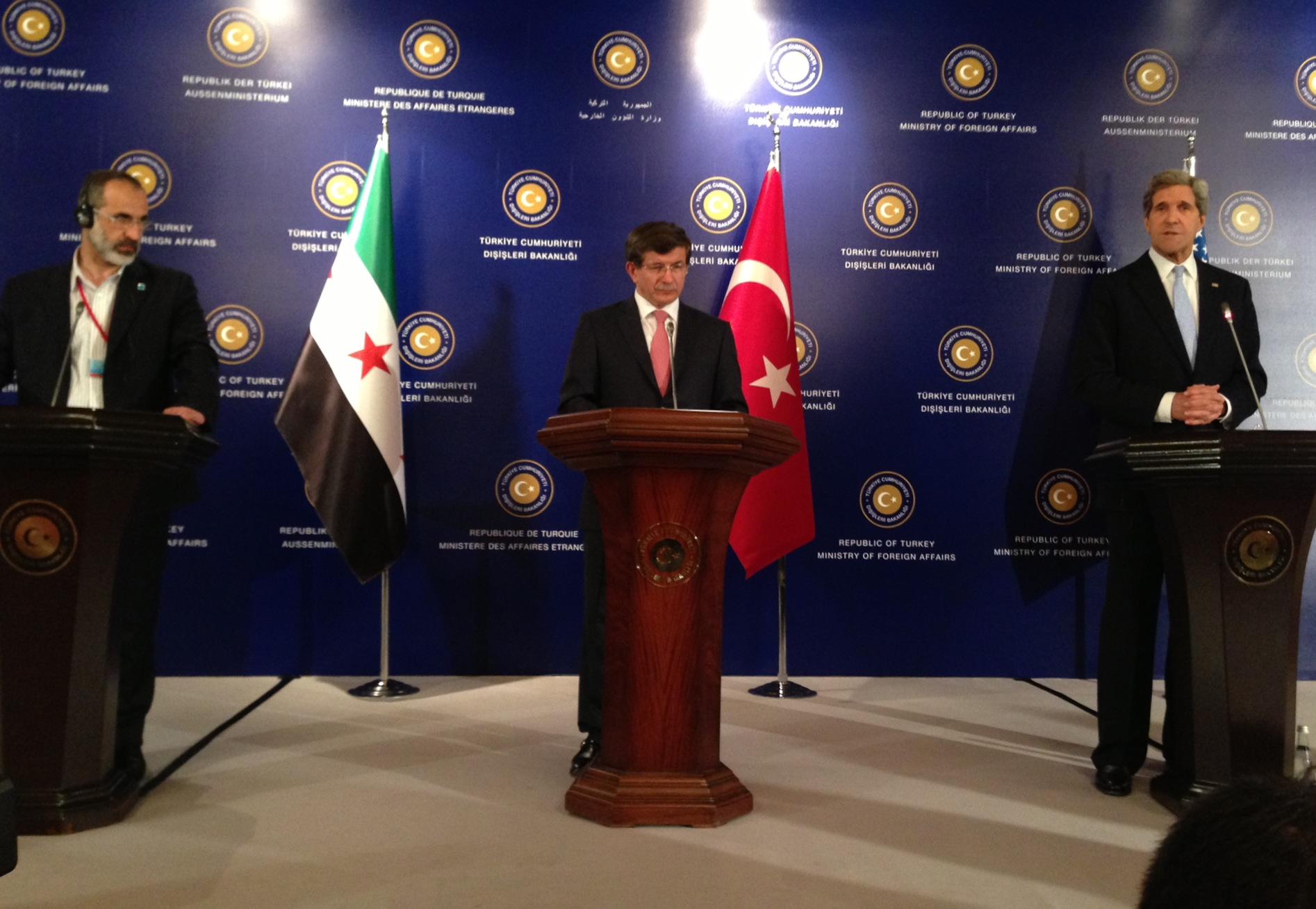
Davutoğlu with John Kerry and Syrian Opposition Council Chairman Moaz al-Khatib in Istanbul, May 2013

The Turkish government adopted a policy of strong opposition against Bashar al-Assad in the Syrian Civil War. Davutoğlu has supported the need to strengthen the rebels against Assad's regime, though his stance was complicated by the growing influence of Al-Qaeda related militant action within Syria as the civil war progressed.

In September 2012, Davutoğlu called for the establishment of "safe zones" in northern Syria to accommodate refugees and reduce the number of civilian casualties. He warned that continued global inactivity in regards to Syria will lead to failure "like Bosnia" in response to the United Nations General Assembly's failure to reach consensus.

In a conference of Syria-bordering countries hosted in Jordan, Davutoğlu stated in May 2014 that Turkey had spent US$3 billion on maintaining refugee camps, and that the United Nations needed to do more to finance their upkeeping. In the same conference, he claimed that "the world has failed Syria." Davutoğlu has pledged to support the United States should they authorise military action within Syria. Losing confidence in the United Nations Security Council, Davutoğlu has not ruled out a military option to resolving the crisis. The political opposition within Turkey has strongly criticised Davutoğlu's policy on Syria, claiming that it was responsible for the 2013 Reyhanlı bombings.

On 23 March 2014, a Syrian fighter jet was shot down by the Turkish Armed Forces. Davutoğlu claimed that the jet had violated Turkish airspace, whereas this allegation was denied by the Syrian authorities. The incident occurred 7 days before local elections, and Davutoğlu claimed that anyone who thought that the downing of the jet was an election ploy was "evil minded." He also stated that Turkey would not accept the 2014 Syrian presidential election as legitimate.

== Domestic views ==
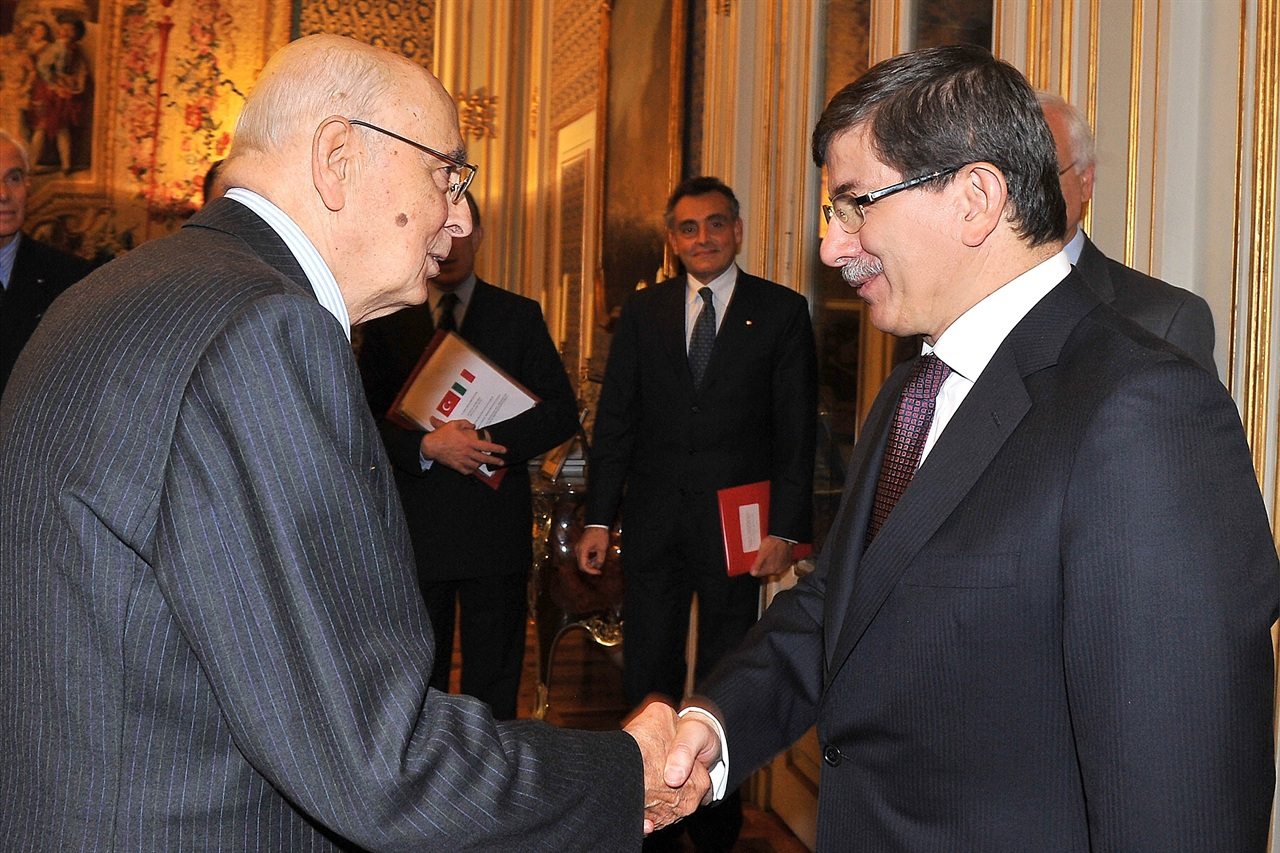
Davutoğlu meeting with Giorgio Napolitano, the 11th President of Italy

Despite serving as foreign minister, Davutoğlu maintained an active and influential role in shaping domestic policy, especially in response to the 2013–14 protests in Turkey and the 2013 government corruption scandal. His strong support for Prime Minister Recep Tayyip Erdoğan during such events has been seen as a key reason for his eventual nomination to succeed Erdoğan as leader of the AKP in August 2014. He came under scrutiny after the August 10 presidential election after it was revealed that the Ministry of Foreign Affairs had initially devised the highly unsuccessful appointment system for overseas voters.

=== Reyhanlı bombings ===
In response to an attack on the district of Reyhanlı in Hatay that killed 52 people, Davutoğlu stated that the killers were "known" and had been caught by the government, warning that no-one should attempt to cover up the suspects. He also stated that suspicion of the Syrian opposition and their possible involvement should be avoided, and that violent groups had no place in the Syrian peace process.

=== 2013–14 anti-government protests ===
Davutoğlu has been a heavy critic of both the aims and the conduct of the anti-government protests which began in late May 2013. Claiming that it was a critical event in Turkish politics, he criticized both the national and international media for their alleged support for the protests. He further claimed that in any European capital, a demonstration at a central square such as Taksim would be forced to disband within 18 days of protest. In response to the claim that protesters assaulted a woman wearing a headscarf which was later proved to be fabricated, Davutoğlu claimed that the victim was the wife of one of his close students. It had initially been rumoured that Davutoğlu had said "I am honoured by Gezi [protests]," though he himself later denied these rumours.

In an article written for The Guardian, Davutoğlu defended the police crackdown on protesters by claiming that the initially democratic demonstrations had been hijacked by militant groups. He also argued that his party was using undemocratic methods to pursue its agenda. Furthermore, he stated that the government was not polarizing the nation despite allegations to the contrary, but instead separating marginal groups with militant aims from democratic protests in an attempt to maintain the rule of law.

=== 2013 corruption scandal ===
Davutoğlu has denied that any form of corruption has occurred during the AKP government. He has stated that his party would "break the hand of anyone who tries to steal what belongs to the Turkish people, even if it is the hand of our brother." He has also claimed that the AKP has been the strongest force in tackling corruption. He had once stated that corruption is "the biggest crime."

In response to 17 December 2013 corruption scandal, Davutoğlu claimed that it was simply a transition from one era to another and that the scandal would not be remembered in 30 years time. He further claimed that his party would not yield or slow down in bringing about reforms that had been planned. Remaining loyal with Prime Minister Erdoğan, Davutoğlu claimed that the Prime Minister himself was the ultimate target of the scandal which had been sparked by followers of Fethullah Gulen's Cemaat Movement.

=== 2014 Soma mining disaster ===
Following an explosion in the Soma coal mine on 13 May which killed 301 miners, Davutoğlu declined all international offers for assistance. While thanking the nations for their offers to help, Davutoğlu stated that Turkish rescue workers would be able to respond to the disaster without foreign aid or help. On the subject of Israel offering aid despite diplomatic rifts between the two countries due to the 2014 Israel-Gaza conflict, Davutoğlu stated that the Turkish government would always receive offers of humanitarian assistance from any country in a positive manner regardless of any diplomatic situation.

Speaking from the Turkish Embassy in London during the Friends of Syria Group Conference, Davutoğlu offered his condolences and claimed that Turkey had been through similar "tests" before, such as during earthquakes.

In an interview with CNN, he stated that everything would be done to discover the causes of the accident. In response to Prime Minister Erdoğan's highly criticized statement in which he gave several examples from the past of other mining disasters in other countries as a justification for the accident, Davutoğlu defended the Prime Minister by stating that mining disasters were challenges that all other countries had to face. Unlike in the 2013–14 anti-government protests, Davutoğlu stated that he would respect protests as a result of the disaster and claimed that both he and Erdoğan understood the pain of the people in such emotional times.

== Premiership (2014–16) ==
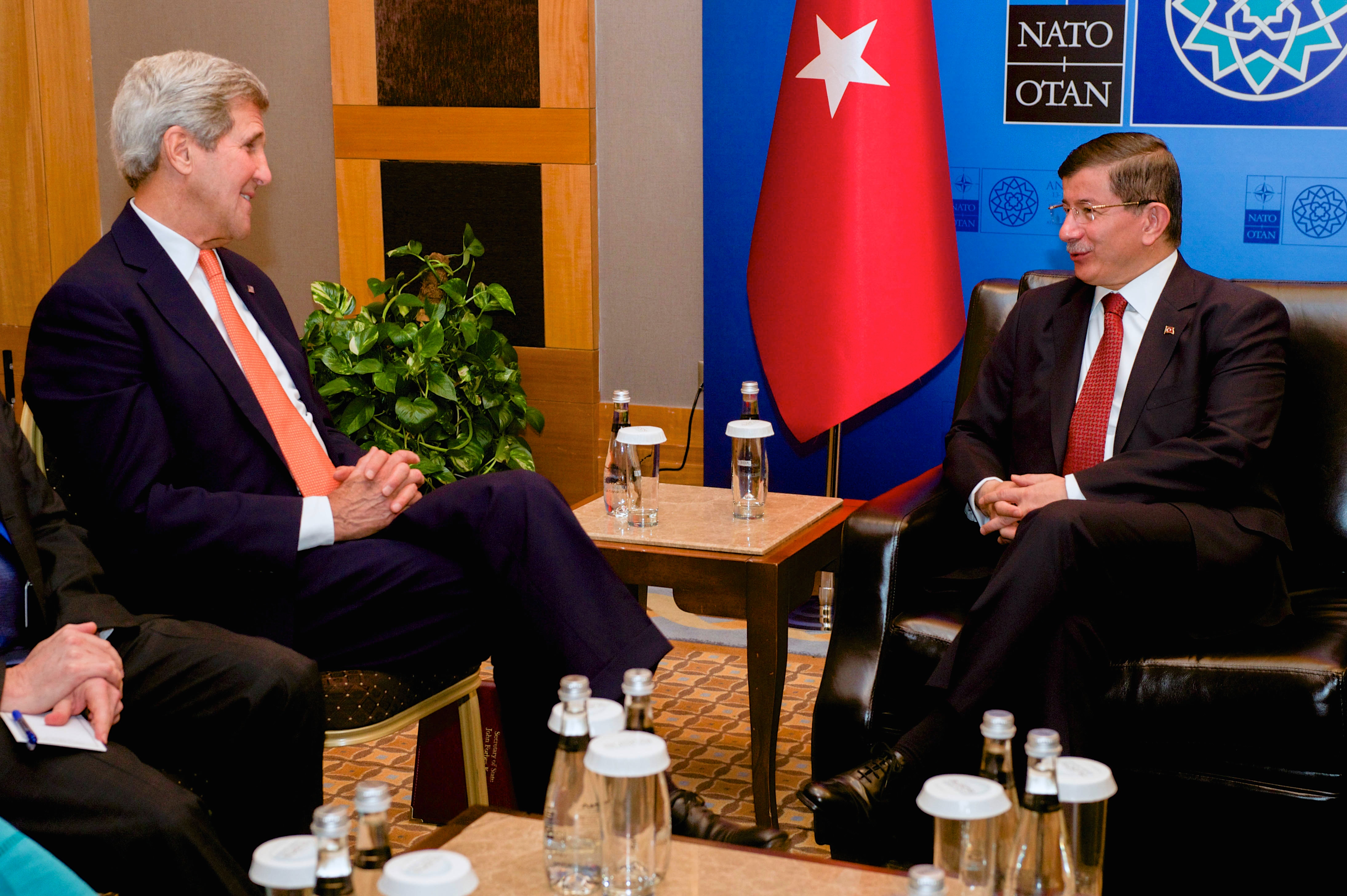
Prime Minister Ahmet Davutoğlu meets with US Secretary of State John Kerry during a NATO ministerial meeting in Antalya, 13 May 2015

Ahmet Davutoğlu became the 26th Prime Minister of Turkey on 29 August 2014 after his predecessor Recep Tayyip Erdoğan was elected as the 12th President of Turkey. He initially served as acting prime minister between 28 and 29 August 2014. He led the 62nd government of Turkey. His initial nomination to lead the AKP on 21 August was welcomed by Iranian foreign minister Mohammad Javad Zarif, who claimed that Davutoğlu was a very easy person to maintain dialogue with.

Davutoğlu has often been referred to as 'Erdoğan's Yıldırım Akbulut' due to the similar circumstances of his ascension to the Prime Minister's Office with that of Yıldırım Akbulut in 1989. Akbulut became prime minister after his predecessor, Turgut Özal was elected President. This bears similarity to Davutoğlu becoming prime minister due to his predecessor Recep Tayyip Erdoğan's election as president. In addition, Akbulut is widely perceived to have taken a docile approach during his time in office while President Özal took key political decisions despite occupying a mostly ceremonial office. This too, is claimed to bear similarity to Erdoğan's statements about his continued involvement in political affairs despite his ceremonial position, with Davutoğlu leading a submissive premiership.

=== Election as AKP leader ===
Upon the election of Recep Tayyip Erdoğan as president, the leadership of the AKP became vacant for the first time in the party's history. In a meeting chaired by Erdoğan that lasted three hours, Davutoğlu was put forward by the AKP Central Executive Board (MYK) as a candidate for the leadership on 21 August 2014. He was unanimously elected unopposed as party leader in the party's first extraordinary congress on 27 August, taking 1,382 votes. He thus formed his government on the 29th while Erdoğan took over as president. No other candidate has voiced opposition or has declared intention to run for the party leadership as a rival.

The AKP MYK's proposal to elect Davutoğlu as party leader has been attributed to several factors. Davutoğlu strongly supported Prime Minister Erdoğan during the 2013–14 anti-government protests and the 17 December government corruption scandal, and was thus seen as a close ally and partner that could work in harmony with Erdoğan after the latter became president. Davutoğlu's loyalty and similar foreign policy ideals to Erdoğan, as well as his active involvement in situations such as the Gaza conflict and the Syrian Civil War has resulted in strong support from AKP members and supporters. Critics of the AKP have put forward the view that Davutoğlu's loyalty to Erdoğan will allow Erdoğan as president to continue pursuing his agenda and controlling the government, through the use of the President's rarely used cabinet-calling powers, while Davutoğlu himself takes a docile approach.

In contrast, it has also been alleged that Davutoğlu would not take a docile approach based on his strong independence as foreign minister, during which he acted without the direct consent of the Prime Minister while appointing ministerial staff. Marmara University Assistant Professor Yüksel Taskin is a proponent of this view, claiming that Davutoğlu has planned on becoming prime minister for over 20 years, which would make it seem unlikely that he would consent to acting as Recep Tayyip Erdoğan's puppet.

=== Economic policy ===
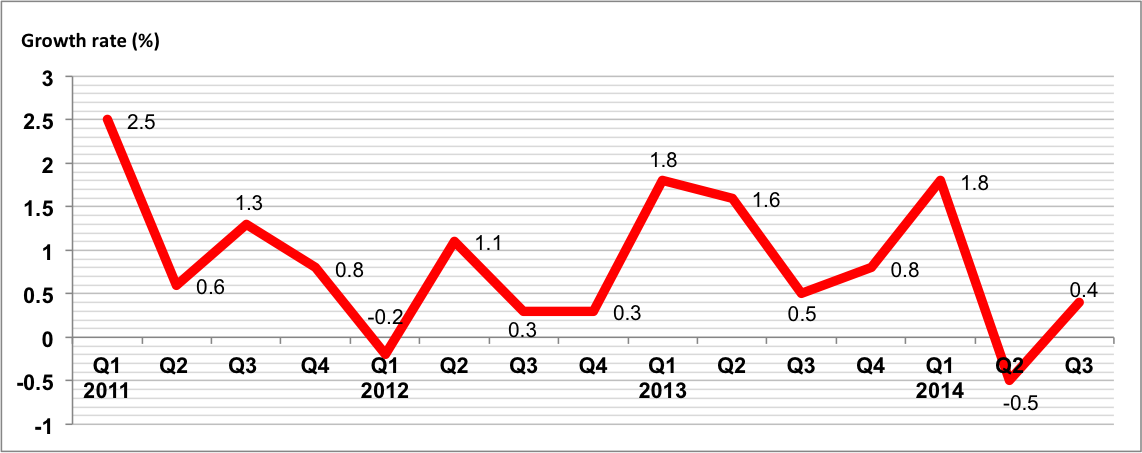
Economic growth rate in Turkey between 2011 and 2014

Deputy Prime Minister Ali Babacan retained his position in Davutoğlu's new cabinet with responsibility over the economy. Babacan, who has been an advocate of neoliberal economic policies and independence for the Turkish Central Bank, has been at odds with Erdoğan and other AKP politicians who advocate a more Islamist-orientated economic agenda such as Numan Kurtulmuş and Yiğit Bulut. Finance Minister Mehmet Şimşek, a supporter of Babacan, also kept his post in the new cabinet. Although the retainment of the two pro-liberal economy ministers pleased investors, the appointment of Kurtulmuş as another deputy prime minister has also created speculation over a potential economic divide within the new government.

Davutoğlu became prime minister at a time of economic slowdown and uncertainty, which he blames on the weak global economy, particularly the Eurozone. The government slashed economic growth forecasts from 4% to 3.3% in 2014, and from 5% to 4% in 2015. The Organisation for Economic Co-operation and Development (OECD) also lowered its forecasts from 4% to 3.2% in 2015 and estimated 4% growth in 2016. On 6 November 2014, Davutoğlu announced plans to boost the economy through greater global integration. Reform packages included a 9-point plan to boost the technology, energy, health and tourism sectors. With a GDP of $820 billion, a budget deficit of 7%, a current account deficit of 7.9% and an unemployment rate of nearly 10% in 2013, Davutoğlu's government will target a GDP of $1.3 trillion, a budget deficit of 5.2%, a current account deficit of 5.2% and an unemployment rate of 7% by 2018. Davutoğlu has also aimed to reduce the country's dependency of foreign energy imports, and pledged to not pursue a populist economic agenda in the run-up to the June 2015 general election.

Economic confidence declined following what was perceived to be an attempt by the government to shut down Bank Asya, which it claims is linked to the Gülen Movement. The government revoked the Bank's ability to collect taxes on behalf of the state, and the bank subsequently lost 25% of its cash deposits after several firms withdrew more than ₺4 billion after a smear campaign. The bank was banned for five weeks from trading on the stock exchange, with the decision raising questions over the government's influence over the legally independent stock exchange authority (BİST). The government was criticised globally for causing economic concern amongst the international financial community, potentially resulting in a reduction of investment into Turkey due to financial insecurity and political uncertainty.

On 2 September 2014, Deputy Prime Minister Ali Babacan announced a new policy to collect income data from citizens in order to apply different debt repayment opportunities in proportion to wages. The new database will aim to stop citizens from becoming indebted with large interest payments.

=== Government corruption allegations ===
Upon becoming prime minister, Davutoğlu inherited a substantial number of corruption claims against the AKP and the previous Erdoğan government. On 1 September, Davutoğlu vowed to pursue a strong fight against corruption as part of his government agenda. His true intentions have been disputed by the two main opposition parties, namely the Republican People's Party (CHP) and the Nationalist Movement Party (MHP). CHP leader Kemal Kılıçdaroğlu claimed that Davutoğlu had been appointed as prime minister by Erdoğan in order to end the corruption investigations dating from the 17 December 2013 scandal. On 2 September, the Istanbul Attorney General formally dismissed the cases against 96 suspects, while the MHP claimed that the government was behind the decision. The prospect of Davutoğlu's government taking a strong approach against corruption is therefore doubted by political analysts and opposition members.

=== Constitutional reform ===
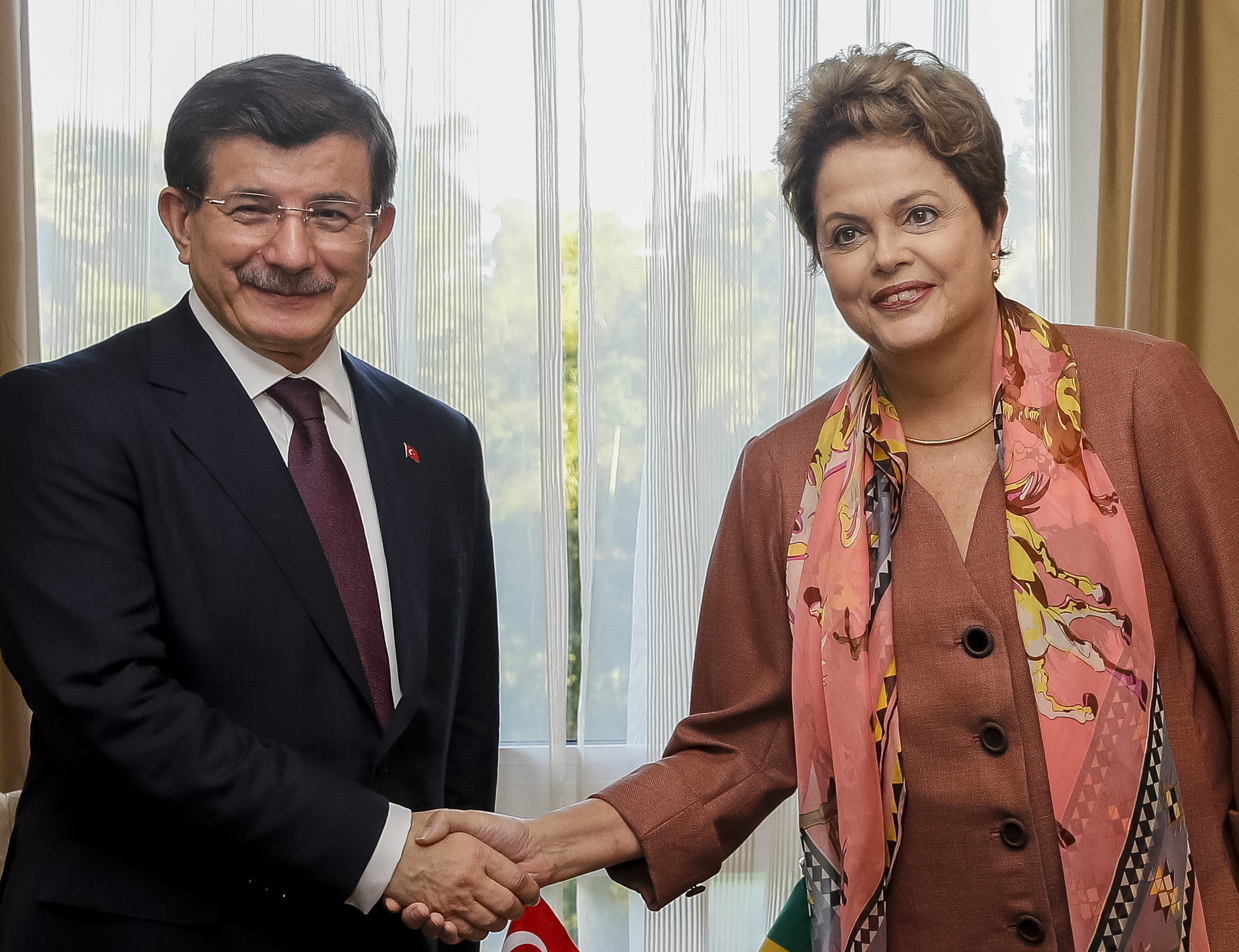
Davutoğlu with Brazilian President Dilma Rousseff in November 2014

Davutoğlu has stated that his main priority is to draft a new constitution after the June 2015 general election. He has called for opposition parties to be more engaged in this process. He claimed that the current constitution did not enshrine necessary checks and balances or guarantee a stable democratic system, nor did it encourage political participation due to its strict centrist approach. He has thus called for a more liberal, civilian and pluralistic constitution which would respond to the needs of modern Turkey and increase the welfare of its citizens. The opposition have claimed that the true aims of Davutoğlu's proposed reforms are to diminish the principles of Mustafa Kemal Atatürk and to dismantle the independent judiciary.

=== Workers' rights ===
Turkey has the highest number of workers' deaths within Europe, which is the third highest in the world according to the International Labour Organization. The Turkish Statistics Office claims that 1,754 workers deaths have occurred between 2009 and 2014.

Especially after the Soma mine disaster in 2013, Turkish workers' rights and working conditions had come under heavy international and domestic scrutiny. Davutoğlu's government has pledged to improve worker safety in response to the large number of accidents in mines and construction sites. On 10 September 2014, the government passed a long proposed bill which waived the debts of all the family members of those killed in Soma, gave at least one family member the right to work in a state institution while also granting a "death salary" to them. The new law also limited workers to working a maximum of 36 hours a week and 6 hours a day, as well as reducing the retirement age from 55 to 50 while forcing employers to assign job security experts, doctors and health workers for their employees.

On 6 September, an industrial lift accident in a construction site at Şişli, Istanbul which killed 10 workers renewed outrage regarding the lack of job safety. Social unrest in response to the disaster resulted in riot police firing tear gas at workers' rights protesters. Davutoğlu subsequently promised to review laws regarding workplace safety and implement regulations more carefully, though the alleged links between the owner of the construction site and the AKP also resulted in sharp criticism. Calling the dead workers "martyrs" despite Deputy Prime Minister Bülent Arınç's controversial rejection of the term, Davutoğlu also announced that he would be meeting with workers' unions and calling relatives of those killed to offer his condolences. In a notable incident, a relative which had been called by Davutoğlu accused the Prime Minister of committing a murder, and threatened to take him and his government to court.

In response to the September lift accident, Davutoğlu announced new measures to offer rewards to businesses with a good worker safety record as an incentive to lower accidents.

Another mine accident, the second in six months, occurred in the town of Ermenek, Karaman Province on 28 October 2014. Three days later, on 31 October 17 agricultural workers were killed in a bus crash in Yalvaç in Isparta Province. The government received heavy criticism for what was perceived to be an ongoing 'massacre' of workers in Turkey.

=== Dismantling the 'parallel state' and legal reforms ===
Having pledged to continue Erdoğan's fight against Fethullah Gülen and his Cemaat Movement, Davutoğlu's government conducted large-scale arrests of police officers in an attempt to dismantle Gülen's 'parallel state'. The crackdown on the police force led to arrests of several officers accused of plotting a coup, causing uproar due to the alleged legal mishandling of their cases. In July, the number of officers arrested had already reached 100. Most of the detained officers were discharged shortly after being arrested after their cases collapsed due to a lack of evidence, leading to questions in regard to the government's true motives. Such cases occurred in Kocaeli, Adana and Kilis.

== Resignation as Prime Minister ==
On 5 May 2016, Davutoğlu announced his resignation as leader of the AKP, adding that he would call for an Extraordinary Party Congress on 22 May 2016 to elect a successor. He added that he would not stand for re-election as party leader, thereby effectively announcing his resignation as Prime Minister of Turkey. His resignation was a result of a sharp deterioration in relations with President Recep Tayyip Erdoğan, who supports an executive presidential system of government that would result in the dissolution or severe reduction of powers of the Office of the Prime Minister.

=== Relationship with Erdoğan ===
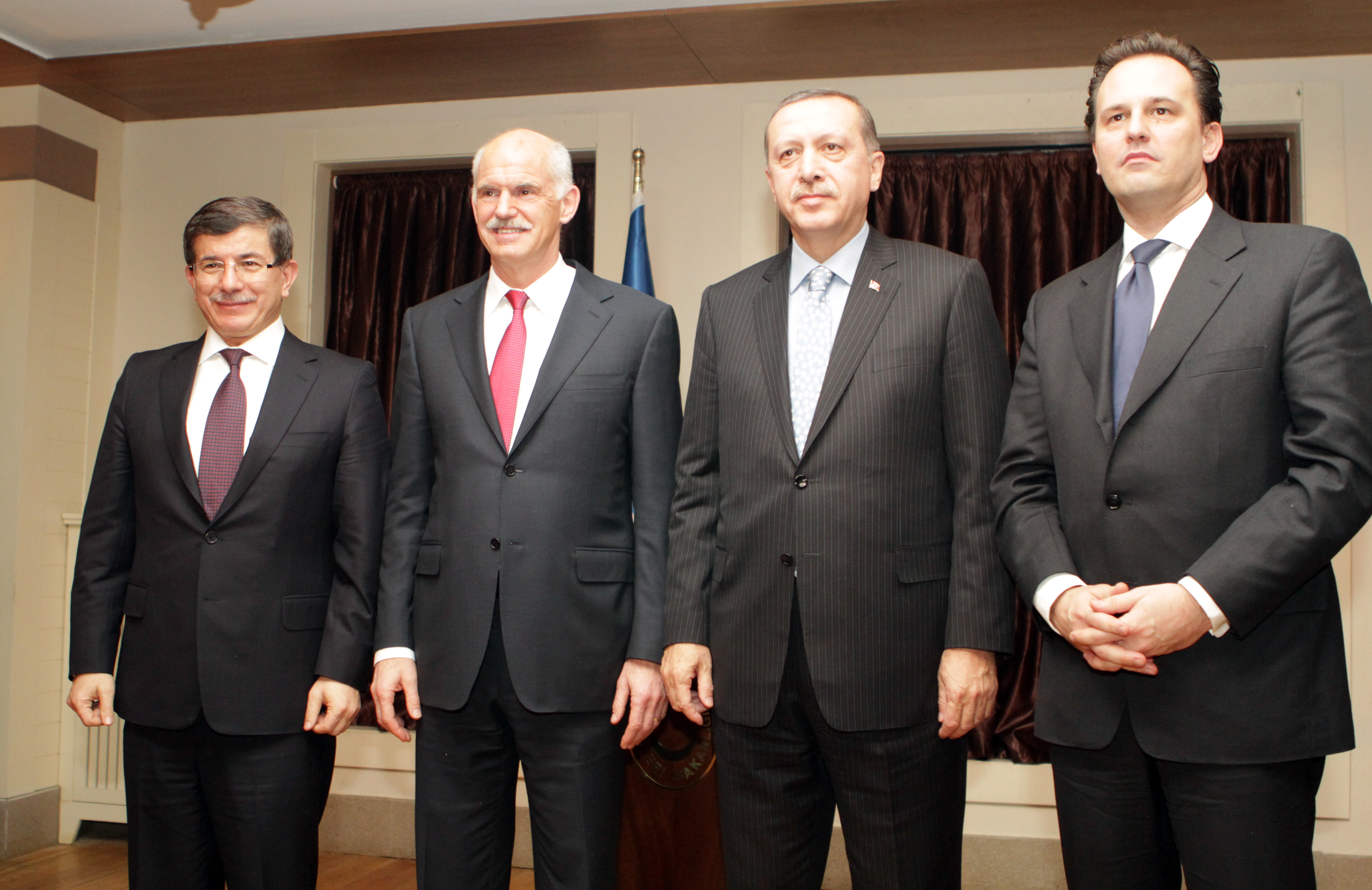
Davutoğlu and Recep Tayyip Erdoğan with former Greek Prime Minister George Papandreou and Foreign Minister Dimitris Droutsas

With opinion divided on whether Davutoğlu would be willing to lead a submissive premiership while President Erdoğan took key government decisions, many observers had noted a growing power struggle between the Prime Minister and President in the lead-up to the June 2015 general election. Alleged disputes focused foremost on the AKP parliamentary candidate lists, with both Erdoğan and Davutoğlu allegedly drawing up a different list of candidates. In April 2015, the pro-opposition OdaTV reported that Erdoğan had threatened to put Davutoğlu in a position 'worse than Ecevit' if Davutoğlu did not remove 23 candidates who were seen as close to outgoing Deputy Prime Minister Bülent Arınç, to which Davutoğlu obliged. Arınç, who was barred from standing as a candidate, openly criticised Erdoğan for getting involved with the government's affairs regarding the solution process with Kurdish militants and caused a public polemic between himself, Erdoğan and Ankara Mayor Melih Gökçek as a result.

Before the election campaign, Erdoğan chaired a cabinet meeting in January, with a picture of the meeting causing widespread commotion on Twitter due to Davutoğlu perceivably looking grumpy during the event. Despite having the constitutional right, the chairing of a cabinet meeting by a president was a rare ordeal in Turkish history, with the opposition demanding a legitimate reason for why Erdoğan felt the need to do so. The President's decision to chair the cabinet was attributed to providing 'a greater pool of ideas'. With journalists hinting at a growing rift between Erdoğan and Davutoğlu, Davutoğlu made a statement praising Erdoğan and saying that his power as prime minister had not been weakened by the event. He added further that individuals who were looking for signs of disagreements within the AKP would 'yet again be disappointed', adding that there was no rift between the government and the presidency.

=== April–May 2016 disagreements ===
By late April and early May 2016, relations between Davutoğlu and Erdoğan were said to have reached breaking point. An anonymous list produced by Erdoğan supporters on a WordPress blog, named the Pelican files, detailed 27 different sources of disagreements between the Prime Minister and President and caused their relations to significantly deteriorate publicly. The list included allegations that Davutoğlu was critical of Erdoğan's desire for an executive presidential system of government. The files also indicated that Davutoğlu opposed Erdoğan's policy of pursuing a military-only solution to combating the Kurdistan Workers Party (PKK). Further allegations included disagreements over the AKP's candidate lists for the 7 June and 1 November general elections, as well as the list of Central Executive Decision Committee candidates fielded in the party's 5th Ordinary Congress. Davutoğlu was also accused of attempting to establish his own media outlet while giving interviews to existing outlets that had been critical of Erdoğan. General disagreements over government legislation, such as a botched Transparency Law, were also identified as sources of disagreement. A journalist alleged that Davutoğlu had already submitted his resignation earlier for unrelated reasons, but that this had been turned down by Erdoğan.

In late April, the AKP Central Executive Decision Committee (MKYK) voted to strip the powers of the party leader to appoint provincial and district party executives. Although Davutoğlu claimed that he had long been in favour of the decision, it was alleged that Erdoğan had phoned the Committee members and instructed them to relieve the party leader of this right. Following the release of the pelican files and the MKYK's decision, Davutoğlu gave a speech to the party's parliamentary group, claiming that he would not yield to 'games of virtual charlatans' and that he would 'trample over any office' if necessary. The speech was shorter than usual and was received by some commentators as a 'resignation speech', with politicians close to Erdoğan responding on Twitter with pro-Erdoğan tweets. It was reported that Erdoğan's staunch refusal to approve bureaucratic appointments made by Davutoğlu as Prime Minister had effectively caused a governmental deadlock.

=== Meeting with Erdoğan and resignation speech ===
On 4 May 2016, Davutoğlu met Erdoğan at the Presidential Complex in what the Presidency described as a 'routine meeting'. The meeting lasted for 1 hour and 40 minutes, having been held a day before the usual weekly meeting between the Prime Minister and President. It was reported that Davutoğlu had been convinced to not submit his resignation at the meeting, though surprised media commentators by arriving at the Presidential Complex without the usual briefcase or documents. Shortly after the meeting, it was announced that the AKP would hold an Extraordinary Congress in late May and that Davutoğlu would not stand as a candidate, confirming that a last-minute agreement between the two men had not been reached.

A day later, Davutoğlu met with the party's MKYK for a final time before announcing that the party would hold an Extraordinary Congress on 22 May. He stated that he would not run as a candidate, effectively confirming his resignation as party leader and prime minister. He claimed that he would not seek to divide the party after stepping down and continue as an MP, pledging his unwavering support for Erdoğan and his political agenda. In an openly critical statement, he also claimed that his resignation did not arise out of choice, but had become a necessity. He also claimed that he would reject office based on bargaining with other actors. His statement was in contrast to Erdoğan's account of the events, where he had claimed that the resignation was Davutoğlu's own decision.

=== Domestic and global reactions ===
The main opposition Republican People's Party (CHP) referred to the resignation as the '4 May Palace Coup', claiming that Erdoğan had toppled a Prime Minister who had been elected for a four-year term just seven months before with 49.5% of the vote. Attributing Erdoğan's indifference to the national will to his personal desire for greater power, CHP leader Kemal Kılıçdaroğlu wished Davutoğlu farewell and called for all democrats to 'resist' the coup, though some CHP members of parliament such as Sezgin Tanrıkulu received Davutoğlu's resignation more critically, denouncing his 21-month premiership as the 'bloodiest in Turkey's history'.

The White House made a statement saying that they did not expect any change in Turkish-American relations due to Davutoğlu's departure, calling him a 'good ally' to the United States while renewing calls for greater freedom of the press. General John Allen, however, claimed that while relations with Davutoğlu were strong, relations with his successor could be more difficult.

The German government issued a statement stating that they would work equally well with Turkey's next Prime Minister as they had done with Davutoğlu. A government spokesperson emphasised that the EU-Turkey Deal on the Migrant Crisis was between Turkey and the EU, not between the EU and Davutoğlu. Following Davutoğlu's resignation, Erdoğan made a statement criticising the European Union and stated that Turkey would not change their anti-terror laws in return for visa-free entry to Schengen Area, again causing negotiations for EU membership to stall.

The Turkish lira fell sharply to the US dollar shortly after the announcement. By the end of 4 May, the Lira stood at ₺2.97 to the Dollar. The credit agency Moody's claimed that Davutoğlu's departure, as well as general political instability in Turkey, would negatively effect the country's credit rating.

International media commentators overwhelmingly viewed Davutoğlu's resignation as a sign of Erdoğan's intolerance of any dissent towards his aims of turning Turkey into an executive presidency and his desire to exercise greater control over the government despite his current ceremonial position as a non-executive President. Both Domestic and international journalists agreed that the candidate set to succeed Davutoğlu, with key potential candidates including Erdoğan son-in-law Berat Albayrak and close supporters Binali Yıldırım, Mustafa Şentop, Mehmet Müezzinoğlu, Efkan Ala and Bekir Bozdağ, would be far more compliant with Erdoğan's political agenda. Commentators further claimed that Erdoğan's long-desired 'presidential system' had de facto been implemented after Davutoğlu's resignation, since his successor would be expected to effectively delegate all his or her Prime Ministerial decision-making duties to the President while focusing on policy implementation only.

== Future Party (GP) ==
In December 2019, Davutoğlu founded his own party, the Future Party (Turkish: Gelecek Partisi, GP) as a right conservative party. The party advocates a return to a parliamentary system and a new constitution. On 29 July 2026, Davutoğlu said that the Future Party would be dissolved and that he would exit politics.

== Electoral record ==
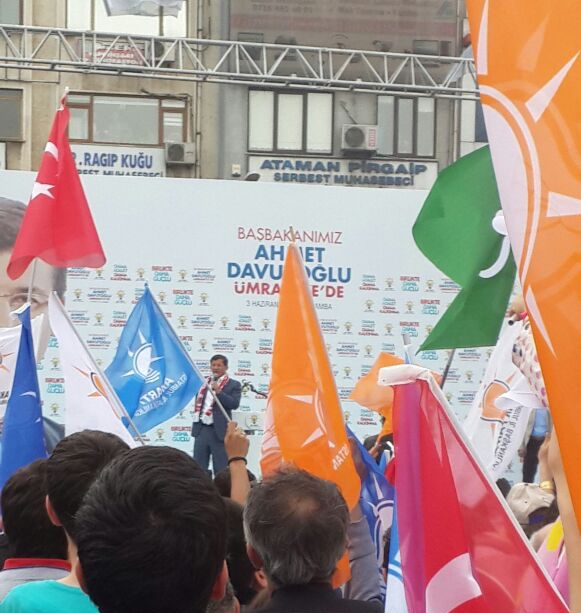
Davutoğlu speaking at an AKP rally in Ümraniye, Istanbul on 3 June 2015, ahead of the 2015 general election.

As prime minister, Davutoğlu contested two general elections. He was an AKP parliamentary candidate in 2011 and the leader of the AKP in both the June 2015 and November 2015 general elections.

=== General elections ===
Davutoğlu was made Minister of Foreign Affairs in 2009, despite not being a member of parliament. He was elected as an MP for Konya in the 2011 general election as the first candidate on the AKP's provincial party list. His party won just under 70% of the vote, the highest the AKP won in any province, gaining 11 of the 14 seats up for election. He resumed his role as foreign minister after Recep Tayyip Erdoğan formed his third government.

Elected leader in the 2014 Extraordinary Congress, Davutoğlu led the AKP through the 2015 general election. During the campaign, Tayyip Erdoğan (who was then President and therefore constitutionally required to exercise political neutrality) held several rallies under the guise of 'public openings', where he was covertly accused of campaigning for the AKP. As such, media commentators regarded Davutoğlu to be leading only 50% of his party's election campaign. The election results proved to be a disappointment for the AKP, with the party winning 40.87% of the vote (a decrease of almost 9% since 2011) and losing their parliamentary majority for the first time since the party's first election in 2002. With 258 seats (276 needed for a majority), Davutoğlu nevertheless made a balcony speech declaring victory at the AKP headquarters in Ankara.

General election record of Ahmet Davutoğlu 0–10% 10–20% 20–30% 30–40% 40–50% 50–60% 60–70% 70–80%
Party	Election	Vote	Seats	Result	Outcome	Map
AKP	7 June 2015	18,867,411	258 / 550 (▼69)	40.87% ▼8.96 pp	#1st Hung parliament	
AKP	1 November 2015	23,681,926	317 / 550 (▲59)	49.50% ▲8.63 pp	#1st AKP majority	
GP (Note: As part of the Republican People's Party list)	2023		10 / 600 (new)		AKP majority	

=== Local elections ===
Party	Election	Votes	Share of votes	Map
GP	2024	34,2120	.07%	

== Selected works ==
- Alternative Paradigms: The Impact of Islamic and Western Weltanschauungs on Political Theory. University Press of America, 1993
- Civilizational Transformation and the Muslim World. Quill, 1994
- Stratejik derinlik: Türkiye'nin uluslararası konumu. Küre Yayınları, 2001
- Osmanlı Medeniyeti: Siyaset İktisat Sanat. Klasik, 2005
- Küresel Bunalım. Küre, 2002.

== See also ==
- Foreign policy of the Recep Tayyip Erdoğan government
- List of Turkish diplomats
- Intermediate Region
- Hellenoturkism
- Ali Babacan

== Notes ==
Political offices
Preceded by Ali Babacan	Minister of Foreign Affairs; 2009–2014	Succeeded by Mevlüt Çavuşoğlu
Preceded by Recep Tayyip Erdoğan	Prime Minister of Turkey; 2014–2016	Succeeded by Binali Yıldırım
Party political offices
Preceded by Recep Tayyip Erdoğan	Leader of the Justice and Development Party; 2014–2016	Succeeded by Binali Yıldırım
