= Place names in Azerbaijan =

Place names in Azerbaijan is a set of geographical names, including the names of natural and cultural objects on the territory of the Republic of Azerbaijan.

== Formation and composition of toponymy ==
The toponymy of Azerbaijan is extremely complex due, first of all, to the complexity of the history and features of the formation of the Azerbaijani language, as well as the presence of its local features (dialects). There are 4 dialect groups in the modern Azerbaijani language:

- eastern: Baku, Guba and Shamakhi dialects, Mughan and Lankaran dialects;
- western: Karabakh, Gandja and Qazakh dialects, Ayrum dialect;
- northern: Shaki dialect, Zagatala-Qakh dialect;
- southern: Nakhichevan and Ordubad dialects.

The country's toponymy contains traces of Iranian, Caucasian, Turkic and Arabic languages. Thus, the Iranian languages are the basis of such toponyms as Baku, Lankaran, Absheron and others, the Caucasian languages are the basis of the toponyms Khachmaz, Dustair, Jibis etc. Nadir shah, King of Persia ordered the foundation of Agsu city whose name means white water in Azerbaijani.

Between 1987 and 2018, 16 cities out of 66 were renamed.

== Research ==
An important role in the formation of toponymy as a science in Azerbaijan belongs to Ramzi Yuzbashev, the author of the monograph "Azerbaijani geographical terms". An interpretation of ancient toponyms of Transcaucasia is given in the work named "50 words" by Abdulazal Damirchizade. A comparative analysis of Azerbaijani place names of the Middle Ages was conducted by academician A. Akhundov. Linguist A. Aliyev noted the importance of the formation of toponymy as a science in his dissertation titled "Toponymy of the Azerbaijani Western regions".

A classification of toponyms of Turkic origin is given in the work of Y. Mammadov "Names in the Orkhon-Yenisei monuments". Academician Z.Buniatov, researchers I. Markwart, G. Hubschman, K. Gan, and others also analyzed the linguistic features of toponymic terms. Ann explanatory dictionary of toponyms of Azerbaijani origin on the territory of western Azerbaijan and Georgia was compiled by Azerbaijani scientists – G. Geybullaev and B. Budagov.

President of Azerbaijan Ilham Aliyev signed decrees on 5 February 2008 and 26 April 2012, aimed at a comprehensive study of the country's cultural monuments. Since then, the national body responsible for implementing the toponymic policy is Committee on Land Issues and Cartography.

Currently, there is a fund of Azerbaijani toponyms operating in the country. The foundation's employees are working on the systematic compilation of dictionaries and toponymic maps of particular regions of Azerbaijan.

There is the Commission on Toponymy operating under the National Assembly (Milli Majlis) of Azerbaijan as well. The Chairman of the Commission is Isa Habibbeyli.

Names of more than 4,650 settlements of Azerbaijan have been translated into English and Russian by Institute of Linguistics of Azerbaijan so far.

== See also ==
- Azerbaijan (toponym)

== Bibliography ==
1. Гейбуллаев Г.А. К этногенезу азербайджанцев. т.1. Баку: Элм, 1991, 552с
2. Мирзазаде Ч.Х. Топонимы Азербайджана в средневековых арабских географических источниках. Баку: Элм, 1988, 120с
3. Аббасова М.А., Бендалиев Н.С., Мамедов Х.Г. Топонимика юго-восточной части Кавказа. Баку: Эльм, 1993, 196 с.
4. Энциклопедический словарь азербайджанcких топонимов. В 2 томах. Баку: Шарг-Гярб, 2007, 304 с.
5. Байрамов И.М. Топонимы тюркского происхождения Западного Азербайджана. Баку: Эльм, 2002, 696 с.
6. Будагов Б.А.Алиев А.И. Эпос «Китаби деде Коркут» и топонимы // Журнал “Наука и жизнь”, No. 3, Баку: 1986, с. 9–10.
7. Будагов Б.А., Гейбуллаев Г.А. Объяснительный словарь грузинских топонимов тюркского происхождения. Баку: изд. «Исмаиллы», 2002, 320 с.
8. Алиев В.Г. Топонимика Азербайджана. Баку: Госпедуниверситет, 1999, 276 с.
9. Ахмедов Т.М. Основы азербайджанских топонимов. Баку: изд. Бакгосуниверситета, 1991, 312 с.
10. Курбанов А.М. Ономалогия азербайджанского языка. Баку: Маариф, 1988, 596 с.
11. Машадиев Г.И. Исторические и лингвистические исследования азербайджанских топонимов. Баку: Эльм ве тахсил, 2010. – 232 с.
12. Тапдыгов А.С. Мифологические топонимы на азербайджанском языке. Баку: Эльм ве тахсил, 2013, 128 с.
13. Юзбашев Р., Алиев К., Садиев Ш. Географические названия Азербайджана. Очерки. Баку: Маариф, 1972, 110 c
