= Şafak Pavey =

Turkish diplomat, columnist and politician

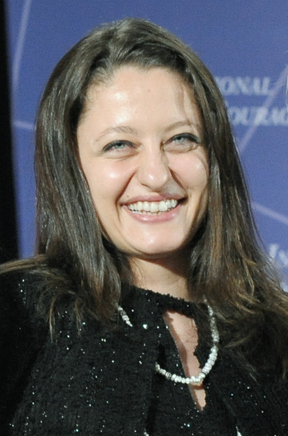

Deputy Speaker of the Grand National Assembly
- In office 9 July 2015 – 1 November 2015
- Speaker: İsmet Yılmaz
- Serving with: Naci Bostancı; Koray Aydın; Yurdusev Özsökmenler
- Preceded by: Güldal Mumcu
- Succeeded by: Akif Hamzaçebi

Member of the Grand National Assembly
- In office 12 June 2011 – 25 October 2017
- Constituency: İstanbul (I) (2011, June 2015, Nov 2015)

Personal details
- Born: 10 July 1976 (age 50) Ankara, Turkey
- Party: Republican People's Party (CHP)
- Spouse: Paul Pavey (m. 1995–1997)
- Education: University of Westminster, London School of Economics
- Occupation: Diplomat, columnist and politician
- Website: www.safakpavey.com

Şafak Pavey (born 10 July 1976) is a Turkish diplomat, columnist and politician. She was a member of the Turkish Grand National Assembly from the main opposition Republican People's Party (CHP) representing Istanbul Province. She is the first disabled woman ever elected to the Turkish parliament, and is a member of the United Nations Committee on the Rights of Persons with Disabilities. In 1996, before she turned 20, her left arm and left leg were amputated after a train accident in Switzerland.

In 2012, Pavey was honored by the United States Department of State with the International Women of Courage Award. She announced her resignation as a member of parliament on 15 September 2017, citing health reasons. The resignation took effect on 25 October 2017.

== Early life and education ==
Pavey was born on 10 July 1976 in Ankara to Şahin Baştürk and Ayşe Önal, a well-known journalist and writer. In 1994, she moved to Switzerland with her husband to study art and film. On 24 May 1996, Pavey was on a train in Zurich when an accident occurred. She was critically injured, according to her husband. Pavey's left arm and left leg were amputated and she nearly died from the injuries. Pavey was conscious after the train accident. It was before her 20th birthday. One year later, she went to London to pursue her education. She studied international relations at the University of Westminster and completed her post-graduate studies at the London School of Economics.

== Career ==
Pavey served in the Office of the United Nations High Commissioner for Refugees, being responsible for external relations and humanitarian aid in countries such as Algeria, Egypt, Iran, Lebanon and Syria. She worked as the spokesperson of UNHCR for Central Europe in Hungary and later as the head of human rights treaty body secretariat at the Office of the United Nations High Commissioner for Human Rights.

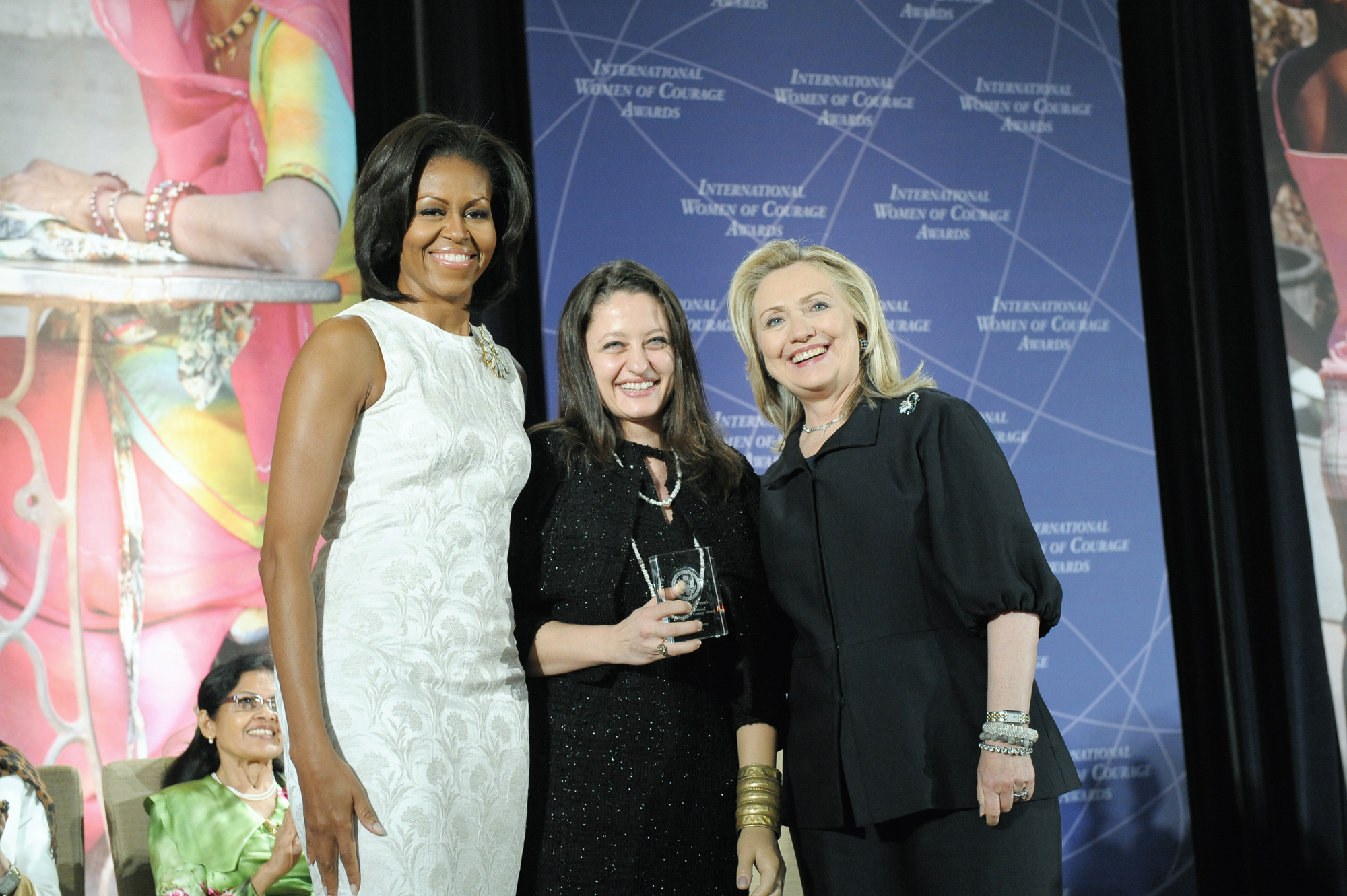
Safak Pavey with Michelle Obama (left) and Hillary Clinton (right) at the 2012 IWOC Award ceremony

She was a columnist for the Istanbul-based Armenian-Turkish bilingual weekly Agos, and has authored three books. She carried out joint projects with Harvard University, the Royal Academy of Arts in London and the Norwegian Design Council on inclusive/universal design and displaced persons. The book 13 Numarali Peron (Platform Number 13) narrating the train accident experience, written jointly by her mother Ayşe Önal and Pavey herself, became a best-seller in Turkey. She collaborated with author and Nobel Peace Laureate Shirin Ebadi on the book "Refugee Rights in Iran".

After fifteen years living abroad, Pavey returned to Turkey in 2011 and ran for a parliament seat. She left her position at the United Nations in 2012 and was elected as Deputy of Istanbul Province for the Republican People's Party, becoming the first disabled female member of the Turkish Parliament. As part of her parliamentary work, she is a member of the Turkey-EU-Accession Committee, the EU-Turkey Joint Parliamentary Committee, the Euro-Med Parliamentary Assembly for the Mediterranean Union, the Euro-Med Sub-Committee on Energy, Water and Environment, and vice-chair and Member of the Turkish Parliamentary Friendship Groups with South Korea and Norway. She was subsequently appointed as one of the CHP's deputy chairpersons, responsible for environmental and social policy.

She is an Honorary Associate of the National Secular Society.

== Honors ==
- International Woman of Courage by the US Department of State
- Outstanding Young Person of the World Award by the Junior Chamber International
- Secularist of the Year 2014 by the UK National Secular Society

== Family ==
According to Hürriyet newspaper, Şafak Pavey's mother is a cousin of Deniz Gezmiş, the Turkish political activist of the late 1960s.
