= Van (electoral district) =

Electoral district for the Grand National Assembly of Turkey

Coordinates: 38°24′N 43°43′E

- electoral district for the Grand National Assembly of Turkey
- Van shown within Turkey
- Province: Van
- Electorate: 547,016

Current electoral district
- Created: 1920
- Seats: 8 Historical: 7 (1999-2011) 6 (1995-1999) 5 (1987-1995) 4 (1961-1987) 3 (1957-1961) 4 (1954-1957)
- MPs: List: Burhan Kayatürk, AK Party Kayhan Türkmenoğlu, AK Party Pervin Buldan, DEM Party Zülküf Uçar, DEM Party Gülcan Kaçmaz Sayyiğit, DEM Party Sinan Çiftyürek DEM Party Gülderen Varlı, DEM Party Mahmut Dindar, DEM Party
- Turnout at last election: 80.49%
- Representation
- DEM: 6 / 8
- AK Party: 2 / 8

Van is an electoral district of the Grand National Assembly of Turkey. It elects eight members of parliament (deputies) to represent the province of the same name for a four-year term by the D'Hondt method, a party-list proportional representation system.

== Members ==
Population reviews of each electoral district are conducted before each general election, which can lead to certain districts being granted a smaller or greater number of parliamentary seats. Van's seat allocation has gradually increased over the last sixty years, from three seats in 1957 to eight seats today.

There are currently eight sitting members of parliament representing Van, one of which is from the governing party. Van was a district where the pro-Kurdish Peace and Democracy Party (BDP) ran independent candidates in an attempt to overcome the 10 percent national electoral threshold. Four independent candidates were elected here in 2011; two have since joined the BDP.

MPs for Van since 1999
Seat	1999 (21st parliament)	2002 (22nd parliament)	2007 (23rd parliament)	2011 (24th parliament)	June 2015 (25th parliament)
MP	Hüseyin Çelik; DYP	Hüseyin Çelik; AK Party		Burhan Kayatürk; AK Party	
MP	Fetullah Gültepe; DYP	Cüneyt Karabıyık; AK Party	Gülşen Orhan; AK Party		Figen Yüksekdağ Şenoğlu; HDP
MP	Fethullah Erbaş; Virtue	Hacı Biner; AK Party	İkram Dinçer; AK Party	Fatih Çiftçi; AK Party	Yurdusev Özsökmenler; HDP
MP	Maliki Ejder Arvas; Virtue	Maliki Ejder Arvas; AK Party	Kerem Altun; AK Party	Mustafa Bilicir; AK Party	Adem Özcaner; HDP
MP	Mustafa Bayram; Virtue	Asuman Yekta Haydaroğlu; AK Party	Kayhan Türkmenoğlu; AK Party	Kemal Aktaş; Independent	Tuğba Hezer Öztürk; HDP
MP	Kamran İnan; Motherland	Halil Kaya; AK Party	Fatma Kurtulan; Independent	Aysel Tuğluk; Independent	Selami Özyaşar; HDP
MP	Ayhan Çevik; MHP	Mehmet Kartal; CHP	Özdal Üçer; Independent (DTP/BDP)		Remzi Özgökçe; HDP
MP	No seat			Nazmi Gür; Independent (BDP)	Lezgin Botan; HDP

== General elections ==
=== 2011 ===
Elected candidates in bold

2011 Turkish general election: Van
List	Candidates	Votes	Of total (%)	± from prev.
AK Party	**Burhan Kayatürk**, **Fatih Çiftçi**, **Mustafa Bilici**, **Gülşen Orhan**; Zahir Soğanda, Abdulahat Arvas, Necat Görentaş, Hasan Karadaş	171,665	40.26	
Independent	**Kemal Aktaş**	65,447	15.35	
Independent	**Özdal Üçer**	51,357	12.04	
Independent	**Aysel Tuğluk**	49.339	11.57	
Independent	**Nazmi Gür**	41,212	9.67	
CHP	Zahir Kandaşoğlu, Mehmet Acar, Abdulbari Melek, Selim Karakuş, Sabriye Çabuker, Şahin Efendioğlu, Nurettin Erörs, Niyazi Çınak	15,945	3.74	
MHP	Mustafa Kaçmaz, Ahmet Erbaş, Ümit Akdağ, Mustafa Alkoç, Ali Özturan, Turgent Lenk, Yüksel Hanalap, Mehmet Emin İnce	12,734	2.99	
Büyük Birlik	None elected	5306	1.24	
Other independents	Mustafa Sancak, Muhammed Ferhat Kesmez, İdris Ahi, Süleyman Bayram	3974	0.93	
SAADET	None elected	1856	0.44	
HAS Party	None elected	1,734	0.41	N/A
DP	None elected	1706	0.4	
TKP	None elected	1549	0.36	
DSP	None elected	1257	0.29	'"`UNIQ−−ref−0000000D−QINU`"'
Liberal Democrat	None elected	482	0.11	
Nationalist Conservative	None elected	465	0.11	
MP	None elected	345	0.08	
DYP	None elected	18	0	
HEPAR	None elected	11	0	
Labour	None elected	0		
Turnout		222,977	91.55	

=== June 2015 ===
Abbr.	Party	Votes	%
HDP	**Peoples' Democratic Party**	**368,522**	**74.8%**
AK Party	Justice and Development Party	95,480	19.4%
MHP	Nationalist Movement Party	13,329	2.7%
Hüda-Par	Free Cause Party	3,093	0.6%
CHP	Republican People's Party	2,340	0.5%
	Other	9,818	2%
Total		492,582	
Turnout		84.49	
source: YSK

=== November 2015 ===
Abbr.	Party	Votes	%
HDP	**Peoples' Democratic Party**	**310,794**	**65.5%**
AK Party	Justice and Development Party	142,436	30%
MHP	Nationalist Movement Party	5,417	1.1%
CHP	Republican People's Party	6,946	1.5%
	Other	8,659	1.8%
Total		474,252	
Turnout		81.12	
source: YSK

=== 2018 ===
Abbr.	Party	Votes	%
HDP	**Peoples' Democratic Party**	**310,273**	**60.6%**
AK Party	Justice and Development Party	157,637	30.8%
MHP	Nationalist Movement Party	14,798	2.9%
CHP	Republican People's Party	10,946	2.1%
IYI	Good Party	5,992	1.2%
HÜDA-PAR	Free Cause Party	4,753	0.9%
SP	Felicity Party	4,031	0.8%
	Other	3,429	0.7%
Total		511,859	
Turnout		83.06	
source: YSK

== Presidential elections ==
=== 2014 ===
Presidential Election 2014: Van
Party	Candidate	Votes	%
HDP	Selahattin Demirtaş	223,277	54.55
AK Party	Recep Tayyip Erdoğan	174,369	42.60
Independent	Ekmeleddin İhsanoğlu	11,685	2.85
Total votes		409,331	100.00
Rejected ballots		7,564	1.81
Turnout		416,895	71.89
Selahattin Demirtaş win			
