= Naci Bostancı =

Turkish politician and academic (born 1957)

Naci Bostancı MP
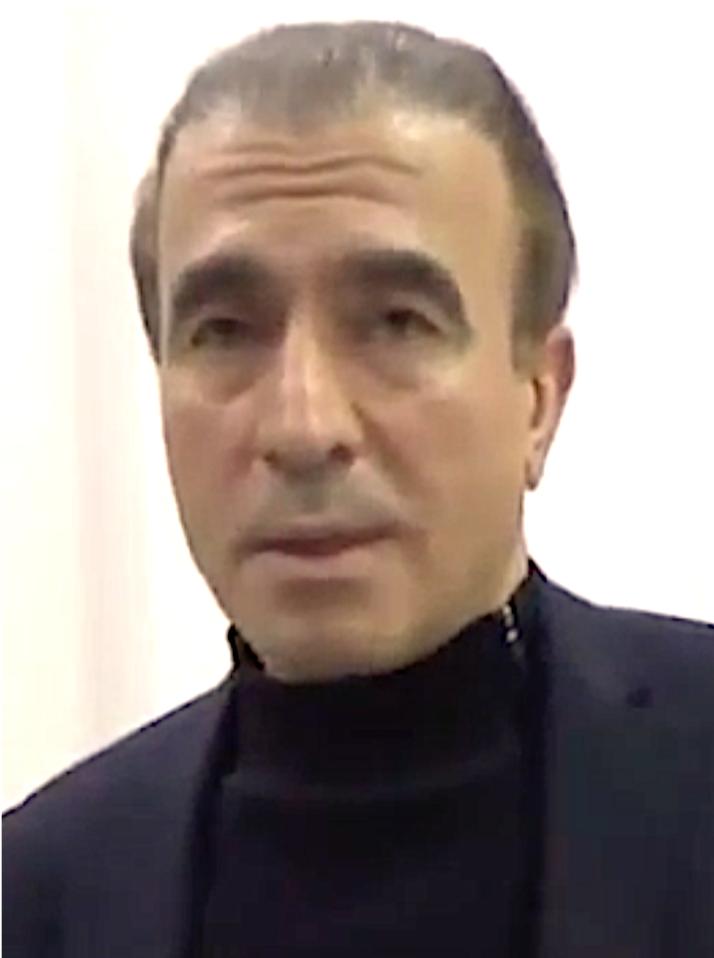

Leader of the House
- In office 7 July 2018 – 17 November 2021
- Leader: Recep Tayyip Erdoğan
- Preceded by: Binali Yıldırım
- Succeeded by: İsmet Yılmaz

Deputy Speaker of the Grand National Assembly
- In office 9 July 2015 – 1 November 2015
- Speaker: İsmet Yılmaz
- Serving with: Şafak Pavey; Koray Aydın; Yurdusev Özsökmenler
- Preceded by: Sadık Yakut
- Succeeded by: Ahmet Aydın

Parliamentary group leader of the Justice and Development Party
- In office 1 September 2014 – 9 July 2015
- Leader: Ahmet Davutoğlu
- Serving with: Mustafa Elitaş; Mahir Ünal; Belma Satır; Ahmet Aydın
- Preceded by: Nurettin Canikli
- Succeeded by: Doğan Kubat

Member of the Grand National Assembly
- Incumbent
- Assumed office 8 July 2018
- Constituency: Ankara (III) (2018)
- In office 12 June 2011 – 7 July 2018
- Constituency: Amasya (2011, June 2015, Nov 2015)

Personal details
- Born: Mehmet Naci Bostancı; 2 August 1957 (age 69) Amasya, Turkey
- Party: Justice and Development Party
- Education: Ankara University
- Website: Personal website

Mehmet Naci Bostancı (born 2 August 1957) is a Turkish politician and academic who currently serves as the Deputy Speaker of the Grand National Assembly along with Şafak Pavey, Koray Aydın and Yurdusev Özsökmenler as of 9 July 2015. He was formerly one of the five parliamentary group leaders of the Justice and Development Party (AKP), having served as an AKP Member of Parliament for the electoral district of Amasya since the 2011 Turkish general election.

== Early life and career ==
Mehmet Naci Bostancı was born in Amasya on 2 August 1957 and graduated from Ankara University Faculty of Political Science in 1980. He did a Master's degree and a Doctorate at Istanbul University Institute of Social Sciences. He worked as a columnist for the Türkiye Günlüğü and Birikim magazines as well as the Zaman newspaper.

=== Academic career ===
Bostancı became the chief advisor to the Rector of Gazi University, Rıza Ayhan and later became the head of the Public Relations and Presentation branch of Gazi University's Faculty of Communications, serving between 1998 and 2004. On 11 March 2009, he became the Dean of the Gazi University Faculty of Communications, serving until 10 March 2011. He resigned from his position to contest the 2011 general election.

== Political career ==
Bostancı had previously served as the political advisor to the former leader of the Motherland Party (ANAP), Mesut Yılmaz. Between 1989 and 1991, he was the Undersecretary to the Ministry of Culture and Tourism. He was the President and later the Secretary General of the Turkey-Kyrgyzstan interparliamentary friendship group. He was also a member of the Turkey-Ireland interparliamentary friendship group. On 8 January 2014, he became the President of the Parliamentary Commission on National Education, Culture, Youth and Sports. With serving parliamentary group leader Nurettin Canikli becoming the Minister of Customs and Trade in the Government of Ahmet Davutoğlu, Bostancı was elected in his place with 263 out of 265 votes (with 2 blank votes).

He was re-elected from Amasya in the June 2015 general election and was selected as the AKP Deputy Speaker of the Grand National Assembly on 9 July 2015.

== See also ==
- İsmet Yılmaz
- Ahmet Aydın
