= Koray Aydın =

Turkish politician (born 1955)

Koray Aydın MP
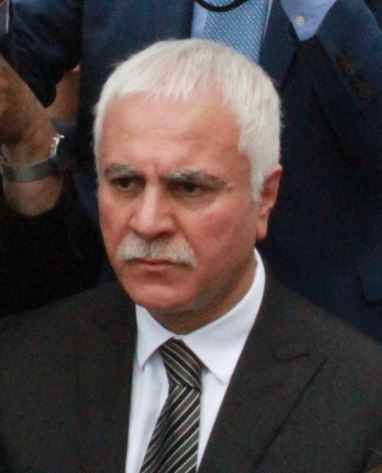
- Koray Aydın in 2016 while a member of the Nationalist Movement Party (MHP)

Deputy Speaker of the Grand National Assembly
- In office 9 July 2015 – 17 November 2015
- Speaker: İsmet Yılmaz
- Serving with: Naci Bostancı; Şafak Pavey; Yurdusev Özsökmenler
- Preceded by: Meral Akşener
- Succeeded by: Ayşe Nur Bahçekapılı

Minister of Public Works and Housing
- In office 28 May 1999 – 5 September 2001
- Prime Minister: Bülent Ecevit
- Preceded by: Ali Ilıksoy
- Succeeded by: Abdülkadir Akcan

Member of the Grand National Assembly
- Incumbent
- Assumed office 8 July 2018
- Constituency: Ankara (I) (2018, 2023)
- In office 12 June 2011 – 1 November 2015
- Constituency: Trabzon (2011, June 2015)
- In office 18 April 1999 – 3 November 2002
- Constituency: Ankara (1999)
- In office 20 October 1991 – 24 December 1995
- Constituency: Trabzon (1991)

Personal details
- Born: 5 December 1955 (age 70) Trabzon, Turkey
- Party: Nationalist Task Party (MÇP) (1991-1993); Nationalist Movement Party (MHP) (1993-2017); Good Party (İYİ) (2017–2024); Independent (2024-present)
- Education: Karadeniz Technical University
- Website: www.korayaydin.com

Koray Aydın (born 5 December 1955) is a Turkish politician who has been serving as the Deputy Speaker of the Grand National Assembly since 9 July 2015. He previously served as the Minister of Public Works and Housing during the 57th government of Turkey led by Prime Minister Bülent Ecevit. As a politician from the Nationalist Movement Party (MHP), he served as the party's General Secretary. He served as a Member of Parliament for Trabzon from 1991 to 1995, as an MP for Ankara from 1999 to 2002 and again from Trabzon from 2011 to November 2015.

He lost his seat in the November 2015 general election. In 2017, he left the MHP and joined the Good Party, founded by Meral Akşener. He left the Good Party in 2024.

== Early life and career ==
Koray Aydın was born on 5 December 1955 in Trabzon. Due to his father's job as a state official, he completed his primary and secondary education in different parts of Anatolia before graduating from Karadeniz Technical University Faculty of Mechanical Engineering in 1978. He is married with three children.

== Political career ==
=== Nationalist movement ===
Aydın became involved in politics at a young age, first becoming a member of the Executive Board of the Nationalist Movement Party (MHP) Trabzon Youth Wing. He later became the President of the Trabzon Youth Wing. He was actively involved in campaigning efforts during the 1977 general election.

After the political bans imposed in the 1980 Turkish coup d'état were lifted, Aydın was involved in the establishment of the Conservative Party. The Conservatives later renamed themselves and became the Nationalist Workers Party (MÇP), with Aydın being elected as an MÇP MP for Trabzon in the 1991 general election. Aydın was also a member of the MÇP Central Executive Committee, served as the party's deputy accountant and also later deputy secretary general. As an MP, he served on the Parliamentary Commission on Planning and the Budget. With the MÇP being renamed and becoming the Nationalist Movement Party, Aydın was unable to retain his seat in the 1995 general election after the MHP fell below the 10% election threshold needed to win parliamentary representation. He became the MHP's General Secretary in 1995.

=== Minister of Public Works and Housing ===
Aydın became the Minister of Public Works and Housing in the triple coalition government formed by the Democratic Left Party (DSP), the Motherland Party (ANAP) and the MHP. As Minister, Aydın dealt with the aftermath of the 1999 İzmit earthquake and the 1999 Düzce earthquake, with several new housing developments being built for victims left homeless after the earthquakes. He left his position as Minister on 5 September 2001 and lost his seat in the 2002 as the MHP once again fell below the 10% election threshold and lost all its parliamentary representation.

Parliamentary investigations began into Aydın's tenure as Minister in 2005, with Aydın being accused of crimes including illegally acquiring assets, jobbery and bid rigging. With a total of 45 different cases filed against him, prosecutors pushed for a 216 years and 6 months jail sentence. The claims were declared to be unfounded and all charges were subsequently dropped in 2007. Aydın expressed his wish to continue in politics.

=== MHP leadership bid ===
Aydın was re-elected as an MP from Trabzon at the 2011 general election. During the 10th MHP Ordinary Congress held on 4 November 2012, Aydın put his name forward to run for the party leadership against incumbent Devlet Bahçeli. Bahçeli was re-elected as leader with 725 votes out of 1,214 delegates, with Aydın coming second with 441 votes. Although Aydın failed to win, his significant vote share and its proximity to Bahçeli's votes was seen as a sign of a strengthening inner-party opposition to Bahçeli's leadership.

=== Deputy Speaker ===
Aydın was re-elected as an MP in the June 2015 general election and was selected as the MHP's candidate to become one of the four Deputy Speakers of the Grand National Assembly, along with the Justice and Development Party's nominee Naci Bostancı, the Republican People's Party's nominee Şafak Pavey and the Peoples' Democratic Party's nominee Yurdusev Özsökmenler. Aydın took office on 9 July 2015. His selection as the MHP's Deputy Speaker was criticised since many commentators were expecting the MHP to re-nominate Meral Akşener, who had served as the MHP's Deputy Speaker for the previous two parliaments.

== See also ==
- Alparslan Türkeş
- 57th government of Turkey
- 2016 Nationalist Movement Party Extraordinary Congress
