= Ahmet Aydın =

Turkish politician (born 1971)

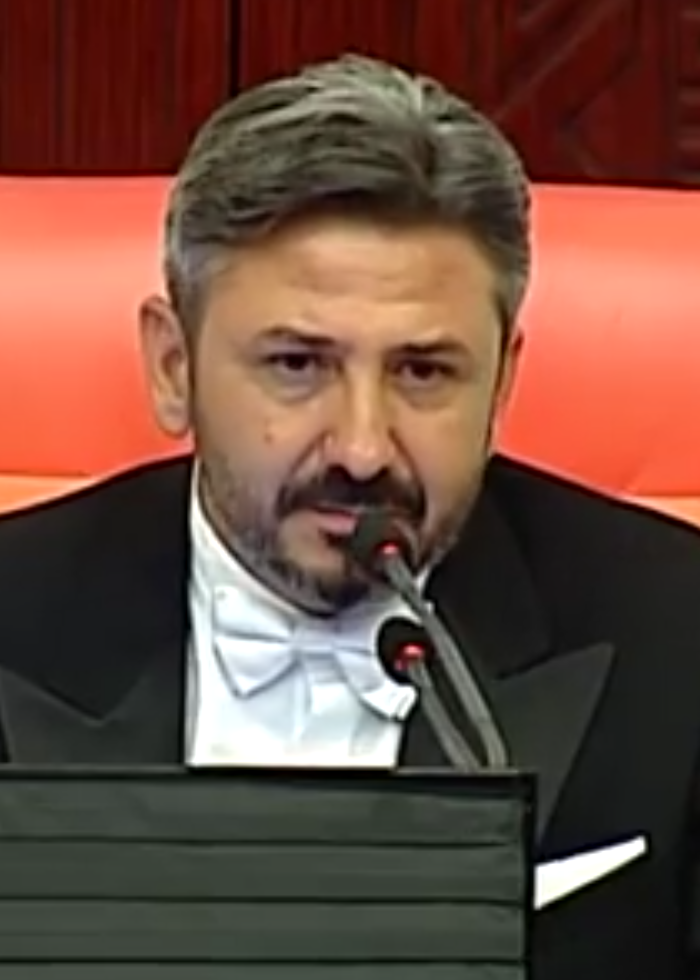

Deputy Speaker of the Grand National Assembly
- In office 24 November 2015 – 7 July 2018
- Speaker: İsmail Kahraman
- Serving with: Ayşe Nur Bahçekapılı; Akif Hamzaçebi (2015-17); Yaşar Tüzün (2017-18); Pervin Buldan (2015-18); Mithat Sancar (2018)
- Preceded by: Naci Bostancı
- Succeeded by: Mustafa Şentop

Member of the Grand National Assembly
- In office 22 July 2007 – 14 May 2023
- Constituency: Adıyaman (2007, 2011, June 2015, Nov 2015, 2018)

Personal details
- Born: 1 March 1971 (age 55) Kahta, Adıyaman, Turkey
- Party: Justice and Development Party (AKP)
- Education: Istanbul University
- Occupation: Politician
- Profession: Lawyer

Ahmet Aydın (born 1 March 1971) is a Turkish politician of Kurdish origin from the Justice and Development Party (AKP), who served as a Member of Parliament for Adıyaman from 22 July 2007 to 14 May 2023.

Born in the district of Kahta, Adıyaman, he graduated from Istanbul University Faculty of Law and received further education at Marmara University. He worked as a freelance lawyer and also as a radiology technician at state hospitals. Married and able to speak semi-fluent English, he was elected as an AKP Member of Parliament in the 2007 general election and was re-elected in 2011, June 2015, November 2015 and 2018.

== See also ==
- 23rd Parliament of Turkey
- 24th Parliament of Turkey
- 25th Parliament of Turkey
- 26th Parliament of Turkey
