= Kaçmaz =

Kaçmaz is a Turkish surname. Notable people with the name include:

- Ahmet Kaçmaz (1938–2021), Turkish politician
- Akgün Kaçmaz (1935–2023), Turkish football player
- Begüm Kaçmaz (born 2007), Turkish female volleyball player
- Gülcan Kaçmaz Sayyiğit (born 1982), Turkish female politician
- Hüseyin Kaçmaz (born 1986), Turkish politician, M.P.

== See also ==
- Xaçmaz (disambiguation)
