= Military budget of Turkey =

Military budget of Turkey, Turkey’s military budget is at 100.4 billion Turkish liras, or $25.3 billion, former Turkish Defense Minister İsmet Yılmaz said 8 November 2014. He was responding to a question from an opposition party leader, the Nationalist Movement Party’s Ankara deputy Özcan Yeniçeri, who asked how much Turkey had spent on its defense budget since 2002. Yılmaz said Turkey spent about 1.71 percent of its gross domestic product, or the GDP on defense in 2014. Turkey used to spend 3.5 percent of its GDP on defense in 2002.

According to the minister, Turkey’s military expenditure per capita in 2013 was 474 Turkish liras or $213. He also said Turkey’s defense exports stood at $1.4 billion in 2014, while its imports amounted to $1.3 billion. The 2014 defense budget accounted for 3.7 percent of the overall state budget. About half of the country’s defense budget went to personnel spending such as salaries, benefits and pension payments to retired Turkish Army personnel.

== Comparison with other countries ==
Absolute expenditures in USD
Country/Region	Official budget (latest)	SIPRI (2012)	IHS Inc. (2013)	IISS (2013)
United States	$816 billion	$682.5 billion	$582.4 billion	$600.4 billion
United Kingdom	$45.9 billion	$60.8 billion	$58.9 billion	$57 billion
Japan	$47 billion	$59.3 billion	$56.8 billion	$51 billion
People's Republic of China (PRC)	$131 billion	$166.1 billion	$139.2 billion	$112.2 billion
Russian Federation	$84 billion	$90.7 billion	$68.9 billion	$68.2 billion
