= Governor of İzmir =

Governor of a Turkish Province

Governor of İzmir İzmir Valiliği

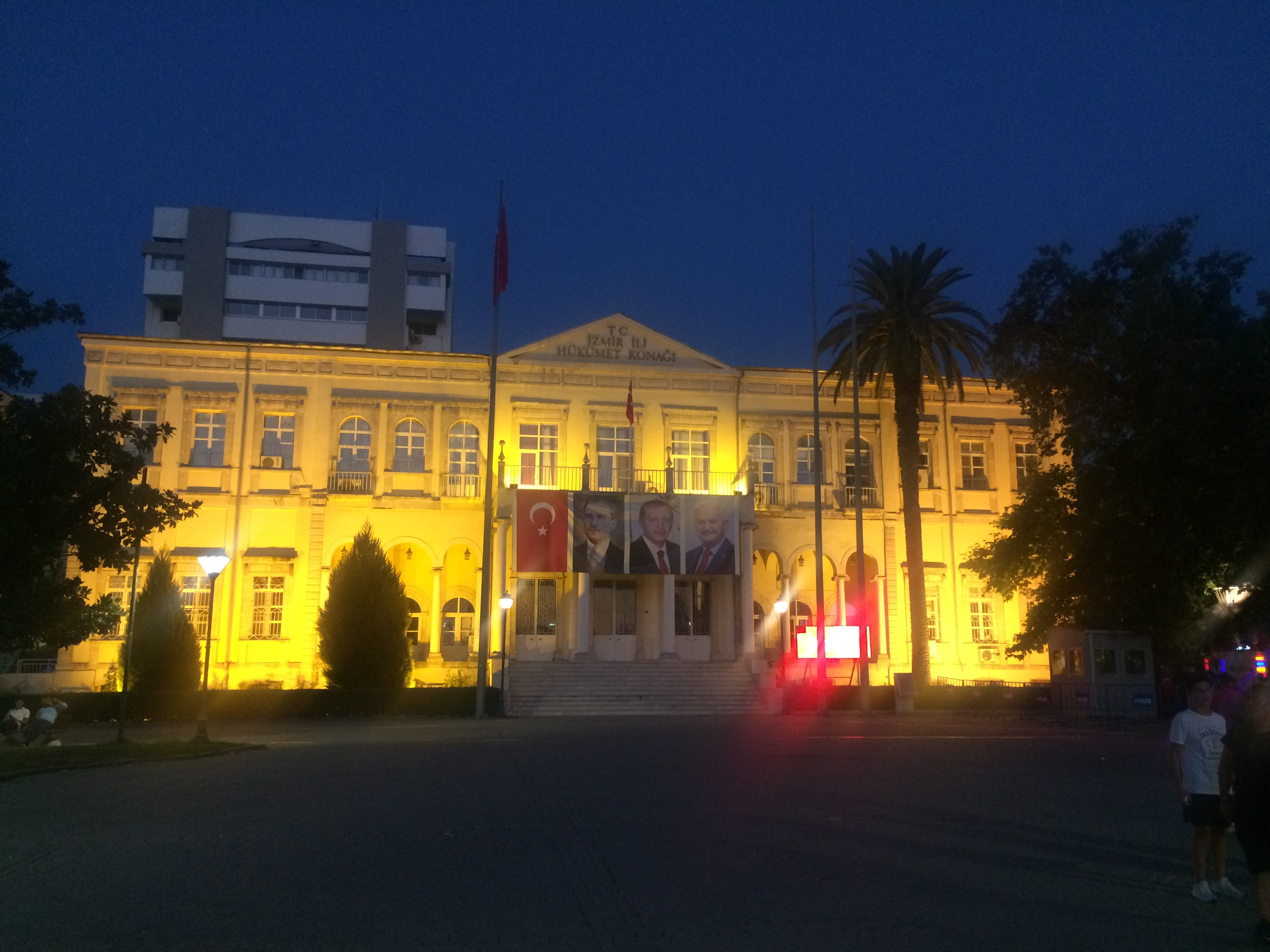
- Incumbent; Süleyman Elban since August 18, 2023
- Appointer: President of Turkey; On the recommendation of the Turkish government
- Term length: No set term length or limit
- Inaugural holder: Ferit Paşa; February 7, 1909
- Website: Office of the Governor

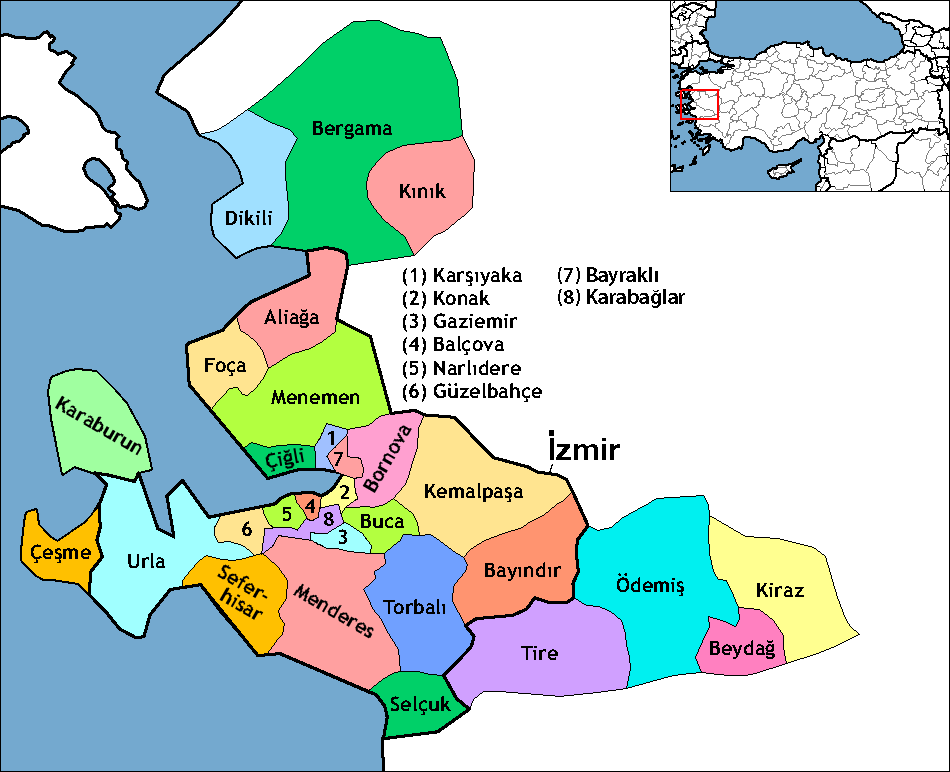
Map of the province of İzmir, showing the provincial districts.

The governor of İzmir (Turkish: İzmir Valiliği) is the bureaucratic state official responsible for both national government and state affairs in the province of İzmir. Similar to the governors of the 80 other provinces of Turkey, the governor of İzmir is appointed by the government of Turkey and is responsible for the implementation of government legislation within İzmir. The governor is also the most senior commander of both the İzmir provincial police force and the İzmir Gendarmerie.

== Appointment ==
The governor of İzmir is appointed by the president of Turkey, who confirms the appointment after recommendation from the Turkish government. The Ministry of the Interior first considers and puts forward possible candidates for approval by the cabinet. The governor of İzmir is therefore not a directly elected position and instead functions as the most senior civil servant in the Province of İzmir.

=== Term limits ===
The governor is not limited by any term limits and does not serve for a set length of time. Instead, the governor serves at the pleasure of the government, which can appoint or reposition the governor whenever it sees fit. Such decisions are again made by the cabinet of Turkey. The governor of İzmir, as a civil servant, may not have any close connections or prior experience in İzmir Province. It is not unusual for governors to alternate between several different provinces during their bureaucratic career.

== Functions ==
The governor of İzmir has both bureaucratic functions and influence over local government. The main role of the governor is to oversee the implementation of decisions by government ministries, constitutional requirements and legislation passed by Grand National Assembly within the provincial borders. The governor also has the power to reassign, remove or appoint officials a certain number of public offices and has the right to alter the role of certain public institutions if they see fit. Governors are also the most senior public official within the province, meaning that they preside over any public ceremonies or provincial celebrations being held due to a national holiday. As the commander of the provincial police and Gendarmerie forces, the governor can also take decisions designed to limit civil disobedience and preserve public order. Although mayors of municipalities and councillors are elected during local elections, the governor has the right to re-organise or to inspect the proceedings of local government despite being an unelected position.

== List of governors of İzmir ==
Governors of İzmir
No.	Name	Took office	Left office
1	Ferit Paşa	7 February 1909	2 May 1909
2	Kazım Paşa	2 May 1909	17 September 1909
3	M. Muhtar Paşa	17 September 1909	2 October 1910
4	N. Nazım Paşa	16 October 1910	21 January 1911
5	Ahmet Reşit Bey	18 August 1912	17 October 1912
(4)	N. Nazım Paşa	23 January 1913	19 September 1913
6	Rahmi Arslan	29 September 1913	13 October 1917
7	H. Tahsin Uzer	9 January 1918	28 November 1918
8	Nurettin Paşa	26 January 1919	22 March 1919
9	Ahmet İzzet Bey	23 March 1919	...............
10	Cavit Bey	1 May 1920	26 September 1920
11	Macit Bey	26 September 1920	...............
12	Mustafa Abdülhalik Renda	11 September 1922	8 August 1923
13	Hüseyin Aziz Akyürek	28 August 1923	21 July 1924
14	Kazım Dirik	27 March 1926	7 August 1935
15	Fazlı Güleç	9 August 1935	17 March 1939
16	İbrahim Etem Aykut	29 May 1939	3 June 1940
17	Fuat Tuksal	5 August 1940	23 May 1942
18	Mustafa Sabri Öney	3 July 1942	28 December 1943
19	Şefik Refik Soyer	26 January 1944	31 January 1948
20	Osman Sabri Adal	19 February 1948	30 November 1951
21	Muzaffer Tuğsavul	28 January 1952	15 May 1952
(20)	Osman Sabri Adal	16 June 1952	6 September 1952
22	Muzaffer Göksenin	7 September 1953	2 October 1954
23	Kemal Hadımlı	16 December 1954	27 May 1960
24	Burhanettin Uluç	11 June 1960	7 November 1961
25	Enver Saatçıgil	17 March 1962	20 June 1964
26	Niyazi Dalokay	20 June 1964	8 September 1964
27	Namık Kemal Şentürk	4 December 1964	22 June 1973
28	Mehmet Raşit Bilgegörün	23 June 1973	15 December 1974
29	Orhan Erbuğ	16 December 1974	2 July 1975
30	Mustafa Uygur	15 July 1975	8 December 1975
31	Turgut Eğilmez	6 January 1976	19 September 1977
32	Necdet Calp	11 February 1978	11 December 1979
33	Nazmi Çengelci	11 December 1979	8 January 1981
34	Hüseyin Öğütçen	8 January 1981	10 February 1984
35	Vecdi Gönül	13 February 1984	11 January 1988
36	Nevzat Ayaz	23 January 1988	17 October 1989
37	Kutlu Aktaş	21 April 1990	23 July 1997
38	Erol Çakır	24 July 1997	13 August 1998
39	Kemal Nehrozoğlu	14 August 1998	30 May 2000
40	Alaaddin Yüksel	9 August 2000	17 February 2003
41	Yusuf Ziya Göksu	19 February 2003	16 July 2005
42	Oğuz Kağan Köksal	29 July 2005	9 March 2007
43	Mustafa Cahit Kıraç	20 March 2007	21 May 2013
44	Mustafa Toprak	31 May 2013	10 June 2016
45	Erol Ayyıldız	10 June 2016	18 June 2020
46	Yavuz Selim Köşger	9 June 2020	18 August 2023
47	Süleyman Elban	18 August 2023	Incumbent

== See also ==
- Governor (Turkey)
- İzmir Province
- Ministry of the Interior (Turkey)
- List of mayors of İzmir
