= Zülküf Uçar =

Zülküf Uçar (1982, Van, Turkey) is a lawyer, President of the Van Bar Association and a politician of the Green Left Party (YSP). In May 2023, he was elected to the Grand National Assembly of Turkey.

== Personal life and education ==
Zülküf Uçar was born in Van, where he also attended primary and high school. Uçar then enrolled into the Dokuz Eylül University in Izmir to study law. Following his graduation, he worked as a lawyer in Van from 2007. He is married since 2017.

== Professional career ==
As a lawyer he was involved in cases dealing with human rights violations and torture. He became a member of the board of the Van Bar Association in 2012 and between 2018 and 2022 he was its president. As the president of the Van Bar Association he refused to attend a ceremony marking the beginning of a new judicial year in the Presidential Palace in 2019, together with the majority of the lawyers in Turkey and took part in the march of lawyers against a change of the electoral system in Bar Associations in June 2020. In October 2021, he defended the right of manifestation and opposed the ban on manifestations imposed after the failed attempted coup d'état in 2016. In the parliamentary elections of May 2023, he was elected to the Grand National Assembly of Turkey, representing Van for the YSP.
