= Haydarpaşa High School =

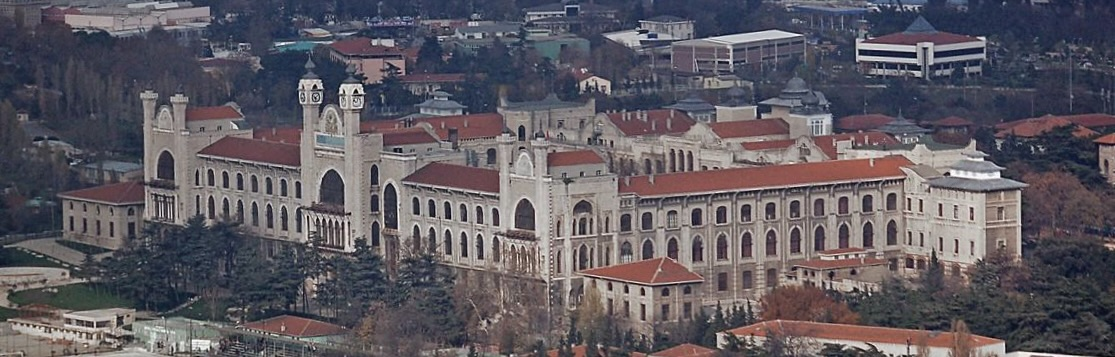
- Former Haydarpaşa High School building
- Koşuyolu, formerly Haydarpaşa; Üsküdar, Istanbul; Turkey

Information
- Type: Anatolian High School
- Founded: September 26, 1934; 91 years ago
- Founder: Mustafa Kemal Atatürk
- Principal: Muzaffer Güneş
- Enrollment: 809
- Website: haydarpasalisesi.meb.k12.tr

Haydarpaşa High School (Turkish: Haydarpaşa Lisesi) is an Anatolian high school in Üsküdar district of Istanbul, Turkey established in 1934.

== History ==
Founded by Mustafa Kemal Atatürk on September 26, 1934, the school initially operated as a boys' boarding and day school. It began admitting female students at the start of the 1948/49 academic term, transitioning to coeducational learning. This mixed-sex education format was briefly discontinued after the 1958/59 term but resumed in the 1980/81 term. The boarding facilities were closed in the 1979/80 term, and the space was repurposed for Marmara University Medical School. In July 1984, the high school vacated its historic building permanently. It was temporarily housed in an annex of Haydarpaşa Industrial Vocational High School until 1990. In February 1989, the school relocated to its own building in the Altunizade neighborhood of Üsküdar. In the 1998/99 term, it was designated as an Anatolian High School (Turkish: Anadolu Lisesi), which enrolls students based on higher standardized test scores and offers education in a foreign language. On June 26, 2016, the Ministry of National Education granted it "Project School" status.

== Initial building ==
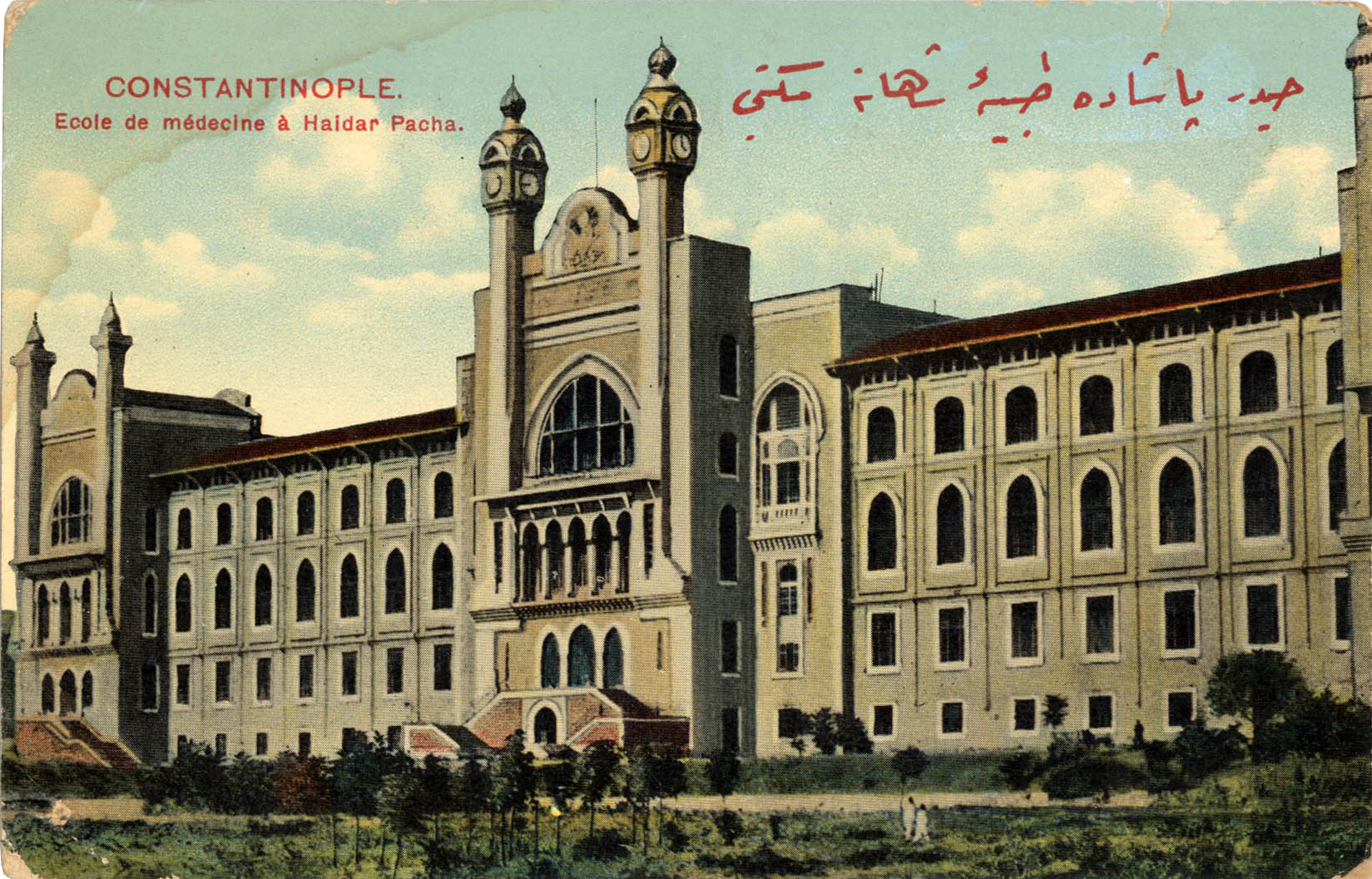
Historic photography of the building's southwest facade.

Haydarpaşa High School housed in a monumental historic building from its establishment in 1934 until July 1984. The building was commissioned by Ottoman Sultan Abdul Hamid II (reigned 1876–1909) for use as the "Imperial Medicine School" (Ottoman Turkish: Mekteb-i Tıbbiye-i Şahane). It was designed by the French-Ottoman architect Alexander Vallaury (1850–1921) and the Italian architect Raimondo Tommaso D'Aronco (1857–1932). The construction began on February 11, 1895, and was completed in 1900. It was situated in the area between the 1828-built Selimiye Barracks and the Haydarpaşa Military Hospital. The ceremonial opening took place on the birthday of the sultan on 15 Sha'ban AH 1321 (November 6, 1903).

The building, built on an 80,000 m^{2} (860,000 sq ft) land, has a rectangular plan. It has a construction area of 24,000 m^{2} (260,000 sq ft) with a courtyard of 80 m × 140 m (260 ft × 460 ft) inside. It is a two-story building with a basement. Aisles run on two floors of the building around the courtyard, and classrooms were situated at the outer sections in the south, west and north wings. The walls of the building were covered with granite plates brought from quarries in Hereke and Bilecik. Hydraulic lime, imported from Marseille, France, was used as lime mortar.

After merging of the civilian and military medicine education, the building became Haydarpaşa Faculty of Medicine in 1909. The Faculty of Medicine moved to the European part of Istanbul after the 1933 University Reform. The building was handed over to the Ministry of National Education. It served half a century as Haydarpaşa High School between 1934 and 1984. It became then Marmara University's Faculty of Medicine Haydarpaşa Campus.

== Notable alumni ==
- Mehmet Ağar (born 1951) — Former Minister of Interior, Minister of Justice and chief of the General Directorate of Security
- Mahir Çayan (1946–1972) — Marxist–Leninist revolutionary leader
- Yavuz Çetin (1970–2001) — Musician, songwriter and singer
- Halil Ergün (born 1946) — Actor
- Deniz Gezmiş (1947–1972) — Marxist–Leninist revolutionary leader
- Kadir İnanır (born 1949) — Actor and director
- Erkin Koray (1941–2023) — Guitarist, singer-songwriter
- Tuncel Kurtiz (1936–2013) — Actor
- Osman Pepe (born 1954) — Former Minister of Environment and Forestry
- Zeki Ökten (1941–2009) — Film director
- Niyazi Sayın (born 1927) — Musician
- Cemal Süreya (1931–1990) — Poet and writer
- Cengiz Topel (1934–1964) — Fighter pilot of the Turkish Air Force
- Cavit Orhan Tütengil, (1921–1979) — Sociologist and columnist
- İsmet Yılmaz (born 1961) — 26th Speaker of the Parliament of Turkey
