= Vecdi Gönül =

Turkish politician (born 1939)

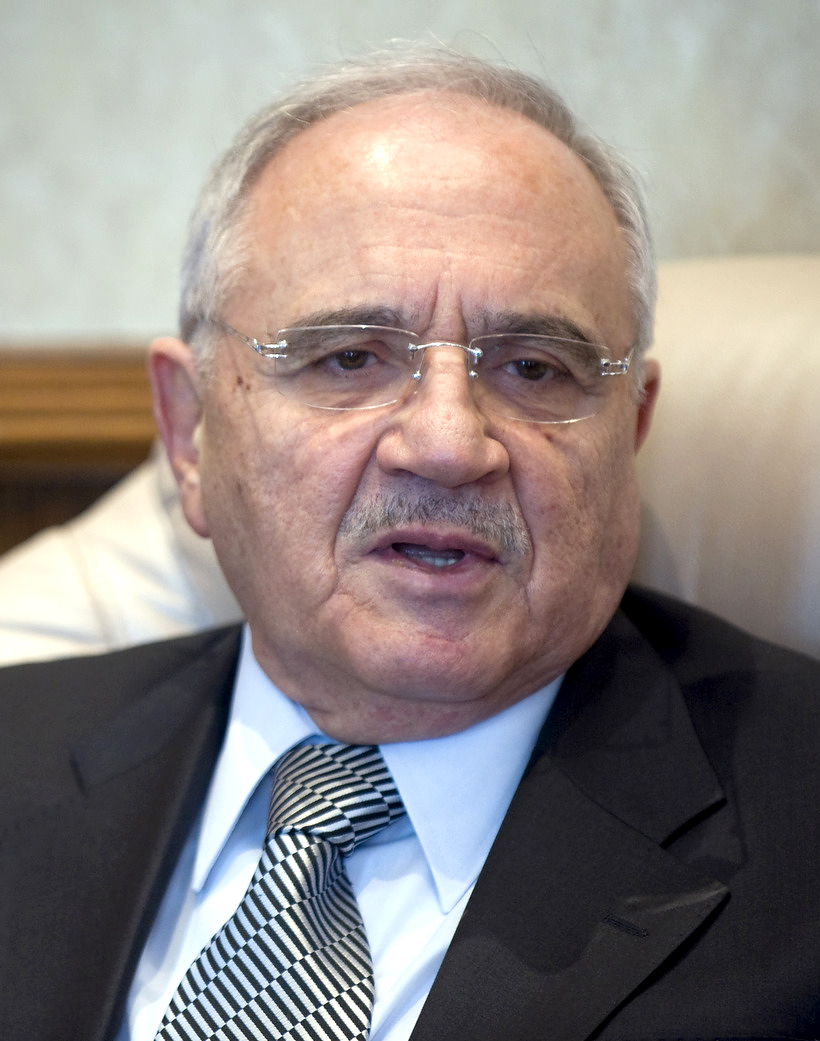

Minister of National Defense
- In office 3 July 2015 – 17 November 2015
- Prime Minister: Ahmet Davutoğlu
- Preceded by: İsmet Yılmaz
- Succeeded by: İsmet Yılmaz
- In office 3 November 2001 – 6 July 2011
- Prime Minister: Abdullah Gül; Recep Tayyip Erdoğan
- Preceded by: Sabahattin Çakmakoğlu
- Succeeded by: İsmet Yılmaz

Member of the Grand National Assembly
- In office 18 April 1999 – 7 June 2015
- Constituency: Kocaeli (1999, 2002); İzmir (II) (2007); Antalya (2011)

Governor of İzmir
- In office 10 February 1984 – 11 January 1988
- President: Kenan Evren
- Preceded by: Hüseyin Öğütçen
- Succeeded by: Nevzat Ayaz

Governor of Ankara
- In office 15 December 1979 – 27 October 1980
- President: Fahri Korutürk; Kenan Evren
- Preceded by: Tekin Alp
- Succeeded by: Mustafa Gönül

Personal details
- Born: 29 November 1939 (age 86) Erzincan, Turkey
- Party: AK Party (de facto); Independent (de jure)
- Spouse: Sevgi Gönül
- Education: Ankara University; University of Southern California
- Cabinet: 58th, 59th, 60th, 62nd, 63rd

Mehmet Vecdi Gönül (pronounced [vedʒdi ˈɟœnyl]; born 29 November 1939) is a Turkish politician who served as the Minister of National Defense from 3 July to 17 November 2015. He previously served in the same position from 2002 to 2011 and was a member of the Parliament from 1999 to 2015.

Gönül first entered Parliament following the 1999 general election for Kocaeli from the Islamist Virtue Party (FP). He joined the Justice and Development Party (AKP) in 2001 when the FP was shut down and was re-elected as an AKP MP from Kocaeli in the 2002 general election. He became minister of national defence in the government of Abdullah Gül and continued in his position when Recep Tayyip Erdoğan took over as prime minister in March 2003. He was re-elected as an MP, this time from İzmir's second electoral district, in the 2007 general election and again from Antalya in 2011. In Erdoğan's third cabinet, he was succeeded as national defense minister by İsmet Yılmaz.

Due to the AKP's three term limit, Gönül stepped down from Parliament at the June 2015 general election. After serving national defense minister İsmet Yılmaz was elected as Speaker of the Grand National Assembly on 1 July 2015, Gönül was re-appointed as national defense minister by Prime Minister Ahmet Davutoğlu despite not being an MP and served in the post until 17 November 2015.

== Biography ==
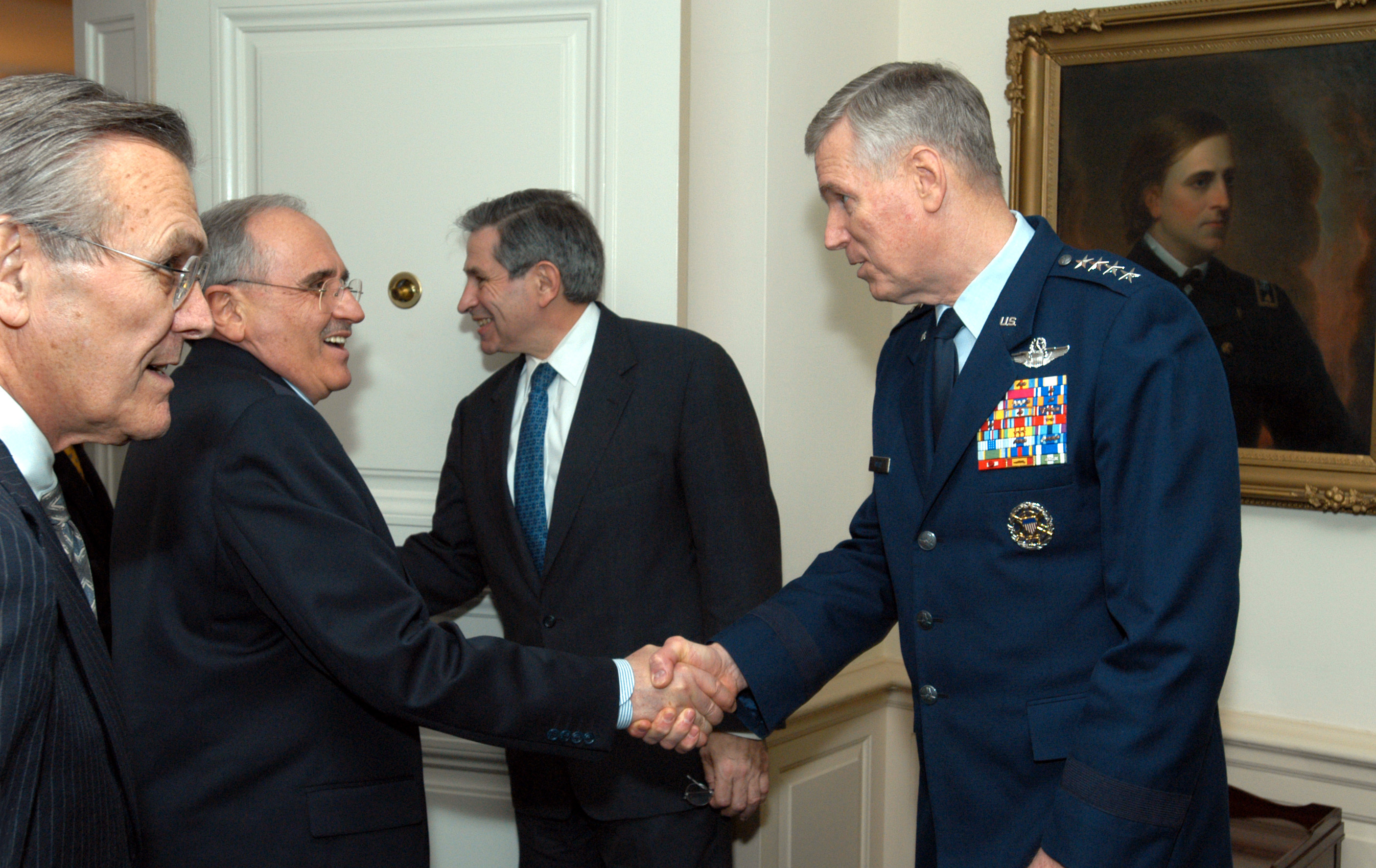
Vecdi Gonul with U.S. Chairman of the Joint Chiefs of Staff Gen. Richard B. Myers and U.S. Secretary of Defense Donald Rumsfeld during Gonul visit to The Pentagon on 18 March 2003.

Gönül was born in Erzincan. His father, Saffet, was a teacher in military high schools. His mother's name was Lütfiye. He graduated in political science from Ankara University in 1960 and returned to Erzincan as a civil servant. He completed a master's degree in Public Administration at the University of Southern California and then returned to a career in public administration in Turkey, eventually becoming Chief of the Directorate of General Security (October 1977 - February 1978) and then governor of Kocaeli, Ankara (during the 1980 Turkish coup d'état) and Istanbul provinces. In the mid-1980s he was governor of Izmir where he is remembered for a large project of road-building and the construction of Adnan Menderes Airport. Gönül eventually became president of the Public Spending Authority (Sayıştay), the country's highest authority on public finance.

Gönül was elected to the Turkish parliament for Kocaeli on 18 April 1999, and was part of the vanguard of the incumbent AKP. When Tayyip Erdoğan was barred from entering parliament, he became a candidate for party leadership, and later a candidate for the presidency.

He became Minister of National Defence on 19 November 2002, serving in that post until 6 July 2011.

Vecdi Gönül is married and has three children. He speaks English.

== Views on the Armenian genocide and population exchange with Greece ==
In 2008, Gönül stated:

If the existence of the Greek Rum in the Aegean region and of the Armenians in many regions of Turkey had continued as before, would it have been possible to maintain the same [Turkish] national state today? I do not know how to explain to you the significance of the population exchange undertaken with Greece, but its significance would become evident if one analyzes the former population balances. Even today, we cannot deny the contributions of those [Turks, Muslims] disadvantaged by those [non-Muslims] who considered themselves victimized by the deportations. The principles at the advent of the Turkish republic were extremely significant in turning Turkey into a modern, civilized, and enlightened country.

These statements were widely criticized in the Turkish press as they were interpreted as justifying the Armenian genocide and other atrocities.

Political offices
Preceded by İsmet Yılmaz	Minister of National Defence of Turkey; July 3, 2015	Succeeded by Incumbent
Preceded by Sabahattin Çakmakoğlu	Minister of National Defence of Turkey; November 18, 2002 - July 6, 2011	Succeeded by İsmet Yılmaz
