= İsmet Yılmaz =

26th Speaker of the Parliament of Turkey

İsmet Yılmaz MP
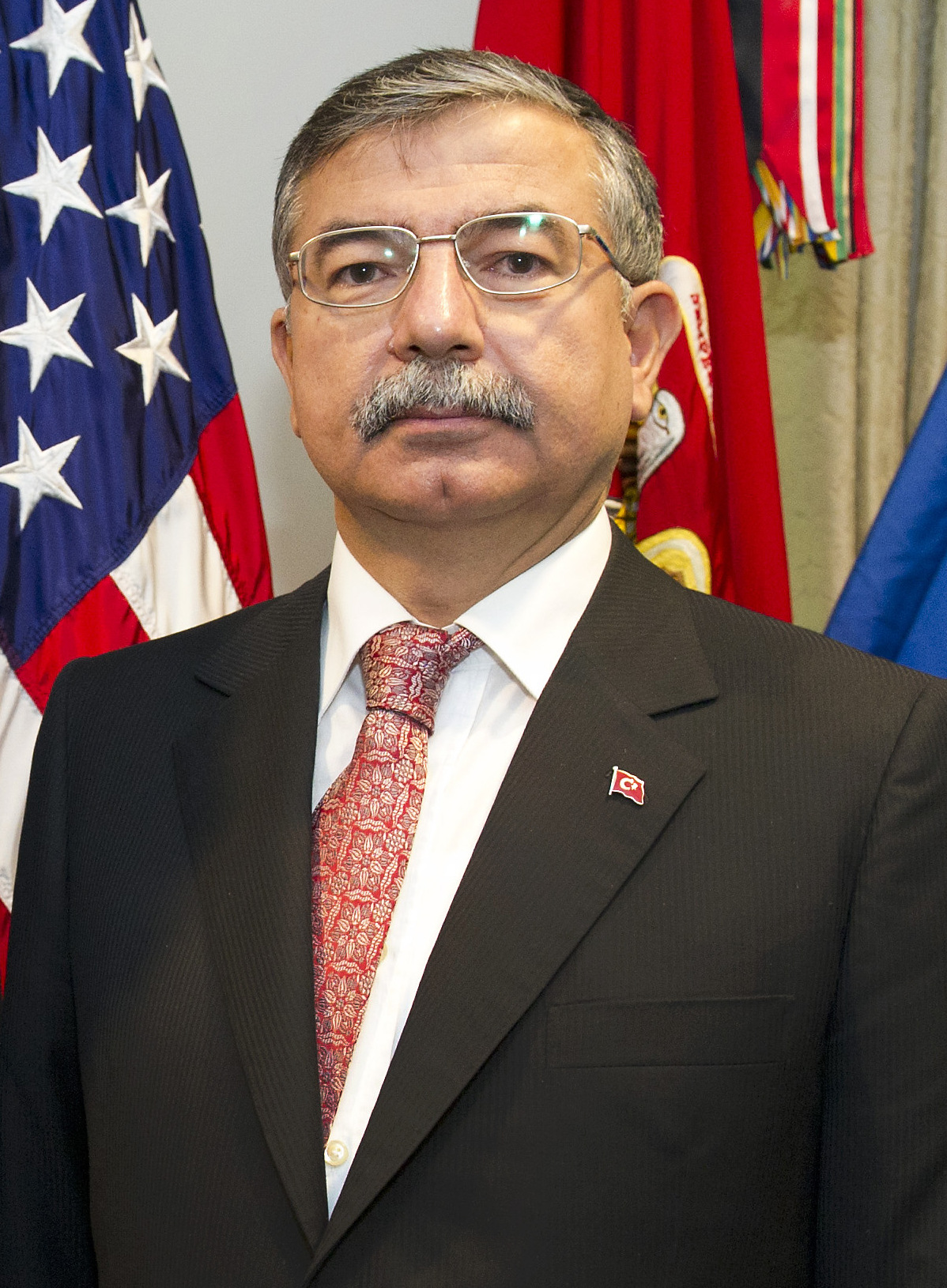
- Yılmaz in 2011

Parliamentary Leader of the Justice and Development Party
- In office 17 November 2021 – 2 June 2023
- Preceded by: Naci Bostancı
- Succeeded by: Abdullah Güler

Minister of National Education
- In office 24 May 2016 – 10 July 2018
- Prime Minister: Binali Yıldırım
- Preceded by: Nabi Avcı
- Succeeded by: Ziya Selçuk

Minister of National Defense
- In office 24 November 2015 – 24 May 2016
- Prime Minister: Ahmet Davutoğlu
- Preceded by: Vecdi Gönül
- Succeeded by: Fikri Işık
- In office 6 July 2011 – 29 August 2014
- Preceded by: Vecdi Gönül
- Succeeded by: Vecdi Gönül

26th Speaker of the Grand National Assembly
- In office 1 July 2015 – 17 November 2015
- President: Recep Tayyip Erdoğan
- Prime Minister: Recep Tayyip Erdoğan; Ahmet Davutoğlu
- Deputy: Naci Bostancı; Şafak Pavey; Koray Aydın; Yurdusev Özsökmenler
- Preceded by: Cemil Çiçek
- Succeeded by: İsmail Kahraman

Member of the Grand National Assembly
- In office 12 June 2011 – 2 June 2023
- Constituency: Sivas (2011, June 2015, Nov 2015, 2018)

Minister of Transport and Communication
- In office 8 May 2007 – 29 August 2007
- Prime Minister: Recep Tayyip Erdoğan
- Preceded by: Binali Yıldırım
- Succeeded by: Binali Yıldırım

Personal details
- Born: 10 December 1961 (age 64) Gürün, Sivas Province, Turkey
- Party: Justice and Development Party
- Education: Haydarpaşa High School
- Alma mater: Istanbul Technical University (BS); Istanbul University (LLB); University of Southern California (MS); Marmara University (LLM); Ankara University (PhD)
- Profession: Mechanical engineer; law consultant; civil servant; politician
- Cabinet: 59th, 61st, 62nd, 64th, 65th

İsmet Yılmaz (born 10 December 1961) is a Turkish politician who was a member of the Grand National Assembly from 2011 to 2023.

Previously he was Minister of National Defense and Minister of National Education. Yılmaz also briefly served as the Speaker of the Grand National Assembly. Prior to entering politics, he worked as a law consultant and mechanical engineer.

== Early life and education ==
İsmet Yılmaz was born in Gürün, Sivas Province. Following his primary education in his hometown, he enrolled in Haydarpaşa High School in Istanbul. Then, he studied mechanical engineering at the School of Maritime in Istanbul Technical University, graduating in 1982 with a bachelor's degree. Yılmaz attended then Istanbul University's Faculty of Law for education in maritime law and finished in 1987. He continued his further studies in "technical management in maritime" at the World Maritime University in Malmö, Sweden earning a master's degree. He received another master's degree in law from the Institute of Social Sciences in Marmara University, Istanbul as well as furthering his studies with a supplemental masters in public policy from the University of Southern California. Finally, İsmet Yılmaz received a Doctor of Law degree from the Institute of Social Sciences at Ankara University.

== Career ==
=== Government ===
After serving twenty years as an engineer and a law consultant, he became Undersecretary of Maritime Affairs at the Ministry of Transport and Communication on December 31, 2002. In accordance with Article 114 of the Constitution of Turkey, he was appointed neutral Minister of Transport and Communication on May 8, 2007, as placeholder for Binali Yıldırım until the 2007 general elections. Yılmaz was appointed Undersecretary at the Ministry of Culture and Tourism on November 1, 2007.

He entered politics as a member of the AK Party and became deputy for Sivas Province following the 2011 general elections. On July 6, 2011, Yılmaz was appointed Minister of National Defence in the Cabinet Erdoğan III. During his first term as Minister of Defense, he praised Turkey's affiliation to NATO and saw its membership as the result of values like democracy and human rights that Turkey was defending.

=== Speaker of Parliament ===
Yılmaz was put forward as the AKP's candidate for Speaker of the Grand National Assembly for the June–July 2015 speaker elections. Since the AKP did not have a majority (276 seats) in Parliament, the election went into a fourth and final round where Yılmaz managed to win a simple majority of the vote on 1 July 2015. He was thus elected as the Speaker with 258 votes (exactly the same number of votes as AKP MPs) to rival Deniz Baykal's 182 votes.

== Personal life ==
İsmet Yılmaz is married and has three children.

Political offices
Preceded by Binali Yıldırım	Minister of Transport and Communication; May 8, 2007 – August 29, 2007	Succeeded by Binali Yıldırım
Preceded by Vecdi Gönül	Minister of National Defence; July 7, 2011 – July 1, 2015	Succeeded by Vecdi Gönül
Preceded by Deniz Baykal	Speaker of the Parliament of Turkey; July 1, 2015 – November 2015	Succeeded by İsmail Kahraman
Preceded by Nabi Avcı	Ministry of National Education; May 24, 2016 – July 10, 2018	Succeeded by Ziya Selçuk
