= Opinion polling for the 2011 Turkish general election =

Opinion polling has been commissioned throughout the duration of the 23rd parliamentary term and in the leadup to the 2011 election by various organisations. The sample size, margin of error and confidence interval of each poll varies by organisation and date.

== Poll results ==
Results of several polling organisations together:

Date	Organisation	AK Party	CHP	MHP	BDP	SP	DSP
May 2010	SONAR	31.09	32.48	18.59	4.27	3.74	3.53
June 2010	Denge	42.4	27.2	11.6	6.1	4.3	–
July 2010	SONAR	31.1	33.5	15.5	5.1	3.3	3.1
August 2010	Konsensus	40.1	30.6	12.0	–	–	–
August 2010	SONAR	37.23	31.20	13.59	4.02	2.39	3.29
September 2010	Andy-ar	44.1	25.3	10.3	5.7	5.8	–
November 2010	AKP	46.8	25.0	12.7	6.0	2.0	–
December 2010	Konsensus	40.9	26.0	15.6	7.5	–	–
December 2010	A&G	44.0	31.0	10.0	–	–	–
December 2010	ORC	40.7	23.3	12.1	5.9	5.4	–
January 2011	Metropoll	43.5	30.7	13.8	6.5	1.3	–
February 2011	USADEM	46.70	27.40	11.21	7.65	–	–
March 2011	İKSara	48	28	15	4,5	1	–
March 2011	MetroPoll	48.3	27.5	11.7	6.6	2	–
March 2011	Konsensus	46.4	25.8	13.6	5.7	2	–
April 9, 2011	GENAR	47.9	24.4	12.2	4.5	2.8	–
April 2011	ORC	50.1	24.5	11.7	4.0	6.1	–
April 30, 2011	GENAR	48.7	25.2	11.9	6.4	-	–
April 2011	İKSara	46.4	30.3	13.5	5.4	1.4	–
April 2011	Marmara	47.1	27.4	11.2	6.0	1.3	0.9
April 2011	AKAM	41.8	25.8	15.1	6.0	3.6	–
20 May 2011	ORC	49.5	25.2	11.3	5.1	6.8	–

== Poll results by Andy-Ar ==
Results of Andy-Ar:

Date	AK Party	CHP	MHP	BDP	SP	DP	DSP	BBP	HSP	Others
November 2010	46.4	24.7	10.2	5.9	1.4	1.2	0.8	1.1	2.9	5.4
December 2010	46,8	26,1	10,6	5,9	1,7	0,9	0,5	2,6	2,8	2,1
January 2011	48,3	25,2	10,6	6,9	2,2	0,5	0,3	2,1	1,1	2,8
February 2011	48,8	26,2	10,4	6,8	1,6	0,4	0,4	2,6	0,9	1,9
March 2011	48,2	26,8	11,2	5.8	1,2	–	–	2,2	2,1	2.5
April 2011	51.2	28.8	10.7	4.3	–	–	–	–	–	–
May 2011	52	27	10.5	7	–	–	–	–	–	–

== Poll results by Konsensus ==
Results of Konsensus Research & Consultanty:

Date	AK Party	CHP	MHP	BDP	SP	Others
June 2010	40,6	30,6	12,0	5,4	2,3	9,6
July 2010	41,1	29,8	12,7	6,2	3,8	6,2
August 2010	44,9	27,0	12,3	5,2	3,0	7,6
September 2010	46,9	24,5	10,6	8,7	3,5	5,8
October 2010	44,8	25,1	12,9	6,7	3,4	7,1
November 2010	40,9	26,0	14,2	7,5	2,5	8,9
December 2010	46,0	26,5	12,5	6,7	3,2	5,1
January 2011	49,6	26,8	11,1	6,9	0,8	4,0
February 2011	46,4	25,8	13,6	5,7	2,2	6,3
March/April 2011	48,9	25,8	10,9	6,0	1,8	2,5
May 2011	48,6	28,3	11,6	6,0	1,2	1,7
