= Isparta (electoral district) =

Electoral district for the Grand National Assembly of Turkey

Coordinates: 37°50′N 34°45′E

- electoral district for the Grand National Assembly of Turkey
- Isparta shown within Turkey
- Province: Isparta
- Electorate: 298,187

Current electoral district
- Created: 1923
- Seats: 4 Historical: 5 (2002–2011) 4 (1999–2002)
- MPs: List: Süreyya Sadi̇ Bi̇lgi̇ç AKP Recep Özel AKP Ali̇ Haydar Öner CHP Süleyman Nevzat Korkmaz MHP
- Turnout at last election: 88.35%
- Representation
- AK Party: 2 / 4
- CHP: 1 / 4
- MHP: 1 / 4

Isparta is an electoral district of the Grand National Assembly of Turkey. It elects four members of parliament (deputies) to represent the province of the same name for a four-year term by the D'Hondt method, a party-list proportional representation system.

== Members ==
Population reviews of each electoral district are conducted before each general election, which can lead to certain districts being granted a smaller or greater number of parliamentary seats.

Isparta returned four MPs during the 1999 parliamentary election. five MPs during the parliamentary elections in 2002 and 2007. In 2011, the number of seats again fell to four.

Isparta is famous for being the constituency from which Süleyman Demirel, the 12th Prime Minister of Turkey and the 9th President of Turkey, was elected to parliament as leader of the Justice Party and later the True Path Party during the 1960–90s.

MPs for Isparta, 1999 onwards
Election	1999 (21st Parliament)	2002 (22nd Parliament)	2007 (23rd Parliament)	2011 (24th Parliament)	June 2015 (25th Parliament)
MP	Erkan Mumcu; ANAP	Mehmet Sait Armağan; AK Party	Süreyya Sadi̇ Bi̇lgi̇ç; AK Party		
MP	Ramazan Gül; DYP	Mehmet Emin Murat Bilgiç; AK Party	Mehmet Sait Dilek; AK Party	Recep Özel; AK Party	
MP	Osman Gazi Aksoy; MHP	Erkan Mumcu; AK Party	Haydar Kemal Kurt; AK Party	Ali Haydar Öner; CHP	İrfan Bakır; CHP
MP	Mustafa Zorlu; MHP	Recep Özel; AK Party	Süleyman Nevzat Korkmaz; MHP		Nuri Okutan; MHP
MP	No seat	Mevlüt Coşkuner; CHP		No seat	

== General elections ==
=== 2011 ===
2011 general election: Isparta
Party	Candidate	Votes	%	±%
AK Party	2 elected ▼1: 1. Sürreya Sadi Bilgiç ✓; 2. Recep Özel ✓; 3. Suat Kolukırık ✗; 4. Pınar Taner Topsakal ✗	135,435	52.90	▲9.03
CHP	1 elected 0: 1. Ali Haydar Öner ✓; 2. İrfan Bakır ✗; 3. Tanseli Çakmak ✗; 4. Naci Yoldaş ✗	55,594	21.72	▲8.37
MHP	1 elected 0: 1. Süleyman Nevzat Korkmaz ✓; 2. Hüseyin Avni Bıçaklı ✗; 3. Ahmet Ziya Nuhoğlu ✗; 4. Ahmet Ayyıldız ✗	48,412	18.91	▼4.75
DP	None elected: 1. Nuri Kaplan ✗; 2. Hasan Kaleli ✗; 3. Fikret Sevinç ✗; 4. Mehmet Ateş ✗	3,745	1.46	▼10.83
SAADET	None elected: 1. Abdulbaki Özyurt ✗; 2. Dinçer Demirezen ✗; 3. Hüseyin Yıldızhan ✗; 4. Adem Oflaz ✗	3,272	1.28	▼1.59
HAS Party	None elected: 1. Faruk Algınkılıç ✗; 2. Zhra Kütükcü ✗; 3. Ali Uysal ✗; 4. Nermin Marulcu ✗	2,620	1.02	▲1.02
Büyük Birlik	None elected: 1. Erdoğan Yeşilyayla ✗; 2. Ayşegül Acar ✗; 3. İsmail Yusuf Atasağun ✗; 4. Yusuf Işık ✗	2,115	0.83	▲0.83
DYP	None elected: 1. İzzet Bilgin ✗; 2. Hüseyin Ali Durmuş ✗; 3. Doğan Hamza Koyu ✗; 4. Ahmet Savcı ✗	1,247	0.49	▲0.49
Independent	None elected: Mehmet Deniz Yıldırım ✗ Mehmet Şevket Savlu ✗ Adem Öcal ✗	966	0.38	▲0.24
HEPAR	None elected: 1. Ali Meydan ✗; 2. Ramazan Aydınlı ✗; 3. Nuri Selim Çetin ✗; 4. Emine Akgün ✗	734	0.29	▲0.29
Labour	None elected: 1. Şükrü Taş ✗; 2. Sıla Söğütlü ✗; 3. Mehmet Hamdi Balcı ✗; 4. Gönül Karagenç ✗	530	0.21	0.00
DSP	None elected: 1. Erdinç Caner Erarslan ✗; 2. Bircan Aslan ✗; 3. Nihat Doğanay ✗; 4. Hasan İsa Güneşsever ✗	453	0.18	N/A
MP	None elected: 1. Mehmet Zeki Özen ✗; 2. Ali İhsan Başat ✗; 3. Osman Ertuğrul ✗; 4. Mevlüt Yavuz ✗	263	0.10	▲0.10
Nationalist Conservative	None elected: 1. Emrah Uslu ✗; 2. Ali Altuğ ✗; 3. Nuray Ordu ✗; 4. Alev Gökdağ ✗	256	0.10	▲0.10
TKP	None elected: 1. İskender Aycan Doğer ✗; 2. Zehra Adıgüzel ✗; 3. Fatma Özbek Şanci ✗; 4. Erol Altıntaş ✗	246	0.10	▼0.06
Liberal Democrat	None elected: 1. Seyit Çakmacı ✗; 2. Enver Gülgen ✗; 3. Evrim Mintaz ✗; 4. Serhat Akkoyun ✗	119	0.05	▲0.04
Total votes		256,007	100.00	
Rejected ballots		8,234	3.13	▲1.24
Turnout		263,442	88.35	▼0.13

== Presidential elections ==
=== 2014 ===
2014 presidential election: Isparta
Party	Candidate	Votes	%
AK Party	Recep Tayyip Erdoğan	133,555	55.46
Independent	Ekmeleddin İhsanoğlu	103,202	42.86
HDP	Selahattin Demirtaş	4,044	1.68
Total votes		240,801	100.00
Rejected ballots		6,564	2.65
Turnout		247,365	81.47
Recep Tayyip Erdoğan win			
