= Gülşen Orhan =

Turkish politician (born 1970)

Member of Grand National Assembly of Turkey
- In office July 2007 – June 2015

Personal details
- Born: 12 December 1972 (age 53) Van Province
- Party: Justice and Development Party
- Children: 1
- Education: University of Ankara
- Profession: Archeologist, Politician

Gülşen Orhan Hanım (born December 12, 1970, in Van, Bahçesaray) is an archeologist and Turkish politician. She is a former member of the Grand National Assembly of Turkey and the Chief advisor to the President of the Republic of Turkey.

== Education ==
She completed her primary and secondary education in Van Province. She graduated from the University of Ankara, Faculty of Language, History and Geography, Department of Archeology.

== Political career ==
In 2007, she was elected the 5th candidate from the Justice and Development Party for Van as one of the 23rd term deputies of the Grand National Assembly of Turkey.

In 2014, She was attacked during a visit to citizens who voted in Müslih Görentaş Primary and Secondary School in Süphan District of Edremit by opposition party supporters during the Presidential voting process in the election centers in Van during the 2014 presidential election.

She was reelected in 2011 and served as the 24th term deputy for Van Province until 2015.

She also served as the general secretary of the Türkiye-Iraq Parliamentary Friendship Group. She speaks Kurdish, English and Persian.

== Family ==
She is the daughter of former Bahçesaray (district) Mayor Naci Orhan, and a sister to six siblings, two sisters and four brothers. She got married and gave birth to her only child after high school. Her husband, Abdulmevla Orhan is a civil engineer who died in a car accident in the ninth year of their marriage.
