= Yurdusev Özsökmenler =

Turkish politician

Deputy Speaker of the Grand National Assembly
- In office 9 July 2015 – 1 November 2015
- Speaker: İsmet Yılmaz
- Serving with: Naci Bostancı; Şafak Pavey; Koray Aydın
- Preceded by: Sadık Yakut
- Succeeded by: Pervin Buldan

Member of the Grand National Assembly
- In office 7 June 2015 – 1 November 2015
- Constituency: Van (June 2015)

Mayor of Bağlar
- In office 28 March 2004 – 29 March 2009
- Preceded by: Cabbar Leygara
- Succeeded by: Yüksel Baran

Personal details
- Born: 1 January 1952 (age 74) Çanakkale, Turkey
- Party: Social Democratic People's Party (2004-2009); Peoples' Democratic Party (2014-)
- Education: Istanbul University

Yurdusev Özsökmenler (born 1 January 1952) is a Turkish politician who served as the Deputy Speaker of the Grand National Assembly from 9 July to 1 November 2015. She was elected as a Member of Parliament for the electoral district of Van in the June 2015 general election from the Peoples' Democratic Party (HDP). She previously served as the mayor of Bağlar between 2004 and 2009.

== Early life and career ==
Yurdusev Özsökmenler was born on 1 January 1952 in the district of Lapseki in Çanakkale Province. Her mother was a primary school teacher. Özsökmenler graduated from Istanbul University Department of Anthropology and Ethnology before becoming a journalist at newspapers such as Özgür Gündem and Özgür Ülke. She later became a publishing expert at the Confederation of Public Workers' Unions (KESK).

== Political career ==
Özsökmenler was a candidate from the Democratic People's Party (DEHAP) for the electoral district of Gaziantep in the 2002 general election. She was not elected since her party failed to win above the 10% election threshold needed to win parliamentary representation.

=== Mayor of Bağlar ===
In the 2004 local elections, Özsökmenler was the candidate of the Social Democratic People's Party (SHP) to become the Mayor of Bağlar Municipality. With 50,733 votes, Özsökmenler was elected Mayor of Bağlar and served until 2009. In the 2009 local elections, Yüksel Baran from the Democratic Society Party (DTP) was elected as Mayor in her place.

=== Deputy Speaker ===
For the June 2015 general election, Özsökmenler became a Peoples' Democratic Party (HDP) candidate from Van and was subsequently elected as a Member of Parliament. The HDP, having the right to choose one of the four Deputy Speakers of the Grand National Assembly by virtue of having 80 MPs, was allegedly initially intending to put forward Dilek Öcalan. Öcalan, who is the nephew of PKK leader Abdullah Öcalan, drew heavy criticism and it was claimed that she did not want the role. In Öcalan's place, Özsökmenler became the HDP's Deputy Speaker of Parliament.

== Accusations of armed terrorism ==
While serving as the mayor of Bağlar, a photo was released by an anti-PKK website based in Europe that allegedly showed Özsökmenler armed and dressed in military uniform at a PKK training camp. The individual who released the picture alleged that Özsökmenler was codenamed 'Ayşe' and the wife of Abdullah Öcalan, having been alleged to have advanced in office because of Öcalan. Özsökmenler and her lawyer denied these claims and referred to the publishing of the photograph as a 'heavy attack on [Özsökmenler's] personality'.

== See also ==
- Kurdish nationalism
- Speaker of the Grand National Assembly
- 25th Parliament of Turkey
