= Kocaeli (electoral district) =

Electoral district for the Grand National Assembly of Turkey

Coordinates: 40°55′N 29°55′E

- electoral district for the Grand National Assembly of Turkey
- Kocaeli shown within Turkey
- Province: Kocaeli
- Electorate: 1,096,593

Current electoral district
- Created: 1920
- Seats: 11 Historical: 9 (2002-2011) 10 (1999-2002) 9 (1995-1999) 7 (1987-1995) 5 (1973-1987) 4 (1969-1973) 5 (1961-1969) 6 (1957-1961) 12 (1954-1957)
- MPs: List: Nihat Ergün AKP Fikri Işık AKP Azize Sibel Gönül AKP Muzaffer Baştopçu AKP Zeki Aygün AKP İlyas Şeker AKP Mehmet Ali Okur AKP Hurşit Güneş CHP Mehmet Hilal Kaplan CHP Haydar Akar CHP Lütfü Türkkan MHP
- Turnout at last election: 89.16%
- Representation
- AK Party: 6 / 11
- CHP: 3 / 11
- MHP: 1 / 11
- HDP: 1 / 11

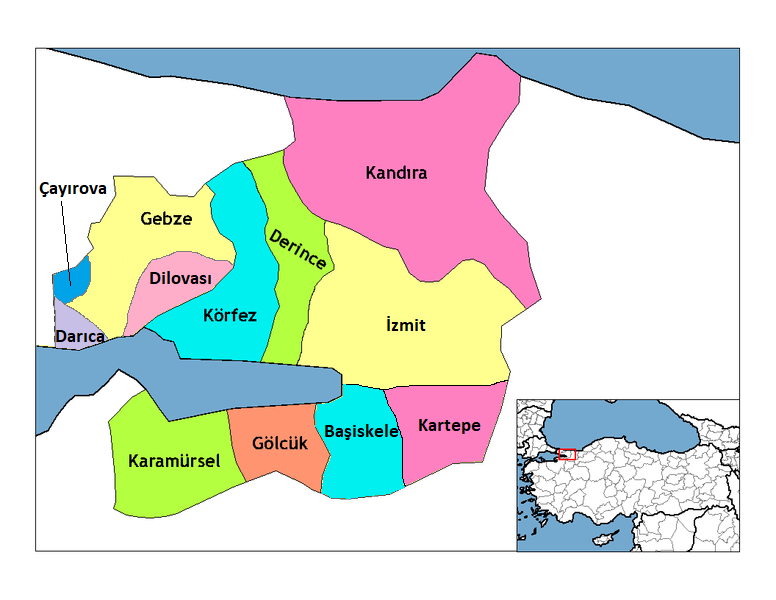
Electoral districts of Kocaeli province

Kocaeli is an electoral district of the Grand National Assembly of Turkey. It elects fourteen members of parliament (deputies) to represent the province of the same name for a four-year term by the D'Hondt method, a party-list proportional representation system.

== Members ==
Population reviews of each electoral district are conducted before each general election, which can lead to certain districts being granted a smaller or greater number of parliamentary seats. At the last election Kocaeli's seat allocation increased to eleven, having generally increased from a low of 4 MPs in 1969.

MPs for Kocaeli, 1999 onwards
Seat	1999 (21st parliament)	2002 (22nd parliament)	2007 (23rd parliament)	2011 (24th parliament)	June 2015 (25th parliament)
1	Meral Akşener; DYP	Nihat Ergün; AKP			Cemalettin Kaflı; AKP
2	Mehmet Batuk; FP	Muzaffer Baştopçu; AKP			Mehmet Akif Yılmaz; AKP
3	Vecdi Gönül; FP	Vecdi Gönül; AKP	Azize Sibel Gönül; AKP		Radiye Sezer Katırcıoğlu; AKP
4	Osman Pepe; FP	Osman Pepe; AKP		İlyas Şeker; AKP	
5	Sefer Ekşi; Anavatan	Nevzat Doğan; AKP	Fikri Işık; AKP		
6	Cumali Durmuş; MHP	Eyüp Ayar; AKP		Zeki Aygün; AKP	
7	Kemal Köse; MHP	İzzet Çetin; CHP	Cumali Durmuş; MHP	Mustafa Sait Gönen; MHP	Saffet Sancaklı; MHP
8	Ahmet Arkan; DSP	Mehmet Sefa Sirmen; CHP	Hikmet Erenkaya; CHP	Hurşit Güneş; CHP	Tahsin Tarhan; CHP
9	Halil Çalık; DSP	Salih Gün; CHP	Mehmet Cevdet Selvi; CHP	Mehmet Hilal Kaplan; CHP	Fatma Kaplan Hürriyet; CHP
10	Muhammet Turhan İmamoğlu; DSP	No seat		Haydar Akar; CHP	
11	No seat			Mehmet Ali Okur; AKP	Ali Haydar Konca; HDP

== General elections ==
=== 2011 ===
Unelected candidates in small text.

2011 Turkish general election: Kocaeli
List	Candidates	Votes	Of total (%)	± from prev.
AK Party	Nihat Ergün, Fikri Işık, Azize Sibel Gönül, Muzaffer Baştopçu, Zeki Aygün, İlyas Şeker, Mehmet Ali Okur	504,535	52.71	
CHP	Hurşit Güneş, Mehmet Hilal Kaplan, Haydar Akar	235,770	24.63	
MHP	Lütfü Türkkan	114,304	11.94	
SAADET	None elected	41,870	4.37	
Independent	None elected	22,153	2.31	
HAS Party	None elected	14,939	1.56	N/A
DP	None elected	5995	0.63	
Büyük Birlik	None elected	5615	0.59	
HEPAR	None elected	3796	0.40	
DSP	None elected	2414	0.25	'"`UNIQ−−ref−0000000D−QINU`"'
DYP	None elected	1859	0.19	
MP	None elected	1716	0.18	
TKP	None elected	1452	0.15	
Nationalist Conservative	None elected	759	0.08	
Labour	None elected	0		
Liberal Democrat	None elected	0		
Turnout		1,096,593	89.16	

=== June 2015 ===
Abbr.	Party	Votes	%
AKP	Justice and Development Party	487,781	46.3%
CHP	Republican People's Party	256,678	24.4%
MHP	Nationalist Movement Party	161,492	15.3%
HDP	Peoples' Democratic Party	77,562	7.4%
	Other	69,248	6.6%
Total		1,052,761	
Turnout		88.08	
source:YSK

=== November 2015 ===
Abbr.	Party	Votes	%
AKP	Justice and Development Party	621,198	56.5%
CHP	Republican People's Party	257,810	23.4%
MHP	Nationalist Movement Party	123,662	11.2%
HDP	Peoples' Democratic Party	60,722	5.5%
	Other	36,388	3.3%
Total		1,099,780	
Turnout		89.90	
source:YSK

=== 2018 ===
Abbr.	Party	Votes	%
AKP	Justice and Development Party	556,671	47.3%
CHP	Republican People's Party	235,465	20%
MHP	Nationalist Movement Party	132,452	11.3%
IYI	Good Party	122,645	10.4%
HDP	Peoples' Democratic Party	82,860	7%
SP	Felicity Party	25,950	2.2%
	Other	19,619	1.7%
Total		1,175,662	
Turnout		89.84	
source:YSK

== Presidential elections ==
=== 2014 ===
Presidential Election 2014: Kocaeli
Party	Candidate	Votes	%
AK Party	Recep Tayyip Erdoğan	521,489	58.54
Independent	Ekmeleddin İhsanoğlu	320,516	35.98
HDP	Selahattin Demirtaş	48,893	5.49
Total votes		890,898	100.00
Rejected ballots		21,952	2.40
Turnout		912,850	77.02
Recep Tayyip Erdoğan win			
