= Hurşit Güneş =

Turkish politician

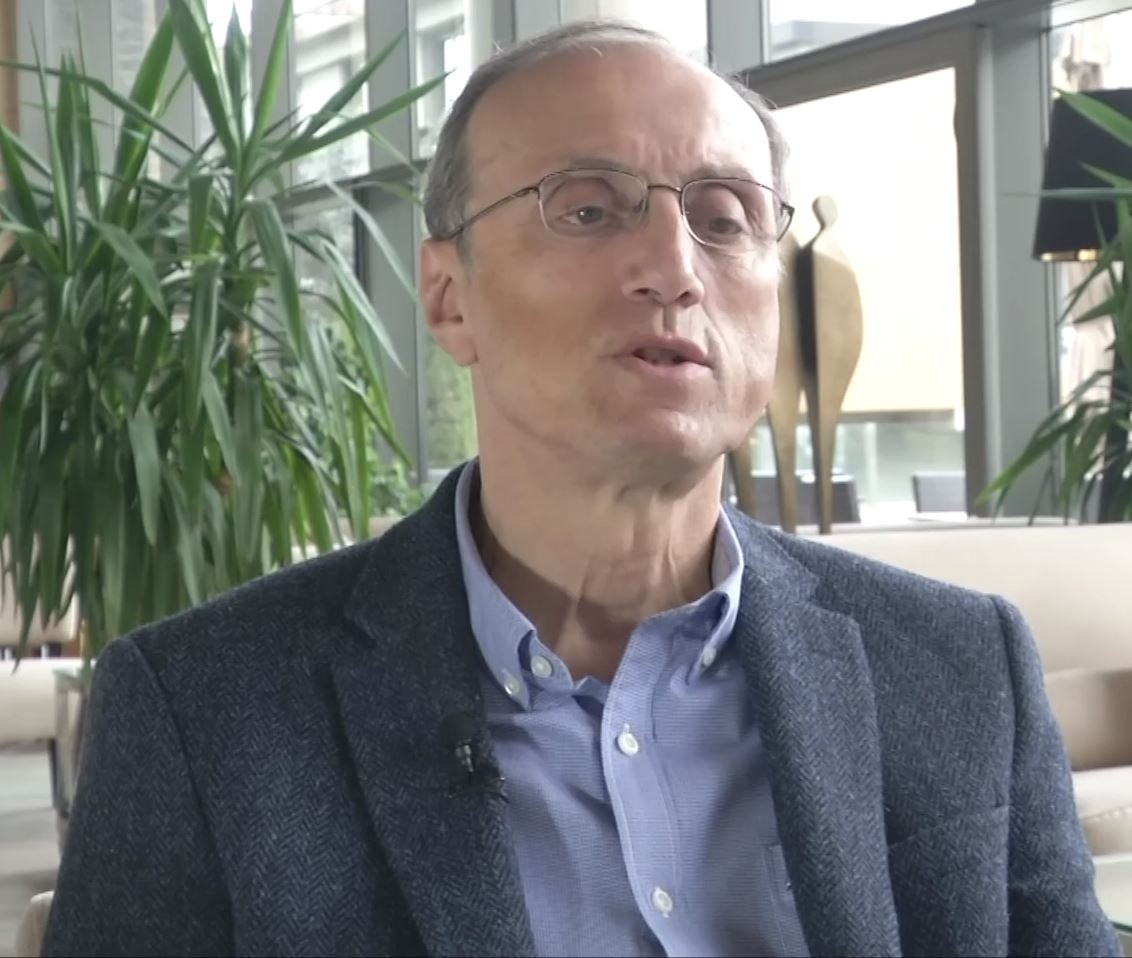

Hurşit Güneş (born 23 April 1957) is a Turkish politician and professor of economics, who had served as deputy chairman of Republican People's Party (CHP); and he has been deputy of Kocaeli Province since 2011.

== Biography ==
He was born to Turan Güneş and Nermin Solmaz Güneş in Ankara on 23 April 1957. After his high school education in Ankara College, he received his BA with honors in Economics and Politics from University of Kent at Canterbury in 1980. He later received his Magister in Scienta Economica degree from University of Wales, Cardiff. He started his academic career as a research assistant at Marmara University in 1984. Meanwhile, he received his PhD from Boğaziçi University in 1988 with the thesis titled "The Determination and Control of Money Supply in Turkey".

In 1986, he was invited to be one of founding members of European Economic Association, established in Belgium. In 1990, he won the European Integration Project Award given by EU, with two of his colleagues. He acted as the chief economic advisor for late Erdal İnönü during the DYP-SHP coalition government prepared the drafts of Competition Law and Consumer Protection Law.

He was a visiting professor at University of Manchester in 1994. He was appointed as a full-professor by 1996. During 1995- 2002, he gave consultancy services to most financial institutions in the country. He was the chairman of Marsh Insurance Turkey during 2002–2007. He designed a banking simulation system interactive with macro-economic models and a real-time consumer confidence index for Turkey (CNBC-e CCI). He was also a columnist at the daily newspaper Milliyet during 2001–2010.

He taught at Marmara University for more than 25 years on Monetary Economics for undergraduate students and Advanced Macro Theory for post-graduate students. He retired at the beginning of 2010, and started working at Bahçeşehir University. He is now working in Marmara University.

In December 2014, as a parliamentary debate was ongoing over getting exempted from military service by making payments, he proposed introduction of enforced conscription for women. The Republican People's Party declared that he was not taken to the party's candidate list for the general election to be held on 7 June.
