= Bilal Macit =

Turkish politician (born 1984)

Muhamet Bilal Macit (born September 11, 1984) is a Turkish politician. He was elected to Parliament in the 2011 general election as a Justice and Development Party (AK Party) deputy.

== Early life ==
Macit was born on September 11, 1984, in Istanbul. He completed his junior high school education at Istanbul Kartal Anadolu İmam Hatip Lisesi and his high school education at Beşiktaş Atatürk Anadolu Lisesi. He earned a scholarship program for Social and Political Sciences at Sabancı University. He graduated from this university in 2008, specializing in international relations. He also received lessons on Media and Political Relations at Boston University.

Macit went to England for a postgraduate education. He has received a Master's Degree in Business Administration from Brunel University. He then completed a master's degree in public policy at the university of King's College London. He produced academic studies about democracy and development.

He gained work experience at AC Nielsen, Coca-Cola and Turkish Airlines. He speaks English and French fluently

== Political career ==
Bilal Macit joined the ruling Justice and Development Party and became a Member of Parliament after the 2011 general election. He is the youngest MP of the 24th parliamentary term.
