= Xaçmaz =

Xaçmaz or Khachmaz may refer to:

- Khachmaz District, Azerbaijan
- Khachmaz (city), Azerbaijan
- Xaçmaz, Oghuz, Azerbaijan

== See also ==
- Kaçmaz
- Köhnə Xaçmaz, "Old Xaçmaz"
- Xaçmazqışlaq, "Xaçmaz village"
