= Gülcan Kaçmaz Sayyiğit =

Turkish politician (born 1982)

Gülcan Kaçmaz Sayyiğit (born 1982, Gevas, Turkey) is an educator and politician. Since June 2023, she is a member of the Grand National Assembly of Turkey representing Van for the Green Left Party (YSP).

== Early life and education ==
Gülcan Kaçmaz Sayyiğit was born in 1982 in Gevas where she received primary and high school education. Following she studied geography at the Yücüncü Yil University in Van. Between 2008 and 2012 she was a geography teacher in Çatak, where she was also an involved in the Education and Science Workers' Union (Egitim Sen) during the same years.

== Professional career ==
Between 2012 and 2017 she was an educator at the vocational high school in Edremit. She eventually served as the co-chair of the Van branch of the Egitim Sen. In 2017, Sayyiğit was dismissed from public office per decree during a state of emergency.

== Political career ==
In the local election of March 2019 Gülcan Kaçmaz Sayyiğit was elected as the mayor of Edremit for the Peoples' Democratic Party (HDP) with over 50 per cent of the votes. However, the Supreme Election Council refused to accept her electoral success, but gave the mayorship to Ismail Say of the Justice and Development Party (AKP) who placed second. In the parliamentary elections of May 2023, Gülcan Kaçmaz Sayyiğit was elected to the Grand National Assembly of Turkey, representing Van for the YSP.

== Personal life ==
Gülcan Kaçmaz Sayyiğit is married and is the mother of one child.
