= 2011 Turkish general election =

- 12 June 2011

All 550 seats in the Grand National Assembly 276 seats needed for a majority
- Opinion polls
- Turnout: 83.16% (▼1.09 pp)
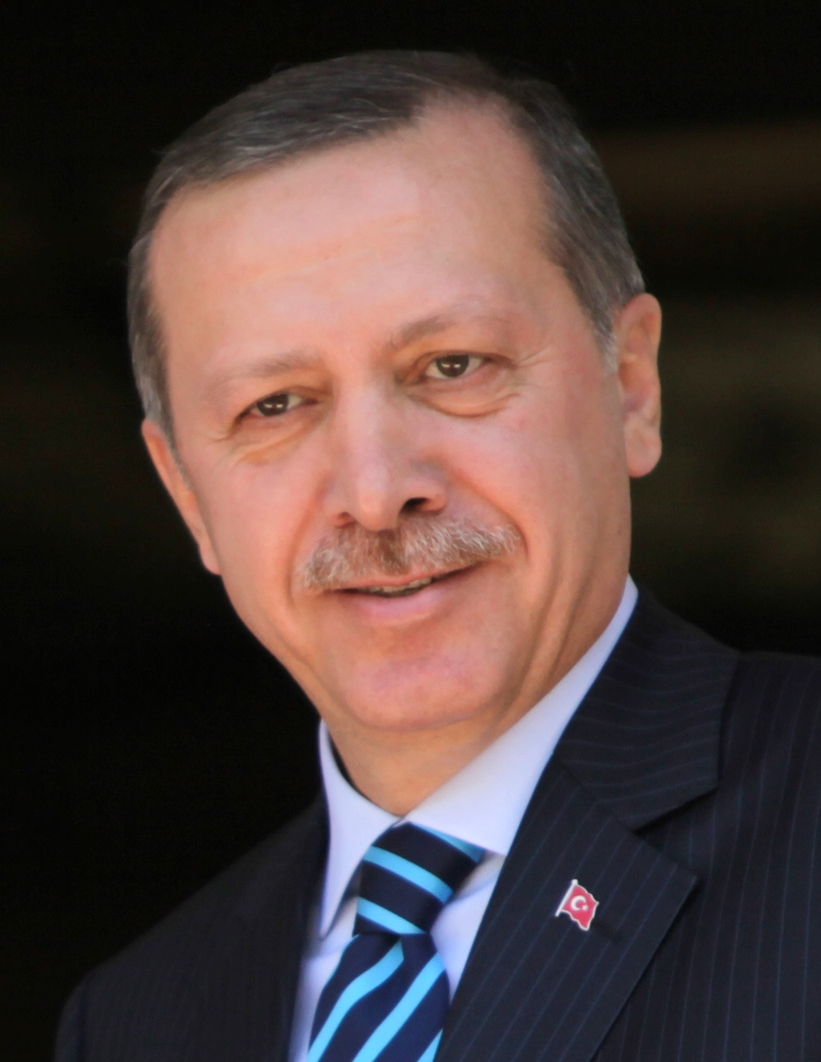

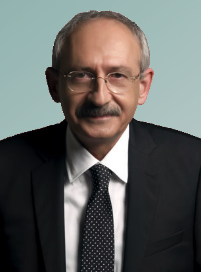

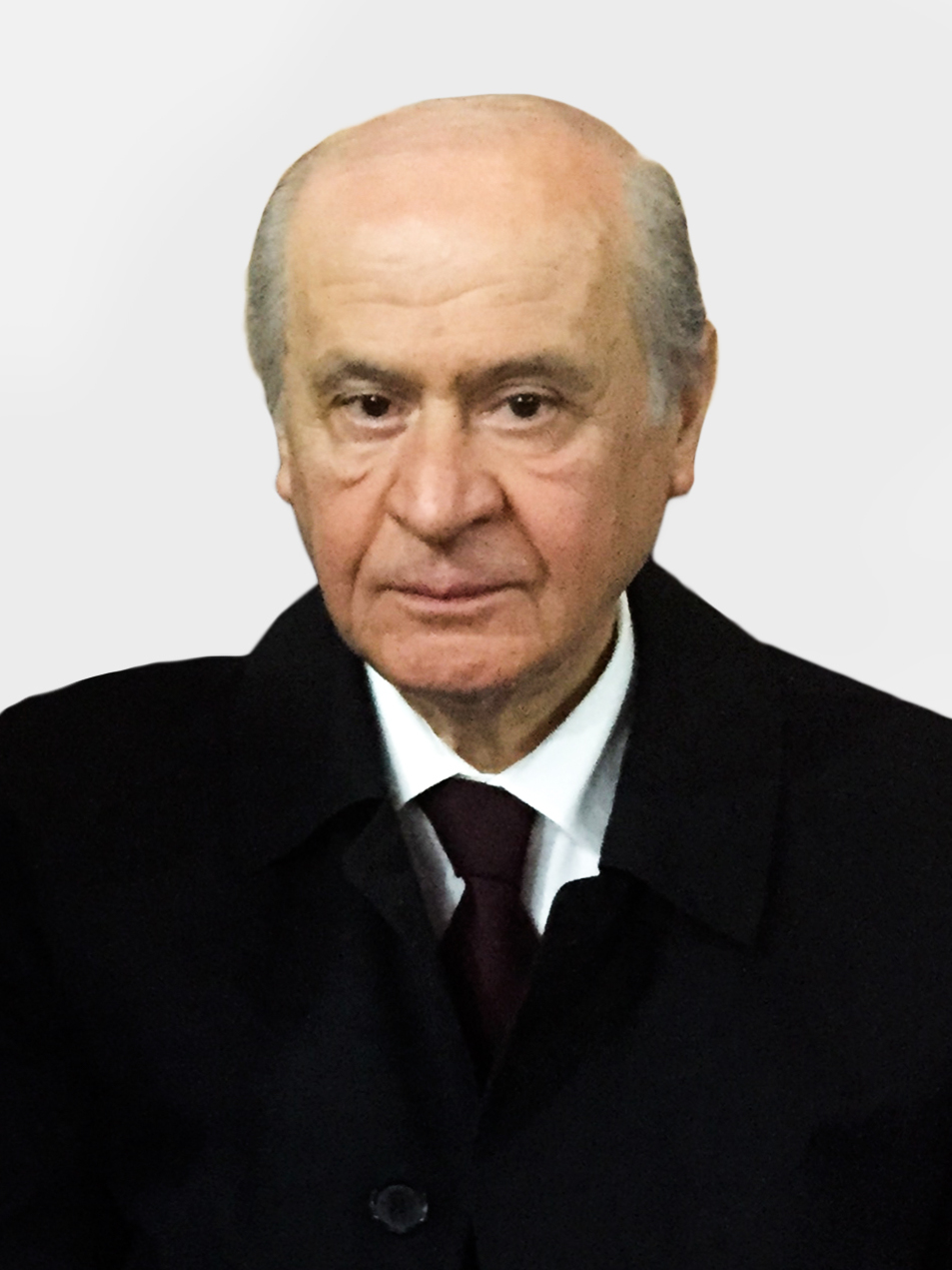
	First party	Second party	Third party
Leader	Recep Tayyip Erdoğan	Kemal Kılıçdaroğlu	Devlet Bahçeli
Party	AK Party	CHP	MHP
Last election	46.58%, 341 seats	20.88%, 112 seats	14.27%, 71 seats
Seats won	327	135	53
Seat change	▼14	▲23	▼18
Popular vote	21,399,082	11,155,972	5,585,513
Percentage	49.83%	25.98%	13.01%
Swing	▲3.25pp	▲5.10pp	▼1.26pp
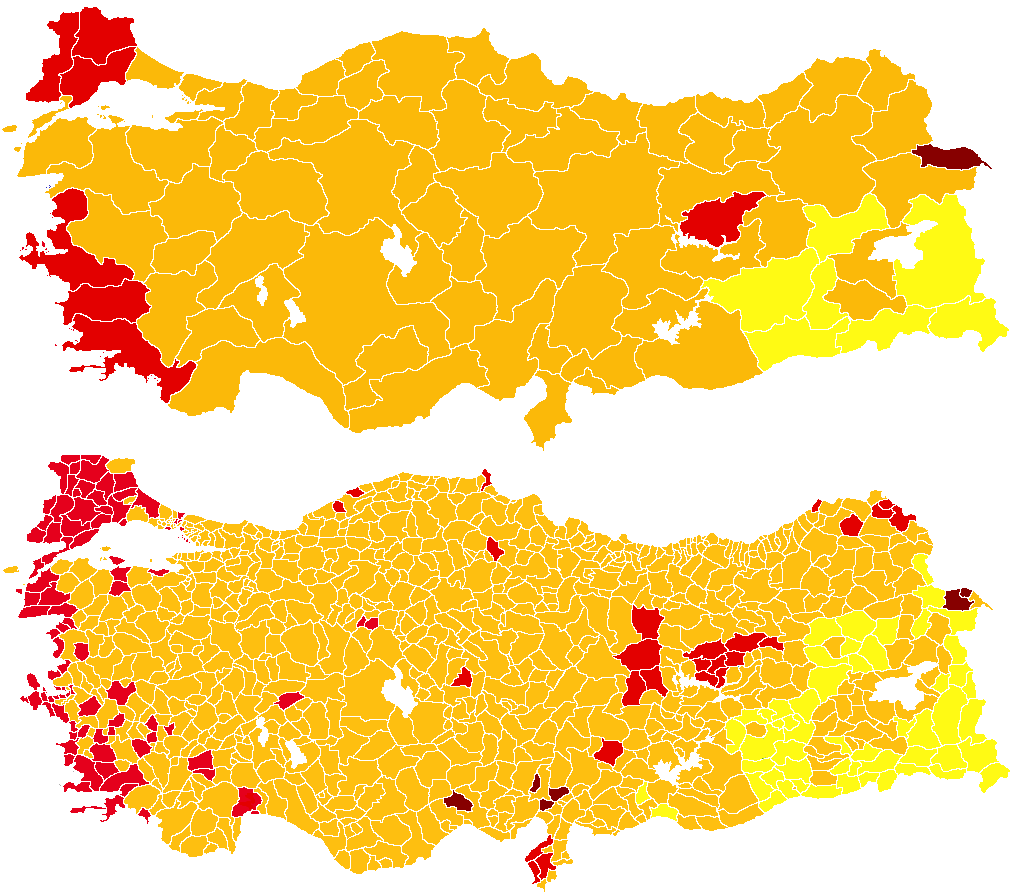
- Most voted-for party by province (top) and district (bottom); AKP CHP MHP Labour, Democracy and Freedom Bloc (Note: The Labour, Democracy and Freedom Bloc contested the election as independents to bypass the 10% election threshold. Provinces & districts where the total votes for all independents combined topped the poll are shown in grey, even though these candidates may have won fewer votes than other parties individually.)
Prime Minister before election
Recep Tayyip Erdoğan
AK Party
Elected Prime Minister
Recep Tayyip Erdoğan
AK Party

General elections were held in Turkey on 12 June 2011 to elect the 550 members of Grand National Assembly. In accordance to the result of the constitutional referendum held in 2007, the elections were held four years after the previous elections in 2007 instead of five.

The result was a third consecutive victory for the incumbent Justice and Development Party (AKP), with its leader Recep Tayyip Erdoğan being re-elected as Prime Minister for a third term with 49.8% of the vote and 327 MPs. This represented an increase of 3.2% since the 2007 Turkish general election and an 11.4% rise since the 2009 Turkish local elections. The victory was attributed to the strong sustained economic recovery after the Great Recession as well as the completion of several projects such as the İzmir commuter railway, inter-city high speed rail lines and airports in Amasya, Gökçeada and Gazipaşa (Antalya).

The Republican People's Party (CHP) also saw an increase in its popular vote share, receiving 26.0% and winning 135 seats. The Nationalist Movement Party (MHP) received 13.0% and won 53 seats, representing a slight loss of support since 2007. The elections were the first to be contested by the CHP's new leader Kemal Kılıçdaroğlu, who replaced Deniz Baykal in 2010.

The elections were marred by violence originating mainly from the Kurdistan Workers' Party (PKK), which is recognised as a terrorist organisation by Turkey, the European Union and the United States.

== Background ==
Emboldened by the 2010 constitutional referendum, AKP leaders said they would create a new constitution after the 2011 elections.

On 3 March 2011 Parliament approved a ruling party proposal to set 12 June as the date for the general elections. The proposal was submitted by the ruling Justice and Development Party (AKP) on 21 February and was approved unanimously in the Parliament's General Assembly. In its proposal, the AKP pointed to the appropriateness of 12 June as the election date considering the June dates for the placement test for high schools (SBS) and the university entrance exam (LYS). Seeking high voter turnout, the heat during the summer was also considered during the choice of date.

== Electoral system ==
In accordance with a law approved by Parliament last year that made changes to Turkey's election laws, Turkish voters encountered some new rules and reforms during the general election of 2011. The changes sought to bring Turkish election campaign regulations up to European standards.

- The age for parliamentary eligibility was reduced from 30 to 25.
- Wooden ballot boxes were replaced by new ballot boxes made out of hard plastic that were transparent, shatterproof, and resistant to heat.
- Voting booths were upgraded to a stronger, safer, and more portable model.
- Voting envelopes were made larger and had different colors for each matter that was being voted upon.
- Campaigning was now allowed until two hours after sunset. Under the previous law, campaigning after sundown was forbidden.
- Citizens were able to vote without official identification as long as they could provide their identity number.
- Anyone who prevented someone from casting their vote would receive three to five years in prison.

Turkish voters living abroad will have to wait for another election to be able to cast their votes in the countries in which they are residing due to the inability to institute electronic voting. Turkish voters abroad thus needed to cast their votes at customs gates.

=== Regions ===
The number of MPs by province was redistributed according to the most recent population data. The number of deputies in Parliament for Istanbul was increased by 15, for Ankara by three and İzmir by two; Antalya, Diyarbakır, Van and Şırnak each received one more seat in Parliament. Ankara's two regions yielded 15 and 16 deputies. Istanbul, made up of three regions, elected 30, 27 and 28 deputies. İzmir, with two regions, elected 13 deputies each from both regions.

The number of MPs by province

- Adana 14
- Adıyaman 5
- Afyonkarahisar 5
- Ağrı 4
- Amasya 3
- Ankara, region 1, 15
- Ankara, region 2, 16
- Antalya 14
- Artvin 2
- Aydın 7
- Balıkesir 8
- Bilecik 2
- Bingöl 3
- Bitlis 3
- Bolu 3
- Burdur 3
- Bursa 18
- Çanakkale 4
- Çankırı 2
- Çorum 4
- Denizli 7
- Diyarbakır 11
- Edirne 3
- Elazığ 5
- Erzincan 2
- Erzurum 6
- Eskişehir 6
- Gaziantep 12
- Giresun 4
- Gümüşhane 2
- Hakkâri 3
- Hatay 10
- Isparta 4
- Mersin 11
- Istanbul, region 1, 30
- Istanbul, region 2, 27
- Istanbul, region 3, 28
- İzmir, region 1, 13
- İzmir, region 2, 13
- Kars 3
- Kastamonu 3
- Kayseri 9
- Kırklareli 3
- Kırşehir 2
- Kocaeli 11
- Konya 14
- Kütahya 5
- Malatya 6
- Manisa 10
- Kahramanmaraş 8
- Mardin 6
- Muğla 6
- Muş 4
- Nevşehir 3
- Niğde 3
- Ordu 6
- Rize 3
- Sakarya 7
- Samsun 9
- Siirt 3
- Sinop 2
- Sivas 5
- Tekirdağ 6
- Tokat 5
- Trabzon 6
- Tunceli 2
- Şanlıurfa 12
- Uşak 3
- Van 8
- Yozgat 4
- Zonguldak 5
- Aksaray 3
- Bayburt 1
- Karaman 2
- Kırıkkale 3
- Batman 4
- Şırnak 4
- Bartın 2
- Ardahan 2
- Iğdır 2
- Yalova 2
- Karabük 2
- Kilis 2
- Osmaniye 4
- Düzce 3

== Contesting parties ==
On 5 March 2011 Turkey's Supreme Election Board announced that twenty-seven political parties had signed up to participate in the 12 June general elections:

- Alternative Party (Alternatif Parti, AP)
- Communist Party of Turkey (Türkiye Komünist Partisi, TKP)
- Democrat Party (Demokrat Parti, DP)
- Democratic Left Party (Demokratik Sol Parti, DSP)
- Equality and Democracy Party (Eşitlik ve Demokrasi Partisi, EDP)
- Felicity Party (Saadet Partisi, SP)
- Freedom and Solidarity Party (Özgürlük ve Dayanışma Partisi, ÖDP)
- Great Union Party (Büyük Birlik Partisi, BBP)
- Homeland Party (Yurt Parti, YURT-P)
- Independent Turkey Party (Bağımsız Türkiye Partisi, BTP)
- Justice and Development Party (Adalet ve Kalkınma Partisi, AKP)
- Labour Party (Emek Partisi, EMEP)
- Liberal Democratic Party (Liberal Demokrat Parti, LDP)
- Nation Party (Millet Partisi, MP)
- Nationalist and Conservative Party (Milliyetçi ve Muhafazakar Parti, MMP)
- Nationalist Movement Party (Milliyetçi Hareket Partisi, MHP)
- New Party (Yeni Parti, YP)
- Peace and Democracy Party (Barış ve Demokrasi Partisi, BDP)
- People's Ascent Party (Halkın Yükselişi Partisi, HYP)
- People's Voice Party (Halkın Sesi Partisi, HAS Parti)
- Republican People's Party (Cumhuriyet Halk Partisi, CHP)
- Rights and Equality Party (Hak ve Eşitlik Partisi, HEPAR)
- Rights and Freedoms Party (Hak ve Özgürlükler Partisi, HAKPAR)
- True Path Party (Doğru Yol Partisi, DYP)
- Turkey Party (Türkiye Partisi, TP)
- Workers' Party (İşçi Partisi, İP)
- Young Party (Genç Parti, GP)

Nine smaller political parties decided to change their election strategy. Some of them decided to participate in the elections as independent, while others formed an alliance under one party. On 19 April 2011 the Supreme Election Board announced that ÖDP and YP could not join the 12 June general elections as they could not hand out their necessary documents on time. Thus, the number of political parties joined the elections dropped to 15.

== Campaign ==
=== Justice and Development Party ===
The large number of applications gave the ruling Justice and Development Party (AKP) nearly 15 million Turkish Liras in revenue ahead of the 12 June general elections. AKP, which had the most female deputies in the outgoing Parliament, planned to expand that number for the new term. Its aim was that all provinces with four to five deputies had at least one female deputy candidate during the election. The total 5,599 applications to the AKP included those of 855 female candidates and 315 candidates with disabilities. Each male applicant paid a fee of 3,000 liras, while women paid half that sum and people with disabilities had their fees waived. The applications thus brought in a total of 14.85 million liras to the party. This revenue, however, will not remain in the AKP's bank account after the elections, party leader Erdoğan said, explaining that candidates who did not make it onto the party's list will have their money returned.

Key figures who applied to be AKP candidates included Ambassador Volkan Bozkır, the head of Turkey's General Secretariat for the European Union and former Istanbul Governor Muammer Güler.

12 April 2011 was the last date for political parties to submit their list of candidate MPs to the Higher Election Board for the general elections. Prime Minister Erdoğan dismissed half his party's parliamentary deputies for this election, aiming to rejuvenate the party as he sought a third term in power. Erdoğan nominated only 146 deputies out of the 333 parliamentary seats for the ruling Justice & Development party to stand again in this election. Of the AKP's 550 candidates, 514 had university degrees. There were also 11 people with disabilities on the list. Important figures from the party kept their positions with many ministers moved to the coastal regions where the party previously attracted fewer votes.

Following a rally by Erdoğan in Kastamonu on 4 May, assailants ambushed a police convoy killing one person and wounding another. The Kurdistan Workers Party claimed responsibility for the attack after Erdoğan accused "separatists" at another rally for the attack.

Locations of the election rallies of the Justice and Development Party
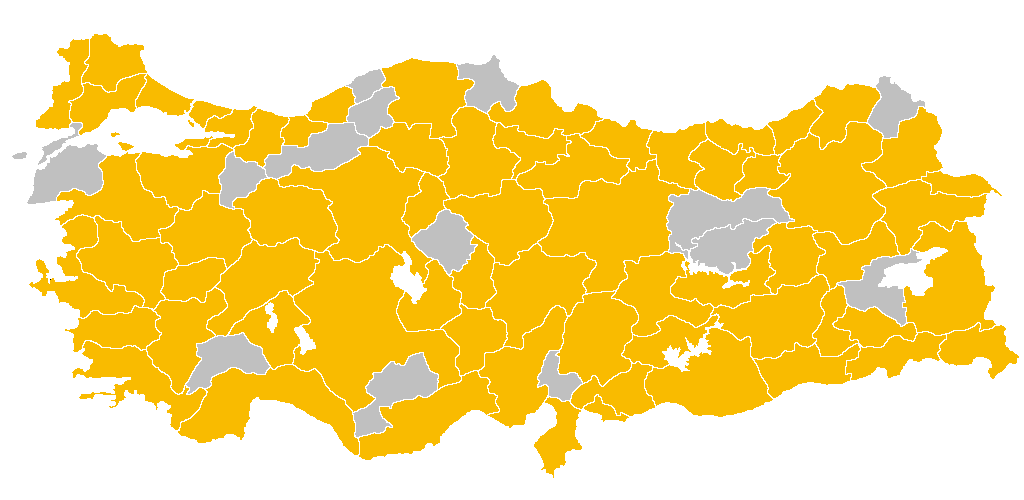
- Map of the election rallies of the Justice and Development Party
- April 22: Bayburt, Gümüşhane
- April 24: Beykoz, Şile, Çekmeköy, Sancaktepe
- April 30: Muş, Iğdır
- May 2: Arnavutköy, Sultangazi
- May 3: Esenyurt, Beylikdüzü, Büyükçekmece
- May 4: Kastamonu, Amasya
- May 5: Adana, Osmaniye
- May 7: Yığılca, Düzce, Zonguldak
- May 8: Kilis, Kahramanmaraş
- May 10: Afyon, Kütahya
- May 11: Çorlu, Lüleburgaz, Edirne
- May 12: Balıkesir, Yalova
- May 13: Manisa, Denizli
- May 14: Rize, Giresun
- May 15: Uşak, Antalya
- May 16: Siteler, Keçiören, Sincan
- May 17: Yozgat, Malatya
- May 18: Tokat, Çorum
- May 19: Siirt
- May 20: Kars, Van
- May 21: Hakkâri, Şanlıurfa
- May 22: Kocaeli, Bursa
- May 24: Şırnak, Batman
- May 25: Kırıkkale, Nevşehir
- May 26: Niğde, Aksaray
- May 27: Aydın, Muğla
- May 28: Hatay, Eskişehir
- May 29: Kayseri, Ankara
- May 30: Ümraniye, Ataşehir, Kartal, Çağlayan
- May 31: Trabzon, Ordu
- June 1: Diyarbakır
- June 2: Isparta, Mersin
- June 3: Konya, Samsun
- June 4: Adana, İzmir
- June 5: Sakarya, Istanbul
- June 6: Çankırı
- June 7: Adıyaman, Mardin
- June 8: Elazığ, Bingöl
- June 9: Sivas, Gaziantep
- June 10: Erzurum, Ağrı
- June 11: Tuzla, Maltepe, Üsküdar

=== Republican People's Party ===
The 2011 general election was the first general election in which Kemal Kılıçdaroğlu participated as the leader of Republican People's Party (CHP). The former CHP leader Deniz Baykal resigned from his post in May 2010 and left the CHP with 26% of the votes, according to opinion polls. Kılıçdaroğlu announced that he would resign from his post if he was not successful in the 2011 elections. He did not provide details as to what his criteria for success were. Over 3,500 people applied to run for the main opposition party in the June elections. Male candidates paid 3,000 Turkish Liras to submit an application; female candidates paid 2,000 while those with disabilities paid 500 liras. Among the candidates were former CHP leader Deniz Baykal and arrested Ergenekon suspects such as Mustafa Balbay and Mehmet Haberal.

The party held primary elections in 29 provinces. Making a clean break with the past, Kemal Kılıçdaroğlu left his mark on the Republican People's Party's 435-candidate list, leaving off 78 current deputies as he sought to redefine and reposition the main opposition. The CHP's candidate list also included 11 politicians who were formerly part of center-right parties, such as the Motherland Party, the True Path Party and the Turkey Party. Center-right voters gravitated toward the AKP when these other parties virtually collapsed after the 2002 elections. Key party figures that did not make it on to the list, criticised the CHP for making "a shift in axis."

== Opinion polls ==
In the local elections of 2009, the ruling AKP received 39% of the votes. The second party CHP received 23% of the votes, and the third party MHP received 16% of the votes. In the run up to the general election of 2011, the polling organisations noted a growth in the popularity of the AKP. Polling organisations showed a rate between 42% and 51%. For CHP, the numbers varied between 25% and 30%. MHP was mostly shown between 10% and 14%

== Results ==
Party	Votes	%	Seats	+/–
Justice and Development Party	21,399,082	49.83	327	–14
Republican People's Party	11,155,972	25.98	135	+23
Nationalist Movement Party	5,585,513	13.01	53	–18
Felicity Party	543,454	1.27	0	0
People's Voice Party	329,723	0.77	0	New
Great Union Party	323,251	0.75	0	New
Democrat Party	279,480	0.65	0	0
Rights and Equality Party	124,415	0.29	0	New
Democratic Left Party	108,089	0.25	0	New
True Path Party	64,607	0.15	0	New
Communist Party of Turkey	64,006	0.15	0	0
Nation Party	60,716	0.14	0	New
Nationalist and Conservative Party	36,188	0.08	0	New
Labour Party	32,128	0.07	0	0
Liberal Democrat Party	15,222	0.04	0	0
Independents	2,819,917	6.57	35	+8
Total	42,941,763	100.00	550	0
Valid votes	42,941,763	97.78		
Invalid/blank votes	973,185	2.22		
Total votes	43,914,948	100.00		
Registered voters/turnout	52,806,322	83.16		
Source: YSK

=== By electoral district ===
Province	AKP	CHP	MHP	IND (Note: All 35 Independent MPs were elected from the Labour, Democracy and Freedom Block supported by parties such as the Peace and Democracy Party. The candidates contested the election as independents in order to bypass the 10% threshold.)	Total
Adana	6	4	3	1	14
Adıyaman	5				5
Afyonkarahisar	3	1	1		5
Ağrı	3			1	4
Aksaray	3				3
Amasya	2	1			3
Ankara (I)	8	6	2		16
Ankara (II)	9	4	2		15
Ankara total	17	10	4		31
Antalya	6	5	3		14
Ardahan	1	1			2
Artvin	1	1			2
Aydın	3	3	1		7
Balıkesir	4	3	1		8
Bartın	1	1			2
Batman	2			2	4
Bayburt	1				1
Bilecik	1		1		2
Bingöl	3				3
Bitlis	2			1	3
Bolu	2	1			3
Burdur	2	1			3
Bursa	11	5	2		18
Çanakkale	2	2			4
Çankırı	2				2
Çorum	3	1			4
Denizli	4	2	1		7
Diyarbakır (Note: Hatip Dicle was initially elected as an independent MP for Diyarbakır, but his election was annulled by the Supreme Electoral Council of Turkey. His place was taken by an AKP candidate who was the sixth on the party list.)	6			4	10
Düzce	3				3
Edirne	1	2			3
Elazığ	4	1			5
Erzincan	1	1			2
Erzurum	5		1		6
Eskişehir	3	2	1		6
Gaziantep	9	2	1		12
Giresun	3	1			4
Gümüşhane	2				2
Hakkâri				3	3
Hatay	5	4	1		10
Iğdır			1	1	2
Isparta	2	1	1		4
İstanbul (I)	16	11	2	1	30
İstanbul (II)	15	9	2	1	27
İstanbul (III)	15	9	3	1	28
İstanbul total	46	29	7	3	85
İzmir (I)	6	6	1		13
İzmir (II)	5	7	1		13
İzmir total	11	13	2		26
Kahramanmaraş	6	1	1		8
Karabük	2				2
Karaman	2				2
Kars	2			1	3
Kastamonu	2		1		3
Kayseri	7	1	1		9
Kırıkkale	3				3
Kırklareli	2	1			9
Kırşehir	2				2
Kilis	2				2
Kocaeli	7	3	1		11
Konya	11	1	2		14
Mersin	4	4	2	1	11
Muğla	2	3	1		6
Muş	2			2	4
Nevşehir	3				3
Niğde	2	1			3
Ordu	5	1			6
Osmaniye	2		2		4
Rize	3				3
Sakarya	5	1	1		7
Samsun	6	2	1		9
Siirt	2			1	3
Sinop	1	1			2
Sivas	4	1			5
Şanlıurfa	10			2	12
Şırnak	1			3	4
Tekirdağ	2	3	1		6
Tokat	3	1	1		5
Trabzon	4	1	1		6
Tunceli		2			2
Uşak	2	1			3
Van	4			4	8
Yalova	1	1			2
Yozgat	3		1		4
Zonguldak	3	2			5
Turkey total	327	135	53	35	550

== Analysis ==
The ruling party of Prime Minister Recep Tayyip Erdoğan won a third term in parliamentary elections. Erdoğan is the only prime minister in Turkish history to win three consecutive general elections and each time receive more votes than in the previous election. Four party groups will take their place in Turkey's new Parliament as electoral officials had counted all the votes. The ruling Justice and Development Party (AKP) will form a majority government after winning just a shade under 50 percent of the popular vote; the incumbents will be joined again by the opposition Republican People's Party (CHP), the Nationalist Movement Party (MHP) and the Peace and Democracy Party (BDP) in the legislature. The 327 seats won by AKP are slightly less than the 330 required to propose constitutional changes to a referendum without the support of other parties in parliament, and falls far short of the two-thirds majority needed to rewrite Turkey's 1982 military constitution unilaterally without the need for a referendum. A total of 73 AKP senior officials were elected for the last time in this election. The party's bylaws state that a person can run for Parliament for three consecutive terms at most. Prime Minister Recep Tayyip Erdogan, parliamentary Speaker Mehmet Ali Şahin, deputy prime ministers Bülent Arınç, Cemil Çiçek, Ali Babacan, ministers Beşir Atalay, Faruk Çelik, Mehmet Mehdi Eker, Sadullah Ergin, Egemen Bağış, Nimet Çubukçu, Hayati Yazıcı, Vecdi Gönül, Taner Yıldız, Nihat Ergün, Binali Yıldırım and Recep Akdağ are among those who will not be eligible for nomination in the next general election.

The second largest party in parliament, the Republican People's Party, won 25.9% of the vote. MHP won 13% of the vote, more than the 10% threshold required to win seats in Parliament. Thirty-five independent candidates, all of whom were backed by the Kurdish BDP under their Labour, Democracy and Freedom Bloc alliance (together with other parties, including the Rights and Freedoms Party, the Participatory Democracy Party and the Labour Party), were also voted in. Leyla Zana (50) returns to Parliament two decades after she was elected to the national assembly for the first time in 1991.

Erol Dora, a Syriac lawyer elected as independent but supported by the BDP, is the first ethnic Assyrian member of the Grand National Assembly and the first Christian MP since 1960 (the Armenian Migirdich Shellefyan was an MP in 1955–1960).

The number of female deputies was boosted from 46 to 78. With 44 female deputies, the AKP ranks the first. This term, there will be 20 female deputies from the opposition Republican People's Party (CHP), three from the Nationalist Movement Party (MHP) and 11 among the Kurdish Peace and Democracy (BDP)-backed independents in Parliament.

The oldest member of Parliament Oktay Ekşi from CHP, who was the youngest member of Constituent Assembly of 1961, will act as the parliamentary speaker temporarily during the oath ceremony. Bilal Macit (26) from AKP has become the youngest member of Parliament.

Hatip Dicle (BDP) was stripped of his seat after losing an appeal against a prior conviction for spreading terrorist propaganda. His seat went to Oya Eronat of the AKP. There are speculations that the remaining BDP MPs boycotted parliament because of this incident, but that attitude did not bring him to the parliament. Both AKP and CHP favoured amending the law in this case to allow Dicle to take his seat; a similar case had already applied to PM Erdoğan in 2003, when the law was also changed to allow for his seating.

Two CHP MPs, journalist Mustafa Balbay and academic Mehmet Haberal, were in jail at the time for suspected involvement in the Ergenekon conspiracy; applications for their release were denied, which was strongly criticized by the CHP, who said they would appeal the ruling.

BDP and CHP both boycotted parliament's opening ceremony, as Dicle had been stripped of his seat and eight other MPs were refused attendance due to prison terms considered political by both BDP and CHP.

== Reactions ==
=== International organisations ===
- Arab League - Secretary-General Amr Moussa congratulated Prime Minister Recep Tayyip Erdoğan, Foreign Minister Ahmet Davutoğlu and the Turkish people in this "historic moment". He also thanked the government of Turkey for opening the Turkish-Syrian border to Syrian refugees that fled the country.
- European Union - European Parliament's Turkey rapporteur Ria Oomen-Ruijten congratulated Erdoğan and AKP, and said that AKP government, which was elected for the third time, undertook an important responsibility. Ruijten wanted the government to be loyal to EU accession process and reforms. European Commission President Jose Manuel Barroso and President of the European Council Herman Van Rompuy sent a joint message to Erdoğan on his landslide election victory in Sunday's polls. "The results of the elections pave the way for the continuation of strengthening Turkey's democratic institutions as well as the modernization of the country", Barroso and Rompuy said. The President of the European Parliament (EP), Jerzy Buzek, congratulated Erdogan on Monday on the victory of the Justice and Development (AK) Party in Sunday's elections. In his message, Buzek underlined that such a great victory implied great need for responsibility in progressing for much needed reforms.
- Council of Europe - Parliamentary Assembly of the Council of Europe (PACE) President Mevlüt Çavuşoğlu said his respect for Erdoğan had increased and noted that the elections, in which he was also running, have been democratic and transparent.
- OIC - Speaking to AA in the British capital of London, OIC Secretary General Ekmeleddin Ihsanoglu commented on the results of Sunday's general elections in Turkey. "Turkish nation gives the necessary messages in every election. However, these messages should be read well by politicians and the new parliament, and actions should be taken accordingly. That is the most important thing", he said.

Others

- European People's Party (EPP) - The president of the EPP Wilfried Martens congratulated Recep Tayyip Erdoğan for his party's 3rd consecutive victory in parliamentary elections. "We hope that this new process will bring Turkey closer to the European Union", Martens said.
- Progressive Alliance of Socialists and Democrats (S&D) - The chairman of the S&D Martin Schulz welcomed the results of the general election. "This election result makes it possible for Turkey to maintain its political stability and to continue on the road to modernisation of the country with a view to further integration with the European Union", Schulz said.

=== Countries ===
- Afghanistan - President Hamid Karzai sent a message to Erdoğan congratulating him for the victory of the Justice and Development Party in Sunday's elections.
- Albania - President Bamir Topi sent a message to Erdoğan congratulating him for the victory. While Prime minister Sali Berisha also congratulated Erdogan for his victory.
- Azerbaijan - Azerbaijani President Ilham Aliyev called Erdoğan late Sunday to congratulate him on his victory by wide margin. Aliyev also invited Erdoğan to Azerbaijan for the joint consideration and further development of "our future possibilities of cooperation."
- China - Foreign ministry spokesperson Hong Lei congratulated Erdoğan. He said that the China–Turkey relations have improved in recent years and that the strategic partnership between the two countries began in 2010.
- Egypt - Prime Minister Essam Sharaf telephoned his Turkish counterpart to congratulate him on winning Turkey's parliamentary elections. The prime minister expressed Egypt's keenness on cementing relations with Turkey and exchanging expertise in all domains. Sharaf conveyed to Erdogan greetings from Field Marshal Mohamed Hussein Tantawi, the head of the Supreme Council of the Armed Forces.
- France - President Nicolas Sarkozy sent a congratulatory message to Erdogan on his victory in the elections. In his message, President Sarkozy said that he wanted to further strengthen Turkey-France cooperation. We affirmed our will to further strengthen our cooperation in all areas and to exchange views on global and regional issues during my visit to Ankara in February, he said. He said that France wanted to work with Turkey, one of its significant partners and allies, to ensure stability and prosperity in the region.
- Germany - Chancellor Angela Merkel congratulated Erdoğan in a letter and praised his modernization policy. "The result reflects the success of your modernization policy in the past years" she said.
- Georgia - President Mikheil Saakashvili congratulates Turkish Prime Minister on the Justice and Development Party (AKP)'s victory in the parliamentary elections. In a Monday message to Recep Tayyip Erdoğan, Saakashvili hailed the AKP's landslide victory in the elections.
- Greece - Prime Minister George Papandreou called Erdoğan on the phone and congratulated his victory.
- Italy - Prime Minister Silvio Berlusconi congratulated Erdoğan on the success of his party.
- Iran - President Mahmoud Ahmadinejad sent a message to Erdoğan, congratulating the premier on the election success of his Justice and Development Party in Sunday's polls.
- Iraq - President Jalal Talabani congratulated Erdoğan and said the poll results show that Turks see the AKP's management of the country as the best way for development and prosperity. He said the election results also prove that Turks support policies to solve problems related to ethnic and social issues and foreign policy that are based on freedom, justice and principles and values that require democracy.
- Israel - Prime Minister Benjamin Netanyahu had welcomed Turkey's "free and democratic" elections and wants to improve the relations. "We are pleased because in this region there is rarely a guarantee that free and fair elections exist" he said.
- Kazakhstan - Prime Minister Karim Masimov sent a message to Erdoğan on Monday congratulating him over the election success of his Justice and Development Party in Sunday's polls.
- Kyrgyzstan - Prime Minister Almazbek Atambayev congratulated Erdoğan and underlined Turkey's development under the "smart management" of the prime minister as the factor that led to the success and prosperity of the Turkish people.
- Lebanon - former Prime Minister Saad Hariri contacted Turkish Prime Minister Recep Tayyip Erdoğan to congratulate him on his victory and his party's success in Turkey's legislative elections on Sunday, according to a statement issued by Hariri's office.
- Mexico - President Felipe de Jesus Calderon called Erdogan on the phone and congratulated him.
- Oman - Sultan Qaboos bin Said Al Said has sent a cable of congratulations to Recep Tayyip Erdogan, Prime Minister of Turkey and Chairman of the ruling Justice and Development Party, on the occasion of his party's victory in the legislative elections that took place Turkey. His Majesty the Sultan expressed his sincere congratulations, along with his best wishes of success to Erdogan, hoping he will achieve further progress for the friendly people of Turkey.
- Pakistan - Prime Minister Yousaf Raza Gillani telephoned his Turkish counterpart to felicitate him over his party's successive victory in the elections. Congratulating the Turkish Prime Minister on behalf of the people and the government of Pakistan as well as his own and on behalf of his family, Prime Minister Gilani said that AKP's impressive electoral success shows a victory for democracy. He further said that "this win of his party in third consecutive elections speaks volumes about the trust Turkish people repose in his leadership and the government's policies." The Prime Minister hoped that the relations with Turkey would further be strengthened under the stewardship of Erdoğan as both brotherly nations have mutuality of views on regional and international issues.
- Palestine - President Mahmud Abbas sent a letter to Turkish President Abdullah Gul and Prime Minister Recep Tayyip Erdoğan, leader of the AKP, congratulating them for winning the elections. Abbas also praised "Turkey's firmly established positions and its support to our people and our struggle for freedom and the establishment of the independent Palestinian state."
- Qatar - Sheikh Hamad bin Khalifa Al Thani held talks on the phone with Turkey's President Abdullah Gul and Prime Minister Recep Tayyip Erdogan. During the conversations, the Emir congratulated them for the victory of the Justice and Development Party (AKP) in the parliamentary elections held on Sunday besides discussing relations between Qatar and Turkey.
- Russia - Prime Minister Vladimir Putin congratulated Erdogan on the victory of his party at the elections. "The voting results are evidence of the wide recognition of your personal merits as a prime minister and of the real achievements that have been made in the social and economic areas of the Turkish Republic. I would particularly like to highlight the major contribution that you and your party have been making to strengthening partner relations between our countries. For its part, Russia is ready and willing to cooperate closely with you to further promote mutually beneficial partnership. From the very bottom of my heart, I wish you health and happiness, and new achievements and victories to the Justice and Development Party" he said. President Dmitry Medvedev also congratulated Erdogan on his party's victory. According to the Russian President, Russian-Turkish relations during the AKP's rule were developing successfully and the Kremlin looks forward to cooperating with the Turkish authorities in various fields.
- Spain - Prime Minister José Luis Rodríguez Zapatero sent a letter to his Turkish counterpart on Sunday night congratulating him for the victory of the Justice and Development Party in Sunday's elections. In his letter, Zapatero said that the "three back to back victories of the AKP is a clear indication of the confidence the Turkish people have in Erdoğan and his administration". Zapatero said that relations between Spain and Turkey were "excellent" and that the new term in Turkey will provide an opportunity to further strengthen the relations between the two countries.
- Sweden - Foreign Minister Carl Bildt said that the elections in Turkey ended with an impressive victory for Prime Minister Recep Tayyip Erdogan and the Justice and Development Party. In a note posted on his internet site, Bildt said that the election victory was a reason to congratulate Erdogan and his party. Turkey's growing economy, active foreign policy, and stance on the developments taking place in the Arabic world recently have led Turkey's people to extend a strong support to the future. What is crucial from now on is a new and more democratic constitution, Bildt said.
- Syria - President Bashar al-Assad congratulated Erdogan on his victory in the parliamentary elections during a phone conversation. The conversation, which began as a congratulatory call from Assad to Erdogan over his election victory, turned to the topic of violence and reforms in Syria. Erdogan told Assad he must make a timetable for reforms, and implement them urgently. The next day, President Bashar al-Assad send a special delegation led by Hasan Turkmani to the Turkish capital of Ankara to meet Turkish Prime Minister Recep Tayyip Erdogan.
- Ukraine - President Viktor Yanukovych has congratulated Erdogan in a letter posted on his official website. "This success is a sign of the support by the Turkish people of the efforts that your political party and you personally are taking to develop a democratic Turkish state and ensure the interests of the Turkish people", he wrote. The president noted that Ukraine wanted to strengthen friendly relations with Turkey and deepen their strategic partnership, which was launched during the Turkish prime minister's recent visit to Kyiv.
- United Arab Emirates - President Khalifa bin Zayed Al Nahyan sent a congratulatory cable to Turkish prime minister Recep Tayyip Erdogan. His Highness Shaikh Mohammed bin Rashid Al Maktoum, Vice-President and Prime Minister of the UAE and Ruler of Dubai, also sent a similar cable to Erdogan. General Shaikh Mohammed bin Zayed Al Nahyan, Crown Prince of Abu Dhabi and Deputy Supreme Commander of the UAE Armed Forces, also congratulated the Turkish PM on the parliamentary victory.
- United Kingdom - Prime Minister David Cameron called Erdoğan on the phone and congratulated his victory. The leaders also agreed there needs to be a united and determined international approach to pressure Libyan leader Muammar Gaddafi. Cameron told Erdoğan that he is pleased with Turkey's leadership role, particularly in coordinating and hosting the Libya Contact Group in Turkey next month.
- United States - President Barack Obama called Turkish prime minister from his plane en route to Puerto Rico from Miami to congratulate him on historic electoral victory with 50 percent of vote that won him the third term. "He called to congratulate the prime minister on his party's victory in the parliamentary elections", White House spokesman Jay Carney said

Others

- Northern Cyprus - President Dervis Eroglu sent a message to Erdoğan and congratulated Erdoğan on the victory Justice & Development Party won in Sunday's parliamentary elections. "On behalf of Turkish Cypriot people, I sincerely congratulate you on recording a great success on 12 June parliamentary elections and on gaining the opportunity to form a government on your own", Eroglu said.
- Kosovo - Prime Minister Hashim Thaci congratulated Erdoğan and said the guarantee of Turkey's success lay under the prime minister's determination in strengthening the rapid development of Turkey and pushing for good neighborly relations, peace, stability and cooperation among countries in the region.

== See also ==
- 24th Parliament of Turkey
