= List of MPs who stood down at the June 2015 Turkish general election =

This is a list of Turkish Members of Parliament who did not seek re-election in the June 2015 general election. Only MPs who have not applied for renomination are listed. MPs of the 24th Parliament who applied to become candidates but failed to make it onto their party's lists are not included.

== AKP three-term limit ==
A Justice and Development Party (AKP) by-law dictates that members of parliament can only serve 3 successive terms from AKP lists. Therefore, 70 of AKP's 312 MPs will have to stand down in the 2015 elections, which includes 9 members of the Davutoğlu Cabinet and other prominent AKP people who have been MPs since 2002. A farewell ceremony and feast was held on 31 March 2015 for the outgoing MPs who had served for three terms.

- Ömer Çelik, Adana
- Mehmet Necati Çetinkaya, Adana
- Ali Küçükaydın, Adana
- Sait Açba, Afyonkarahisar
- Ruhi Açıkgöz, Aksaray
- Ali Rıza Alaboyun, Aksaray
- Ali Babacan, Ankara (I)
- Reha Denemeç, Ankara (I)
- Bülent Gedikli, Ankara (I)
- Cemil Çiçek, Ankara (II)
- Cevdet Erdöl, Ankara (II)
- Haluk İpek, Ankara (II)
- Salih Kapusuz, Ankara (II)
- Mevlüt Çavuşoğlu, Antalya
- Mehmet Vecdi Gönül, Antalya
- Fahrettin Poyraz, Bilecik
- Vahit Kiler, Bitlis
- Bayram Özçelik, Burdur
- Bülent Arınç, Bursa
- Mehmet Danış, Çanakkale
- Murat Yıldırım, Çorum
- Mehmet Mehdi Eker, Diyarbakır
- Recep Akdağ, Erzurum
- Hüseyin Çelik, Gaziantep
- Mehmet Sarı, Gaziantep
- Nurettin Canikli, Giresun
- Sadullah Ergin, Hatay
- Mustafa Ataş, İstanbul (I)
- Egemen Bağış, İstanbul (I)
- Nimet Baş, İstanbul (II)
- Burhan Kuzu, İstanbul (II)
- Abdülkadir Aksu, İstanbul (III)
- Halide İncekara, İstanbul (III)
- Ünal Kaçır, İstanbul (III)
- Mehmet Sayım Tekelioğlu, İzmir (I)
- Binali Yıldırım, İzmir (II)
- Nevzat Pakdil, Kahramanmaraş
- Mehmet Ali Şahin, Karabük
- Mevlüt Akgün, Karaman
- Hakkı Köylü, Kastamonu
- Mustafa Elitaş, Kayseri
- Sadık Yakut, Kayseri
- Taner Yıldız, Kayseri
- Beşir Atalay, Kırıkkale
- Muzaffer Baştopçu, Kocaeli
- Nihat Ergün, Kocaeli
- Kerim Özkul, Konya
- Harun Tüfekçi, Konya
- Soner Aksoy, Kütahya
- Hasan Fehmi Kinay, Kütahya
- Hüseyin Tanrıverd, Manisa
- Durdu Mehmet Kasdal, Osmaniye
- Nusret Bayraktar, Rize
- Hayati Yazıcı, Rize
- Hasan Ali Çelik, Sakarya
- Şaban Dişli, Sakarya
- Ayhan Sefer Üstün, Sakarya
- Cemal Yılmaz Demir, Samsun
- Mustafa Demir, Samsun
- Suat Kılıç, Samsun
- Ahmet Yeni, Samsun
- Afif Demirkıran, Siirt
- Yahya Akman, Şanlıurfa
- Faruk Çelik, Şanlıurfa
- Tevfik Ziyaeddin Akbulut, Tekirdağ
- Zeyid Aslan, Tokat
- Şükrü Ayala, Tokat
- Faruk Nafız Özak, Trabzon
- Bekir Bozdağ, Yozgat
- Köksal Toptan, Zonguldak
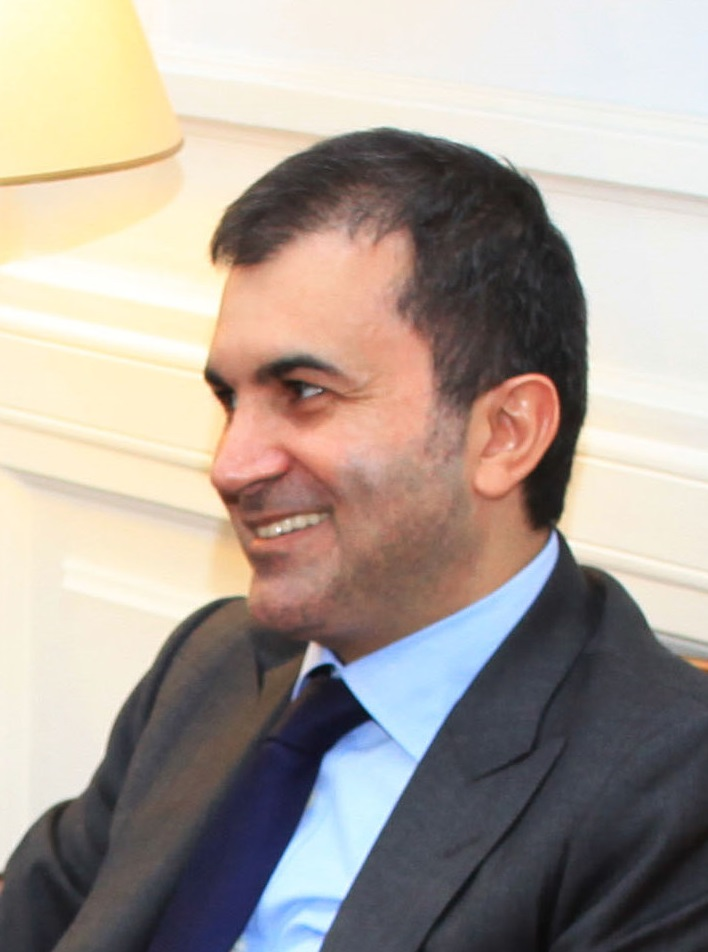
Ömer Çelik, Minister of Culture and Tourism

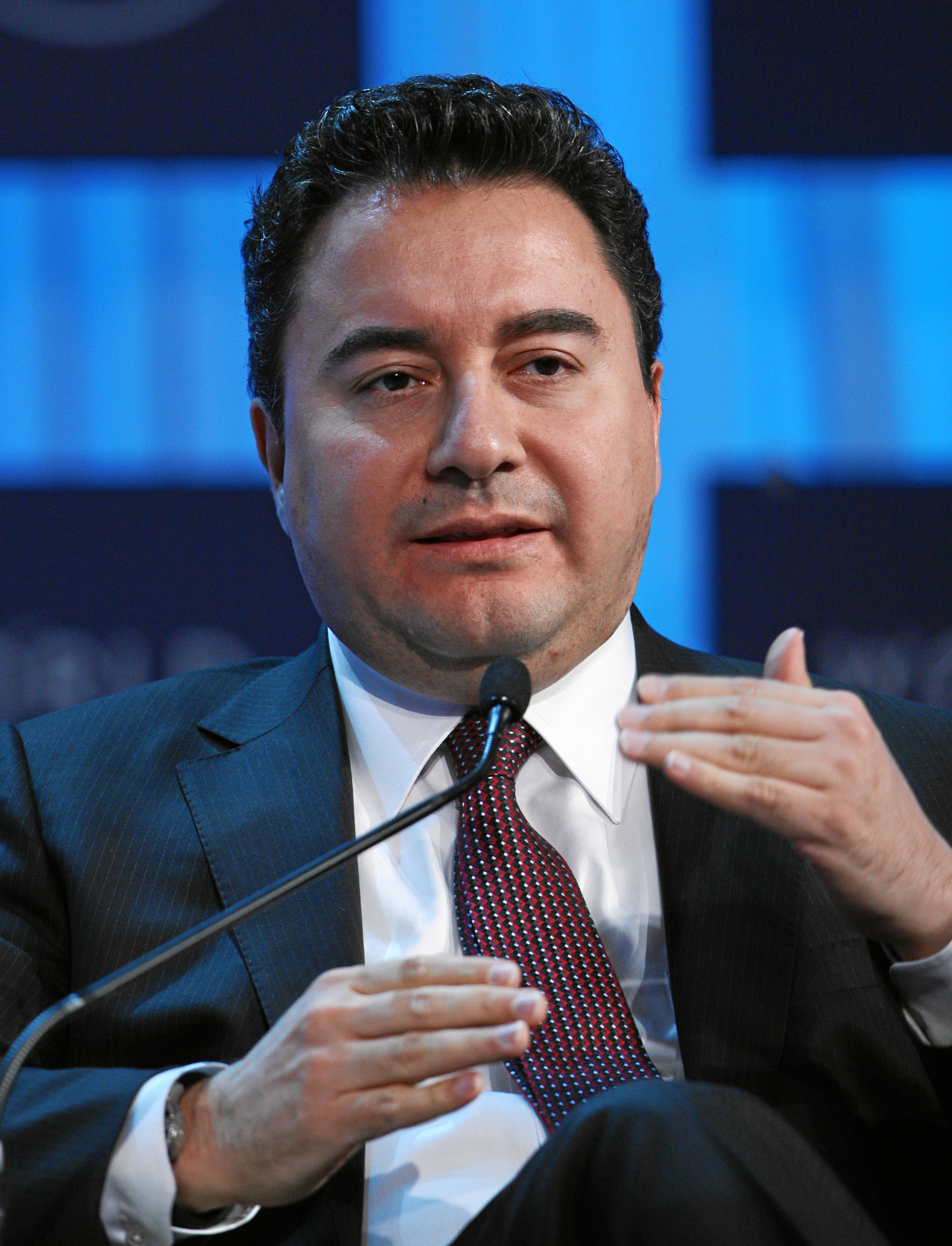
Ali Babacan, Deputy Prime Minister of Turkey

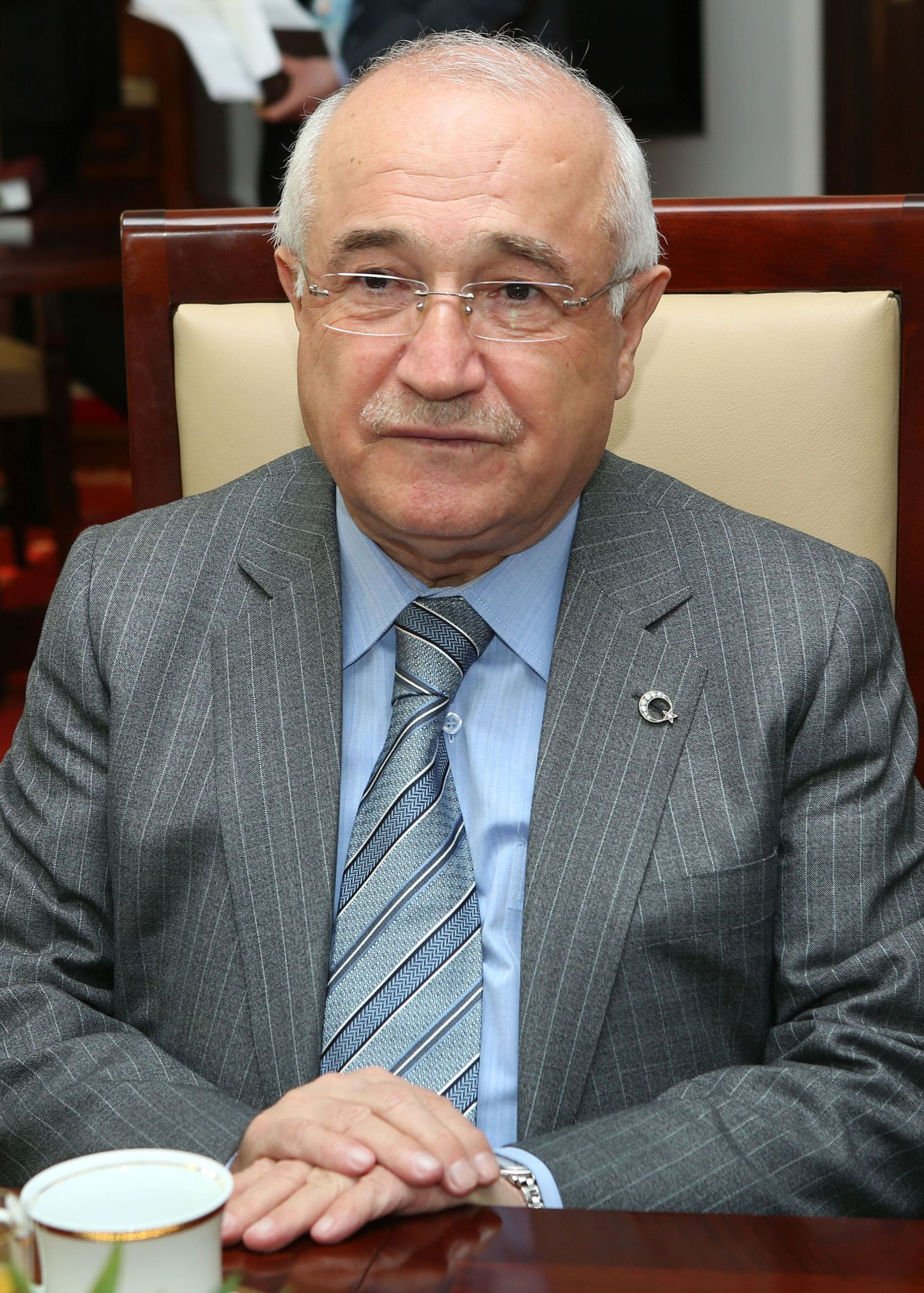
Cemil Çiçek, Speaker of the Grand National Assembly

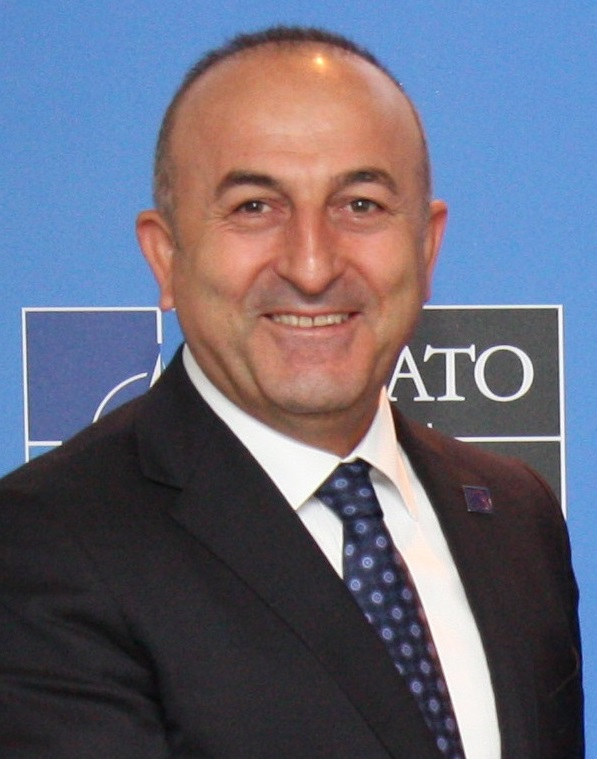
Mevlüt Çavuşoğlu, Minister of Foreign Affairs

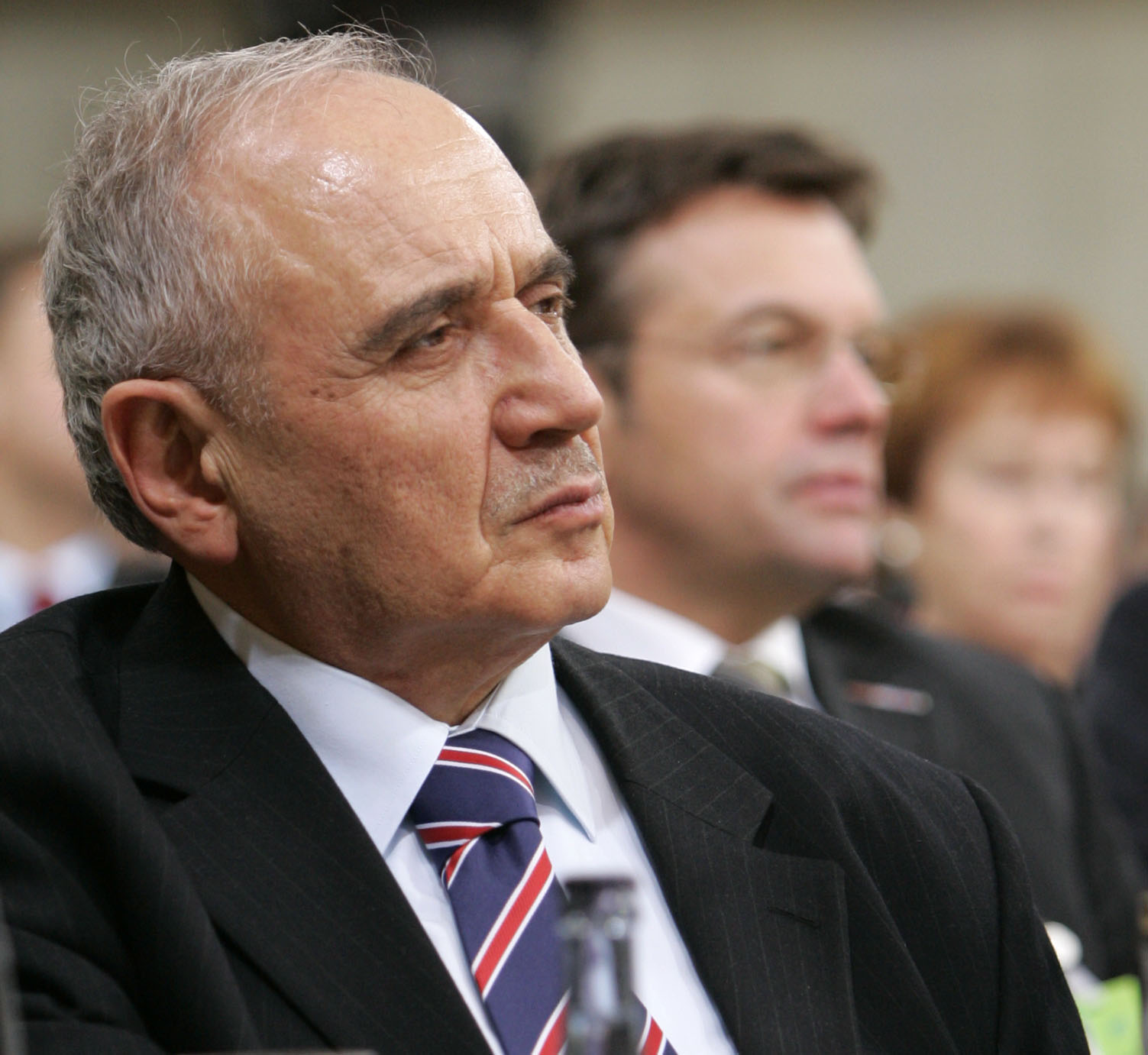
Vecdi Gönül, former Minister of National Defence

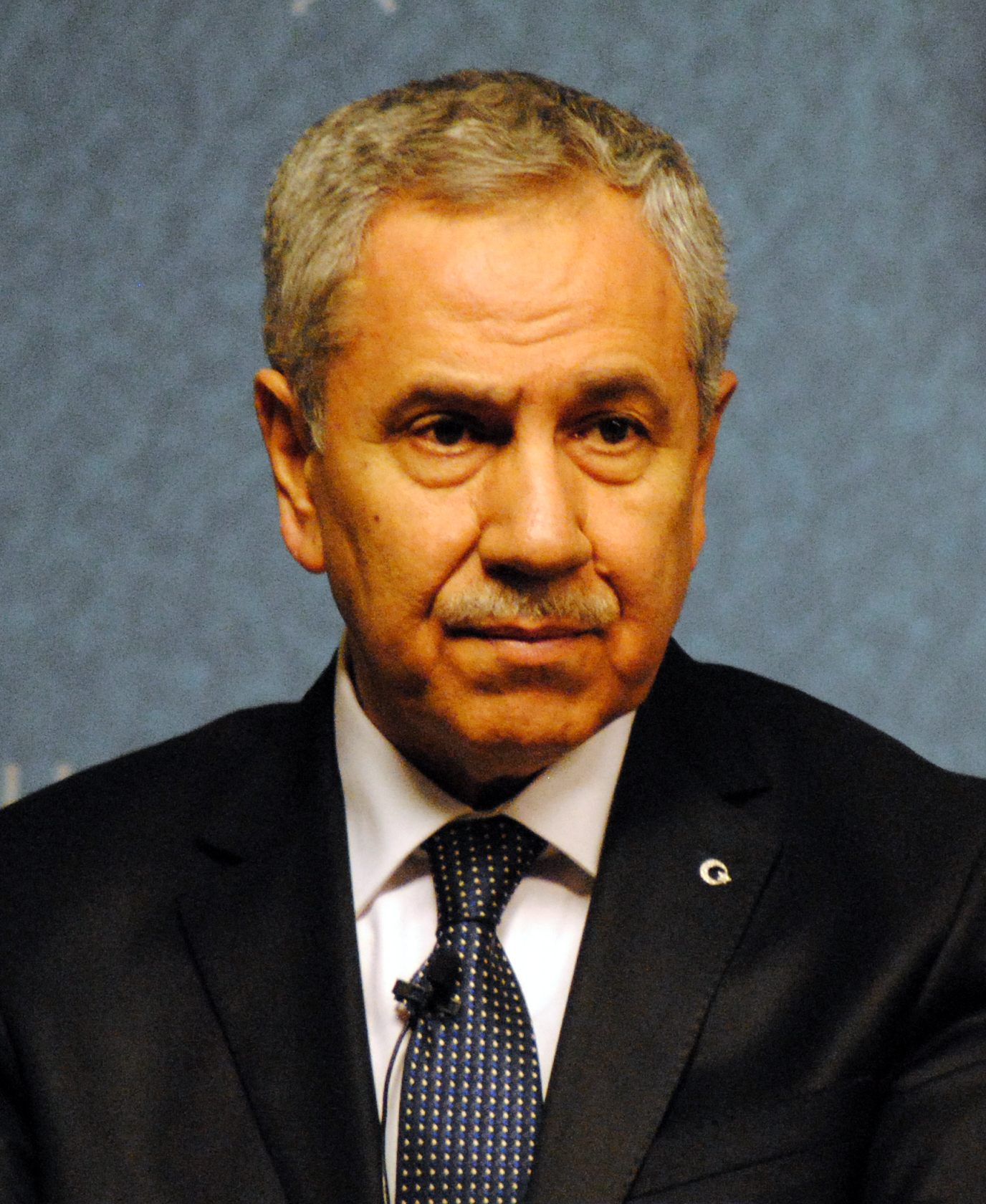
Bülent Arınç, Deputy Prime Minister of Turkey

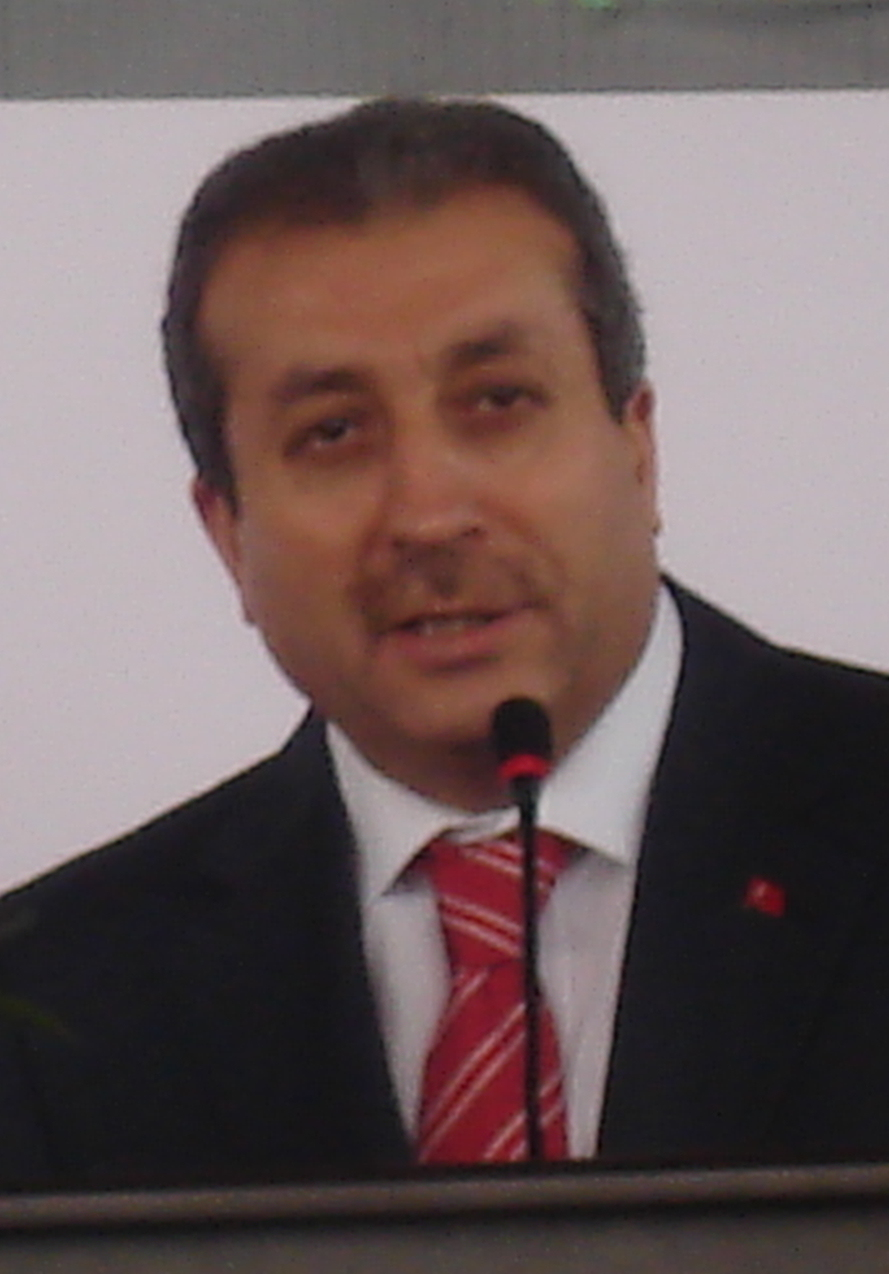
Mehmet Mehdi Eker, Minister of Food, Agriculture and Livestock

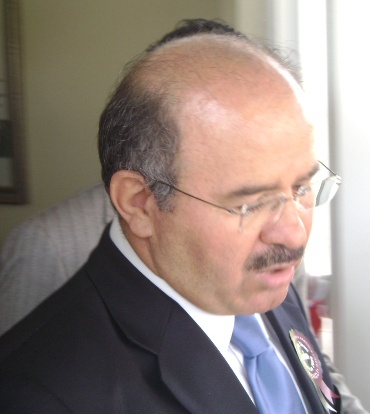
Hüseyin Çelik, former Minister of National Education

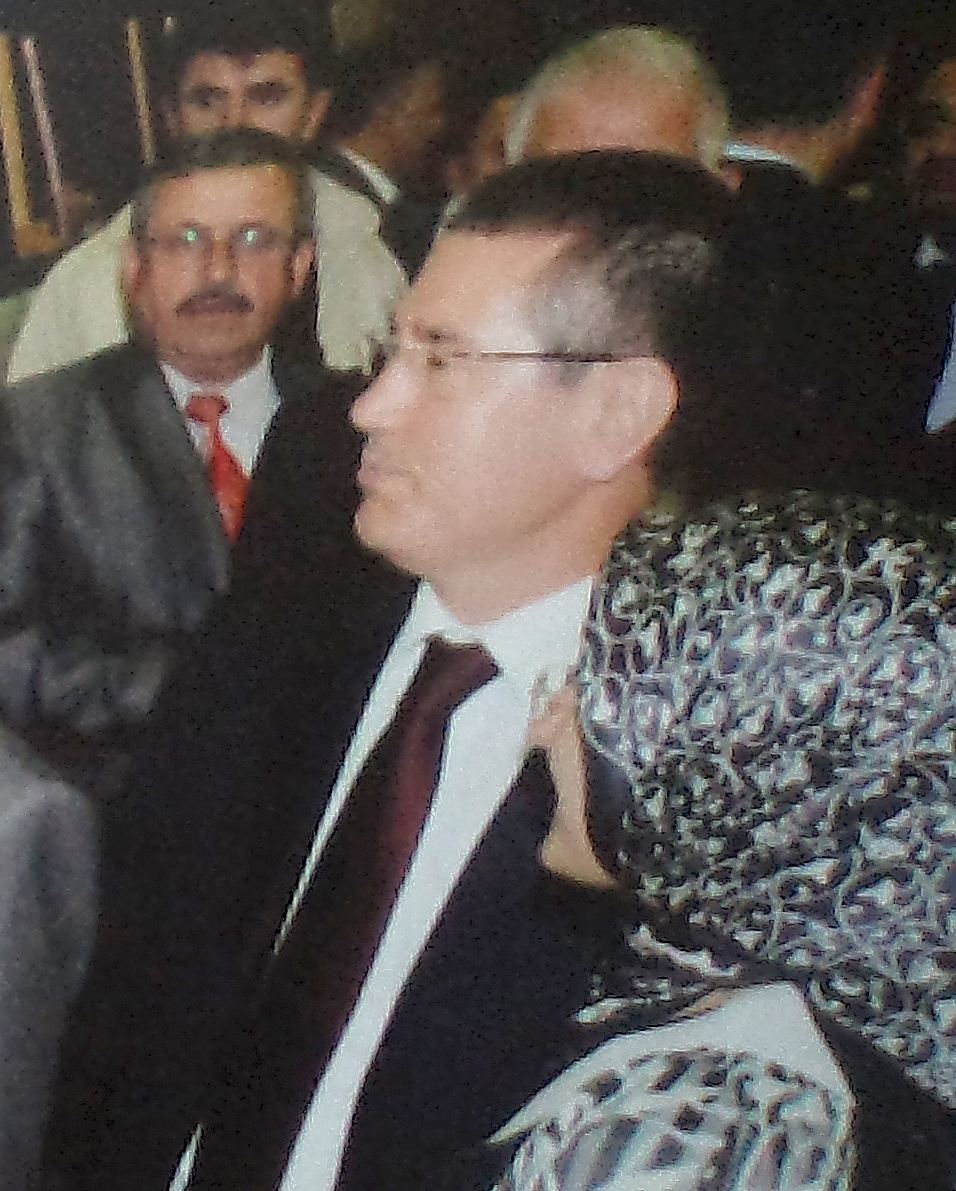
Nurettin Canikli, Minister of Customs and Trade

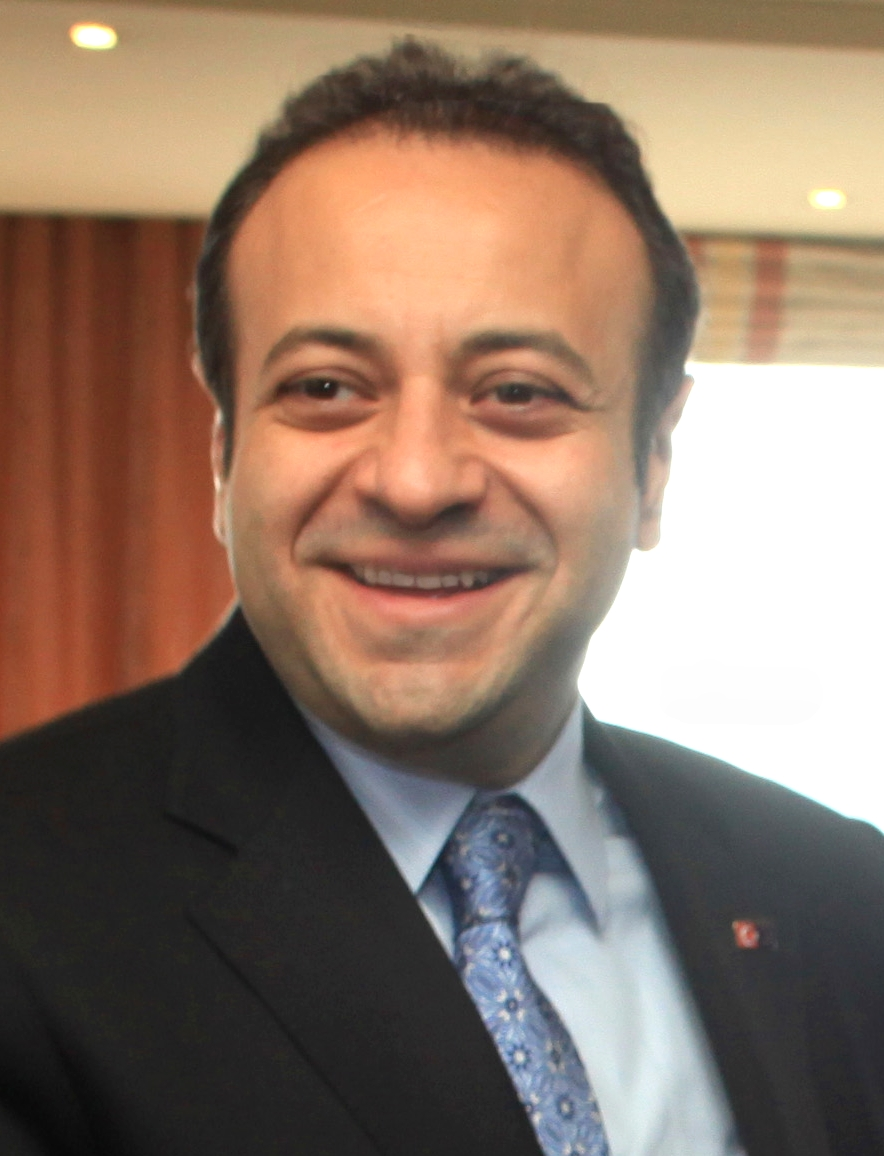
Egemen Bağış, former Minister of European Union Affairs

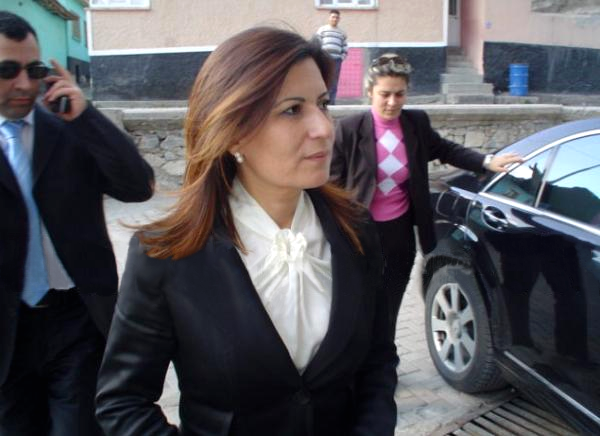
Nimet Baş, former Minister of National Education

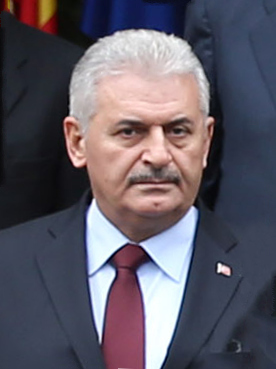
Binali Yıldırım, former Minister of Transport, Maritime and Communication

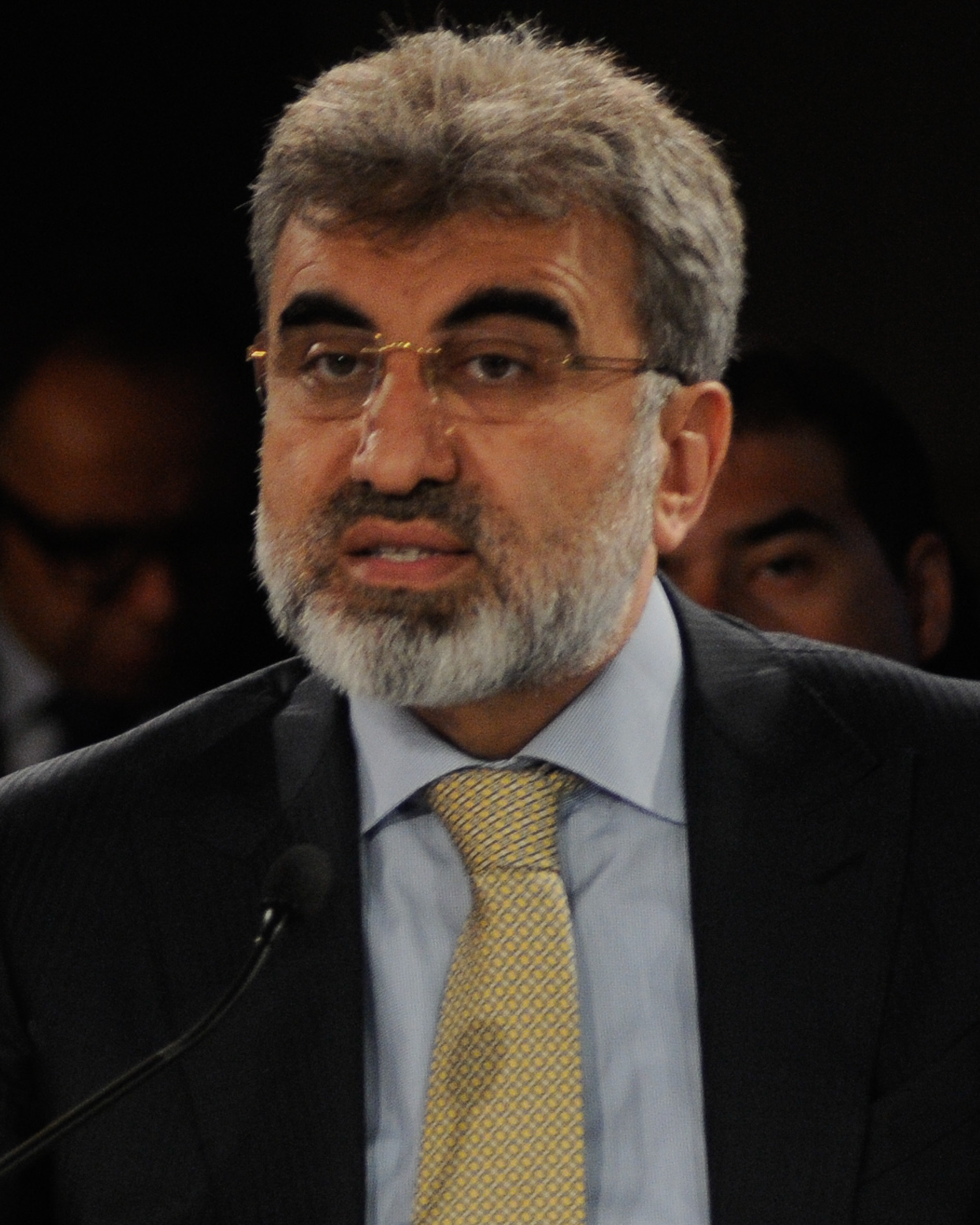
Taner Yıldız, Minister of Energy and Natural Resources

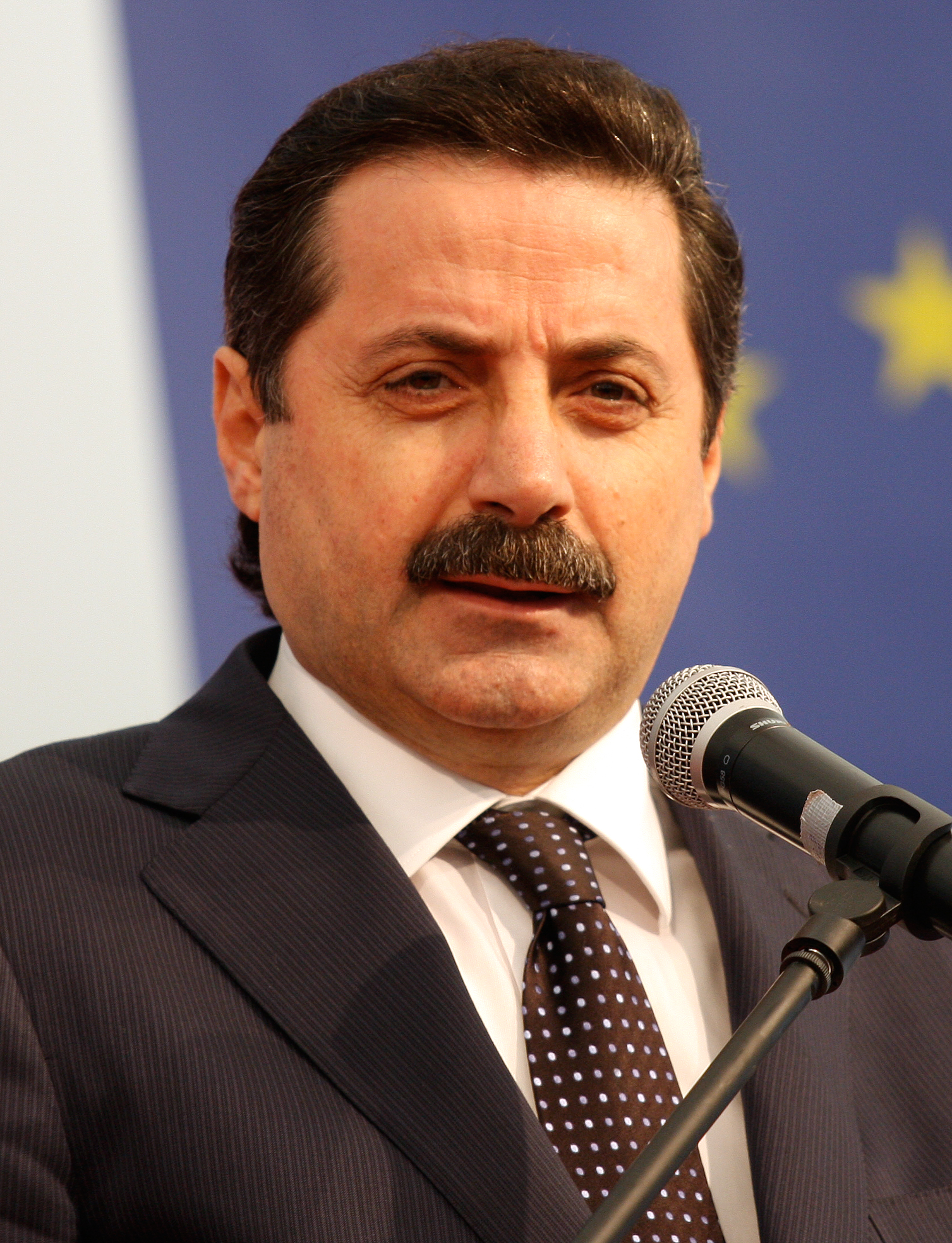
Faruk Çelik, Minister of Labour and Social Security

== HDP two-term limit ==
The Peoples' Democratic Party (HDP) party constitution imposes a two-term limit on elected members who have served under the banner of the HDP or its predecessor Peace and Democracy Party (BDP). This means that eight HDP MPs who served throughout the 24th Parliament cannot stand for re-election. The members who are barred from standing due to the two-term limit are as follows.

- Aysel Tuğluk, Van
- Emine Ayna, Diyarbakır
- Ayla Akat Ata, Batman
- Bengi Yıldız, Batman
- Sebahat Tuncel, İstanbul (I)
- İbrahim Binici, Şanlıurfa
- Hasip Kaplan, Şırnak
- Özdal Üçer, Van
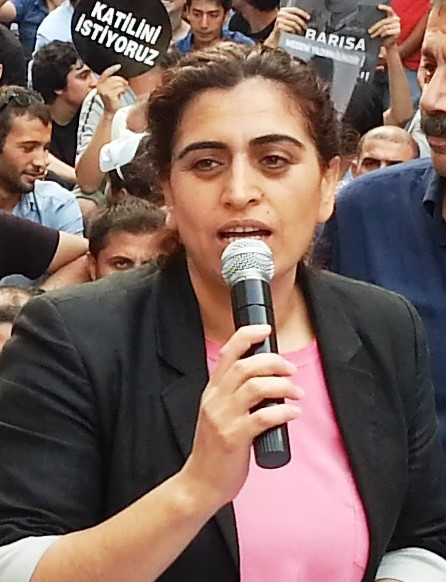
Sebahat Tuncel, Honorary President of the Peoples' Democratic Party

== MPs not seeking re-election ==
The following MPs who were able to stand again for their party, but decided not to seek re-election.

=== Justice and Development Party ===
- Erdoğan Bayraktar, Trabzon
- Zafer Çağlayan, Mersin
- Ömer Dinçer, İstanbul (III)
- Gürsoy Erol, İstanbul (I)
- Azize Sibel Gönül, Kocaeli
- Muammer Güler, Mardin
- Nursuna Memecan, Sivas
- Yıldırım Mehmet Ramazanoğlu, Kahramanmaraş
- Mehmet Kerim Yıldız, Ağrı
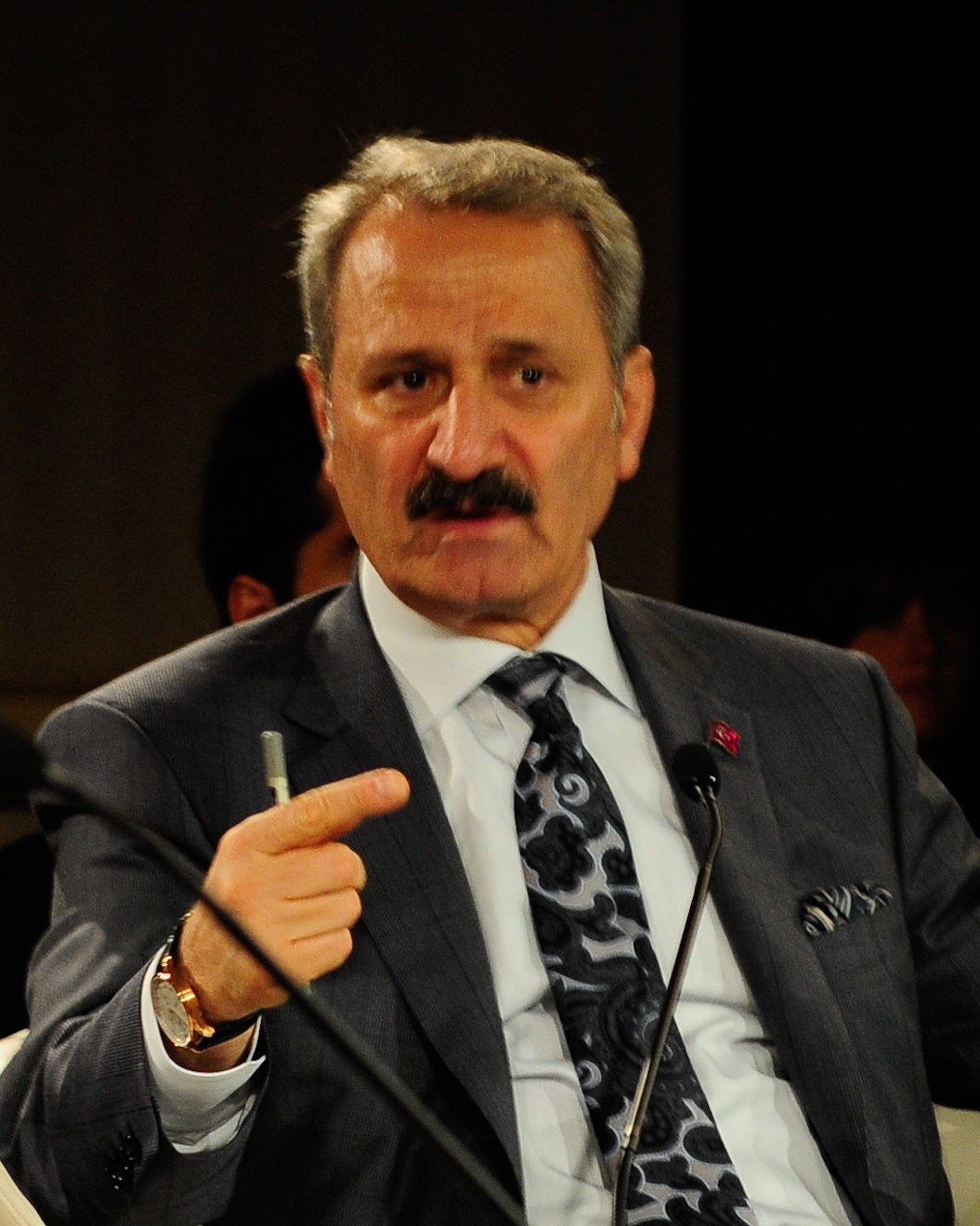
Zafer Çağlayan, former Minister of Economic Affairs

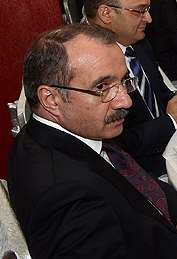
Ömer Dinçer, former National Education Minister and Labour and Social Security Minister

=== Republican People's Party ===
- Hüseyin Aygün, Tunceli
- Aykan Erdemir, Bursa
- Oğuz Oyan, İzmir (I)
- Alaattin Yüksel, İzmir (II)
- Oktay Ekşi, İstanbul (III)
- Şevki Kulkuloğlu, Kayseri
- Sabahat Akkiraz, İstanbul (III)
- Osman Aydın, Aydın
- Kemal Ekinci, Bursa
- Mehmet Haberal, Zonguldak
- Osman Kaptan, Antalya
- Turhan Tayan, Bursa
- Binnaz Toprak, İstanbul (III)
- İhsan Kalkavan, Samsun
- Süheyl Batum, Eskişehir
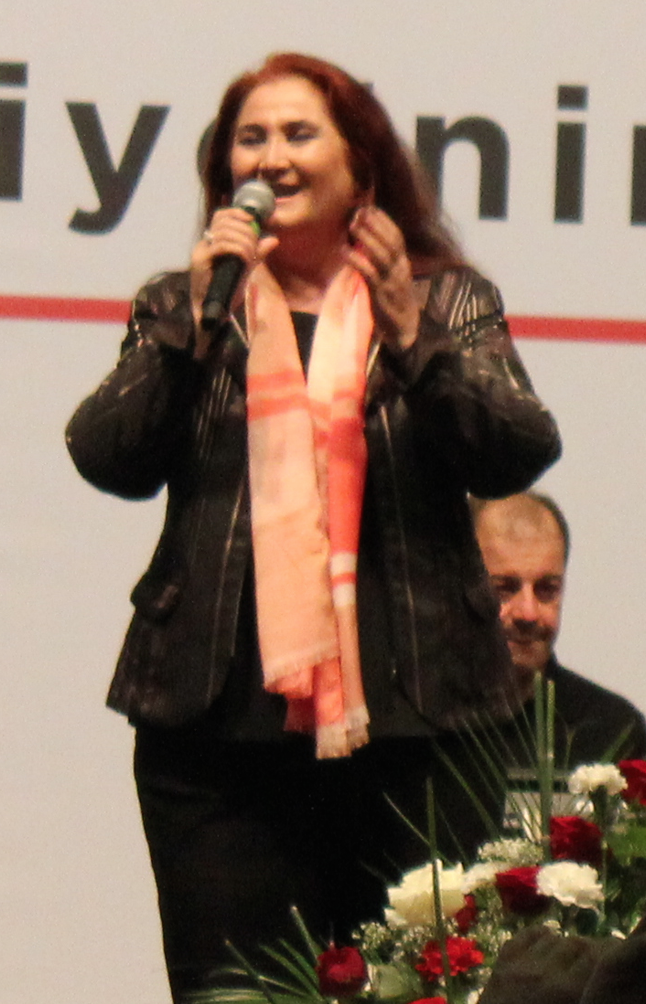
Sabahat Akkiraz, MP for İstanbul's 3rd electoral district

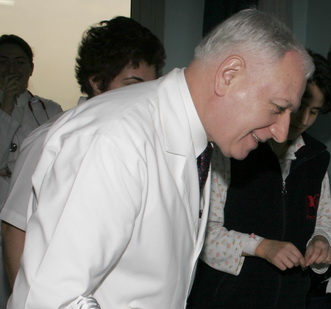
Mehmet Haberal, MP for Zonguldak

=== Nationalist Movement Party ===
- Tunca Toskay, Antalya
- Enver Erdem, Elazığ
- Sinan Oğan, Iğdır
- Engin Alan, İstanbul (I)
- Sümer Oral, Manisa
- Reşat Doğru, Tokat
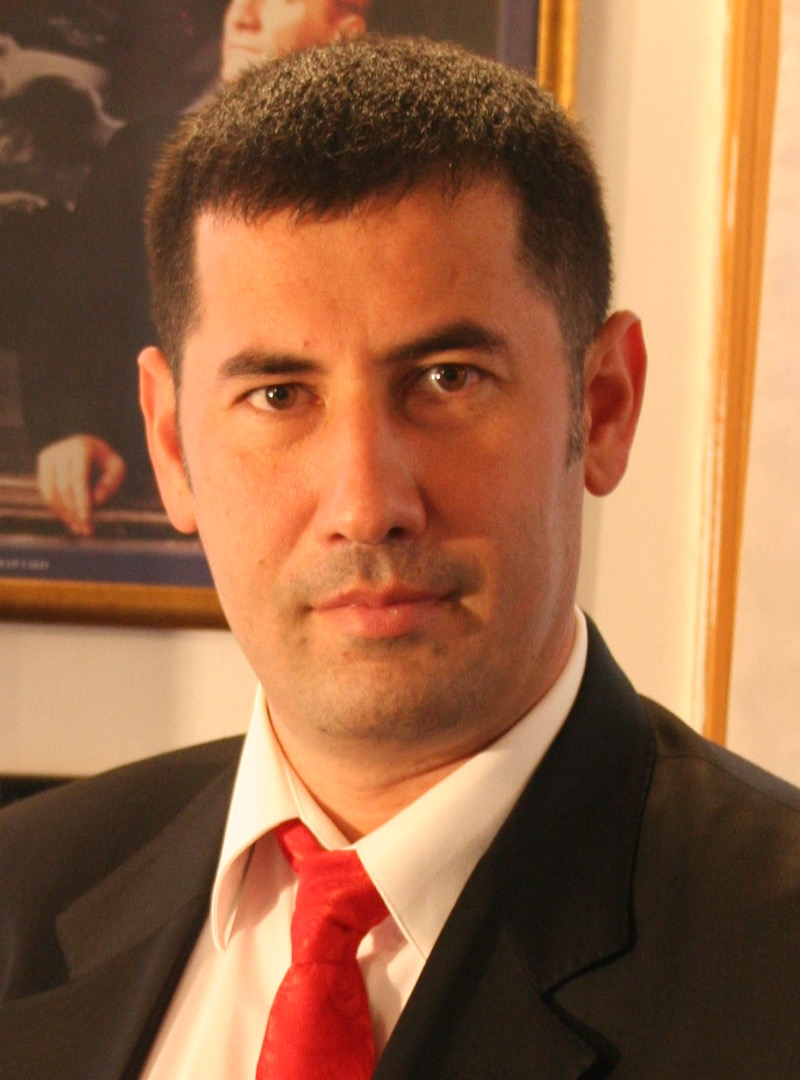
Sinan Oğan, MP for Iğdır

=== Independents ===
- Nazmi Haluk Özdalga, Ankara (I)
- Hasan Hami Yıldırım, Budur
- İdris Bal, Kütahya
- İhsan Barutçu, İstanbul (III)
- Muhammed Çetin, İstanbul (I)
- Birgül Ayman Güler, İzmir (II)
- Ertuğrul Günay, İzmir (I)
- Erdal Kalkan, İzmir (II)
- Ahmet Öksüzkaya, Kayseri
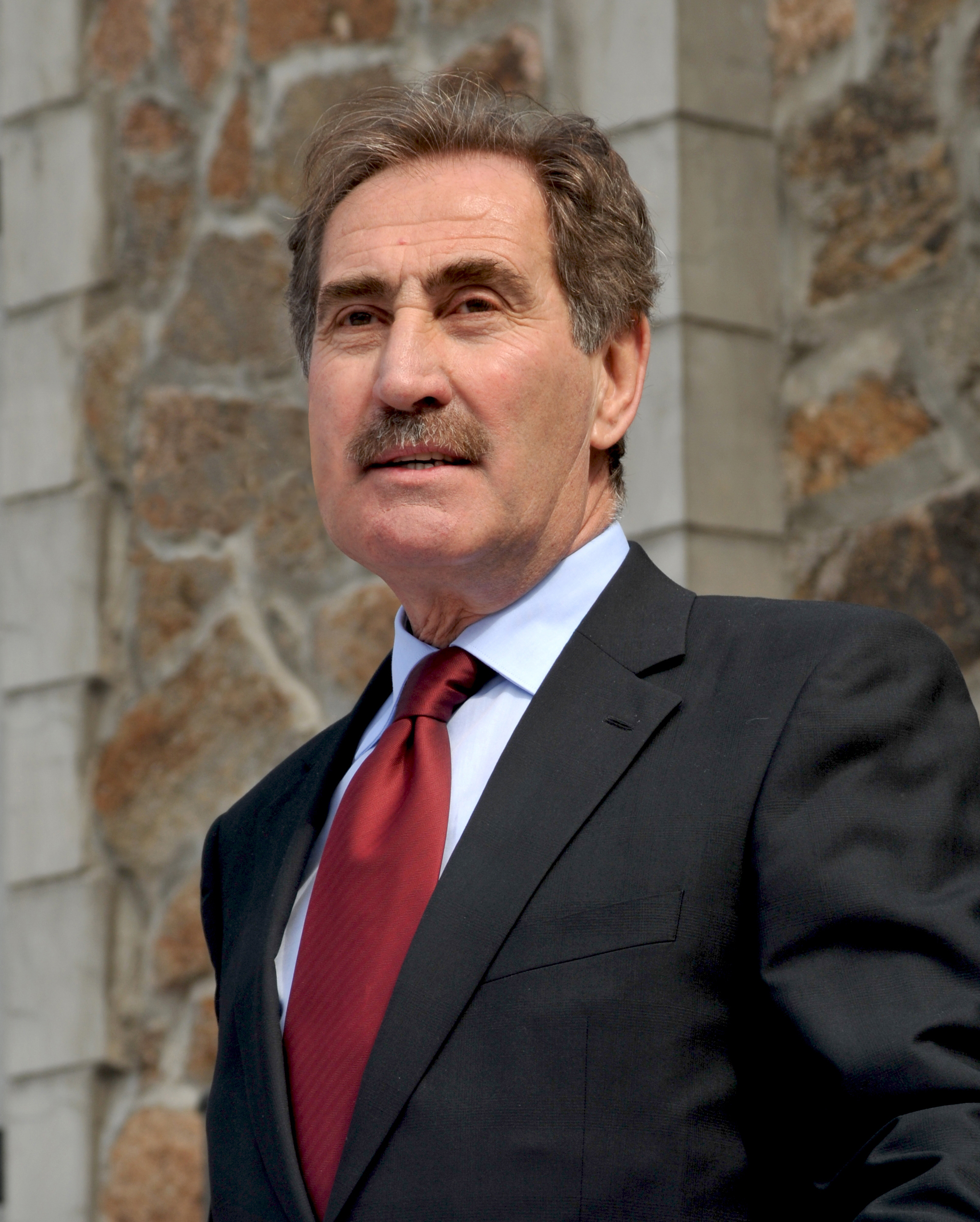
Ertuğrul Günay, former AKP Minister of Culture and Tourism
