= 2017 Turkish Parliament Speaker election =

2017 Turkish Parliament Speaker elections
← Nov 2015	20 November 2017	2018 →

543 of 550 Members of Parliament voting in the Grand National Assembly 367 votes needed to win in the first two rounds 276 votes needed to win in the third round
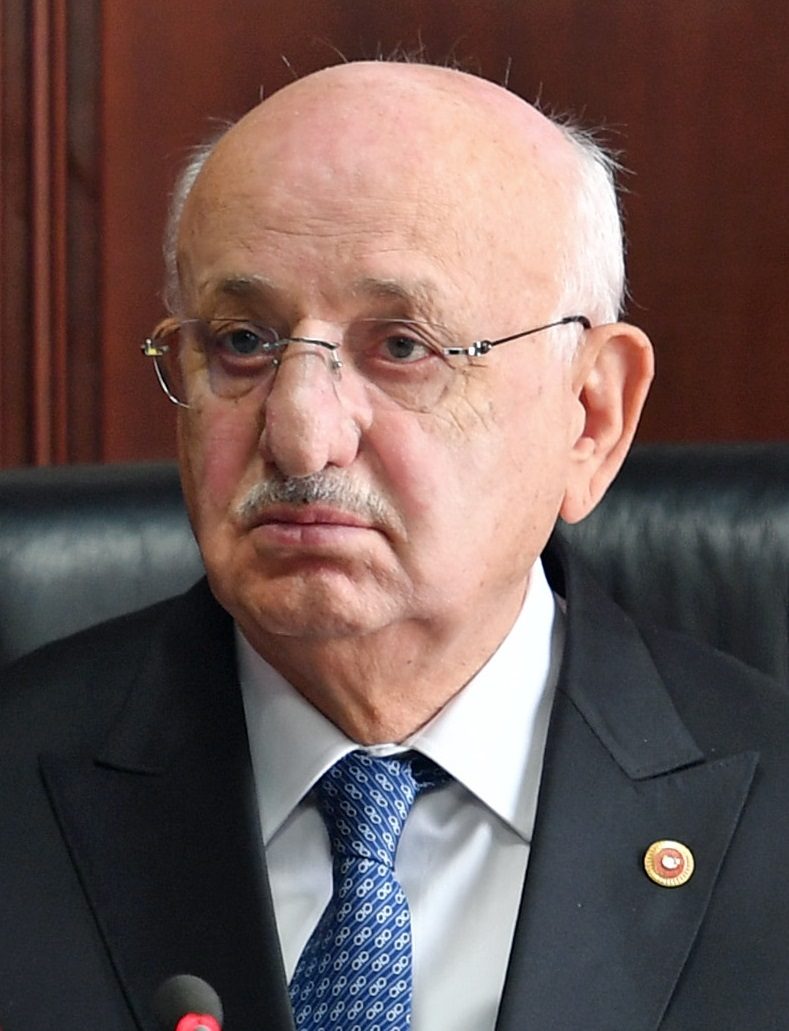

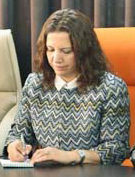

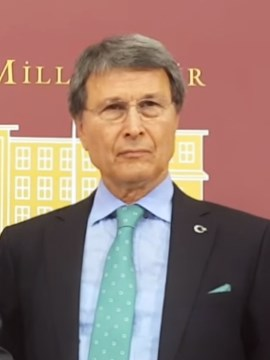
Nominee	İsmail Kahraman	Zekeriya Temizel	Celal Adan
Party	AK Party	CHP	MHP
Constituency	İstanbul (I)	İzmir (II)	İstanbul (II)
Round 1	260 (52.4%)	113 (22.8%)	40 (8.1%)
Round 2	257 (51.3%)	122 (24.4%)	40 (8.0%)
Round 3	289 (58.6%)	124 (25.2%)	36 (7.3%)
Nominee	Selma Irmak	Tamer Dağlı	Yusuf Halaçoğlu
Party	HDP	AK Party	İYİ
Constituency	Hakkâri	Adana	Kayseri
Round 1	39 (7.9%)	38 (7.7%)	6 (1.2%)
Round 2	38 (7.6%)	37 (7.4%)	7 (1.4%)
Round 3	37 (7.5%)	Withdrew	7 (1.4%)
Speaker before election
İsmail Kahraman
AK Party
Elected Speaker
İsmail Kahraman
AK Party

The mid-term Turkish Parliament Speaker elections of 2017 were held on 20 November 2017 in order to elect the Speaker of the Grand National Assembly. The election took place in three rounds, with a fourth becoming unnecessary after incumbent Speaker İsmail Kahraman was re-elected with 289 votes.

A total of six candidates stood for election, with the Justice and Development Party (AKP) both re-nominating incumbent speaker İsmail Kahraman and also nominating Tamer Dağlı as a 'back-up candidate' in case there was a deterioration in Kahraman's health. The Republican People's Party (CHP) nominated Zekeriya Temizel, Nationalist Movement Party (MHP) nominated Celal Adan while the Peoples' Democratic Party (HDP) nominated imprisoned MP Selma Irmak. The İYİ Party, established less than a month before the election by Meral Akşener, nominated Yusuf Halaçoğlu.

To protest the inability of their imprisoned MPs to vote and participate in parliamentary proceedings, the HDP nominated one of their imprisoned MPs. The AKP's back-up candidate Tamer Dağlı withdrew before the third round to allow Kahraman to have a clear path to victory.

== Election process ==
Elections for the Speaker of the Grand National Assembly are held every two years, once at the start of the parliamentary term (immediately after elections) and one in the half-way through.

The Speaker is elected by secret ballot through a maximum of four rounds held within Parliament, with a two-thirds majority of 367 votes to be elected outright in the first two rounds. If the election goes into a third round, the votes needed to win is lowered to a simple majority (276) votes. If the election goes into a fourth round, the top two candidates who won the most votes in the third round contest a run-off, with the candidate winning the highest number of votes being elected.

The vote is held via a secret ballot. The incumbent speaker, on grounds of neutrality, is not allowed to participate. This meant that the despite having 316 seats in parliament, the AKP only has 315 voting-eligible MPs.

== Candidates ==
=== Potential candidates ===
Before the election, there was speculation over whether Kahraman would be the AKP's candidate, given frictions within the party and a desire for change. It was later reported that the party had suffered long arguments over whether to renominate Kahraman and that it was eventually decided that it would support him should he personally wish to run for re-election. His eventual candidacy resulted in AKP officials attempting to convince Burhan Kuzu, who has expressed a long public desire in becoming speaker, to rule himself out from running without his party's support. Kuzu openly expressed his resentment as a result.

=== AKP 'back-up' candidate ===
The AKP implemented a 'back-up candidate' strategy for the speaker election, which involved nominating a 2nd candidate in the event of unforeseen circumstances, such as a worsening in Kahraman's health. The candidate was chosen alphabetically, from Adana (which is first alphabetically in Turkey's list of electoral districts), with Tamer Dağlı at the top of the list (below Ömer Çelik, who wasn't able to run since he is a government minister). The lottery system put in place was likened to choosing a name out of a hat, and Dağlı earned the nickname 'bunny candidate' as a result.

Dağlı's candidacy led to concerns as the election drew nearer. Commentators alleged that he was the preferred candidate of AKP leader Recep Tayyip Erdoğan, whom Dağlı claimed had personally asked him to run. Erdoğan had previously stated that he had no knowledge of Kahraman's candidacy until it was officially announced. The 'back-up candidacy' model also raised concerns that dissident MPs within the AKP could vote for Dağlı and publicly demonstrate a split in the party, prompting Dağlı to openly call for MPs to not vote for him.

=== Declared candidates ===
- İsmail Kahraman, incumbent Speaker of the Grand National Assembly and AKP Member of Parliament for İstanbul's first electoral district
- Zekeriya Temizel, CHP Member of Parliament for İzmir's second electoral district
- Celal Adan, MHP Member of Parliament for İstanbul's second electoral district
- Selma Irmak, HDP Member of Parliament for Hakkâri
- Tamer Dağlı, AKP Member of Parliament for Adana
- Yusuf Halaçoğlu, İYİ Party Member of Parliament for Kayseri

== Results ==
Party	Candidate	Party MPs	November 20, 2017		
Party	Candidate	Party MPs	Round 1 367 votes to win	Round 2 367 votes to win	Round 3 276 votes to win
AKP	ismail Kahraman	316	260	257	✓ 289
CHP	Zekeriya Temizel	131	113	122	124
MHP	Celal Adan	36	40	40	36
HDP	Selma Irmak	54	39	38	37
AKP	Tamer Dağlı	316	38	37	Withdrew
İYİ	Yusuf Halaçoğlu	5	6	7	7
Invalid			4	0	16
Blank			0	0	0
Turnout			500	501	509
Result			Inconclusive	Inconclusive	Kahraman elected
Source: Hürriyet

== See also ==
- Deputy Speaker of the Grand National Assembly
