= November 2015 Turkish Parliament Speaker election =

2015 speaker election in the Turkish Parliament

November 2015 Turkish Parliament Speaker elections
← Jun–Jul 2015	November 2015	2017 →

All 550 Members of Parliament voting in the Grand National Assembly 367 votes needed to win in the first two rounds 276 votes needed to win in the third round
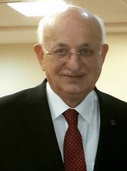

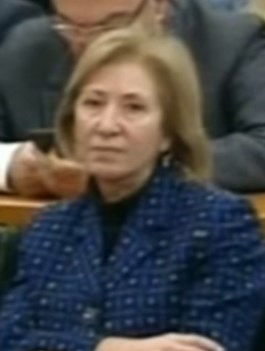

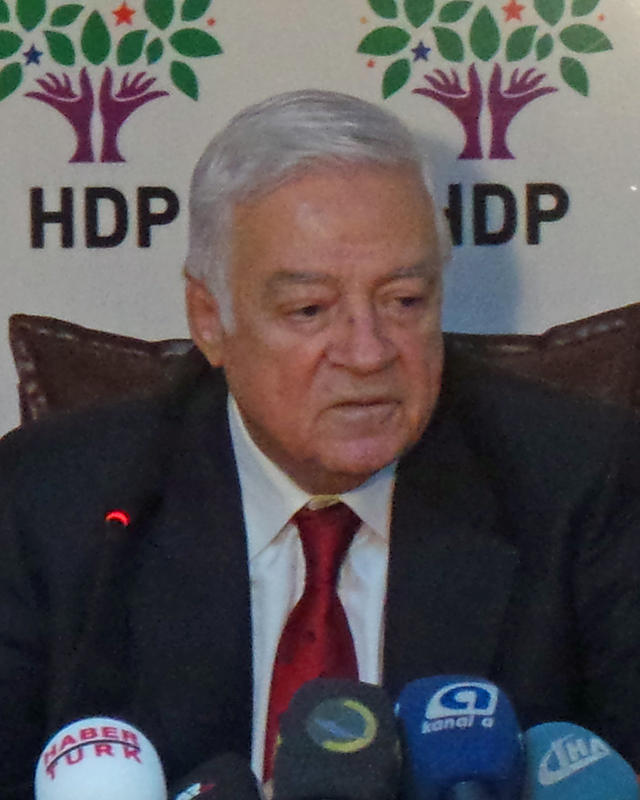

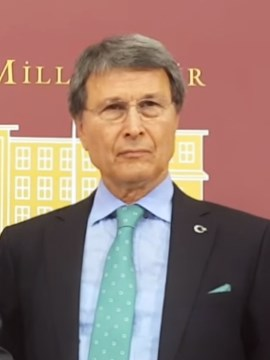
Nominee	İsmail Kahraman	Ayşe Gülsün Bilgehan
Party	AK Party	CHP
Constituency	İstanbul (I)	Ankara (I)
Round 1	316 (60.2%)	127 (24.2%)
Round 2	318 (60.8%)	126 (24.1%)
Round 3	316 (60.5%)	125 (23.9%)
Nominee	Dengir Mir Mehmet Fırat	Yusuf Halaçoğlu
Party	HDP	MHP
Constituency	Mersin	Kayseri
Round 1	41 (7.8%)	41 (7.8%)
Round 2	39 (7.5%)	40 (7.6%)
Round 3	41 (7.9%)	40 (7.7%)
Speaker before election
İsmet Yılmaz
AK Party
Elected Speaker
İsmail Kahraman
AK Party

The Turkish Parliament Speaker elections of November 2015 took place on 22 November 2015 to elect the 27th Speaker of the Grand National Assembly, who will preside over the proceedings of the 26th Parliament of Turkey elected in the 1 November 2015 general election.

== Conduct ==
=== Motion to delay ===
İdris Baluken, a parliamentary group leader of the People's Democratic Party (HDP), raised a motion to delay the speaker election on the grounds that two HDP MPs were on hunger strike in the district of Nusaybin, Mardin Province, which had entered its tenth day of military curfew. Baluken claimed that this would result in the election outcome not being representative of the parliamentary composition. Interim speaker Deniz Baykal however rejected the motion regarding it as irrelevant to the parliamentary agenda.

== Results ==
Party	Candidate	Party MPs	Round 1 367 votes to win	Round 2 367 votes to win	Round 3 276 votes to win
AKP	İsmail Kahraman	317	316	318	✓ 316
CHP	Ayşe Gülsün Bilgehan	134	127	126	125
HDP	Dengir Mir Mehmet Fırat	59	41	40	41
MHP	Yusuf Halaçoğlu	40	41	39	40
Invalid			0	0	2
Blank			0	0	0
Turnout			525	523	524
Result			Inconclusive	Inconclusive	Kahraman elected
Source: RotaHaber

== See also ==
- Deputy Speaker of the Grand National Assembly
