= Turkish Parliament Speaker elections, 2015 =

The Turkish Parliament Speaker elections, 2015 to two different elections, with the first taking place in June and July 2015 and the second taking place in November 2015, to elect the Speakers for the 25th and 26th Parliament of Turkey respectively.

- Turkish Parliament Speaker elections, June–July 2015
- Turkish Parliament Speaker elections, November 2015
