= June–July 2015 Turkish Parliament Speaker election =

June–July 2015 Turkish Parliament Speaker elections
- 30 June and 1 July 2015

All 550 Members of Parliament voting in the Grand National Assembly 367 votes needed to win in the first two rounds 276 votes needed to win in the third round A simple majority of votes needed to win in the final round
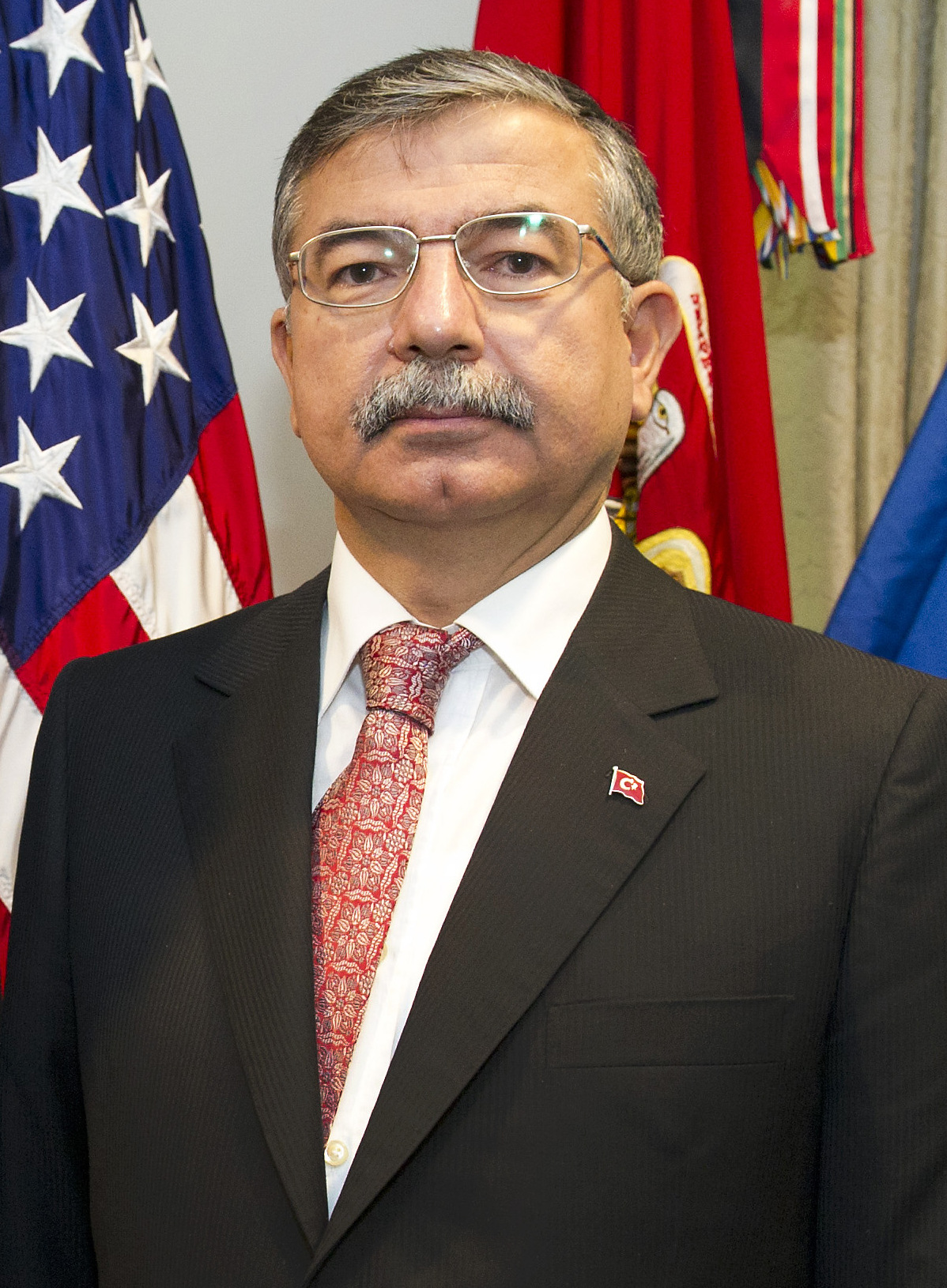

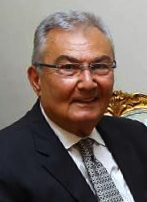

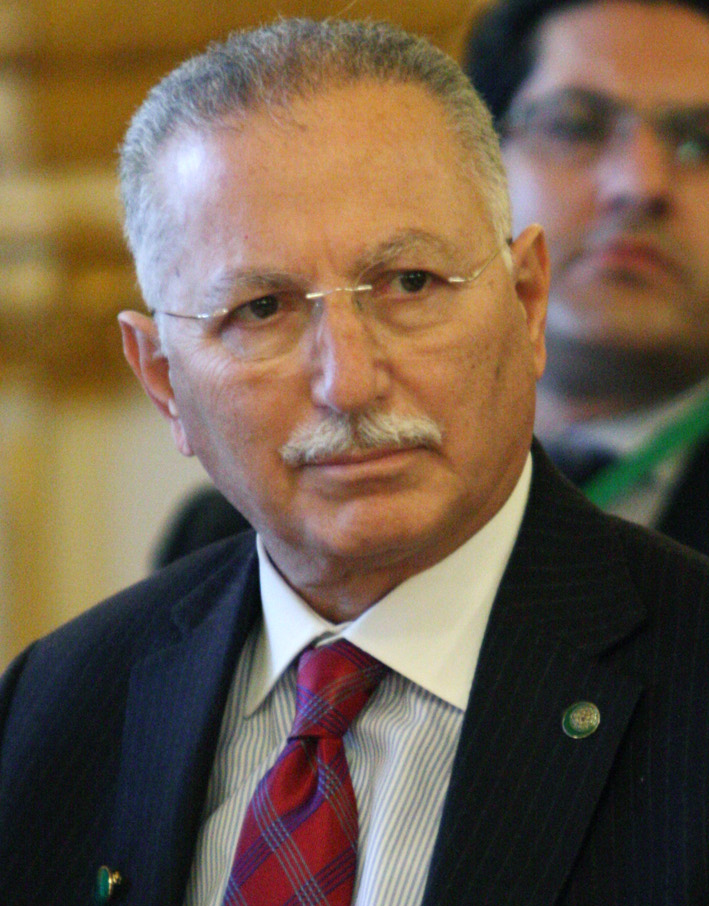

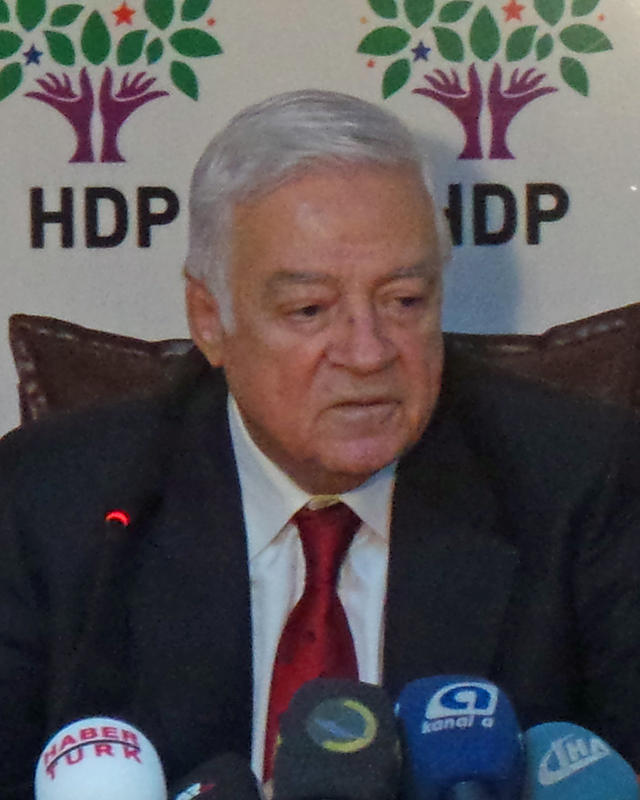
Nominee	İsmet Yılmaz	Deniz Baykal
Party	AK Party	CHP
Constituency	Sivas	Antalya
Round 1	256 (47.1%)	125 (23.0%)
Round 2	256 (47.1%)	128 (23.5%)
Round 3	259 (47.4%)	129 (23.6%)
Round 4	258 (58.6%)	182 (41.4%)
Nominee	Ekmeleddin İhsanoğlu	Dengir Mir Mehmet Fırat
Party	MHP	HDP
Constituency	İstanbul (II)	Mersin
Round 1	81 (14.9%)	81 (14.9%)
Round 2	80 (14.7%)	80 (14.7%)
Round 3	80 (14.7%)	78 (14.3%)
Round 4	✗ Eliminated	✗ Eliminated
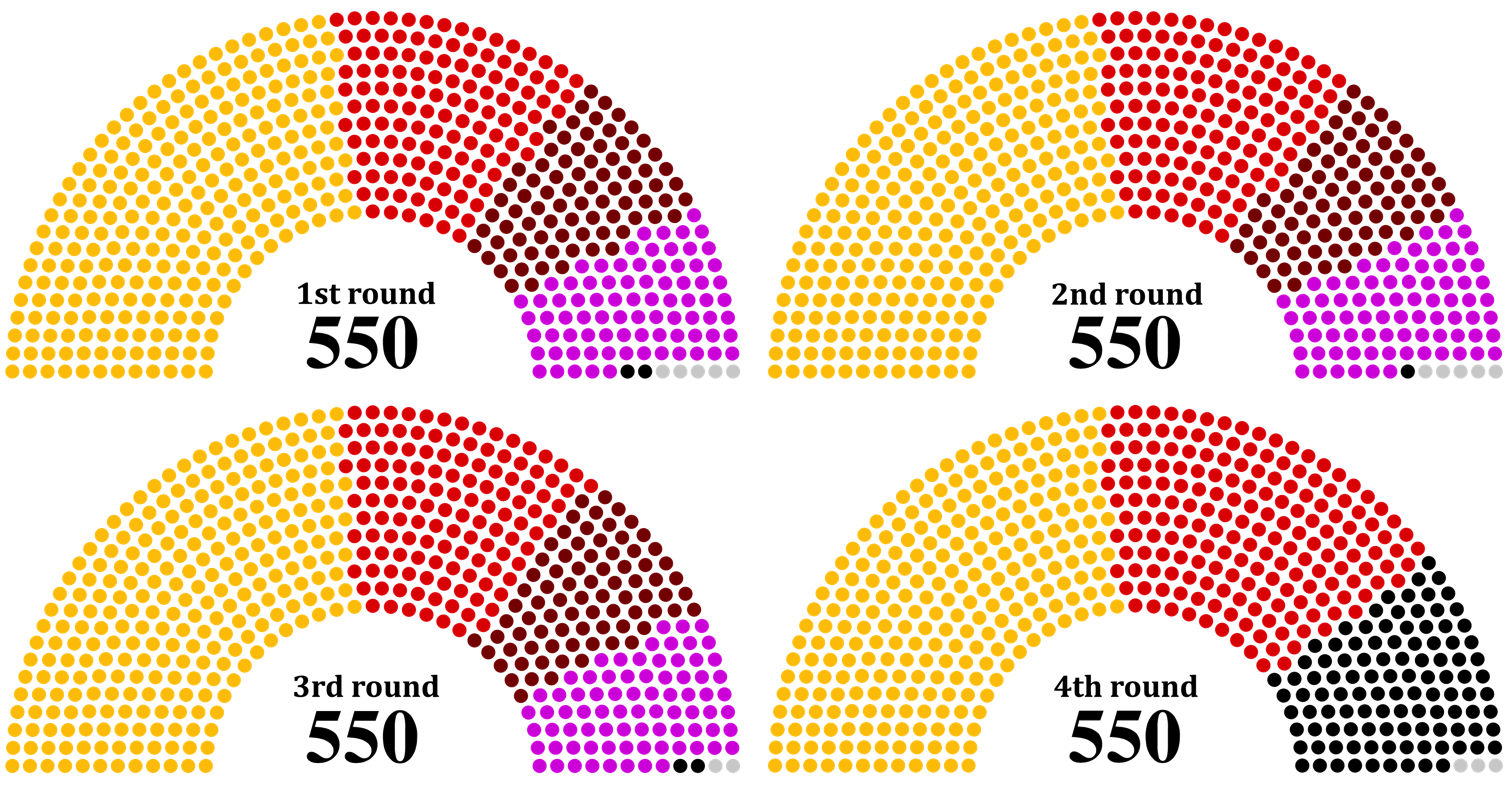
- Votes for each candidate in all four rounds: İsmet Yılmaz Deniz Baykal Ekmeleddin İhsanoğlu; Dengir Mir Mehmet Fırat Invalid/blank Absent
Speaker before election
Cemil Çiçek
AK Party
Elected Speaker
İsmet Yılmaz
AK Party

The June–July 2015 Turkish Parliament Speaker Elections were held on June 30 and July 1 in order to elect the next Speaker of the Grand National Assembly of Turkey. The election took place due to the election of a new parliament in the 7 June 2015 general election. Outgoing speaker of the 24th Parliament, AKP member Cemil Çiçek, was ineligible to stand as he stood down as an MP at the general election.

Since no party has a majority in the new parliament, this was the most unpredictable speaker election in over a decade. Previous speaker elections held under the AKP majority government era (2002-2015) had all been won by the AKP with little contest from opposition parties, due to their unrealistic prospects of winning.

With all parties in parliament supporting their own candidates up to and including the third round, the election went into a fourth and final round where a simple majority was required to win. The Justice and Development Party candidate İsmet Yılmaz was elected speaker with 258 votes, exactly the same as the number of MPs that the AKP has in Parliament. The Republican People's Party candidate Deniz Baykal, who was serving as acting speaker as the oldest MP in the new parliament, received 182 votes. The failure of the opposition parties to unite behind Baykal was attributed to the Nationalist Movement Party's intention of casting invalid or blank votes during the final round, having refused to support Baykal if the Peoples' Democratic Party supported him as well.

== Nomination Process ==
On June 22, Peoples' Democratic Party (HDP) announced that their nominee would be Dengir Mir Mehmet Fırat from Mersin.

On June 24, Republican People's Party (CHP) leader Kemal Kılıçdaroğlu held a MYK meeting and then announced that their nominee would be their former leader and Antalya MP Deniz Baykal, who is currently serving as the interim speaker.

On the same day, Nationalist Movement Party (MHP) announced that their nominee would be Ekmeleddin İhsanoğlu from Istanbul, who was the joint candidate of CHP and MHP for president in 2014.

On June 26, the Justice and Development Party (AKP) announced that they would nominate İsmet Yılmaz, the Minister of National Defence.

== Conduct ==
The first two rounds were to be held on 30 June, while the final two were held on 1 July. The conditions required to win in the rounds were as follows:

- Round 1: a two-thirds majority of 367 votes required to win
- Round 2: a two-thirds majority of 367 votes required to win
- Round 3: a simple majority of 276 votes required to win
- Round 4: a simple majority required to win, with only the top two candidates that received the most votes in the third round contesting.

=== Acting speaker controversy ===
The speaker of the 24th Parliament, Cemil Çiçek, formally handed over his role to Deniz Baykal on 23 June 2015, since Baykal (At age 77) was the oldest member of the new parliament and was thus constitutionally entitled to act as temporary speaker until the new speaker was elected. Baykal was later also nominated as the CHP's candidate for speaker, which was controversial since his role as acting speaker allegedly barred him from campaigning of voting in the election. Amid speculation that Baykal could resign in order to focus on his election campaign, he issued a statement that there was no constitutional regulation that barred him from both continuing as acting speaker and campaigning for election, but would not vote for himself out of convention. He confirmed that he would also be presiding over the electoral proceedings as acting speaker.

The CHP also claimed that İsmet Yılmaz should have resigned from his position as Minister of National Defence during his election campaign.

=== Pre-election speculation ===
Since no party has a majority in the new 25th Parliament, this speaker election was the most unpredictable in decades. In the previous elections held under the AKP majority government era (2002-2015), parties such as the CHP did not usually put forward a candidate due to the certainty of the victory of the AKP's nominee. All four parties represented in parliament put forward a candidate in this election, leading to speculation over tactics and possible alliances during the voting process. There were also hopes that any alliances and cases of tactical voting in the election would possibly point to which parties would form the next coalition government.

Tactical voting attempts were likely to begin in the crucial third round, which determined the two candidates that will contest the fourth and final round. No candidate was expected to win in the first three rounds. There were rumours that up to 60 AKP MPs were planning to vote for the HDP candidate Dengir Mir Mehmet Fırat in order to eliminate the CHP candidate Deniz Baykal, which would mean that the two candidates contesting the fourth round would have been the AKP and HDP candidate. Since the MHP were highly unlikely to vote for Fırat, this would have guaranteed Yılmaz's victory. However, such a situation did not materialise and all parties supported their own candidates in the third round. There was speculation that the opposition (the CHP, MHP and HDP) would all vote for Baykal. However, the MHP stated that they would not vote for Baykal if the HDP supported him. The MHP then announced that they would be casting invalid or blank votes in the final round, thereby effectively guaranteeing Yılmaz's victory. The MHP also called for the CHP to support their own candidate Ekmeleddin İhsanoğlu, who was the CHP-MHP joint presidential candidate for the 2014 presidential election.

== Results ==
Party	Candidate	Party MPs	June 30		July 1	
Party	Candidate	Party MPs	Round 1 367 votes to win	Round 2 367 votes to win	Round 3 276 votes to win	Round 4 majority to win
AKP	İsmet Yılmaz	258	256	256	259	✓ 258
CHP	Deniz Baykal	132	125	128	129	182
MHP	Ekmeleddin İhsanoğlu	80	81	80	80	Eliminated
HDP	Dengir Mir Mehmet Fırat	80	81	80	78	Eliminated
Invalid			0	1	0	78
Blank			2	0	2	29
Turnout			545	545	548	547
Result			Inconclusive	Inconclusive	Inconclusive	Yılmaz elected

=== Aftermath ===
Temporary speaker Deniz Baykal formally handed over his role to İsmet Yılmaz shortly after the final round. HDP co-leader Selahattin Demirtaş criticised the MHP's decision to cast blank votes in the final round, claiming that they had indirectly handed over the role of Speaker to the AKP. He also claimed that the result was an indication of an AKP-MHP coalition.

CHP spokesperson Haluk Koç criticised the MHP, stating that it had become evident who the 'seat supplier' was. This was a reference to MHP leader Devlet Bahçeli's criticism of CHP leader Kemal Kılıçdaroğlu's offer of the post of Prime Minister during coalition negotiations. Koç claimed that the MHP had positioned itself close to the AKP despite heavy criticism of the party during the general election campaign and wished the two parties well in their future relationship.

== See also ==
- June 2015 Turkish general election
- Grand National Assembly of Turkey
- 25th Parliament of Turkey
