= Lale Karabıyık =

Turkish politician (1965–2025)

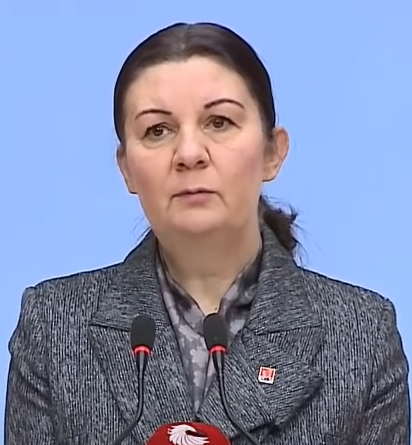
- Karabayık in 2021

Member of the Grand National Assembly
- In office 23 June 2015 – 14 May 2023
- Constituency: Bursa (June 2015); Bursa (November 2015); Bursa (I) (2018)

Personal details
- Born: 22 August 1965 Bilecik, Turkey
- Died: 20 July 2025 (aged 59) Bursa, Turkey
- Party: Republican People's Party
- Spouse: Nezih Karabıyık (m. 1992)
- Children: 1
- Education: Bursa Uludağ University
- Occupation: Politician, academician

Lale Karabıyık (22 August 1965 – 20 July 2025) was a Turkish scholar and politician. She served as a member of the Grand National Assembly of Turkey for the Republican People's Party representing Bursa. She had previously served as a professor of accounting and finance at the Uludağ University.

== Early life and academic career ==
Karabıyık was born in Bilecik in 1965. She graduated from Ertuğrul Gazi High School in 1982 and from the Uludağ University Faculty of Financial and Administrative Sciences in 1986. She completed her master's degree at the Uludağ University Institute of Social Sciences in 1989 and completed her PhD at the same institution in 1993. She became an assistant professor in accounting and finance at Uludağ University in 1994, becoming a docent in 1999 and a professor in 2005. During her academic career, she published 6 books, 29 articles and 2 conference papers and came third in an academic contest organized by the Istanbul Stock Exchange in 1998. She was the Vice-President of the Faculty of Financial and Administrative Sciences between 2000 and 2003 and was the Head of the Department of Business in the academic year 2003-04.

== Political career ==
In the 2011 general election, Karabıyık was nominated for the 6th place in Bursa by the Republican People's Party (CHP) but missed being elected by a small margin of votes. Karabıyık resigned her duties at the Uludağ University in February 2015 to announce her bid to become a candidate for the CHP in the June 2015 general election. She was at the 1st place in Bursa and was elected to the 25th Parliament of Turkey. She was nominated at the first place in the November 2015 general election as well and re-elected to the 26th Parliament of Turkey. In January 2016, she was appointed to the Central Board of the CHP as the member responsible for social policies.

== Personal life and death ==
Karabıyık lived in Bursa from 1982. She was married to Nezih Karabıyık, a mechanical engineer, and had one child. She was fluent in English. Karabıyık died of soft-tissue sarcoma in Bursa, on 20 July 2025, at the age of 59.
