= Dengir Mir Mehmet Fırat =

Turkish politician (1943–2019)

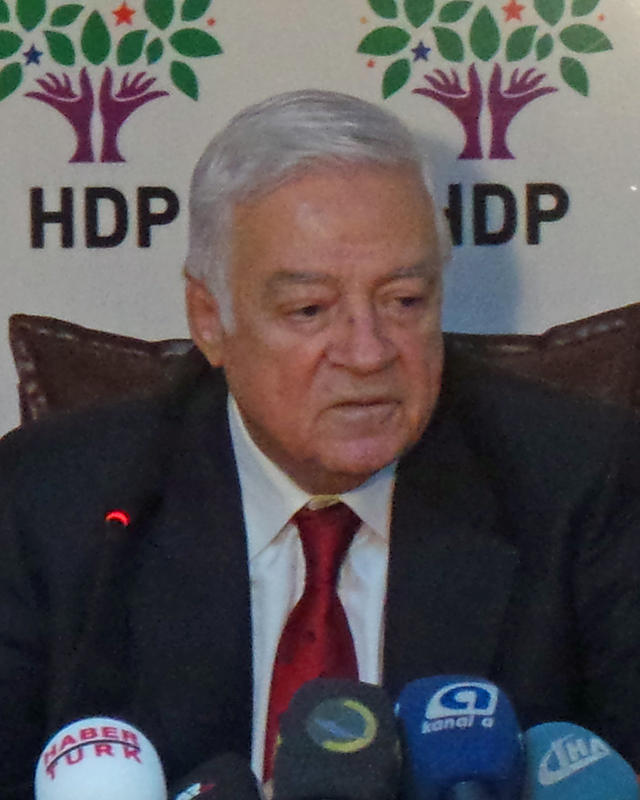

Member of the Grand National Assembly
- In office 7 June 2015 – 7 July 2018
- Constituency: Mersin (June 2015, Nov 2015)
- In office 18 April 1999 – 12 June 2011
- Constituency: Adıyaman (1999); Mersin (2002); Adana (2007)

Deputy leader of the Justice and Development Party
- In office 10 August 2001 – 7 November 2008
- Leader: Recep Tayyip Erdoğan
- Preceded by: Position established
- Succeeded by: Abdulkadir Aksu

Personal details
- Born: 8 August 1943 Kahta, Adıyaman, Turkey
- Died: 11 July 2019 (aged 75)
- Party: Virtue Party (FP) 1999-2001; Justice and Development Party (AKP) 2001-2014; Peoples' Democratic Party (HDP) 2015-2019
- Education: Ankara University, Law School
- Occupation: Politician
- Profession: Lawyer

Dengir Mir Mehmet Fırat (8 August 1943 – 11 July 2019) was a Turkish politician of Kurdish origin who was one of the founders of the Justice and Development Party (AKP) in 2001. He served as a Member of Parliament for the Grand National Assembly from 1999 to 2011 and again from 2015 to 2018 as a member of the Peoples' Democratic Party (HDP).

== Early life ==
Fırat was born in the district of Kahta in Adyaman on 8 August 1943. His grandfather, Hacı Bedir Fırat, was an MP during the first, second and third Parliaments of the Turkish Republic, serving from Malatya for the first and second and from Kars for the third Parliament. His uncle Hüseyin Fehmi Fırat was a Democratic Party politician who also served as an MP for three terms. His cousin, Mehmet Sırrı Turanlı, was an MP for Adıyaman in the 11th Parliament and was later also a senator.

In Kurdish, the name 'Dengir' means "great voice" while the name 'Mîr' means bey (local leader). Mir Mehmet was the name of one of Fırat's forefathers. From a Kurdish background, Fırat's grandfather was given a medal by Mustafa Kemal Atatürk.

After graduation, Fırat served as a freelance lawyer, a farmer and an export tradesman. He was a member of the Executive Board of the Mediterranean Exporters Association.

== Political career ==
=== Felicity Party, 1999-2001 ===
Fırat was elected as a Member of Parliament for Adyaman from the Islamist orientated Virtue Party (FP) in the 1999 general election. The party saw a split between traditionalist Islamists and moderate conservatives over the course of the Parliament, with a party leadership election contested by the most modern Abdullah Gül and traditionalist incumbent Recai Kutan yielding a victory for Kutan. In the 2000 presidential election, Fırat put his name forward as a candidate, but withdrew and was defeated by cross-party candidate Ahmet Necdet Sezer. The party was closed down in 2001 by the Constitutional Court for violating state secularism, after which traditionalist MPs formed the Felicity Party (SP) while moderate conservatives formed the Justice and Development Party (AKP). Fırat was one of the founding members of the AKP and joined the party after the FP's dissolution.

=== Justice and Development Party, 2001-14 ===
As one of the founders of the AKP, Fırat served as a Deputy leader of the party under Recep Tayyip Erdoğan. He was elected in the 2002 general election as a Member of Parliament for Mersin and re-elected in the 2007 general election as a Member of Parliament for Adana. He did not contest the 2011 general election. Despite the AKP forming a majority government in both 2002 and 2007, Fırat was not made a Minister despite being one of the AKP's founders. In an interview given to The New York Times in 2008, Fırat caused controversy after criticising Atatürk for his secular revolutions for causing a "trauma" within society.

Serving as the party's deputy leader, Fırat resigned from this role in November 2008 after accusations of corruption during a live debate with Kemal Kılıçdaroğlu, the parliamentary group leader of the Republican People's Party. He resigned from the AKP completely on 27 July 2014, positing his decision on Facebook.

=== Peoples' Democratic Party, 2015-2019 ===
Fırat defected from the AKP to the HDP in February 2015, with the intention of running for Parliament from Mersin as a HDP candidate. He claimed that the HDP could become the main opposition party in future elections. His defection was one of the high-profile defections that the AKP had suffered to the HDP, which was perceived to be taking large portions of the AKP vote in the Kurdish south-east of Turkey. He was elected to Parliament in the June 2015 general election after his party succeeded in surpassing the 10% election threshold needed to gain seats in Parliament. He was subsequently put forward by the HDP as their candidate for Parliamentary Speaker in the June–July 2015 speaker elections, but was eliminated in the third round. He died on 11 July 2019, aged 75, from lung cancer.

== See also ==
- Selahattin Demirtaş
- Figen Yüksekdağ
