= Bursa (electoral district) =

Electoral district for the Grand National Assembly of Turkey

Coordinates: 37°50′N 34°45′E

- electoral district for the Grand National Assembly of Turkey
- Bursa shown within Turkey
- Province: Bursa
- Electorate: 1,876,748

Current electoral district
- Created: 1920
- Seats: 18 Historical: 16 (1999–2007)
- Turnout at last election: 89.46%
- Representation
- AK Party: 11 / 18
- CHP: 5 / 18
- MHP: 2 / 18

Bursa is an electoral district of the Grand National Assembly of Turkey. It elects eighteen members of parliament (deputies) to represent the province of the same name for a four-year term by the D'Hondt method, a party-list proportional representation system. It was the most populous district won by Erdoğan in the 2023 Turkish general election

== Members ==
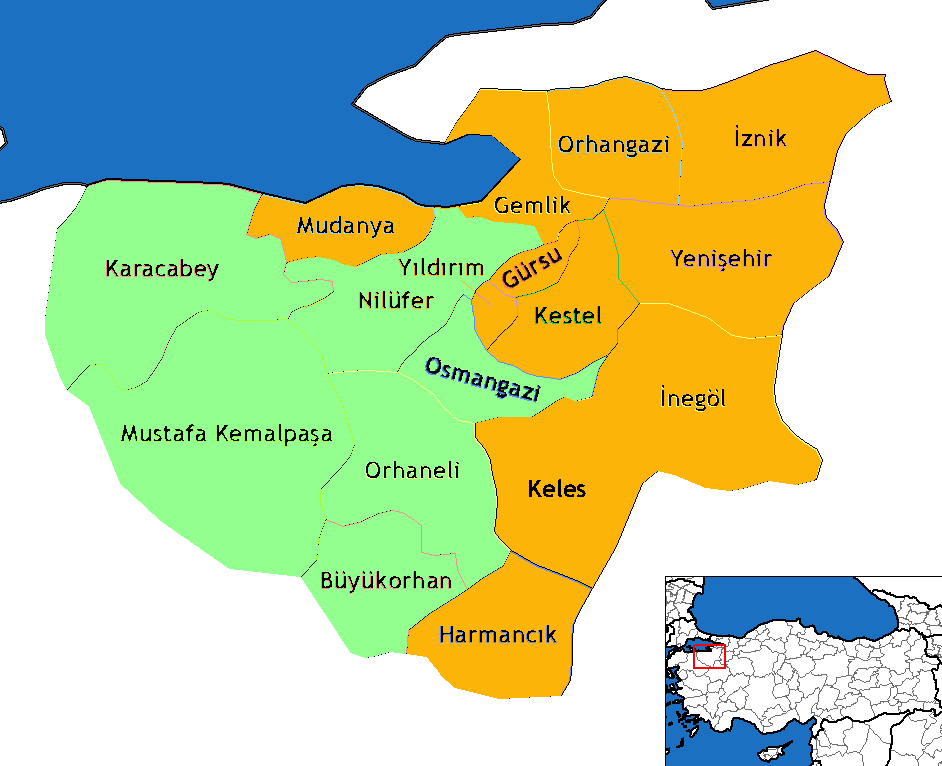
The two electoral districts of Bursa First electoral district (10 MPs) Second electoral district (10 MPs)

Population reviews of each electoral district are conducted before each general election, which can lead to certain districts being granted a smaller or greater number of parliamentary seats.

MPs for Bursa, 2002 onwards
Election	2002 (22nd Parliament)	2007 (23rd Parliament)	2011 (24th Parliament)	June 2015 (25th Parliament)	November 2015 (26th Parliament)
MP	Abdulmecit Alp; AK Party	Hayrettin Çakmak; AK Party	Bedrettin Yıldırım; AK Party	Mehmet Müezzinoğlu; AK Party	
MP	Faruk Anbarcıoğlu; AK Party	Canan Candemir Çelik; AK Party		Emine Yavuz Gözgeç; AK Party	
MP	Mehmet Altan Karapaşaoğlu; AK Party		Bülent Arınç; AK Party	Cemalettin Kani Torun; AK Party	
MP	Faruk Çelik; AK Party		Hakan Çavuşoğlu; AK Party		
MP	Mustafa Dündar; AK Party	Ali Koyuncu; AK Party	Hüseyin Şahin; AK Party		
MP	Şerif Birinç; AK Party	Ali Kul; AK Party	İsmail Aydın; AK Party	Zekeriya Birkan; AK Party	
MP	Zafer Hıdıroğlu; AK Party	Mehmet Ocaktan; AK Party	İsmet Su; AK Party		Efkan Ala; AK Party
MP	Sedat Kızılcıklı; AK Party		Mustafa Kemal Şerbetçioğlu; AK Party	Bennur Karaburun; AK Party	İsmail Aydın; AK Party
MP	Şevket Orhan; AK Party	Mehmet Tunçak; AK Party	Önder Matlı; AK Party		Hüseyin Şahin; AK Party
MP	Mehmet Emin Tutan; AK Party		Mustafa Öztürk; AK Party	Asiye Kolçak; HDP	Osman Mesten; AK Party
MP	Niyazi Pakyürek; AK Party	Hamza Hamit Homriş; MHP	Tülin Erkal Kara; AK Party	Tevfik Topçu; MHP	Muhammet Müfit Aydın; AK Party
MP	Ertüğrül Yalçınbayır; AK Party	Necati Özansoy; MHP		Kadir Koçdemir; MHP	
MP	Mehmet Küçükaşık; CHP	İsmet Büyükataman; MHP			
MP	Ali Dinçer; CHP	Abdullah Özer; CHP	Aykan Erdemir; CHP	Lale Karabıyık; CHP	
MP	Kemal Demirel; CHP		Sena Kaleli; CHP	Ceyhun İrgil; CHP	
MP	Mustafa Özyurt; CHP	Onur Başaran Öymen; CHP	Turban Tayan; CHP	Orhan Sarıbal; CHP	
MP	No seat		İlhan Demiröz; CHP	Erkan Aydın; CHP	
MP	No seat		Kemal Ekinci; CHP	Nurhayat Altaca Kayışoğlu; CHP	

== General elections ==
=== 2011 ===
2011 general election: Bursa
Party	Candidate	Votes	%	±%
AK Party	11 elected ▲1: 1. Bülent Arınç ✓; 2. Mustafa Öztürk ✓; 3. Hüseyin Şahin ✓; 4. Canan Candemir Çelik ✓; 5. İsmet Su ✓; 6. Mustafa Kemal Şerbetçioğlu ✓; 7. Hakan Çavuşoğlu ✓; 8. İsmail Aydın ✓; 9. Tülin Erkal Kara ✓; 10. Bedrettin Yıldırım ✓; 11. Önder Matlı ✓; 12. Cafer Yıldız ✗; 13. Cemile Yiğit ✗; 14. Sadettin Cangül ✗; 15. Ali Ömeroğlu ✗; 16. Fahrettin Keskin ✗; 17. Ayşe Hacıoğlu ✗; 18. Mahmut Turunç ✗	875,380	52.97	▲2.21
CHP	5 elected ▲2: 1. Sena Kaleli ✓; 2. Turhan Tayan ✓; 3. İlhan Demiröz ✓; 4. Aykan Erdemir ✓; 5. Kemal Ekinci ✓; 6. Lale Karabıyık ✗; 7. Ali Semih Özsaraç ✗; 8. Salih Top ✗; 9. Yaşar Karagöz ✗; 10. Ulun Havva Kayı ✗; 11. Fatma Altay ✗; 12. Ahmet Aydın Akyol ✗; 13. Oğuz Altınok ✗; 14. Sevil Pamirol ✗; 15. Orhan Karabaş ✗; 16. Nurhayat Altaca ✗; 17. İnan Keser ✗; 18. Nuray Çohan ✗	412,887	24.98	▲6.57
MHP	2 elected ▼1: 1. İsmet Büyükataman ✓; 2. Necati Özensoy ✓; 3. Cüneyt Karlık ✗; 4. Fevzi Zırhlıoğlu ✗; 5. Hasan Toktaş ✗; 6. Arif Demirören ✗; 7. Mehmet Ali Adak ✗; 8. Gülten Sürücü ✗; 9. Levent Burmalı ✗; 10. Yavuz Koca ✗; 11. İbrahim Yetim ✗; 12. Zafer Milli ✗; 13. Engin Er ✗; 14. Şenay Uslu Doğan ✗; 15. Levent Çelik ✗; 16. Yalçın Gürel ✗; 17. Orhan Babacan ✗; 18. Murtaza Kılıç ✗	238,137	14.41	▼0.07
SAADET	None elected: 1. Şevket Kazan ✗; 2. Gökhan Gerçek ✗; 3. Salih Berber ✗; 4. Recep Aygün ✗; 5. Handan Demirtaş ✗; 6. Burak Çelik ✗; 7. Nebi Yurtsever ✗; 8. İbrahim Akbıyık ✗; 9. Mevlüde Kurtuluş ✗; 10. Ertan Sütçü ✗; 11. Kadriye Sayın ✗; 12. Necmettin Çamlıdere ✗; 13. Erdoğan Aydın ✗; 14. Neşe Yıldırım ✗; 15. Erhan Şeşen ✗; 16. Ebru Yeter ✗; 17. Ramazan Tekin ✗; 18. Serkan Demir ✗	32,619	1.97	▼1.96
Independent	None elected: Burcu Üzümcüler ✗ Mehmet Alanbel ✗ Mehmet Deniz Büyük ✗ Semi Kopuz ✗	27,284	1.65	▲0.58
HAS Party	None elected: 1. Ahmet Sünnetçioğlu ✗; 2. Ramazan Albay ✗; 3. Hayrunnisa Kökbıyık ✗; 4. Mehmet Karakoyun ✗; 5. İbadet Deniz ✗; 6. Fahrettin Uludağ ✗; 7. Mustafa Süngü ✗; 8. Soner Aksoy ✗; 9. Hasan Uçar ✗; 10. Fikret Serkan ✗; 11. Adnan Türkyılmaz ✗; 12. Suat Boz ✗; 13. Şaban Çelek ✗; 14. Muhammet Kocaman ✗; 15. Samet Doğan ✗; 16. Ali Yıldırım ✗; 17. Fatma Koca ✗; 18. Şaban Yıldırım ✗	15,145	0.92	▲0.92
DP	None elected: 1. Haydar Baş ✗; 2. Füsun Yaşar ✗; 3. Yusuf Öz ✗; 4. Ali Garaçoğlu ✗; 5. İbrahim Pekbay ✗; 6. Bilal Karamus ✗; 7. Azmi Kaya ✗; 8. Asuman Sevda Halaçlar ✗; 9. Gürcan Özsöz ✗; 10. Arslan Arslan ✗; 11. Ercan Ateş ✗; 12. Rüstem Önder ✗; 13. Yunus Demiray ✗; 14. Aysun Durak ✗; 15. Hidayet Sevinç ✗; 16. Nazlı Sargın ✗; 17. Metin Cerev ✗; 18. Nebahat Karadeniz ✗	14,545	0.88	▼4.74
HEPAR	None elected: 1. Ergün Taşdemir ✗; 2. Tayyar Çelik ✗; 3. Ömürlü Cebe ✗; 4. Erkan Karamehmetoğlu ✗; 5. Selda Yılmaz ✗; 6. Nesrin Yıldızeli ✗; 7. Ali Bayrak ✗; 8. Gönül Turan ✗; 9. Sibel Torun ✗; 10. Hakan Tanrıkut ✗; 11. Belgin Acemoğlu ✗; 12. İlker Yasin Torun ✗; 13. İbrahim İçin ✗; 14. Uğurgül Karamehmetoğlu ✗; 15. Aylin Çelik ✗; 16. Cengiz Şen ✗; 17. İsmail Yavaş ✗; 18. Sezgin Çalışkan ✗	10,867	0.66	▲0.66
Büyük Birlik	None elected: 1.Ekrem Alfatlı ✗ 2.Salih Uçak ✗ 3.Ülkü Sonki Armutçu ✗ 4.Yakup Ayışık ✗ 5.Mualla Kaymak ✗ 6.Ömer Ünsal ✗ 7.Ayşenur Sevim ✗ 8.Müzeyyen Toprak ✗ 9.Ramazan Çakır ✗ 10.Orhan Özden ✗ 11.Zekiye Bilen ✗ 12.Selahattin Bayram ✗ 13.Fırat Gümüş ✗ 14.Adil Özek ✗ 15.İsmail Aslan ✗ 16.İlknur Çimen ✗ 17.Mehmet Selçuk Erginay ✗ 18.Mehmet Gebeş ✗	9,597	0.58	▲0.58
DSP	None elected: 1. Hüseyin Kul ✗; 2. Ahmet Murat Özbilge ✗; 3. Kadir Evren ✗; 4. Hilmi Küçük ✗; 5. Türkan Demirörs ✗; 6. Nesrin Kalelioğlu ✗; 7. Metin Güneş ✗; 8. Fatih Dündar Gürel ✗; 9. Ziya Doğanay ✗ 10.Nuran Karabulut ✗ 11.İlhan Soysal ✗ 12.Türkan Kayacıkbaşı ✗ 13.Çağdaş Yıldız ✗ 14.Murat Sağduyu ✗ 15.Selçuk Orkan Süğlünoğlu ✗ 16.Mustafa Saraç ✗ 17.Cevat Erkul ✗ 18.Mesut Sevimli ✗	4,888	0.30	N/A
DYP	None elected: 1. İbrahim Erol ✗; 2. Nazim Bektaş ✗; 3. Evren Uzgören ✗; 4. Burak Şunda ✗; 5. Adem Çelik ✗; 6. Yusuf Baştürk ✗; 7. Erhan Sönmez ✗; 8. Osman Filiz ✗; 9. Ahmet Üstün ✗ 10.Yılmaz Yorgun ✗ 11.Süleyman Desovalı ✗ 12.Necati Ayaş ✗ 13.Saliha Akdemir ✗ 14.Kıymet Kaya ✗ 15.Sevinç Akbunar ✗ 16.Kadriye Erol ✗ 17.Ahmet Günaydın ✗ 18.Gürkan Mustafa Sedef ✗	3,692	0.22	▲0.22
MP	None elected: 1. Abdurrahman Önder ✗; 2. Mahmut Çil ✗; 3. Hüsamettin Akyıldız ✗; 4. Mehmet Kısa ✗; 5. Tevfik Teoman ✗; 6. Mehmet Ekiz ✗; 7. Ahmet Avcı ✗; 8. Mahmut Berkan Karakoç ✗; 9. Ayşe Demir ✗; 10. Faruk Tunalı ✗; 11. Nazmi Amiz ✗; 12. Münüre Cesur ✗; 13. Temel Kaya ✗; 14. Türkcan Sarıkaya ✗; 15. İbrahim Üstün ✗; 16. Kadir Kurt ✗; 17. Nilgül Baş ✗; 18. Ahmet Arık ✗	3,271	0.20	▲0.20
TKP	None elected: 1. Salih Çam ✗; 2. Mehmet Yavuzkan ✗; 3. Eylem Yentürk ✗; 4. Ulvi Yavuz ✗; 5. Esen Ensari ✗; 6. Önder Dirik ✗; 7. Barış Erakkuş ✗; 8. Zafer Kırdar ✗; 9. Gonca Turgutoğlu Demir ✗ 10.Harun Yıldırım ✗ 11.Hüseyin Kargı ✗ 12.Sinem Yıldırım ✗ 13.Nevriye Çimenli ✗ 14.Murat Başaran ✗ 15.Murat İnan ✗ 16.Türker Civelek ✗ 17.Umhan Deniz ✗ 18.Günce Güneytepe ✗	1,861	0.11	▼0.07
Nationalist Conservative	None elected: 1. Bilal Delibaş ✗; 2. İbrahim Çırak ✗; 3. Erol Odabaş ✗; 4. İlyas Öztürk ✗; 5. Nazmi Eğilmez ✗; 6. Yücel Aktaş ✗; 7. Osman Çırak ✗; 8. Zafer Yılmaz ✗; 9. İsmail Onar ✗ 10.Meryem Şahin ✗ 11.Saadet Tuncay ✗ 12.Ayhan Arslan ✗ 13.Metin Yalçın ✗ 14.Mikail Özaydın ✗ 15.Güngör Bayram ✗ 16.Burcu Gümüş ✗ 17.Mustafa Özturna ✗ 18.Leman Karabacak ✗	1,674	0.10	▲0.10
Liberal Democrat	None elected: 1. Mehmet Nizam Kağıtçıbaşı ✗; 2. Orhan Kılıç ✗; 3. Zafer Nas ✗; 4. Filiz Nas ✗; 5. Oktay Buzcu ✗; 6. Remziye Demiroğlu ✗; 7. Neslihan Koçak ✗; 8. Mesut Albayrak ✗; 9. Gülsün Sözmen ✗; 10. Erkan Gelenoğlu ✗; 11. Hasan Öztürk ✗; 12. Hasan Öztorun ✗; 13. Mehmet Sinan Tuğrul ✗; 14. Emine Küçükelliiki ✗; 15. Hakkı Kanbo ✗; 16. Mehmet Alkan ✗; 17. İsmail Güner ✗; 18. Serkan Lafcıoğlu ✗	781	0.05	▼0.15
Labour	No candidates	0	0.00	0.00
Total votes		1,652,628	100.00	
Rejected ballots		31,505	1.88	▼0.46
Turnout		1,678,968	89.46	▲0.70
AK Party hold Majority		462,493	27.99	▼4.35

=== June 2015 ===
Abbr.	Party	Votes	%
AK Party	Justice and Development Party	767,541	43.9%
CHP	Republican People's Party	489,254	28%
MHP	Nationalist Movement Party	309,376	17.7%
HDP	Peoples' Democratic Party	96,513	5.5%
SP	Felicity Party	56,156	3.2%
	Other	31,324	1.8%
Total		1,750,164	
Turnout		87.90	
source: YSK

=== November 2015 ===
Abbr.	Party	Votes	%
AK Party	Justice and Development Party	975,760	54%
CHP	Republican People's Party	482,124	26.7%
MHP	Nationalist Movement Party	223,866	12.4%
HDP	Peoples' Democratic Party	74,600	4.1%
SP	Felicity Party	18,646	1%
	Other	33,116	1.8%
Total		1,808,112	
Turnout		89.46	
source: YSK

=== 2018 ===
Abbr.	Party	Votes	%
AK Party	Justice and Development Party	855,754	45.2%
CHP	Republican People's Party	429,715	22.7%
IYI	Good Party	238,816	12.6%
MHP	Nationalist Movement Party	201,111	10.6%
HDP	Peoples' Democratic Party	100,881	5.3%
SP	Felicity Party	32,796	1.7%
	Other	34,322	1.8%
Total		1,893,395	
Turnout		88.16	
source: YSK

== Presidential elections ==
=== 2014 ===
2014 presidential election: Bursa
Party	Candidate	Votes	%
AK Party	Recep Tayyip Erdoğan	848,694	54.88
Independent	Ekmeleddin İhsanoğlu	633,485	40.96
HDP	Selahattin Demirtaş	64,294	4.16
Total votes		1,546,473	100.00
Rejected ballots		30,544	1.94
Turnout		1,577,017	79.31
Recep Tayyip Erdoğan win			
