= Tokat (electoral district) =

Electoral district for the Grand National Assembly of Turkey

Coordinates: 40°25′N 36°35′E

- electoral district for the Grand National Assembly of Turkey
- Tokat shown within Turkey
- Province: Tokat
- Electorate: 417,086

Current electoral district
- Created: 1920
- Seats: 5 Historical: 7 (2002-2011) 6 (1999-2002) 7 (1995-1999) 6 (1983-1995) 7 (1961-1983) 10 (1957-1961) 9 (1954-1957)
- MPs: List: Zeyid Aslan AKP Şükrü Ayalan AKP Dilek Yüksel AKP Orhan Düzgün CHP Reşat Doğru MHP
- Turnout at last election: 88.42%
- Representation
- AK Party: 3 / 5
- MHP: 1 / 5
- CHP: 1 / 5

Tokat is an electoral district of the Grand National Assembly of Turkey. It elects 5 members of parliament (deputies) to represent the province of the same name for a four-year term by the D'Hondt method, a party-list proportional representation system.

== Members ==
Population reviews of each electoral district are conducted before each general election, which can lead to certain districts being granted a smaller or greater number of parliamentary seats. The number of seats allocated to Tokat fluctuated between six and seven seats in the last twenty years. It has now dropped to five seats, its lowest level yet.

MPs for Tokat, 1999 onwards
Seat	1999 (21st parliament)	2002 (22nd parliament)	2007 (23rd parliament)	2011 (24th parliament)	June 2015 (25th parliament)
MP	Mehmet Ergün Dağçıoğlu; Virtue	Zeyid Aslan; AK Party			Coşkun Çakır; AK Party
MP	Bekir Sobacı; Virtue	Şükrü Ayalan; AK Party			Celil Göçer; AK Party
MP	Lütfi Ceylan; MHP	İbrahim Çamak; AK Party	Dilek Yüksel; AK Party		Fatma Gaye Güler; AK Party
MP	Hasan Hüseyin Balak; MHP	Orhan Ziya Diren; CHP		Orhan Düzgün; CHP	
MP	Reşat Doğru; MHP	Feramüz Şahin; CHP	Reşat Doğru; MHP		Abdurrahman Başkan; MHP
MP	Ali Şevki Erek; DYP	Mehmet Ergün Dağçıoğlu; AK Party	Osman Demir; AK Party	Seat abolished	
MP	No seat	Resul Tosun; AK Party	Hüseyin Gülsün; AK Party	Seat abolished	

== General elections ==
=== 2011 ===
2011 Turkish general election: Tokat
List	Candidates	Votes	Of total (%)	± from prev.
AK Party	Zeyid Aslan,Şükrü Ayalan,Dilek Yüksel	202,481	55.90	
CHP	Orhan Düzgün	85,149	23.51	
MHP	Reşat Doğru	57,257	15.81	
SAADET	None elected	6267	1.73	
Büyük Birlik	None elected	3591	0.99	
HAS Party	None elected	2643	0.73	N/A
DP	None elected	2107	0.58	
DYP	None elected	719	0.20	
Labour	None elected	564	0.16	
MP	None elected	366	0.1	
DSP	None elected	358	0.1	'"`UNIQ−−ref−0000000D−QINU`"'
TKP	None elected	281	0.08	
Nationalist Conservative	None elected	264	0.07	
Independents	None elected	173	0.05	
HEPAR	None elected	0		
Liberal Democrat	None elected	418	0.11	
Turnout		362,220	88.04	

== Presidential elections ==
=== 2014 ===
Presidential Election 2014: Tokat
Party	Candidate	Votes	%
AK Party	Recep Tayyip Erdoğan	206,899	62.29
Independent	Ekmeleddin İhsanoğlu	121,248	36.50
HDP	Selahattin Demirtaş	4,018	1.21
Total votes		332,165	100.00
Rejected ballots		6,541	1.93
Turnout		338,706	81.14
Recep Tayyip Erdoğan win			
