= Tamer Dağlı =

Turkish politician (born 1970)

Tamer Dağlı MP

Member of the Grand National Assembly
- In office 17 November 2015 – 14 May 2023
- Constituency: Adana (Nov 2015, 2018)

Personal details
- Born: June 5, 1970 (age 56) Kozan, Adana, Turkey
- Party: Justice and Development Party
- Education: Ankara University
- Occupation: Politician

Tamer Dağlı (born 5 June 1970) is a Turkish politician from the Justice and Development Party (AK Party), who has served as a Member of Parliament for Adana since 1 November 2015, 2018.

== Biography ==
Tamer Dağlı was born in Kozan, Adana Province, on 5 June 1970 to Hasan and his wife Gülcan. He completed his primary, secondary, and high school education in Adana. Dağlı graduated from Ankara University Faculty of Political Sciences in 1990. He was elected as an AK Party Member of Parliament for Adana in the November 2015 general election.

Dağlı is married, and has three children.
