= Yusuf Halaçoğlu =

Turkish historian and politician

Prof. Dr. Yusuf Halaçoğlu
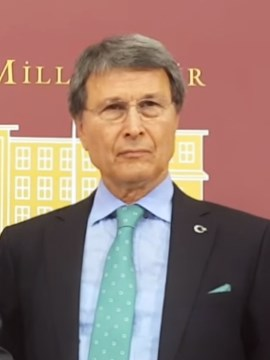

Leader of the Blessed Party
- Incumbent
- Assumed office 28 June 2024
- Preceded by: Position established

Member of the Grand National Assembly
- In office 12 June 2011 – 7 July 2018
- Constituency: Kayseri (2011, June 2015, Nov 2015)

Chairman of the Turkish Historical Society
- In office 27 September 1993 – 23 July 2008
- Prime Minister: Tansu Çiller; Mesut Yılmaz; Necmettin Erbakan; Bülent Ecevit; Abdullah Gül; Recep Tayyip Erdoğan
- Preceded by: İbrahim Agâh Çubukçu
- Succeeded by: Ali Birinci

Personal details
- Born: 10 May 1949 (age 77) Kozan, Adana Province, Turkey
- Party: Nationalist Movement Party (2011-2017); Good Party (2017-2018); Independent (2018-2024); Blessed Party (2024-present)
- Education: Istanbul University
- Occupation: Academic, politician and author
- Profession: Historian

Yusuf Halaçoğlu (born 10 May 1949, in Kozan, Adana) is a Turkish professor of history and a politician. He is a former president of the Turkish Historical Society and was a member of the Turkish Parliament from 2011 to 2017 representing the electoral district of Kayseri for the Nationalist Movement Party (MHP) and from 2017 for the Good Party. As of 2024 he is the Leader of the Blessed Party (Kutlu Parti).

He studied history at Istanbul University and pursued an academic career at the same university after graduating in 1974. In 1983, he became an assistant professor. Halaçoğlu entered Marmara University in 1986, and in 1989 he was appointed a professor. After serving in leading positions at the Turkish State Archives, he returned to the university in 1992. From 1993 on, he served as the chairman of the Turkish Historical Society until his dismissal in 2008. He then returned to his chair at Gazi University.

In the 2011 general election, Halaçoğlu was elected into parliament, and was reelected in June and November 2015. In November 2015, the MHP nominated him for Parliamentary Speaker, where he finished on fourth place. In 2017 he left the MHP to be a founding member of a new party, the Good Party. He was deselected as a candidate for the 2018 Election After the 2018 elections, he resigned from the Good Party.

== Views ==
Halaçoğlu is a well-known researcher on the Armenian question and has authored several works that mitigate the suffering the Armenians underwent during World War I. He preferred the term 'Tehcir' (forced relocation) to deportation, as the displacement had taken place within the Ottoman Empire. He places the number of deaths during the displacements at 300,000 (combining figures from both Anatolia & Caucuses), as opposed to the 600,000 to 1,500,000. He compared it to the relocations the USA undertook with its Japanese citizens during World War II.

In the year 2004 he was prosecuted in Winterthur, Switzerland after he denied the Armenian genocide in a speech he held at the Turkish Association in Winterthur.
