= Zekeriya Temizel =

Turkish politician (born 1948)

Minister of Treasury and Finance of Turkey
- In office 30 June 1997 – 23 February 1999
- Prime Minister: Bülent Ecevit
- Preceded by: Abdüllatif Şener
- Succeeded by: İbrahim Nami Çağan

Chairman of the Banking Regulation and Supervision Agency
- In office 31 March 2000 – 3 March 2001
- Preceded by: New office
- Succeeded by: Engin Akçakoca

Member of the Grand National Assembly
- In office 3 June 2015 – 16 May 2018
- Constituency: İzmir (June 2015, November 2015)

Member of the Grand National Assembly
- In office 8 January 1996 – 25 March 1999
- Constituency: Istanbul (1995)

Personal details
- Born: 1948 (age 77–78) Çırdak, Yeşilyurt, Tokat, Turkey
- Party: Democratic Left Party; Republican People's Party
- Children: 2
- Education: Ankara University Faculty of Political Sciences
- Occupation: Politician

Zekeriya Temizel (born 1948 in Çırdak, Yeşilyurt, Tokat), is a Turkish politician.

He graduated from Sivas High School and the Faculty of Political Sciences at Ankara University. In 1982 he completed postgraduate studies at the University of Strasbourg Louis Pasteur in France. He conducted research on the European Monetary System and the European Common Agricultural Policies. In 1985, he worked in the Financial Affairs Division at the OECD.

Between 1970 and 1995 he served in the Ministry of Finance as Finance Inspector, Chief Finance Inspector, Head of Department at the Revenue General Directorate, Deputy General Director, Istanbul Chief Financial Officer (Defterdar) and General Director of Revenues. As Chairman of the Banking Regulation and Supervision Agency, he established the institution. He served as a Board Member at the Press Advertisement Agency, wrote columns for various media outlets, and chaired the Country Policies Foundation. Between 2005 and 2015 he was chairman of the boards of two companies producing high-technology products. He is the author of the research book Ombudsman and the memoir-novel Çekerek Kıyılarında. He was an MP in the Grand National Assembly of Turkey for the 20th term (Istanbul) and the 25th and 26th terms (İzmir). He served as Minister of Finance in the 55th and 56th governments. He is married and has two children. He ran as the DSP candidate for Mayor of Istanbul in the 18 April 1999 elections but did not win. He wrote newspaper columns. On 6 September 2014 he was elected to the Republican People's Party central committee.
