= Samsun (electoral district) =

Electoral district for the Grand National Assembly of Turkey

Coordinates: 41°15′N 36°20′E

- electoral district for the Grand National Assembly of Turkey
- Samsun shown within Turkey
- Province: Samsun
- Electorate: 881,023

Current electoral district
- Created: 1920
- Seats: 9 Historical: 10 (1999-2002) 9 (1987-1995) 8 (1983-1987) 10 (1974-1983) 11 (1961-1974) 14 (1957-1961) 12 (1954-1957)
- MPs: List: Mustafa Demir AKP Suat Kılıç AKP Cemal Yılmaz Demir AKP Tülay Bakır AKP Akif Çağatay Kılıç AKP Ahmet Yeni AKP Ahmet Haluk Koç CHP Ahmet İhsan Kalkavan CHP Cemalettin Şimşek MHP
- Turnout at last election: 86.78%
- Representation
- AK Party: 5 / 9
- CHP: 2 / 9
- MHP: 2 / 9

Samsun is an electoral district of the Grand National Assembly of Turkey. It elects nine members of parliament (deputies) to represent the province of the same name for a four-year term by the D'Hondt method, a party-list proportional representation system.

== Members ==
Population reviews of each electoral district are conducted before each general election, which can lead to certain districts being granted a smaller or greater number of parliamentary seats. Samsun is a medium-sized constituency currently represented by nine MPs, although this has historically been as high as fourteen.

MPs for Samsun, 1999 onwards
Seat	1999 (21st parliament)	2002 (22nd parliament)	2007 (23rd parliament)	2011 (24th parliament)	June 2015 (25th parliament)
MP	Yekta Açıkgöz; DSP	Suat Kılıç; AK Party			Ahmet Demircan; AK Party
MP	Tarık Cengiz; DSP	Cemal Yılmaz Demir; AK Party			Fuat Köktaş; AK Party
MP	Şenel Kapıcı; DSP	Ahmet Yeni; AK Party			Çiğdem Karaaslan; AK Party
MP	Musa Uzunkaya; FP	Mustafa Demir; AK Party			Hasan Basri Kurt; AK Party
MP	Ahmet Demircan; FP	Musa Uzunkaya; AK Party	Birnur Şahinoğlu; AK Party	Akif Çağatay Kılıç; AK Party	
MP	Ahmet Aydın; MHP	Mehmet Kurt; AK Party	Fatih Öztürk; AK Party	Tülay Bakır; AK Party	Hüseyin Edis; MHP
MP	Vedat Çınaroğlu; MHP	Mustafa Çakır; AK Party	Osman Çakır; MHP	Cemalettin Şimşek; MHP	Erhan Usta; MHP
MP	Erdoğan Sezgin; DYP	Ahmet Haluk Koç; CHP			Kemal Zeybek; CHP
MP	Kemal Kabataş; DYP	İlyas Sezai Önder; CHP	Suat Binici; CHP	Ahmet İhsan Kalkavan; CHP	Hayati Tekin; CHP
MP	Mehmet Çakar; Anavatan	Seat abolished			

== General elections ==
=== 2011 ===
2011 Turkish general election: Samsun
List	Candidates	Votes	Of total (%)	± from prev.
AK Party	Mustafa Demir, Suat Kılıç, Cemal Yılmaz Demir, Tülay Bakır, Akif Çağatay Kılıç, Ahmet Yeni	462,067	61.50	
CHP	Ahmet Haluk Koç, Ahmet İhsan Kalkavan	162,718	16.20	
MHP	Cemalettin Şimşek	84,520	11.25	
SAADET	None elected	11,968	1.59	
DP	None elected	7619	1.01	
HAS Party	None elected	7194	0.96	N/A
Büyük Birlik	None elected	5002	0.67	
DYP	None elected	1933	0.26	
DSP	None elected	1859	0.25	'"`UNIQ−−ref−0000000D−QINU`"'
HEPAR	None elected	1702	0.23	
Labour	None elected	1526	0.2	
TKP	None elected	863	0.11	
Nationalist Conservative	None elected	711	0.09	
Independents	None elected	648	0.09	
MP	None elected	613	0.08	
Liberal Democrat	None elected	442	0.06	
Turnout		543,328	89,24	

== Presidential elections ==
=== 2014 ===
Presidential Election 2014: Samsun
Party	Candidate	Votes	%
AK Party	Recep Tayyip Erdoğan	447,253	65.87
Independent	Ekmeleddin İhsanoğlu	222,769	32.81
HDP	Selahattin Demirtaş	8,954	1.32
Total votes		678,976	100.00
Rejected ballots		14,239	2.05
Turnout		693,215	76.19
Recep Tayyip Erdoğan win			
