= Kayseri (electoral district) =

Electoral district for the Grand National Assembly of Turkey

Coordinates: 38°45′N 35°55′E

- electoral district for the Grand National Assembly of Turkey
- Kayseri shown within Turkey
- Province: Kayseri
- Electorate: 830,282

Current electoral district
- Created: 1923
- Seats: 9 Historical: 8 (1999-2011) 9 (1995-1999) 7 (1991-1995) 8 (1987-1991) 7 (1983-1987) 8 (1961-1983) 11 (1957-1961) 10 (1954-1957)
- MPs: List: Taner Yıldız AKP Sadık Yakut AKP Mustafa Elitaş AKP Yaşar Karayel AKP Pelin Gündeş Bakır AKP Ahmet Öksüzkaya AKP İsmail Taner AKP Yusuf Halaçoğlu MHP Mehmet Şevki Kulkuloğlu CHP
- Turnout at last election: 89.93%
- Representation
- AK Party: 5 / 9
- MHP: 3 / 9
- CHP: 1 / 9

Kayseri is an electoral district of the Grand National Assembly of Turkey. It elects nine members of parliament (deputies) to represent the province of the same name for a four-year term by the D'Hondt method, a party-list proportional representation system.

== Members ==
Population reviews of each electoral district are conducted before each general election, which can lead to certain districts being granted a smaller or greater number of parliamentary seats. Kayseri had elected eight members for several years until the most recent election in 2011, when the number of seats was raised to nine.

MPs for Kayseri, 1999 onwards
Seat	1999 (21st parliament)	2002 (22nd parliament)	2007 (23rd parliament)	2011 (24th parliament)	June 2015 (25th parliament)
1	Salih Kapusuz; Virtue	Taner Yıldız; AK Party			Ahmet Doğan; AK Party
2	Sadık Yakut; MHP	Sadık Yakut; AK Party			Mehmet Özhaseki; AK Party
3	Sevgi Esen; DYP	Mustafa Elitaş; AK Party			Havva Talay Çalış; AK Party
4	Hasan Basri Üstünbaş; MHP	Adem Baştürk; AK Party	Yaşar Karayel; AK Party		
5	Abdullah Gül; Virtue	Abdullah Gül; AK Party		Pelin Gündeş Bakır; AK Party	Kemal Tekden; AK Party
6	Osman Durmuş; MHP	Mustafa Duru; AK Party	Ahmet Öksüzkaya; AK Party		Ali Kilci; MHP
7	Sabahattin Çakmakoğlu; MHP	Niyazi Özcan; AK Party	Sabahattin Çakmakoğlu; MHP	Yusuf Halaçoğlu; MHP	
8	İsmail Cem; DSP	Muharrem Eskiyapan; CHP	Mehmet Şevki Kulkuloğlu; CHP		Süleyman Korkmaz; MHP
9	No seat			İsmail Taner; AK Party	Çetin Arık; CHP

== General elections ==
=== 2011 ===
General Election 2011: Kayseri
Party	Candidate	Votes	%	±%
AK Party	7 elected ▲1: 1. Taner Yıldız ✓; 2. Sadık Yakut ✓; 3. Mustafa Elitaş ✓; 4. Yaşar Karayel ✓; 5. Pelin Gündeş Bakır ✓; 6. Ahmet Öksüzkaya ✓; 7. İsmail Tamer ✓; 8. Murat Cahid Cıngı ✗; 9. Mehmet Adıgüzel ✗	478,357	64.90	▼0.83
MHP	1 elected 0: 1. Yusuf Halaçoglu ✓; 2. Nihat Canpolat ✗; 3. Mazhar Gündoğ ✗; 4. Hüseyin Tekin ✗; 5. Ünal Polat ✗; 6. Sami Eker ✗; 7. Ayfer Solak ✗; 8. Levent Livdumlu ✗; 9. Faruk Çolak ✗	132,988	18.04	▲2.60
CHP	1 elected 0: 1. Mehmet Şevki Kulkuloğlu ✓; 2. Çetin Arık ✗; 3. Ali Paşa Tan ✗; 4. Türker Tok ✗; 5. Figen Alçı ✗; 6. Emin Yıldırım ✗; 7. Ömer Bayrak ✗; 8. İsmail Yavuz ✗; 9. Ali Kemal Açılkan ✗	89,493	12.14	▲2.32
Büyük Birlik	None elected: 1. Kadir Hikmet Bayazıt ✗; 2. Ömer Faruk Gunca ✗; 3. Ramazan Silay ✗; 4. Hikmet Tamer ✗; 5. Halil Çıklaçevik ✗; 6. Şeref Özel ✗; 7. Nursen Şahin ✗; 8. Vahdi Köroğlu ✗; 9. Hasan Karaalp ✗	10,026	1.36	▲1.36
SAADET	None elected: 1. Haşim Özçelik ✗; 2. Ahmet Recai Tekin ✗; 3. Duran Soyuğur ✗; 4. Güzün Yiğit ✗; 5. Güner Şahin ✗; 6. İllas Yıldız ✗; 7. Mehmet Yaşar Paköz ✗; 8. Ahmet Ulusoy ✗; 9. Ahmet Fatih Karaman ✗	9,914	1.35	▼0.71
HAS Party	None elected: 1. Lütfi Aslanhan ✗; 2. Hülya Öztürk ✗; 3. Hasan Balcı ✗; 4. Fatma Oytun ✗; 5. Mustafa Ulu ✗; 6. Volkan Kıraç ✗; 7. Hasan Doğanay ✗; 8. Mustafa Köseahmetoglu ✗; 9. Sadullah Kavak ✗	5,666	0.77	▲0.77
DP	None elected: 1. Osman Çilsal ✗; 2. Mustafa Tekin ✗; 3. Rüştü Karataş ✗; 4. İbrahim Yusufoğlu ✗; 5. Gülay Teke ✗; 6. Ahmet Refik Özçoban ✗; 7. Hamza Dinçer ✗; 8. Okan Özgür Özturan ✗; 9. Naci Demir ✗	3,904	0.53	▼2.44
HEPAR	None elected: 1. İrfan Altıparmak ✗; 2. Ümit Dogan ✗; 3. Neziha Akkaya ✗; 4. Hatice Kahraman ✗; 5. Tahsin Yener ✗; 6. Göknur Göktürk Halaç ✗; 7. Naci Yavuz ✗; 8. Oktay Erdogdu ✗; 9. Hasan Gürbüz ✗	1,312	0.18	▲0.18
DSP	None elected: 1. Memduh Taşkın ✗; 2. Sevin Ulusoy ✗; 3. Osman Türkaslan ✗; 4. Sinan Kolukısa ✗; 5. Ayla Aşıkgil ✗; 6. Erkan Karabulut ✗; 7. Celil Yol ✗; 8. Halil Kılıç ✗; 9. Mustafa Aktaş ✗	1,265	0.17	N/A'"`UNIQ−−ref−0000000E−QINU`"'
DYP	None elected: 1. Seyit Özdemir ✗; 2. Mustafa Akkurt ✗; 3. Durak Karaca Dulkadiroğlu ✗; 4. Türkay Ceylan ✗; 5. Emre Deniz ✗; 6. Murat Polat ✗; 7. Mehmet Bağıç ✗; 8. Bekir Akel ✗; 9. Rukiye Bağıç ✗	1,206	0.16	▲0.16
Labour	None elected: 1. Metin Yıldız ✗; 2. Afet Erdoğan ✗; 3. Bülent Gülcemal ✗; 4. Süleyman Demir ✗; 5. Buket Sarıaslan ✗; 6. Aynur Öner ✗; 7. Mesut Şahin ✗; 8. Afet Alp ✗; 9. Erdin Daşdemir ✗	1,108	0.15	▼0.07
TKP	None elected: 1. Ahmet Tarık Yenil ✗; 2. Nezihe Özdemir ✗; 3. Sibel Güzey ✗; 4. Ayhan Apaydın ✗; 5. Sabahat Şengül ✗; 6. Badem Çamöz ✗; 7. Selma Enginar ✗; 8. Fikret İşeri ✗; 9. Veli Üzgün ✗	552	0.07	▼0.03
Nationalist Conservative	None elected: 1. Dilek Yıkılmaz ✗; 2. Nizamettın Şafak ✗; 3. Ahmet Duran Işık ✗; 4. Deniz Sürücü ✗; 5. Aslıhan Çınar ✗; 6. Ahmet Güçlü ✗; 7. Sona Yılmaz ✗; 8. Osman Alsan ✗; 9. İhsan Kaya ✗	524	0.07	▲0.07
MP	None elected: 1. Mustafa İdiz ✗; 2. Mustafa Temizer ✗; 3. Süleyman Özhan ✗; 4. Fatma Deniz ✗; 5. Fatma Karaoğlu Özyurt ✗; 6. Hasan Özkan ✗; 7. Zeliha Kiraz ✗; 8. Altan Karadağ ✗; 9. Mehmet Özdağ ✗	476	0.06	▲0.06
Independent	None elected: Hasan Parkan ✗	261	0.04	▼0.41
Liberal Democrat	No candidates	0	0.00	▼0.09
Total votes		737,052	100.00	
Rejected ballots		11,987	1.61	▲0.68
Turnout		746,669	89.93	▲1.41
AK Party hold Majority		345,369	46.86	▼3.24

=== June 2015 ===
Abbr.	Party	Votes	%
AK Party	Justice and Development Party	409,658	52.4%
MHP	Nationalist Movement Party	217,384	27.8%
CHP	Republican People's Party	97,165	12.4%
SP	Felicity Party	24,458	3.1%
HDP	Peoples' Democratic Party	18,070	2.3%
	Other	14,886	1.9%
Total		781,621	
Turnout		88.56	
source: YSK

=== November 2015 ===
Abbr.	Party	Votes	%
AK Party	Justice and Development Party	528,722	65.6%
MHP	Nationalist Movement Party	148,034	18.4%
CHP	Republican People's Party	98,665	12.2%
HDP	Peoples' Democratic Party	10,374	1.3%
SP	Felicity Party	6,026	0.7%
	Other	14,540	1.8%
Total		781,621	
Turnout		89.90	
source: YSK

=== 2018 ===
Abbr.	Party	Votes	%
AK Party	Justice and Development Party	420,880	49.6%
MHP	Nationalist Movement Party	182,076	21.5%
CHP	Republican People's Party	102,885	12.1%
IYI	Good Party	94,607	11.1%
HDP	Peoples' Democratic Party	16,193	1.9%
SP	Felicity Party	14,733	1.7%
	Other	17,328	2%
Total		848,702	
Turnout		90.77	
source: YSK

== Presidential elections ==
=== 2014 ===
Presidential Election 2014: Kayseri
Party	Candidate	Votes	%
AK Party	Recep Tayyip Erdoğan	474,516	66.13
Independent	Ekmeleddin İhsanoğlu	229,790	32.02
HDP	Selahattin Demirtaş	13,266	1.85
Total votes		717,572	100.00
Rejected ballots		15,449	2.11
Turnout		733,021	82.65
Recep Tayyip Erdoğan win			
