= Mersin (electoral district) =

Electoral district for the Grand National Assembly of Turkey

Coordinates: 36°45′N 34°00′E

- electoral district for the Grand National Assembly of Turkey
- Mersin shown within Turkey
- Province: Mersin
- Electorate: 1,304,186

Current electoral district
- Created: 1923
- Seats: 13 Historical: 12 (1995-2011)
- MPs: List: Lütfi Elvan AKP Ali Cumhur Taşkın AKP Zeynep Gül Yılmaz AKP Hacı Özkan AKP Cengiz Gökçel CHP Alpay Antmen CHP Ali Mahir Başarır CHP Fatma Kurtulan HDP Rıdvan Turan HDP Zeki Hasan Sıdalı İYİ Behiç Çelik İYİ Baki Şimşek MHP Olcay Kılavuz MHP
- Turnout at last election: 88.75%
- Representation
- AK Party: 4 / 13
- CHP: 3 / 13
- HDP: 2 / 13
- İYİ: 2 / 13
- MHP: 2 / 13

Mersin is an electoral district of the Grand National Assembly of Turkey. It elects eleven members of parliament (deputies) to represent the province of the same name for a four-year term by the D'Hondt method, a party-list proportional representation system.

== Members ==
Population reviews of each electoral district are conducted before each general election, which can lead to certain districts being granted a smaller or greater number of parliamentary seats. Mersin elected 12 members until the most recent election in 2011, when the number of seats was dropped to eleven.

MPs for Mersin, 1999 onwards
Seat	1999 (21st parliament)	2002 (22nd parliament)	2007 (23rd parliament)	2011 (24th parliament)	June 2015 (25th parliament)
MP	Edip Özgenç; DSP / YTP	Ali Oksal; CHP		Aytuğ Atıcı; CHP	
MP	Akif Serin; DSP / YTP	Ersoy Bulut; CHP	Vahap Seçer; CHP		Hüseyin Çamak; CHP
MP	Mustafa İstemihan Talay; DSP / YTP	Hüseyin Güler; CHP / Anavatan	İsa Gök; CHP		Durmuş Fikri Sağlar; CHP
MP	Yalçın Kaya; MHP	Hüseyin Özcan; CHP / Anavatan	Ali Rıza Öztürk; CHP		Baki Şimşek; MHP
MP	Hidayet Kılınç; MHP	Mustafa Özyürek; CHP	Mehmet Şandır; MHP		Oktay Öztürk; MHP
MP	Cahit Tekelioğlu; MHP	Şefik Zengin; CHP	Akif Akkuş; MHP	Ali Öz; MHP	
MP	Enis Öksüz; MHP / BBP	Vahit Çekmez; CHP	Kadir Ural; MHP	Ertuğrul Kürkçü; Independent (BDP)	Dengir Mir Mehmet Fırat; HDP
MP	Ali Er; Motherland / AK Party			Mehmet Zafer Çağlayan; AK Party	Çilem Öz; HDP
MP	Rüştü Kazım Yücelen; Motherland	Ömer İnan; AK Party		Çiğdem Münevver Ökten; AK Party	Mustafa Muhammet Gültak; AK Party
MP	Turhan Güven; DYP	Saffet Benli; AK Party / Motherland	Kürşad Tüzmen; AK Party	Ahmet Tevfik Uzun; AK Party	Yılmaz Tezcan; AK Party
MP	Ayfer Yılmaz; DYP	Mustafa Eyiceoğlu; AK Party	Mehmet Zafer Üskül; AK Party	Nebi Bozkur; AK Party	Muhsin Kızılkaya; AK Party
MP	Ali Güngör; MHP / Independent	Dengir Mir Mehmet Fırat; AK Party	Kadir Ural; MHP	Seat abolished	

== General elections ==
=== 2011 ===
2011 Turkish general election: Mersin
List	Candidates	Votes	Of total (%)	± from prev.
AK Party	Mehmet Zafer Çağlayan, Ahmet Tevfik Uzun, Nebi Bozkur, Çiğdem Münevver Ökten	311,050	32.00	
CHP	Aytuğ Atıcı, Vahap Seçer, İsa Gök, Ali Rıza Öztürk	310,714	31.96	
MHP	Mehmet Şandır, Ali Öz	224,477	23.09	
Independents	Ertuğrul Kürkçü	93,876	9.66	
Büyük Birlik	None elected	6954	0.72	
DP	None elected	6392	0.66	
SAADET	None elected	4863	0.50	
HAS Party	None elected	3632	0.37	N/A
DYP	None elected	2216	0.23	
MP	None elected	2122	0.22	
DSP	None elected	1852	0.19	'"`UNIQ−−ref−0000000D−QINU`"'
TKP	None elected	1520	0.16	
HEPAR	None elected	1487	0.15	
Nationalist Conservative	None elected	891	0.09	
Labour	None elected	0		
Liberal Democrat	None elected	0		
Turnout		521,086	88.16	

=== June 2015 ===
Abbr.	Party	Votes	%
CHP	Republican People's Party	298,278	28.9%
AK Party	Justice and Development Party	266,760	25.9%
MHP	Nationalist Movement Party	255,705	24.8%
HDP	Peoples' Democratic Party	184,018	17.9%
SP	Felicity Party	10,603	1%
	Other	15,267	1.5%
Total		1,030,631	
Turnout		86.62	
source: YSK

=== November 2015 ===
Abbr.	Party	Votes	%
AK Party	Justice and Development Party	325,723	31.1%
CHP	Republican People's Party	319,630	30.5%
MHP	Nationalist Movement Party	224,219	21.4%
HDP	Peoples' Democratic Party	156,873	15%
SP	Felicity Party	3,765	0.4%
	Other	18,506	1.8%
Total		1,048,716	
Turnout		87.41	
source: YSK

=== 2018 ===
Abbr.	Party	Votes	%
AK Party	Justice and Development Party	302,200	27.4%
CHP	Republican People's Party	296,514	26.9%
HDP	Peoples' Democratic Party	186,663	16.9%
IYI	Good Party	151,924	13.8%
MHP	Nationalist Movement Party	139,581	12.7%
SP	Felicity Party	7,515	0.7%
HÜDA-PAR	Free Cause Party	4,486	0.4%
	Other	13,675	1.2%
Total		1,102,558	
Turnout		88.45	
source: YSK

== Presidential elections ==
=== 2014 ===
Presidential Election 2014: Mersin
Party	Candidate	Votes	%
Independent	Ekmeleddin İhsanoğlu	496,780	54.56
AK Party	Recep Tayyip Erdoğan	291,231	31.98
HDP	Selahattin Demirtaş	122,561	13.46
Total votes		910,572	100.00
Rejected ballots		12,537	1.36
Turnout		923,109	77.31
Ekmeleddin İhsanoğlu win			
