= List of female ministers of Turkey =

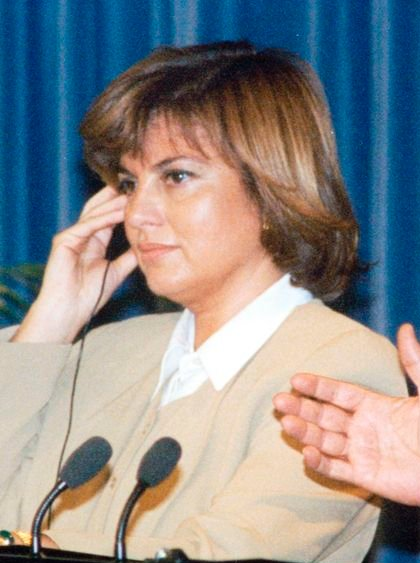
Tansu Çiller, Turkey's first and only female prime minister, who held the highest position in the cabinet

With Nihat Erim's appointment of Türkan Akyol as the Minister of Health and Social Assistance in the 33rd Government of Turkey, which was established on March 26, 1971, a woman took part in the government as a minister for the first time. Since Akyol became a minister, 28 different women have served as ministers in the cabinet of the Turkish government 43 times. The ministry to which women were most appointed was the Ministry of State with 15 appointments. With the abolition of the Ministry of State in 2011, Selma Aliye Kavaf became the last female minister of state. The Ministry of State was followed by the Ministry of Family and Social Services, which operates under different names, with 10 appointments.

While the first two female ministers in the cabinet were elected from outside the parliament, all the remaining female ministers, except Aysel Çelikel, Beril Dedeoğlu, Ayşen Gürcan, Zehra Zümrüt Selçuk, Ruhsar Pekcan, Derya Yanık and Mahinur Özdemir Göktaş, were elected from within the parliament. In terms of parties, the Justice and Development Party was the party that produced the most number of female ministers with 10 different ministers, followed by the Social Democratic Populist Party and True Path Party with three different ministers each. The government that provided the most female ministers was the 54th government with 4 female ministers. In this government; Tansu Çiller served as both prime minister and foreign minister, Meral Akşener as interior minister, and Ayfer Yılmaz and Işılay Saygın as ministers of state. Recep Tayyip Erdoğan became the president who appointed the most female ministers by appointing women to ministries 7 times, followed by Tansu Çiller and Necmettin Erbakan with five appointments each.

While Tayyibe Gülek became the youngest person to be elected as a minister to the 57th Turkish Government at the age of 34, Aysel Çelikel became the oldest woman to be elected as a minister to the same government at the age of 68. İmren Aykut; became the woman who served in the most governments by being a minister in the cabinets of the 46th, 47th, 48th, 53rd, and 55th Turkish Governments. Similarly, Işılay Saygın; became the woman who served in the most governments by being a minister in the cabinets of the 51st, 52nd, 53rd, 54th, and 55th Turkish Governments. Nimet Baş became the woman who has served as a minister for the longest time. She served as minister for 6 years and 4 days. In the first part of her ministry period, Baş served as the minister of state responsible for women and family, and later as the minister of national education.

On August 28, 2015, Ayşen Gürcan became the first headscarved minister.

The first female ministers of the Presidential Government System, which started to be implemented as of July 9, 2018, were Zehra Zümrüt Selçuk and Ruhsar Pekcan.

Türkân Akyol, the first female minister of health; Hayriye Ayşe Nermin Neftçi, the first female minister of culture and tourism; İmren Aykut, the first female minister of family and social services and the first female minister of state; Işılay Saygın, the first female minister of environment, urbanization and climate change; Tansu Çiller, the first female foreign minister; Meral Akşener, the first female minister of interior; Nimet Baş became the first female minister of national education and Beril Dedeoğlu became the first female European Union minister.

Mahinur Özdemir Göktaş, who was appointed as the minister of family and social services in the 67th Government of Turkey established on June 4, 2023, continues to serve as the only female minister today.

== History ==
=== The first female ministers (1971–1991) ===
==== First female minister ====
I will put forth all my efforts not to embarrass those who deem me worthy of this position, and to show that a woman can serve as a minister. This is an honor, a great honor, a great honor as a woman.

— Türkan Akyol's statement on the ninth page of Hürriyet, published on 24 March 1971

From the 1st Government of Turkey, which was established on October 30, 1923, to the 32nd Government of Turkey, which ended on March 26, 1971, no woman served as a minister in the Turkish government. After the 32nd government was forced to resign with the March 12 Memorandum, those who published this memorandum assigned CHP's Nihat Erim to form the new government as the "impartial prime minister". Thereupon, Erim appointed Türkan Akyol as the minister of health and social assistance, upon the request of Sadi Koçaş, to the new government he established on March 26, 1971, in which he said "My cabinet will be a think tank" and "I will work with young minds". Thus, Akyol became the first female minister of the Republic of Türkiye. According to Erim, Akyol was appointed not only because she was a woman, but also to prove the results of Atatürk's reforms. Ten days after taking office, ten ministers, including Akyol, submitted their resignations to Erim, but the resignation did not take place when Erim backed down. Later, on December 2, 11 ministers, including Akyol, submitted their resignations to Erim. The next day, Erim deemed it appropriate to present the resignation of the entire government to President Cevdet Sunay, "instead of accepting the resignations of the ministers who requested their resignations and continuing their duties." On the same day, Sunay accepted the resignation of the government and the 33rd Government ended after continuing its duty for about a week until the new government was established. Akyol's duty ended with the government.

==== First female culture minister ====
There were no female ministers in the four governments that followed Akyol's government. With the 38th Government established on November 17, 1974, Hayriye Ayşe Nermin Neftçi was appointed as the minister of culture in the cabinet and became the first female minister of culture. She was also Turkey's second minister of culture after Talât Sait Halman. In the vote held in the parliament on November 29, 1974, the government could not collect enough votes of confidence and could only survive for 4 months and 14 days. After Neftçi's ministry, there was the longest period in which female ministers did not take office since the proclamation of the republic. There have been no female ministers in seven governments since the last government.

==== First elected female minister and first female Minister of Labor and Social Security ====
A female minister found a place in the government again when Turgut Özal appointed İmren Aykut, who joined the party upon his invitation, as the Minister of Labor and Social Security in the 46th Government he established on December 21, 1987. In addition to being the first woman to be appointed as a minister in this branch, Aykut also became the first female minister who was elected and not independent. Aykut, who remained in office until the end of this government, continued her ministry position in the next government. Thus, she became the first woman to be a minister for two consecutive terms.

==== Establishment of the Ministry of State for Women, first female prime minister period (1991–1996) ====
On April 20, 1990, the Presidency of Women's Status and Problems was established within the Ministry of Labor and Social Security. Later, the institution was affiliated with the Prime Ministry on 23 June 1991. On the same day that the institution was affiliated with the Prime Ministry, the 48th Government was established and İmren Aykut was appointed as the Minister of State in this government, gaining a place in the government for the third time in a row. Aykut was given the duties of General Directorate of Press-Broadcasting and Information, General Directorate of Anadolu Agency, General Directorate of Women's Status and Problems, and also became both the government spokesperson and the Minister of State Responsible for Women. As a result of the 1991 elections, she gained a place in the parliament, but remained outside the government that followed. On November 9, 1991, Süleyman Demirel said that "a series of ministries, including the Ministry of Women", would be opened. When Demirel appointed Güler İleri and Tansu Çiller as Ministers of State in the new government he formed, for the first time, two women were in the cabinet as ministers at the same time. Çiller became Minister of State for Economy, and İleri became Minister of State for Women and Family. While Çiller was responsible from Germany, France and Japan, İleri was responsible from Czechoslovakia, Poland and Romania. İleri resigned from her post on February 22, 1992, following a vote of no confidence in her for covering her personal expenses from the budget allocated to the ministry. After the resignation of İleri, the first female minister, Türkan Akyol, was appointed to the vacant Ministry of State for Women and Family. Çiller and Akyol continued their duties until the end of the period. Thus, three different women served as ministers in the 49th Government.

==== First female prime minister term ====
The following government was formed on June 25, 1993. While Akyol continued in the same position, Çiller became the first woman to hold this position as prime minister. Akyol resigned after remaining in office until July 25, 1994, and her resignation was approved by Demirel two days later. Önay Alpago was appointed as the Minister of State Responsible for Women. Alpago also resigned from her position on March 27, 1995, her resignation was approved on the same day and Aysel Baykal was appointed as her replacement. Baykal continued her duty until the end of the government on October 5, 1995. The 50th Government, like the 49th Government, hosted 3 different female ministers. While Çiller continued her duty as prime minister in the 51st Government, the only female minister of the minority government was Işılay Saygın, who was appointed as the Minister of State Responsible for Women. This established government ended after 25 days as it could not receive sufficient votes of confidence. In the subsequent government, Çiller continued to serve as prime minister, while Saygın continued to serve as the minister of state responsible for women and family until February 23, 1996. Saygın was appointed as environment minister by Çiller on February 23. Saygın, the first female minister of environment, continued her duty until the end of the government. As the government ended on March 6, 1996, Çiller's prime ministry also ended.

=== Pre-AK Party governments (1996–2002) ===
==== The first government after Tansu Çiller's premiership ====
Mesut Yılmaz was appointed as the prime minister after Tansu Çiller. In the 53rd Government established by Yılmaz on March 6, 1996, 3 women became ministers at the same time for the first time. İmren Aykut, as the Minister of State responsible for women and family, found herself as a minister again after 4 governments. Işılay Saygın also became a minister two times in a row. While Saygın was the minister of environment in the previous government, this time she was appointed as the minister of tourism and became the first woman to be the minister of tourism. Along with the duo, a new name, Ayfer Yılmaz, was appointed as the Ministry of State responsible for the EU. Later, Yılmaz was given the presidency of the Turkish Standards Institute, National Productivity Center, Turkish Statistical Institute, relations with the European Union and TRNC, while Aykut was given the presidency of the Social Services and Child Protection Institution, Family Research Institution and the General Directorate of Women's Status and Problems. Later, on March 26, three female ministers of the government attended the afternoon tea held at the American embassy as part of Hillary Clinton's visit to Ankara. Each of the female ministers continued their ministerial duties until the end of the government.

==== 54th Turkish Government ====
54th government of Turkey was established on 28 June 1996, in partnership with RP and DYP. Prime Minister Necmettin Erbakan became the Minister of Foreign Affairs and Deputy Prime Minister Tansu Çiller. The ministries of Ayfer Yılmaz and Işılay Saygın changed. While Yılmaz was appointed as the Minister of State Responsible for Foreign Trade and assigned to the Capital Markets Board, the Undersecretariat of Foreign Trade and the Undersecretariat of Customs, Saygın was appointed as the Minister of State Responsible for Women and Family and was appointed to the Atatürk High Institution of Culture, Language and History, General Directorate of Women's Status and Problems, Family Research. The Presidency of the Institution and the General Directorate of Land Registry and Cadastre were connected. In addition to these three names, Meral Akşener was appointed to the Ministry of Internal Affairs seat, which became vacant as a result of Mehmet Ağar's resignation, on 8 November 1996, and for the first time, a woman was appointed to this position. Thus, for the first time, a government saw four different female ministers and hosted all four at the same time. No subsequent government has appointed more female ministers.

==== The last government with İmren Aykut and Işılay Saygın ====
The 55th Government was established on June 30, 1997, and in this government, İmren Aykut was the Minister of Environment and Işılay Saygın was the Minister of State Responsible for Women and Family. This was the last government in which the duo took part. Thus, the duo became the women who served the most as ministers in five different governments. In the subsequent government, there were no female ministers, and it was the last period of the republican period in which there were no female ministers. Previously, there had been at least one woman in every cabinet since the 46th Government. Thus, the longest cabinet series with female ministers came to an end.

==== The last period before the AK Party ====
The new government, which was established after the government without female ministers, was established on 28 May 1999. When the government was first established, there were no female ministers. In 2002, the last year of the cabinet, three female ministers were appointed to the government. First, on July 10, 2002, Melda Bayer was appointed as the Minister Responsible for Women and Family, which became vacant as a result of the resignation of Hasan Gemici. Two days later, another woman, Tayyibe Gülek, was appointed to the position of Minister Responsible for Cyprus and Citizens Living Abroad, which was vacated by Şükrü Sina Gürel. She became the youngest person to be appointed to the position among both female ministers and general ministers, and she still holds these records. As the last woman in this government, Aysel Çelikel was independently appointed as Minister of Justice on 5 August 2002, a first in the position. Additionally, she was appointed to the ministry at the age of 68, making her the oldest female minister. During this period, three women became ministers and it became the last government without the AK Party.

=== AK Party government (2002–2018) ===
AK Party became the ruling party with the general election held on November 3, 2002. There has been at least one female minister in all governments established since the party came to power. A total of 12 different women served as ministers in these governments. Nearly half of the female ministers who served in the history of the Republic were appointed during this period.

The Ministry of State position, where women were most frequently appointed with 15 appointments during this period, was abolished in 2011. A new ministry called the Ministry of Family and Social Policies was established to replace the Ministry of State Responsible for Women and Family. Five different ministers served in the newly established ministry until 2018, and all of these ministers were elected from women. In 2018, the ministry was merged with the Ministry of Labor and Social Security to create the Ministry of Family, Labor and Social Services.

==== First AK Party government ====
Since Recep Tayyip Erdoğan was banned from politics, the task of establishing the 58th Government of Turkey was given to Abdullah Gül. Gül formed the new government on 18 November 2002, and the only female minister of the government was Güldal Akşit, who was appointed as the minister of tourism. The government continued its duty until Erdoğan was elected as a member of parliament.

==== Erdoğan's first two governments ====
As a result of repeated elections in Siirt on March 9, 2003, Erdoğan was elected to the parliament as a deputy. Thereupon, the Gül government resigned two days later. On March 14, 2003, the new government was established and Güldal Akşit continued her duty. Akşit, who ended his duty as a result of the merger of culture and tourism ministries with a decision published on 29 April 2003, continued to serve as the Minister of State in charge of women and family. Later on, The General Directorate of Social Services and Child Protection Agency, the Presidency of the Disability Administration, the General Directorate of Women's Status and Problems and Family Research Council were connected. On June 2, 2005, Nimet Baş was replaced by Akşit, who resigned from her post. She was assigned to the Head of all institutions previously affiliated with Akşit, and she was assigned to the Dominican Republic, Jamaica, Albania and Macedonia regarding the Joint Economic Commission. While Baş continued her same duty in the first half of the 60th government, she was appointed as the Minister of National Education in the second half, becoming the first woman appointed to this position. Baş served as minister continuously from June 2, 2005, to June 6, 2011, for a total of 6 years and 4 days. Baş spent 2 years, 2 months and 5 days of this period as the Minister of National Education, and the remainder as the Minister of State Responsible for Women and Family. Selma Aliye Kavaf was appointed as the Minister of State Responsible for Women and Family, which was vacated by her. With the abolition of the Ministry of State in 2011, Kavaf became the last female Minister of State.

==== Establishment of the Ministry of Family and Social Policies ====
Our Ministry of Family and Social Policies will deal with the problems of women, families, children, the elderly and the disabled. In addition, this ministry will be directly responsible for the relatives of the martyrs. The important service units of this new ministry will be: General Directorate of Family and Community Services, General Directorate of Children's Services, General Directorate of the Status of Women, General Directorate of Disabled and Elderly Services, General Directorate of Social Assistance. Within this ministry, we are establishing the Department of Martyrs' Relatives and Veterans in order to deal more closely with the problems of our martyrs and veterans.

— A part of Recep Tayyip Erdoğan's speech at the press conference held at the AK Party Headquarters on June 8, 2011

Six new ministries were established on June 8, 2011, about a month before the end of the 60th government, and one of these ministries was the Ministry of Family and Social Services. Institutions that were previously affiliated with the Ministry of State for Women and Family were affiliated to this ministry. One of the two female ministers of the new government established on July 6, 2011, was Fatma Şahin, who was appointed to this ministry. Later, when Şahin ran for mayor of Gaziantep, he resigned from this position and was replaced by Ayşenur İslam. İslam served as a minister in both this government and the 62nd government.

==== Turkey's first election government ====
Turkey's first election government was established on 28 August 2015. There were two female ministers in the government, which served for approximately 3 months. The first of these was Ayşen Gürcan, who took part in the cabinet as the Minister of Family and Social Services. Gürcan also became Turkey's first headscarved minister. She was followed by Beril Dedeoğlu, who was appointed to the Ministry of European Union Affairs, which became vacant as a result of the resignation of Ali Haydar Konca. Dedeoğlu became the first woman to be appointed to this position.

==== The last Davutoğlu Government and the first Yıldırım Government ====
As a result of the repeated elections in November 2015, the task of forming the government was given to Ahmet Davutoğlu for the last time. In the government formed by Davutoğlu on November 24, 2015, Sema Ramazanoğlu served as the Minister of Family and Social Policies, while Fatma Güldemet Sarı held the position of Minister of Environment and Urbanization. On 22 May 2016, Davutoğlu submitted his resignation from the government to the president. On the same day, Binali Yıldırım was given the task of forming the new government. The last Davutoğlu government continued its duty until Yıldırım established the new government. On May 24, 2016, Yıldırım established the 65th government, and in the first form of the government, Fatma Betül Sayan Kaya was the only female minister as the Minister of Family and Social Policies. Later, with the cabinet change on July 19, 2017, with Jülide Sarıeroğlu being included in the cabinet as the Minister of Labor and Social Security, the number of female ministers in this government increased to two.

=== Presidential System (2018–present) ===
In the governments up to this time, the prime minister established a council of ministers. With the 2017 referendum, both the prime ministry and the council of ministers were abolished. In the new system, the president was made to form a presidential cabinet. This system actually started to be implemented in 2018.

==== New government system ====
As a result of the presidential election held in 2018, Recep Tayyip Erdoğan was elected as president. Erdogan formed his cabinet about two weeks after being elected as president. Zehra Zümrüt Selçuk was appointed to the cabinet as the Minister of Family, Labor and Social Services, and Ruhsar Pekcan as the Minister of Trade. The Ministry of Family, Labor, and Social Services; While the Ministry of Family and Social Policies and the Ministry of Labor and Social Security were two separate ministries, the Ministry of Trade, like them, also provided separate services as the Ministry of Economy and the Ministry of Customs and Trade. While Ministry of Family, Labor and Social Services divided into two ministries – Ministry of Family and Social Policies and the Ministry of Labor and Social Security, the Ministry of Commerce also separated into the Ministry of Economy and the Ministry of Customs and Trade. Additionally, the duo became the first female ministers of the new system. On April 21, 2021, the Ministry of Family, Labor and Social Services was divided into two again by presidential decree. While Derya Yanık was appointed to the Ministry of Family and Social Services, which was formed as a result of the division, the duties of Zehra Zümrüt Selçuk and Ruhsar Pekcan ended. Yanık continued her duty until June 4, 2023. With the establishment of the new government, Mahinur Özdemir Göktaş was appointed as the Ministry of Family and Social Services.

== Female ministers ==
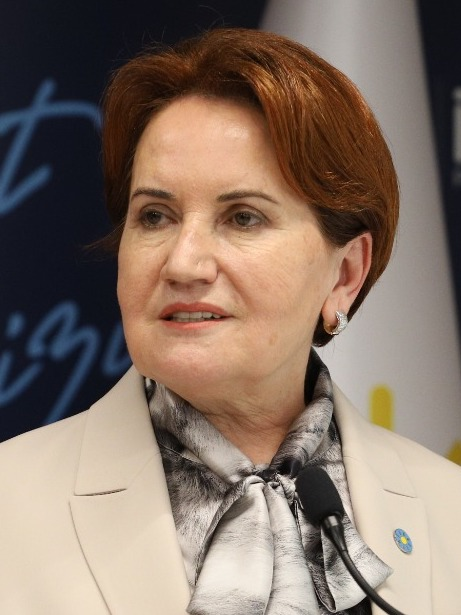
Turkey's first female Minister of Internal Affairs, Meral Akşener

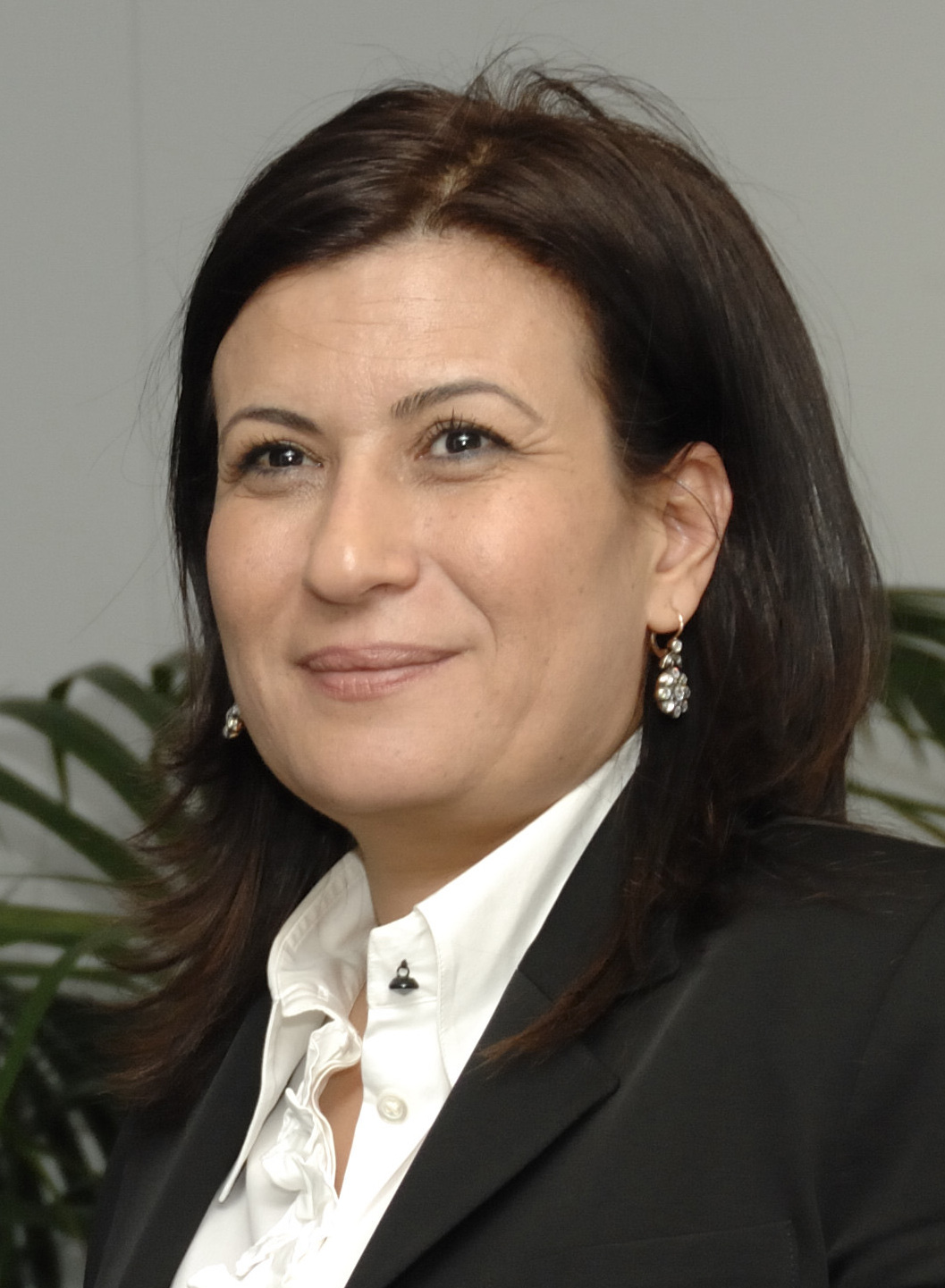
Turkey's first female Minister of National Education Nimet Baş

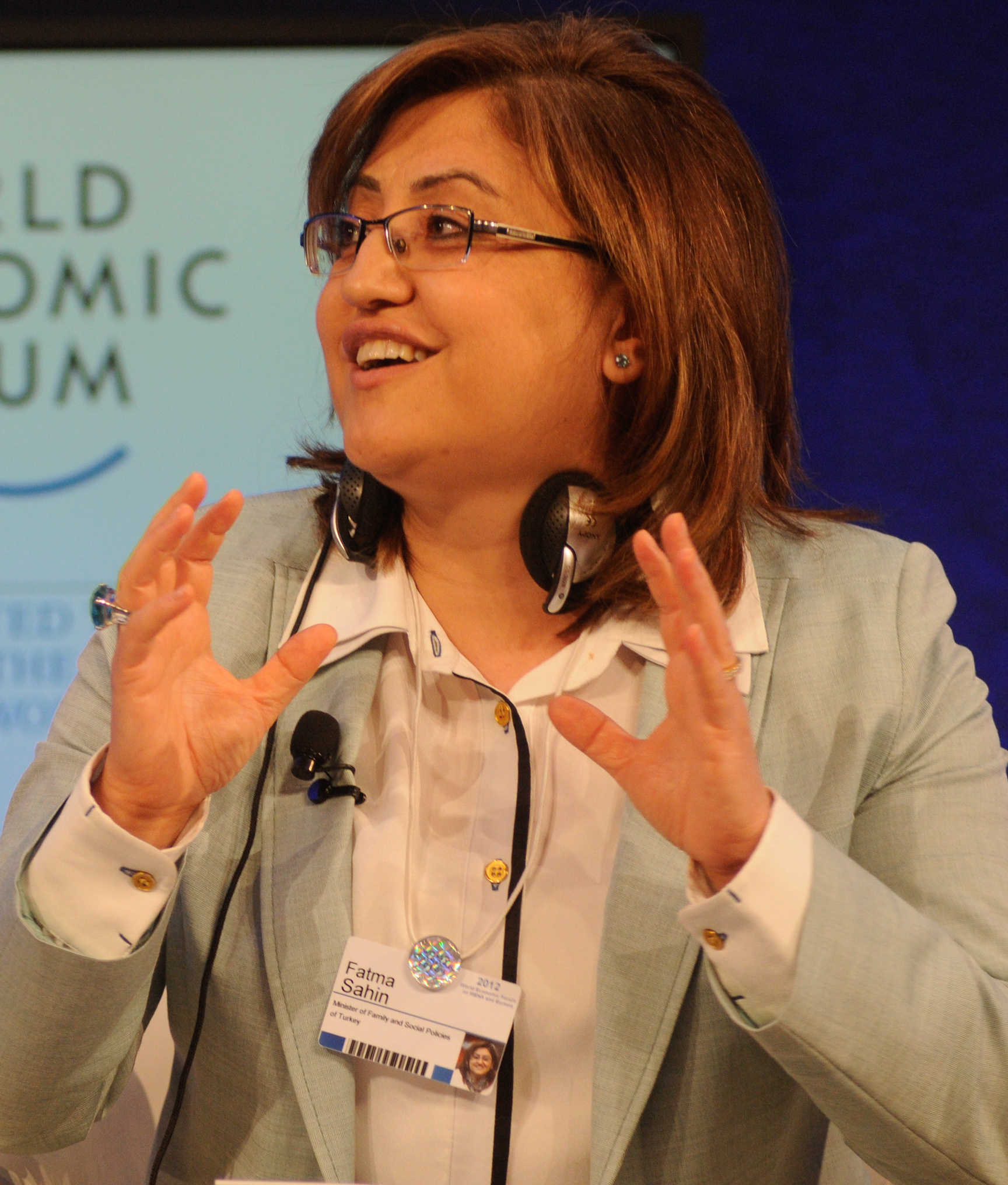
Turkey's first female Minister of Family and Social Policies, Fatma Şahin

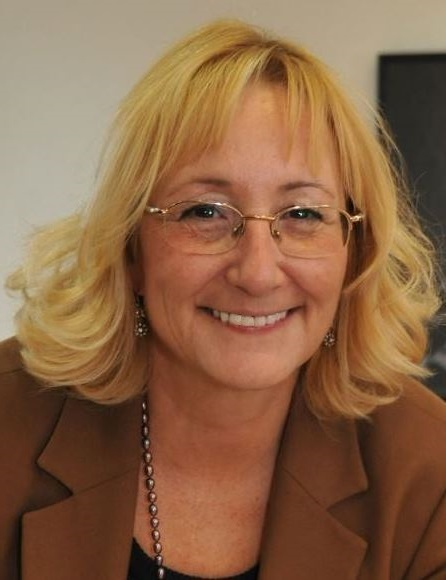
Turkey's first female European Union Minister Beril Dedeoğlu

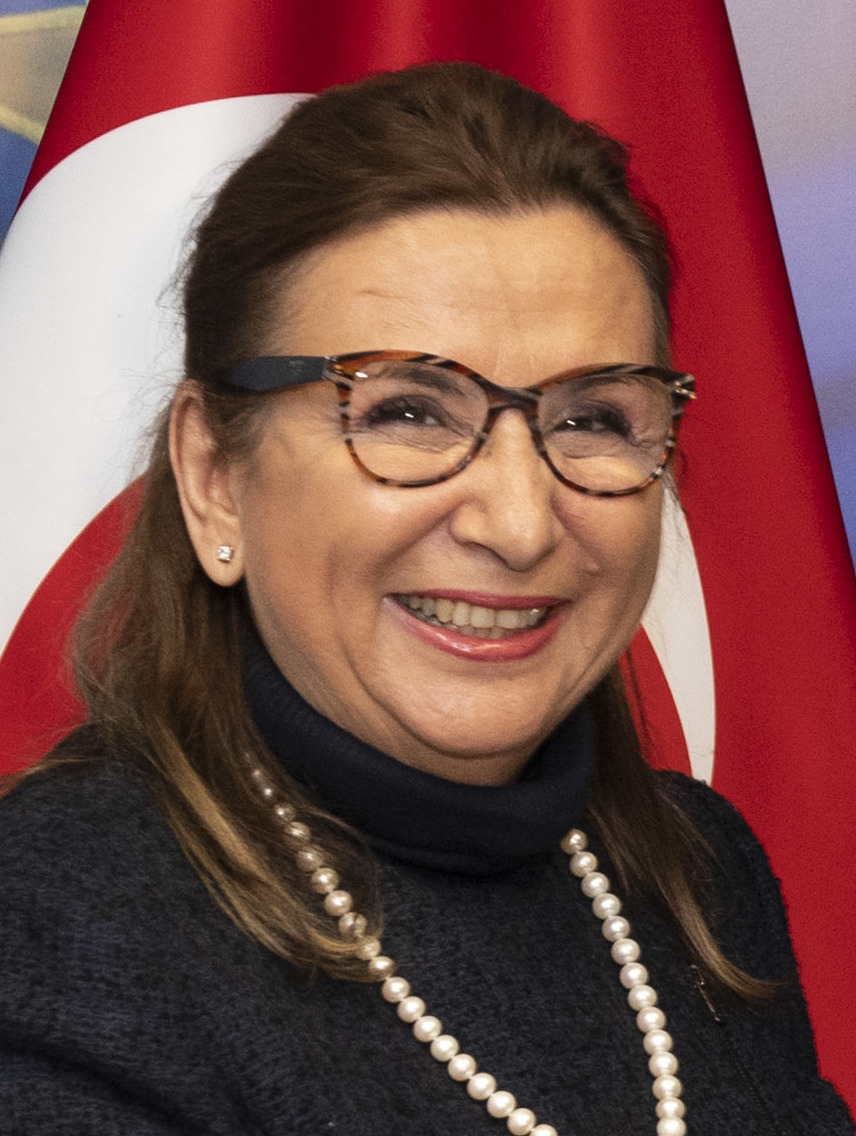
Turkey's first female Minister of Commerce Ruhsar Pekcan

Minister	Ministry	Party	Government	Appointer	Position start date	Position end date	Duty length
Türkân Akyol	Ministry of Health and Social Aid	Independent	33th	Nihat Erim	26 Mart 1971	11 December 1971	8 months, 2 weeks and 1 day
Hayriye Ayşe Nermin Neftçi	Ministry of Culture	Independent	38th	Sadi Irmak	17 November 1974	31 March 1975	4 months and 2 weeks
İmren Aykut	The Ministry of Labor and Social Security	Motherland Party	46th	Turgut Özal	21 December 1987	9 November 1989	3 years, 6 months and 2 days
Işılay Saygın	Ministry of Environment	Motherland Party	52nd	Tansu Çiller	23 February 1996	6 March 1996	4 months and 5 days
Işılay Saygın	Ministry of Tourism	Motherland Party	53th	Mesut Yılmaz	6 March 1996	28 June 1996	4 months and 5 days
Tansu Çiller	Ministry of Foreign Affairs	True Path Party	54th	Necmettin Erbakan	28 June 1996	30 June 1997	1 year and 2 days
Meral Akşener	Ministry of the Interior	True Path Party	54th	Necmettin Erbakan	8 November 1996	30 June 1997	7 months, 3 weeks and 1 day
İmren Aykut	Ministry of Environment	Motherland Party	55th	Mesut Yılmaz	30 June 1997	11 January 1999	1 years, 6 months, 1 weeks and 5 days
Aysel Çelikel	Ministry of Justice	Independent	57th	Bülent Ecevit	5 August 2022	18 November 2002	3 months, 1 week and 6 days
Güldal Akşit	Ministry of Tourism	Justice and Development Party	58th	Abdullah Gül	18 November 2002	29 April 2003	5 months, 1 week and 4 days
Nimet Baş	Ministry of National Education	Justice and Development Party	60th	Recep Tayyip Erdoğan	1 May 2009	6 June 2011	2 years, 1 month and 5 days
Fatma Şahin	Ministry of Family and Social Policies	Justice and Development Party	61st	Recep Tayyip Erdoğan	6 July 2011	25 December 2013	2 years, 5 months, 2 weeks and 5 days
Ayşenur İslam	Ministry of Family and Social Policies	Justice and Development Party	61st	Recep Tayyip Erdoğan	25 December 2013	29 August 2014	1 year, 8 months and 3 days
Ayşenur İslam	Ministry of Family and Social Policies	Justice and Development Party	62nd	Ahmet Davutoğlu	29 August 2014	28 August 2015	1 year, 8 months and 3 days
Ayşen Gürcan	Ministry of Family and Social Policies	Independent	63th	Ahmet Davutoğlu	22 September 2015	24 November 2015	2 months and 2 days
Beril Dedeoğlu	Ministry of European Union	Independent	63th	Ahmet Davutoğlu	22 September 2015	24 November 2015	2 months and 2 days
Sema Ramazanoğlu	Ministry of Family and Social Policies	Justice and Development Party	64th	Ahmet Davutoğlu	24 November 2015	24 May 2016	6 months
Fatma Güldemet Sarı	Ministry of Environment, Urbanisation	Justice and Development Party	64th	Ahmet Davutoğlu	24 November 2015	24 May 2016	6 months
Fatma Betül Sayan Kaya	Ministry of Family and Social Policies	Justice and Development Party	65th	Binali Yıldırım	24 May 2016	10 July 2018	2 years, 1 month, 2 weeks and 2 days
Jülide Sarıeroğlu	The Ministry of Labor and Social Security	Justice and Development Party	65th	Binali Yıldırım	19 July 2017	10 July 2018	11 months and 3 weeks
Zehra Zümrüt Selçuk	Ministry of Family, Labor and Social Services	Independent	66th	Recep Tayyip Erdoğan	10 July 2018	21 April 2021	2 years, 9 months, 1 week and 4 days
Ruhsar Pekcan	Ministry of Trade	Independent	66th	Recep Tayyip Erdoğan	10 July 2018	21 April 2021	2 years, 9 months, 1 week and 4 days
Derya Yanık	Ministry of Family and Social Services	Justice and Development Party	66th	Recep Tayyip Erdoğan	21 April 2021	4 June 2023	2 years, 1 month and 2 weeks
Mahinur Özdemir Göktaş	Ministry of Family and Social Services	Independent	67th	Recep Tayyip Erdoğan	4 June 2023	on duty	2 years, 11 months, 1 week and 6 days

=== Ministries given under the name of Ministry of State ===
Order	Minister	Ministry	Party	Government	Appointer	Position start date	Position end date	Duty length
*	İmren Aykut	State Ministry Responsible for Women and Families	Motherland Party	48th	Mesut Yılmaz	20 April 1990	21 November 1991	7 months and 1 day
1	Güler İleri	State Ministry Responsible for Women and Families	Social Democratic Populist Party	49th	Süleyman Demirel	20 November 1991	22 February 1992	3 months and 2 days
2	Tansu Çiller	State Minister Responsible for Economy	True Path Party	49th	Süleyman Demirel	21 November 1991	25 June 1993	1 year, 7 months and 4 days
*	Türkân Akyol	State Ministry Responsible for Women and Families	Social Democratic Populist Party	49th	Süleyman Demirel	4 March 1992	25 June 1993	2 years, 4 months, 3 weeks and 2 days
*	Türkân Akyol	State Ministry Responsible for Women and Families	Social Democratic Populist Party	50th	Tansu Çiller	25 June 1993	27 July 1994	2 years, 4 months, 3 weeks and 2 days
3	Önay Alpago	State Ministry Responsible for Women and Families	Social Democratic Populist Party	50th	Tansu Çiller	27 July 1994	27 March 1995	8 months
4	Aysel Baykal	State Ministry Responsible for Women and Families	Republican People's Party	50th	Tansu Çiller	27 March 1995	5 October 1995	6 months, 1 week and 1 day
5	Işılay Saygın	State Ministry Responsible for Women and Families	Motherland Party	51st	Tansu Çiller	5 October 1995	30 October 1995	4 months, 2 weeks and 4 days
5	Işılay Saygın	State Ministry Responsible for Women and Families	Motherland Party	52nd	Tansu Çiller	30 October 1995	23 February 1996	4 months, 2 weeks and 4 days
*	İmren Aykut	State Ministry Responsible for Women and Families	Motherland Party	53th	Mesut Yılmaz	6 March 1996	28 June 1996	3 months, 3 weeks and 1 day
6	Ayfer Yılmaz	State Ministry Responsible for EU	True Path Party	53th	Mesut Yılmaz	6 March 1996	28 June 1996	1 year, 3 months, 3 weeks and 3 days
6	Ayfer Yılmaz	State Ministry Responsible for Foreign Trade	True Path Party	54th	Necmettin Erbakan	28 June 1996	30 June 1997	1 year, 3 months, 3 weeks and 3 days
*	Işılay Saygın	State Ministry Responsible for Women and Families	Motherland Party	54th	Necmettin Erbakan	28 June 1996	30 June 1997	1 year, 6 months, 1 week and 5 days
*	Işılay Saygın	State Ministry Responsible for Women and Families	Motherland Party	55th	Mesut Yılmaz	30 June 1997	11 January 1999	1 year, 6 months, 1 week and 5 days
7	Melda Bayer	State Ministry Responsible for Women and Families	Democratic Left Party	57th	Bülent Ecevit	10 July 2002	18 November 2002	4 months, 1 week and 1 day
8	Tayyibe Gülek	State Ministry Responsible for Cyprus and Citizens living abroad	Democratic Left Party	57th	Bülent Ecevit	12 July 2002	18 November 2002	4 months and 6 days
9	Güldal Akşit	State Ministry Responsible for Women and Families	Justice and Development Party	59th	Recep Tayyip Erdoğan	29 April 2003	2 June 2005	2 years, 1 month and 4 days
10	Nimet Baş	State Ministry Responsible for Women and Families	Justice and Development Party	59th	Recep Tayyip Erdoğan	2 June 2005	29 August 2007	3 years, 10 months, 4 weeks and 1 day
10	Nimet Baş	State Ministry Responsible for Women and Families	Justice and Development Party	60th	Recep Tayyip Erdoğan	29 August 2007	1 May 2009	3 years, 10 months, 4 weeks and 1 day
11	Selma Aliye Kavaf	State Ministry Responsible for Women and Families	Justice and Development Party	60th	Recep Tayyip Erdoğan	1 May 2009	6 July 2011	2 years, 2 months and 5 days

== Timeline ==
Distribution of female ministers by parties
1. AKP (34.5%)
2. Independent (27.6%)
3. DYP (10.3%)
4. SHP (10.3%)
5. ANAP (6.90%)
6. DPS (6.90%)
7. CHP (3.44%)

== See also ==
- Women in Turkish politics
- List of cabinets of Turkey
- List of presidents of Turkey
