= Ministry of Family and Social Services =

Government ministry of Turkey

- Aile ve Sosyal Hizmetler Bakanlığı
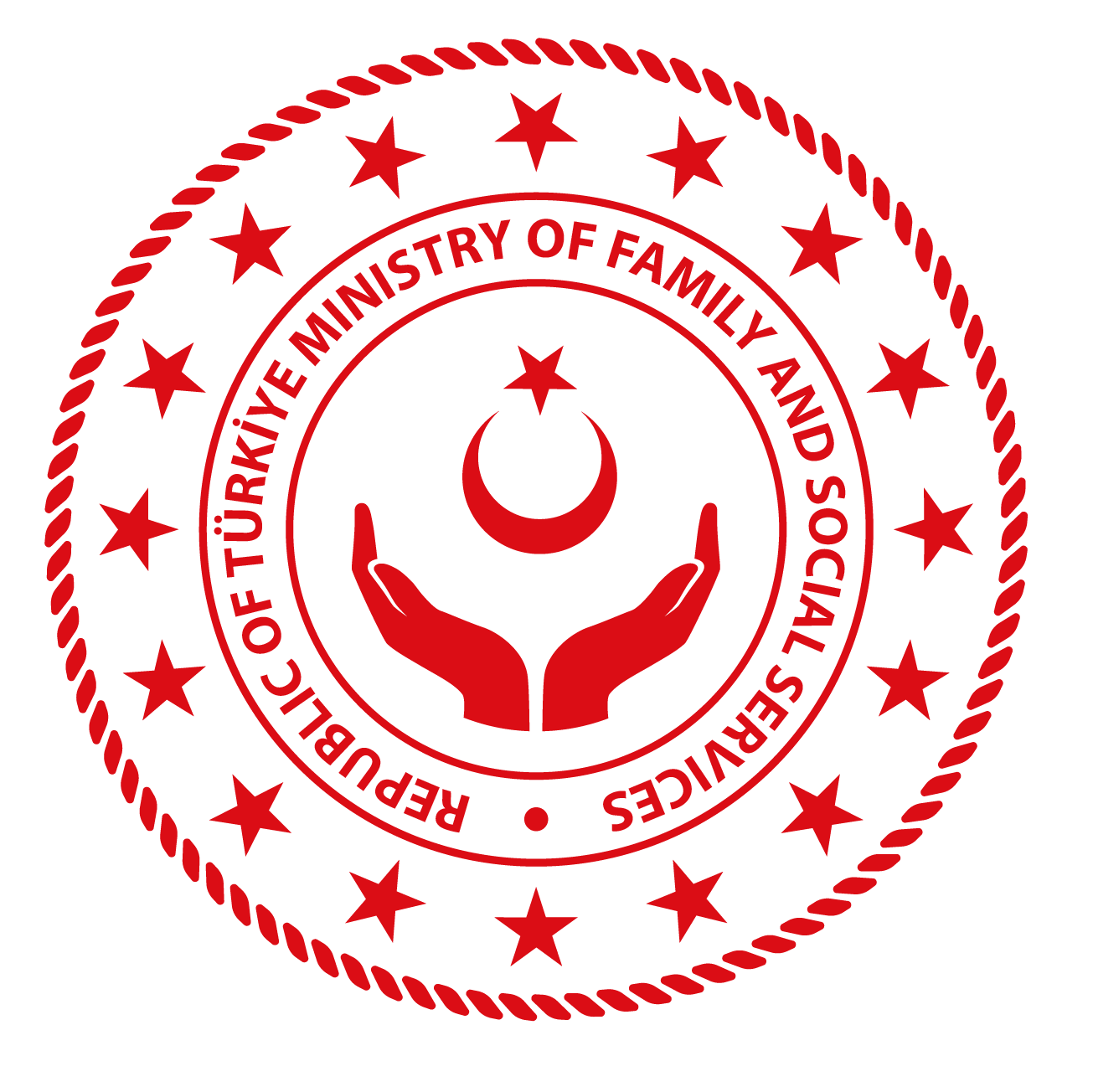

Agency overview
- Formed: 2011
- Headquarters: Ankara
- Minister responsible: Mahinur Özdemir Göktaş
- Deputy Ministers responsible: Rıdvan Duran; Leman Yenigün; Zafer Tarıkdaroğlu; Sevim Sayım Madak
- Website: www.aile.tr

The Ministry of Family and Social Services (Turkish: Aile ve Sosyal Hizmetler Bakanlığı) is a government ministry of the Republic of Türkiye, responsible for family affairs and social services. The ministry is headed by Mahinur Özdemir Göktaş.

== History ==
Before the establishment of the ministry in 2011, the portfolio of women and family affairs was executed by a state minister in the cabinet with the help of the Agency for Social Services and Children Protection (Turkish: Başbakanlık Sosyal Hizmetler ve Çocuk Esirgeme Kurumu). The first head of the new established ministry was Fatma Şahin. In 2018, the ministry was merged with the Ministry of Labour and Social Security to form the Ministry of Family, Labour and Social Services. This merger was undone in 2021, making the Labour and Social Security related tasks headed by a separate minister.

== Organizational Structure ==
At the central level, the ministry is composed of multiple Directorate Generals specialized in providing services to vulnerable groups, as well as more generalized DGs and Departments, some working for the ministry's internal or external administrative functions. At the provincial level, the ministry operates Provincial Directorates of Family and Social Services (PDoFSS) in each 81 provinces of Türkiye and social assistance provision is done through Social Assistance and Solidarity Foundations in each province.

=== Directorate Generals for Service Provision ===
- Directorate General of Family and Public Services (DGFCS)
- Directorate General of Child Services (DGCS)
- Directorate General of Services for Persons with Disabilities and Elderly (DGSPDE)
- Directorate General of Woman's Status (DGWS)
- Directorate General of Social Assistance (DGSA)
- Directorate General of Relatives of Martyrs and Veterans

=== Administrative Departments ===
- Directorate General of Legal Services
- Directorate General of Information Technologies (DGIT)
- Directorate General of Personnel
- Department of EU and External Relations (DEUER)
- Department of Training and Publishing (TPD)
- Presidency of Support Services
- Presidency of Strategic Development (SDP)
- Presidency of Guidance and Inspection
- Presidency of Internal Audit
- Central Directorate of Revolving Funds
- Office of the Press and PR (OPPR)
- Directorate of Private Secretary

=== Related and Associated Organizations ===
- Presidency of the House of Compassion (Darülaceze Başkanlığı)
- Directorate General of Family Institutions
- Social Assistance and Solidarity Foundation (SASF)

== Projects and programs ==
=== Domestic violence ===
The ministry worked out a bill on the "Protection of Family and Prevention of Violence Against Women", which passed on March 8, 2012. After the passage of the bill, 800 men in İzmir received a stay away order for a term between three and six months upon application of their wives to the public prosecutor. Ninety women who had been evicted from their home or were at risk of getting killed by their partners found accommodation in women's shelters.

Following the enactment of the law on domestic violence, the ministry put an electronic device called a panic button into service in September 2012 for use by women in emergency situations of a threat. Additionally, a one-touch mobile phone application was in development for emergency police calls.

According to the records of the ministry, a total of 695 people, including 369 women, lost their lives between 2009 and 2012 as a result of domestic violence. The ministry reported in January 2013 that 6,764 women across the country received police protection. Adana Province ranked in first place with 1,605 women.

The ministry continued to be part of lawsuits on honor killings and child abuses. In a timespan of three months in 2012, the ministry got involved in 17 cases. In some cases, however, the court refused the ministry's request.

In January 2014, the ministry prepared and circulated a manual to inform women about domestic violence, listing patterns of abusive behavior in a relationship with a partner.

=== Disabled and Elderly Care ===
The ministry started a project in 2012 for the establishment of special centers for the care of people with developmental disabilities and Alzheimer's disease.

=== Vocational education for women ===
The ministry, together with the Ministry of National Education, launched a program on "vocational education for women". In one year, it was attended by 780 women from 28 provinces. The most popular class was "Child Care and Technology".

== List of ministers ==
| Name (Born-Died) | Party | Term of Office | | Cabinet |
Minister of State (Responsible for Women and Family Affairs)
| Güler İleri (1948–) | SHP | 20 Nov 1991 | 22 Feb 1992 | Demirel VII |
| Türkân Akyol (1928–2017) | SHP | 4 Mar 1992 | 25 Jun 1993 | Demirel VII |
| Türkân Akyol (1928–2017) | SHP | 25 Jun 1993 | 27 Jul 1994 | Çiller I |
| Önay Alpago | SHP | 27 Jul 1994 | 27 Mar 1995 | Çiller I |
| Aysel Baykal (1939–2003) | CHP | 27 Mar 1995 | 5 Oct 1995 | Çiller I |
| Işılay Saygın (1947– ) | DYP | 5 Oct 1995 | 23 Feb 1996 | Çiller II |
| Işılay Saygın (1947– ) | DYP | 28 Jun 1996 | 11 Jan 1999 | Çiller III |
| Güldal Akşit (1960–2021) | AKP | 29 Apr 2003 | 2 Jun 2005 | Erdoğan I |
| Nimet Çubukçu (1965– ) | AKP | 2 Jun 2005 | 29 Aug 2007 | Erdoğan I |
| Nimet Çubukçu (1965– ) | AKP | 29 Aug 2007 | 2 May 2009 | Erdoğan II |
| Selma Aliye Kavaf (1962– ) | AKP | 2 May 2009 | 6 Jul 2011 | Erdoğan II |
Minister of Family and Social Policy
| Fatma Şahin (1966– ) | AKP | 6 Jul 2011 | 25 Dec 2013 | Erdoğan III |
| Ayşenur İslam (1958– ) | AKP | 25 Dec 2013 | 29 Aug 2014 | Erdoğan III |
| Ayşenur İslam (1958– ) | AKP | 29 Aug 2014 | 28 Aug 2015 | Davutoğlu I |
| Ayşen Gürcan (1963– ) | Indep | 28 Aug 2015 | 17 Nov 2015 | Davutoğlu II |
| Sema Ramazanoğlu (1959– ) | AKP | 24 Nov 2015 | 24 May 2016 | Davutoğlu III |
| Fatma Betül Sayan Kaya (1981– ) | AKP | 24 May 2016 | 10 Jul 2018 | Yıldırım I |
Minister of Family, Labour and Social Policy
| Zehra Zümrüt Selçuk (1979– ) | Indep | 10 Jul 2018 | 21 Apr 2021 | Erdoğan IV |
Minister of Family and Social Services
| Derya Yanık (1972– ) | AKP | 21 Apr 2021 | 3 Jun 2023 | Erdoğan IV |
| Mahinur Özdemir (1982– ) | AKP | 3 Jun 2023 | present | Erdoğan V |
