= Selma Aliye Kavaf =

Turkish politician (born 1962)

Selma Aliye Kavaf MP
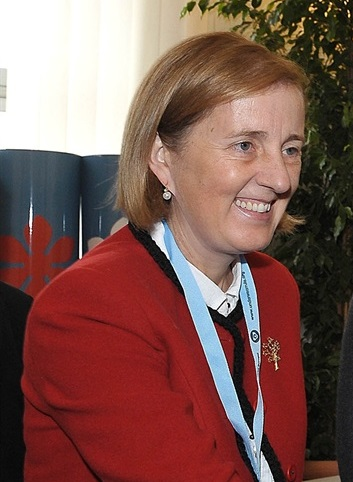

Member of the Grand National Assembly
- Incumbent
- Assumed office 2 June 2023
- Constituency: Manisa (2023)
- In office 23 July 2007 – 23 April 2011
- Constituency: Denizli (2007)

Minister of State (Responsible for Women and Family Affairs)
- In office 1 May 2009 – 6 June 2011
- Preceded by: Nimet Çubukçu
- Succeeded by: Office abolished

President of the Women's Branch of the Justice and Development Party
- In office 2002 – 1 May 2009
- Preceded by: Office established
- Succeeded by: Fatma Şahin

Personal details
- Born: 1 July 1962 (age 64) Denizli, Turkey
- Party: Justice and Development Party (AKP) (2002–2020); Democracy and Progress Party (DEVA) (2020–2025); Republican People's Party (CHP) (2025–present)
- Relatives: Sema Ramazanoğlu (sister)
- Education: Ankara University

Selma Aliye Kavaf (born 1 July 1962) is a Turkish politician. She is the former Minister of State Responsible for Women and Family Affairs, and a member of parliament for Denizli of the ruling Justice and Development Party (AKP).

In the 2023 Turkish parliamentary election, she was elected in Manisa for the Republican People's Party from the National Alliance.

== Early life and career ==
Kavaf was born 1 July 1962. She graduated from the Turkology department of Ankara University Language, History and Geography Faculty. She has worked as a teacher both in public and private schools for seven years. Her sister is Turkish politician Sema Ramazanoğlu.

== Political career ==
Kavaf entered politics in 2002 after the foundation of Justice and Development Party. After the elections, Kavaf was promoted as the Founder General Presidency of Women's Branch of the Justice and Development Party. It is the first women organization of a Turkish political party in an institutional sense.

In the 2007 Turkish general election, Kavaf was elected as a member of parliament. She is the first female MP from Denizli. On 1 May 2009, she was appointed as State Minister Responsible for Women and Family in the second cabinet of Erdoğan. She has stated that she opposes homosexuality, in her own words: "I believe homosexuality is a biological disorder, a disease. It needs to be treated." Her remarks sparked controversy and were protested by anti-homophobia activists in Turkey.

Kavaf is one of the founding members of Ali Babacan's newly formed Democracy and Progress Party (DEVA).

In the 2023 Turkish parliamentary election she was elected in Manisa for the Republican People's Party from the National Alliance quota.

On 8 January 2025, she left the DEVA Party. On 28 January 2025, she rejoined the Republican People's Party.

Political offices
New title Office established	President of the Women's Branch of the Justice and Development Party; 2002 – 1 May 2009	Succeeded by Fatma Şahin
Preceded by Nimet Çubukçu	Minister of State (Responsible for Women and Family Affairs); 1 May 2009 – 6 June 2011	Succeeded by Fatma Şahin as Minister of Family and Social Policy
