= 2017 Dutch–Turkish diplomatic incident =

Dutch–Turkish relations
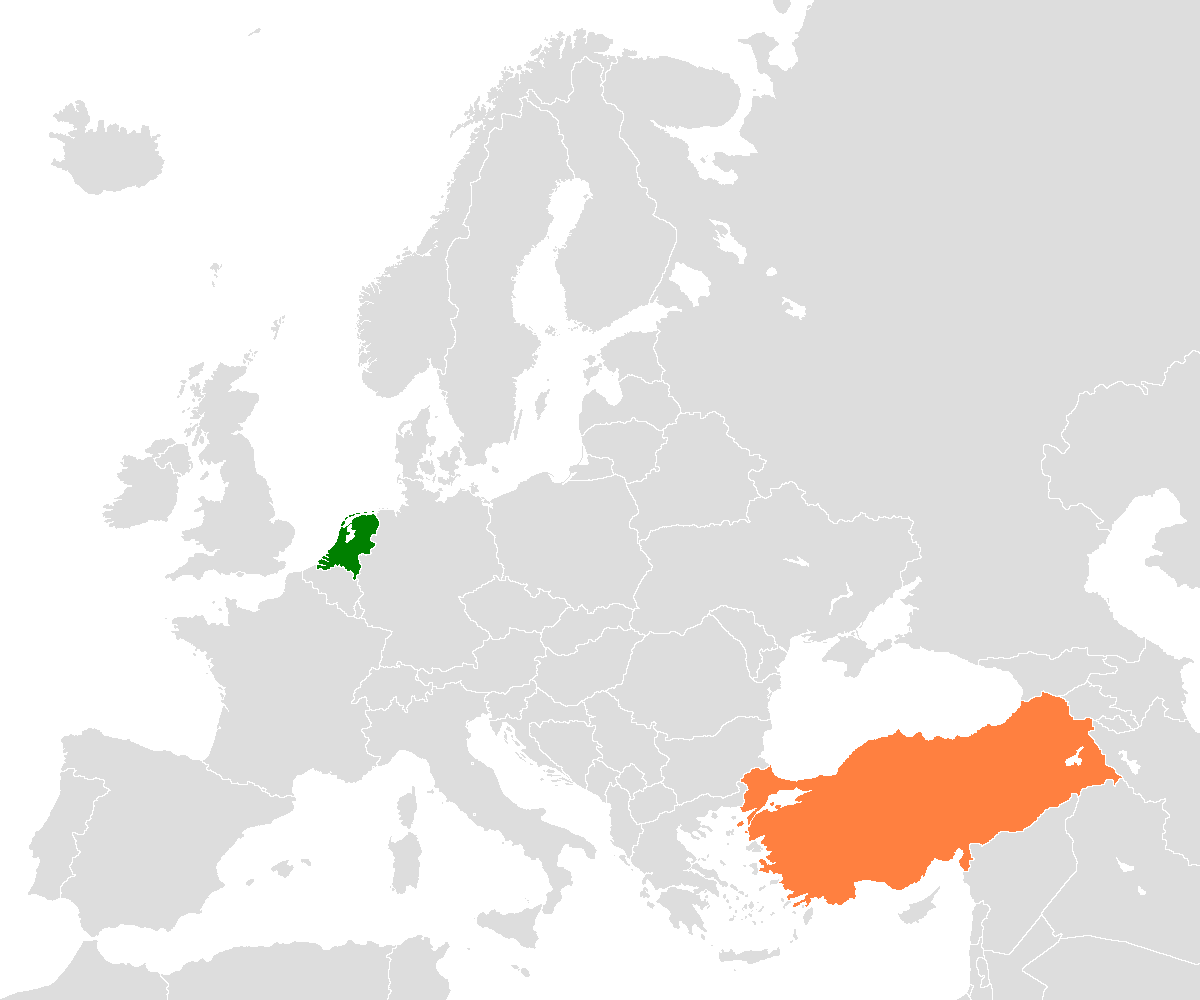
- Netherlands: Turkey

In March 2017, the Netherlands and Turkey were involved in a diplomatic incident, triggered by Turkish efforts to hold political rallies on Dutch territory and subsequent travel restrictions placed by Dutch authorities on Turkish officials seeking to promote the campaign for a 'yes' vote in the upcoming Turkish constitutional referendum to Turkish citizens living in the Netherlands. Such foreign campaigning is illegal under Turkish law.

The Netherlands barred the aircraft of Turkish Minister of Foreign Affairs Mevlüt Çavuşoğlu from landing and expelled Turkish Minister of Family and Social Policies Fatma Betül Sayan Kaya from the country, when both tried to speak at rallies. In response, Turkey expelled the Dutch Ambassador from the country and Turkish President Recep Tayyip Erdoğan called the Dutch "fascists" and "remnants of Nazism" and accused the Netherlands of "massacring" Muslims in Srebrenica during the Bosnian War in 1995. Dutch Prime Minister Mark Rutte called Erdoğan's remarks "unacceptable" and a "vile falsification of history" and demanded an apology. Rutte also called for talks to resolve the impasse, adding that Turkey had crossed a diplomatic line.

== Background ==
The Turkish referendum held on 16 April 2017 concerned a series of constitutional amendments that, if approved, would transform the country from a parliamentary democracy into a presidential system, under which President Erdoğan would be able to stand in two more elections, theoretically allowing him to govern as a powerful head of state until 2029. Critics of the proposed changes have expressed their fears of increased authoritarianism, whereas supporters claim the new system would make the Turkish state stronger and safer.

In the 'Yes' campaign's attempt to persuade Europe's Turkish diaspora (many of whom still hold Turkish citizenship and thus are allowed to vote on the referendum) several high-ranking Turkish government officials sought to campaign in European cities with large Turkish populations. This included the Dutch city of Rotterdam, which contains a large portion of the 400,000 people of Turkish origin living in the Netherlands. The Turkish plans to campaign in European cities met a mixed reception in many European states, including the Netherlands.

Overseas election campaigning, even in diplomatic missions, is illegal under Turkish law; yet most political parties in Turkey, including the ruling AKP, have flouted this law.

The Turkish referendum came at a time when the Netherlands, too, was scheduled for its general election, which was held on 15 March 2017.

== Escalation ==
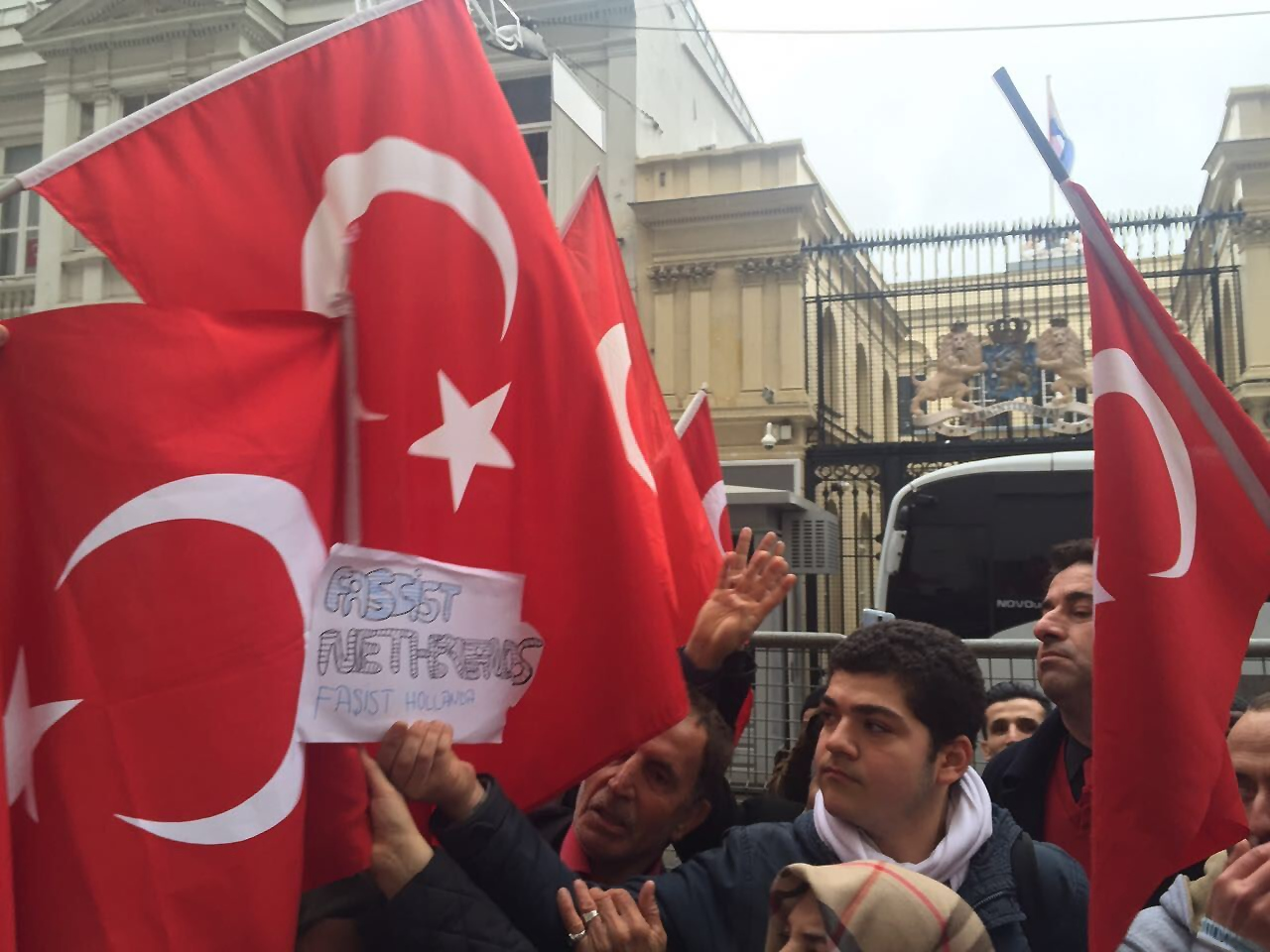
Protesters at the Consulate General of the Netherlands in Istanbul

On 3 March 2017, Dutch Prime Minister Mark Rutte got confirmation from the Turkish authorities that a campaign rally was planned on Dutch territory, on 11 March. That day he announced on his Facebook page that the Dutch authorities would not cooperate. On 6 March, the Dutch Ministry of Foreign Affairs received diplomatic mail requesting the admission of the Turkish Minister of Foreign Affairs Mevlüt Çavuşoğlu with the intention of attending a campaign meeting. The same day, the Dutch foreign minister Bert Koenders replied in a note verbale that such a visit would not be allowed. This led to a series of telephonic contacts between Koenders and Çavuşoğlu, as well as between Rutte and the Turkish prime minister Binali Yıldırım. According to Çavuşoğlu, the Dutch government told him that it objected to a visit because it feared that it would lead to an electoral victory of the anti-Islamic Party for Freedom. The Dutch government has denied that such a motive was ever communicated to Çavuşoğlu. Dutch diplomatic sources have indicated that Çavuşoğlu offered Koenders to postpone a visit to a date after the Dutch elections on 15 March, e.g. to 18 March, but that this option was refused by Koenders who wanted to avoid any suggestion of a connection between the two events, fearing it might give the impression that the Dutch government deliberately escalated the situation. As an alternative for a ministerial visit to a mass gathering, the Dutch authorities offered to allow the visit of Turkish ex-parliamentarians, or Çavuşoğlu visiting some closed session. When no consensus was reached, the Dutch made a final offer on 10 March: Çavuşoğlu would be allowed access to the Turkish embassy in The Hague. This was accepted by the Turks. Then the Dutch demanded that no more than fifty people were invited to the meeting and the session would not be made public beforehand. While Turkey considered this condition, a third one was made in the evening: the names of those invited would have to be disclosed beforehand to the Dutch authorities. On 11 March 03:00, it was added that if Turkey would not accept this offer, landing rights might be refused. Turkey considered this to be an unacceptable infringement on its sovereignty and a deliberate attempt by the Dutch to sabotage the visit. Koenders told the Dutch press that the Netherlands would not facilitate a planned visit by Çavuşoğlu to Rotterdam on 11 March, meaning that he would not meet with Çavuşoğlu in any official capacity and that the Dutch state would not provide support in any way during his planned visit. Koenders cited risks to public order and security for the decision, and further stated that, although the Dutch government did not approve of the planned visit, he would not infringe upon the constitutional right of freedom of assembly. Çavuşoğlu was very dismayed by what he saw as a Dutch ultimatum. He publicly requested "all Turkish citizens in the Netherlands" to come to the Turkish consulate in Rotterdam on 11 March. In an interview with CNN Türk around 09:00 he claimed to have been threatened by the Netherlands and announced "heavy sanctions" if his visit was prevented. Koenders watched the CNN programme; when he heard the remarks by Çavuşoğlu, he said "This is the signal" and immediately phoned Rutte. On 11 March, around 10:00, Rutte denied Çavuşoğlu's government plane the right to land on Dutch soil.

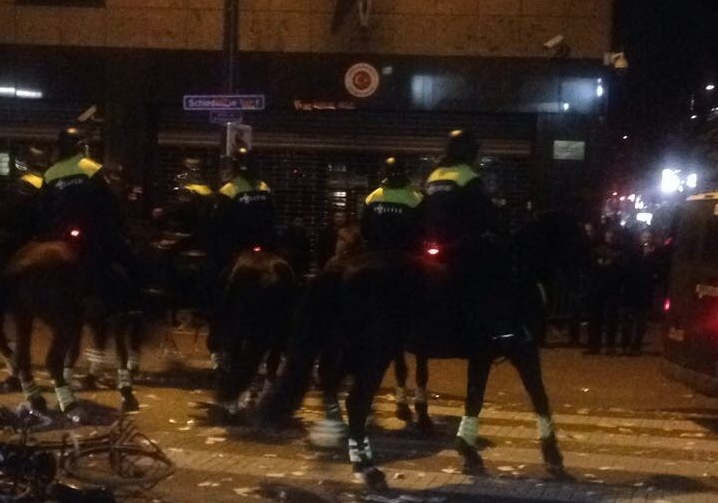
Mounted police in front of the Turkish consulate, Rotterdam

Meanwhile, Geert Wilders, the leader of the anti-Islamic Party for Freedom, had on 8 March demonstrated against the visit in front of the Turkish embassy in The Hague, heading a small group of party candidates. Together with member of parliament Sietse Fritsma, he held a banner with the words Blijf Weg! Dit is ons land ("Stay Away! This is our country"). On 11 March, Wilders too became aware of Çavuşoğlu's remarks; on 11:20 he sent a tweet to his many Twitter followers to re-tweet to Rutte: "don't let the Turkish minister into the country; do NOT let him land here". Later that day, Wilders in an interview with Al Jazeera claimed it was pressure from his party that convinced Rutte not to grant landing rights.

At the time, the Turkish Minister of Family and Social Policies, Fatma Betül Sayan Kaya, was touring Germany. A visit to the Dutch town of Hengelo, close to the German border, had already been scheduled. On 11 March, the Dutch General Intelligence and Security Service received information that Kaya would try to reach Rotterdam by car. She could freely cross the border because of the Schengen Agreement. A crisis centre was established on the twenty-third floor of the Rotterdam World Port Center to coordinate police actions. Earlier, the Turkish consul in Rotterdam had indicated to the Mayor of Rotterdam, Ahmed Aboutaleb, that there were no plans for such a visit. It now proved impossible to contact the consul, which gave Aboutaleb the conviction that the consul knew of Kaya's attempt. A motorcade was intercepted but the car with the minister managed to drive away. It reached a small yard at the rear of the Turkish consulate. The Dutch police stopped Betül Sayan Kaya's entourage just metres from the Turkish consulate building. About twenty police officers, forming a special forces unit, the Dienst Speciale Interventies, masked and equipped with body armour and automatic weapons, arrested ten members of Kaya's bodyguard, on suspicion of illegally carrying firearms. A German source had indicated they had obtained a German weapons permit. No arms were discovered. Two other men were also arrested, who later proved to be the Deventer Turkish consul and the chargé d'affaires of the Turkish embassy. They in principle enjoyed diplomatic immunity. The twelve arrested men were detained for two hours and their passports were seized. A stand-off ensued for several hours in which the Turkish minister refused to leave the car. Just after midnight, a special heavy tow truck, a lift flatbed, was driven into the yard and prepared to vertically hoist the 3.5 tonne car onto the flatbed, with the minister still in it, to transport her back to Germany. The minister now left the car and demanded entrance to the consulate invoking the Vienna Convention on Diplomatic Relations. The Dutch police had orders to arrest the minister if necessary. Ultimately, she gave in to the police demands to leave the country. At the time, many news sources assumed that she had been declared persona non grata. She was, loudly protesting, taken to another car, a black armoured Mercedes, by masked Dutch police officers who accompanied her to a police station at Nijmegen near the Dutch–German border. Her passport was seized. She was not allowed to leave the station for one and a half hours, while being reunited with the ten bodyguards. She returned to Germany under German escort. Sporadic rioting occurred among the about a thousand pro-Erdoğan protesters who had come to the Turkish consulate. They were met by Dutch riot police, who arrested twelve people for violent assault and not following police instructions. Kaya's passport was returned on 12 March, 18:00, to the Turkish consul. In April 2017, Kaya's lawyer said they would file a complaint against the Dutch government at court claiming that her expulsion from the Netherlands was illegal because she was not given a written statement of the reasons for the expulsion. However, on 2 May the case was dropped when it transpired that Kaya had never been formally declared persona non grata and that from a judicial point of view she had left the Netherlands voluntarily.

The Dutch actions prompted President Erdoğan to characterise the Dutch as "fascists" and "remnants of Nazism" and to accuse the Netherlands of mass murder in Srebrenica, which resulted in a hardening of positions on both sides. Rutte called Erdoğan's remarks "unacceptable" and a "vile falsification of history", and demanded an apology.

Rotterdam councillor Turan Yazır, a Dutch-Turkish citizen and supporter of Fethullah Gülen, was granted leave of absence after receiving threats and having his details published by the Daily Sabah newspaper, which also accused him of working with Geert Wilders.

== Reactions ==
=== Dutch reaction ===
- Prime Minister Rutte called the Turkish government's stance bizarre and unacceptable and called for talks to resolve the impasse, adding that Turkey had crossed a diplomatic line. "This has never happened before; a country saying someone is not welcome and then them coming regardless."
- A nationwide poll showed that 86% of the Dutch population supported the Dutch government's actions, with 10% condemning them; 91% of the Dutch population blamed the Turkish government for the incident's escalation.

=== Turkish reaction ===
- Turkish President Recep Tayyip Erdoğan said the Netherlands was acting like a "banana republic" and should face sanctions.
- The Turkish Prime Minister Binali Yıldırım said there would be "strong countermeasures" for the Netherlands. The residences of the Dutch ambassador, chargé d'affaires and consul general in Ankara were sealed off and the ambassador (who was on leave) was not allowed to return to Turkey.
- Protesters in cities of Turkey including Kocaeli, were seen squeezing and sticking knives into oranges (a prominent symbol of the Dutch royal family; the orange color is also associated with the Netherlands). Some protesters also burnt the flags of France since they assumed French President François Hollande was the President of Holland (Netherlands). Similarly, some Erdoğan supporters intended to call the Rotterdam police department and force the operators to listen to religious and nationalistic Turkish songs. However, they mistakenly called the police department of the town of Rotterdam in New York State, United States. A man replaced the Dutch flag of the Dutch Consulate General in Istanbul with a Turkish one with some protesters making signs of the ultra-nationalist Grey Wolves and shouting "Allahu akbar", "Racist Holland", and "Damn Holland".
- On 13 March, Turkish Deputy Prime Minister Numan Kurtulmuş announced that high-level diplomatic relations were suspended and barred the Dutch ambassador (who was out of the country during the incident) from returning to Turkey. In addition president Erdoğan announced the two ministers involved would file a complaint against the Netherlands with the European Court of Human Rights.
- On 14 March, Erdoğan accused the Netherlands of mass murder in Srebrenica. Also, he called on Turks, Muslims and foreigners living in Germany and the Netherlands not to vote for parties that espouse anti-Turkish policies.
- On 15 March, President Erdoğan urged the city of Istanbul to cut their (nonexistent) sister city agreement with Rotterdam. Istanbul Metropolitan Municipality city council has terminated Istanbul's twin city agreement with Rotterdam, on March, 15.
- On 15 March, Turkey's red meat association has ordered a consignment of prize Dutch cattle to be sent back to the Netherlands, saying it no longer wants to farm the cows due to the diplomatic crisis between the countries.
- Responding to Dutch election results, Turkish foreign minister Çavuşoğlu stated to consider Mark Rutte's party fascist like Wilders's PVV and predicted a holy war would erupt in Europe.
- Turkish hackers have hacked a number of Twitter accounts following the diplomatic row with Germany and the Netherlands over a ban on Turkish ministers entering the country.
- On 17 March, President Recep Tayyip Erdoğan, in a campaign speech at the town of Eskişehir, called CHP party opponents of the constitutional change "the Dutch within us". In the same speech Erdoğan called for the Turkish Diaspora in the European Union to have more children, saying "Make not three, but five children. Because you are the future of Europe. That will be the best response to the injustices against you."
- On the same day (17 March), Turkish interior minister Süleyman Soylu threatened to send 15,000 refugees to the European Union every month while Turkish foreign minister Mevlüt Çavuşoğlu has also threatened to cancel the March 2016 EU-Turkey migrant deal.
- On 22 March 2017, Erdoğan said that Europeans would not be able to walk safely on the streets if they kept up their current attitude toward Turkey. "If Europe continues this way, no European in any part of the world can walk safely on the streets. Europe will be damaged by this. We, as Turkey, call on Europe to respect human rights and democracy," he said.
- On 23 March 2017, Erdoğan said that he would call the European countries fascists as long as they continue to call him a dictator. Also, he clarified his “Nazi” remarks for the Netherlands and Germany, saying that he uttered those words within the context of their definition.

=== International reaction ===
==== International organisations ====
- Amnesty International – The organisation said that no fundamental human rights were violated by the police actions in Rotterdam.
- Council of Europe – Secretary General Thorbjørn Jagland called on the two countries to avoid further escalation of tensions and to return to dialogue.
- EU – On 13 March, the European Commission urged Turkey to "moderate its tone" in order to avoid further escalation of the incident. It added that Turkish insults towards the Netherlands, accusing them of being Nazis or fascists, is a mode of rhetoric which has no place in Europe. On 15 March, the President of the European Council Donald Tusk said in a speech in the European Parliament that Turkey's comments were "completely detached from reality". Tusk included a statement in Dutch saying: "Nederland is Europa en Europa is Nederland ... We zijn allemaal solidair met Nederland" ("The Netherlands are Europe and Europe is the Netherlands ... We are all in solidarity with the Netherlands"). President of the European Commission Jean-Claude Juncker said that Erdoğan's Nazi comments scandalized him and they will never accept a comparison between the Nazis and the governments currently in power and that it moves Turkey further away from the EU. EU High Representative for Foreign Affairs and Security Policy Federica Mogherini and Vice-President of the European Commission and European Commissioner for European Neighbourhood Policy and Enlargement Negotiations Johannes Hahn called on Turkey to engage in dialogue with EU member states as soon as possible and to end tensions. While EU member states and the EU promised full support and solidarity to the Netherlands, full support and solidarity were not promised to Turkey.
- NATO – NATO called for calm and for both sides to de-escalate the situation.

==== Governments ====
- Austria – Chancellor Christian Kern (6 days before the diplomatic crisis) called on EU member states to ban Turkish politicians from participating in referendum campaigns. Foreign Minister Sebastian Kurz said that Turkey was not welcome to hold rallies in Austria, stating that doing so could hinder integration and increase friction between Austrians and Turkish immigrants.
- Denmark – Prime Minister Lars Løkke Rasmussen expressed his concern about the political developments in Turkey, and announced his intention to postpone the visit of the Turkish Prime Minister Binali Yıldırım to Denmark.
- Finland – then-Finnish Prime Minister and Chairman of the Foreign Affairs Committee of the Finnish Parliament Matti Vanhanen announced that they will not allow Turkish ministers to conduct referendum campaigns in Finland.
- France – Foreign Minister Jean-Marc Ayrault called Erdoğan's comments "unacceptable" and for Turkey to abide by the European Convention on Human Rights.
- Germany – Chancellor Angela Merkel stated that she was not opposed to Turkish ministers holding rallies in Germany, providing that they had previously been announced. However, Interior Minister Thomas de Maizière said that Turkey had no business to campaign in Germany. Merkel defended the Netherlands and rejected Erdoğan's accusations towards the Netherlands as "completely unacceptable comments". She further stated that "the Netherlands could count on her full support and solidarity".

On 20 March, Chancellor Merkel told President Erdoğan that his comparing German officials to Nazis must stop. She also said that permission that had been granted for rallies to be held in Germany might be rescinded. Foreign Minister Sigmar Gabriel said that he had let his Turkish counterpart know that "a line had been crossed".

- United States – State Department spokesman Mark Toner called on both sides to avoid escalatory rhetoric.

== Later developments ==
The 2017 Dutch–Turkish diplomatic incident happened less than a week before the Dutch election; it was speculated that this benefited the Prime Minister Mark Rutte's party (VVD), as Rutte's response to the incident was well received. The VVD would see a surge in support in the polls. While Geert Wilders party (PVV) saw a decrease in support.

Mark Rutte's party (VVD) would later win in the elections.

On 5 February 2018, the Dutch Foreign Ministry announced that it was formally withdrawing its ambassador from Turkey and that it would not accept any new ambassador appointed by the Turkish government. The ministry added that on-going talks aimed at resolving the dispute had come to a halt, and that neither of the parties involved had agreed to normalize diplomatic ties. While the tension between the two countries still continues, on 22 February 2018, the Dutch House of Representatives unanimously adopted the bill recognizing the Armenian genocide. Turkey reacted harshly to this decision. The Netherlands and Turkey normalized the relations and appointed ambassadors in 2018.

== See also ==
- Netherlands–Turkey relations
- 2017 Dutch general election
- 2017 Turkish constitutional referendum
- Turks in the Netherlands
- Afrikaanderwijk riots
