= Derya Yanık =

Turkish lawyer and politician

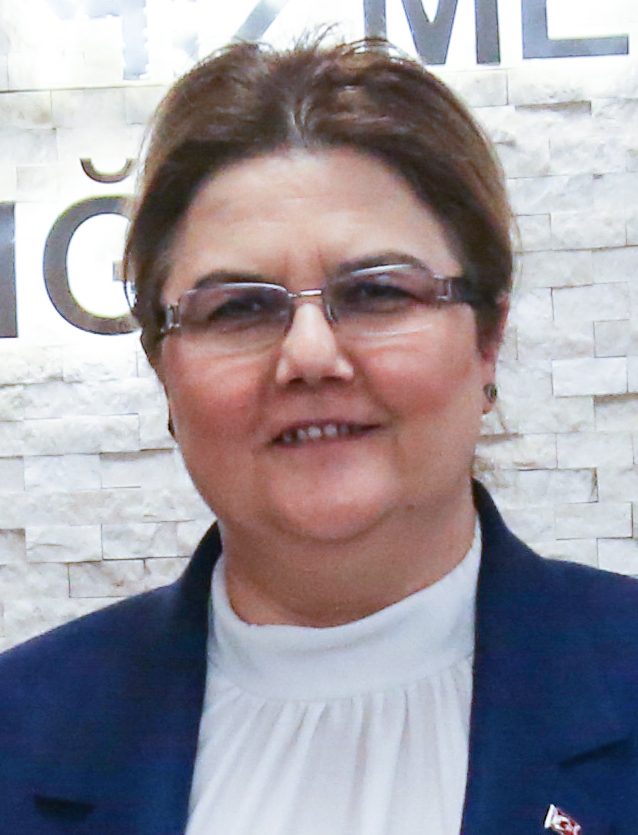

Minister of Family and Social Services
- In office 21 April 2021 – 4 June 2023
- President: Recep Tayyip Erdoğan
- Preceded by: Zehra Zümrüt Selçuk
- Succeeded by: Mahinur Özdemir

Personal details
- Born: 30 May 1972 (age 54) Osmaniye, Turkey
- Party: Justice and Development Party
- Education: Istanbul University

Derya Yanık (born 30 May 1972) is a Turkish politician and lawyer. She served as the Turkish Minister of Family and Social Services from 2021 to 2023.

== Career ==
She graduated from Istanbul University in the Faculty of Law in 1995 with a BA. Between 2004 and 2014, she was the first woman to preside over the Municipal Council of Istanbul, and in 2006 she acted as the Deputy Mayor of Istanbul while Kadir Topbaş visited London.

Yanık is a member of the Board of Directors of the Foundation for Women and Democracy, and a member of the Justice and Development Party's Central Decision and Executive Board.

In the 2023 Turkish parliamentary election, she was elected to the Grand National Assembly of Turkey in Osmaniye from the Justice and Development Party.

Political offices
Preceded by Zehra Zümrüt Selçuk	Minister of Family and Social Services; 21 April 2021–4 June 2023	Succeeded by Mahinur Özdemir
