= Mahinur Özdemir Göktaş =

Turkish-Belgian politician (born 1982)

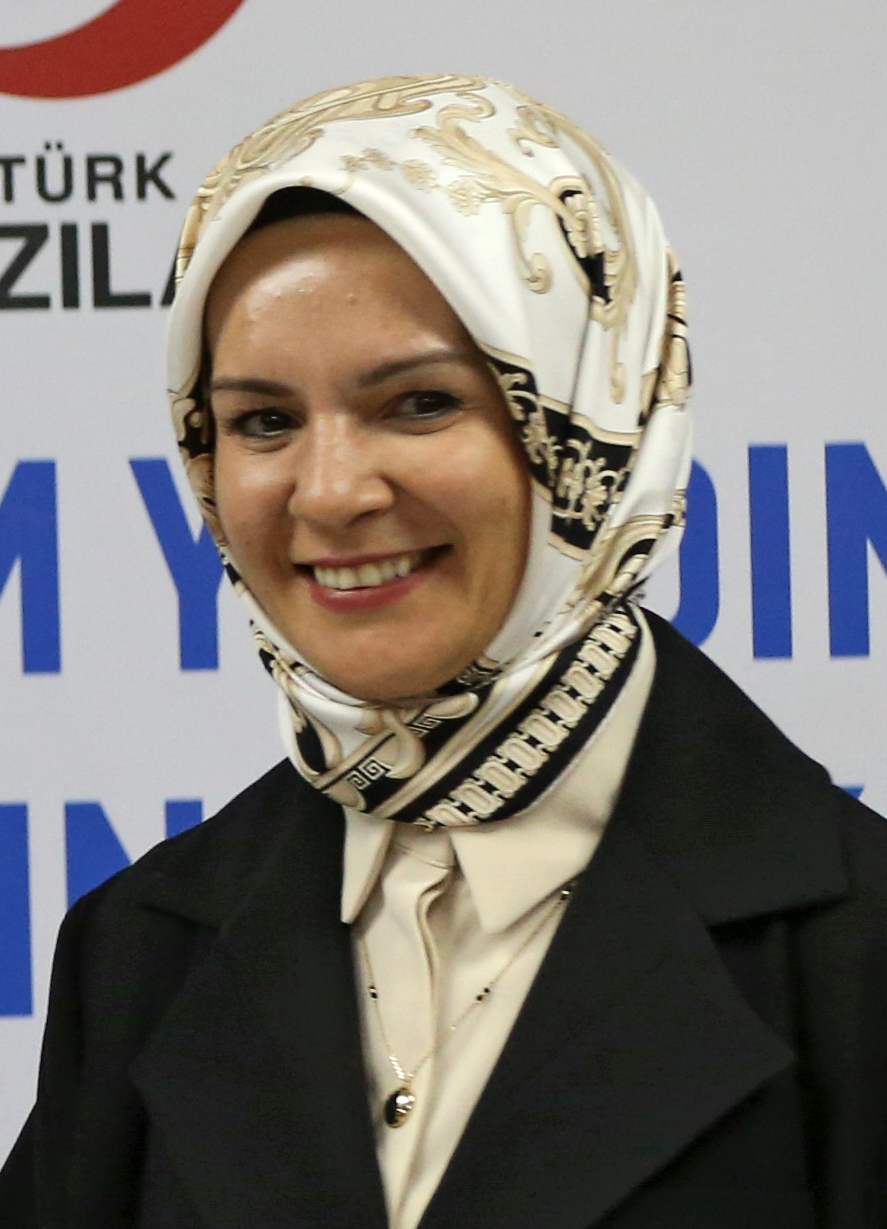
- Göktaş in 2023

Minister of Family and Social Services
- Incumbent
- Assumed office 4 June 2023
- President: Recep Tayyip Erdoğan
- Preceded by: Derya Yanık

Ambassador of Turkey to Algeria
- In office 1 January 2020 – 3 June 2023
- Preceded by: Mehmet Poroy
- Succeeded by: Mücahit Küçükyılmaz

Member of the Parliament of Brussels
- In office 23 June 2009 – 26 May 2019

Personal details
- Born: Mahinur Özdemir; 7 November 1982 (age 43) Schaerbeek, Brussels, Belgium
- Citizenship: Belgium; Turkey
- Party: Justice and Development Party (2023–present)
- Other political affiliations: Humanist Democratic Centre (2009–2015); Independent (2015–2023)
- Spouse: Rahmi Göktaş
- Children: 2
- Education: Université libre de Bruxelles (BS, MA)
- Occupation: Politician, diplomat

Mahinur Özdemir Göktaş (born 7 November 1982) is a Turkish-Belgian politician, diplomat and was Turkey's Ambassador to Algeria between 2020 and 2023 and currently Minister of Family and Social Services since 2023. She is the youngest and first female member of parliament to wear the hijab. She was expelled from the Belgian Humanist Democratic Centre party (cdH) for denying the Armenian genocide in 2015.

== Biography ==
She can speak French, Dutch, English, Turkish Turkish and Spanish. At first she wanted to study law, but as she reckoned that she wouldn't be able to litigate in court while wearing a hijab, she changed her mind. She holds a degree in political science with a focus on public administration from the Université libre de Bruxelles. She is also an active member of many NGOs in Schaerbeek and the founder of a student organization. In 2006, she was elected as municipal councilor in the municipality of Schaerbeek. She joined the Christian Democratic Party in Brussels in 2009 and was elected as member of the Brussels Regional Parliament on 7 June 2009. She was the first woman to wear the headscarf in a Belgian parliamentary assembly. In July 2018, she announced she wouldn't run in the local elections in October 2018.

After the re-election of President Recep Tayyip Erdoğan in June 2023 she was appointed Minister for Family and Social Services.

== Political positions ==
=== Armenian Genocide denial ===
Ozdemir was expelled from her party, the Humanist Democratic Centre on 29 May 2015 because she denied the Armenian Genocide committed by the Ottoman Empire was a genocide. She also didn't attend a moment of silence in memory of the victims of the Armenian genocide in parliament, defending herself that there were no court rulings that undermined the Armenian claims. Ozdemir claimed this to be freedom of speech. This is against the party’s deontological bylaws and CDH Chairman Benoit Lutgen had formerly stated that all genocide deniers within the party would be expelled. In protest of this decision, two other members of the cdH, one of them the brother of Mahinur, also left the party, alleging the party underwent a shift to the right. Ozdemir immediately received support from the Justice and Development (AKP) Party office in Brussels. There also was a demonstration in support of Ozdemir by the AKP-affiliated UEDT, beginning at the headquarters of her former party and ending at the Turkish embassy.

Political offices
Preceded by Derya Yanık	Minister of Family and Social Services; 4 June 2023–Present	Succeeded by Incumbent
