= Ayşenur İslam =

Turkish politician (born 1958)

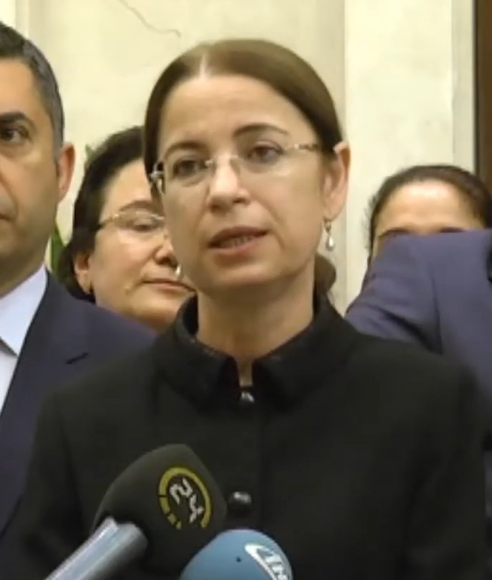
- Ayşenur islam.png

Minister of Family and Social Policy
- In office 25 December 2013 – 28 August 2015
- Prime Minister: Recep Tayyip Erdoğan; Ahmet Davutoğlu
- Preceded by: Fatma Şahin
- Succeeded by: Ayşen Gürcan

Member of the Grand National Assembly
- In office 28 June 2011 – 1 November 2015
- Constituency: Sakarya (2011, June 2015)

Personal details
- Born: Ayşenur Külahlıoğlu; 16 January 1958 (age 68) Üsküdar, Istanbul, Turkey
- Party: Justice and Development Party (AKP)
- Spouse: Bahadır İslam
- Children: 1
- Education: Chemical engineering; Ankara University; Gazi University
- Occupation: Politician, university lecturer

Ayşenur İslam (born Külahlıoğlu; born 16 January 1958) is a Turkish university lecturer and politician. On 25 December 2013, she was appointed as the Minister of Family and Social Policy in the third cabinet of Erdoğan and served until 28 August 2015.

== Personal life ==
She was born to Mehmet İslam and his wife Cahide on 16 January 1958 in Üsküdar, Istanbul. She studied Turkish literature at Ankara University and earned a master's degree at the same university. She received her PhD from Gazi University.

In 2005, she became an associate professor. İslam worked as a lecturer at Ankara University, Kırıkkale University, and Başkent University. She is author of ten books and around 40 publications.

She is the daughter-in-law of Nadir Latif İslam, a former deputy from the Justice Party (AP), who is also the father-in-law of Merve Kavakçı. Her husband Bahadır İslam is a physician, who volunteers in relief organizations. He was on board the MV Mavi Marmara, which was involved in the 2010 Gaza flotilla raid.

İslam has one child.

== Political career ==
She entered politics through the ruling Justice and Development Party (AKP), and was elected into the Grand National Assembly of Turkey in the 2011 general election as an MP from Sakarya Province.

On 26 December 2013, she assumed office as the Minister of Family and Social Policy, succeeding Fatma Şahin during Erdoğan's cabinet reshuffle with ten new names that was announced the day before, on 25 December, following the 2013 corruption scandal in Turkey.

It was reported that President Abdullah Gül played also a role for her entry into the cabinet. During her civil servant time, she had worked together with the President's secretary general Mustafa İsen. She is a capacity in social policies.

== See also ==
- Women in Turkish politics

Political offices
Preceded by Fatma Şahin	Minister of Family and Social Policy; 26 December 2013 – 28 August 2015	Succeeded by Ayşen Gürcan
