= Ayşen Gürcan =

Turkish politician (born 1963)

Minister of Family and Social Policy
- In office 28 August 2015 – 17 November 2015
- Prime Minister: Ahmet Davutoğlu
- Preceded by: Ayşenur İslam
- Succeeded by: Sema Ramazanoğlu

Personal details
- Born: 1963 (age 62–63) Burdur, Turkey
- Party: Justice and Development Party
- Education: Anadolu University
- Occupation: Academic, civil servant
- Cabinet: 63rd

Ayşen Gürcan (born 1963) is a Turkish academic and bureaucrat who served as the Minister of Family and Social Policy in the interim election government formed by Prime Minister Ahmet Davutoğlu from 28 August to 17 November 2015. She is the first government minister in Turkey to wear a headscarf.

A member of the Justice and Development Party, she was elected to the Grand National Assembly of Turkey in the 2023 parliamentary election from Eskişehir.

== Early life and career ==
Ayşen Gürcan was born in Burdur in 1963 and graduated from primary and middle school there.

=== Academic career ===
In 1986, Gürcan graduated from Anadolu University Faculty of Communication Sciences. Between 1987 and 1989, she worked for a master's degree on the topic of educational communication and planning. She obtained a doctorate on the topic of education technology. Between 1990 and 2005, she was a research member, teaching member and staff member at the Anadolu University Faculty of Education. She has published numerous works on educational sciences, teaching and learning, educational communication, techno-psychology and family education. She is currently a member of teaching staff at Istanbul Commerce University.

=== Bureaucratic career ===
Between 2006 and 2011, Gürcan served as the general manager for Family and Social Research at the Prime Ministry of Turkey. Between 2011 and 2013, she served as the Undersecretary to the Ministry of Family and Social Policy.

== Minister of Family and Social Policy ==
After the June 2015 general election resulted in a hung parliament, unsuccessful coalition negotiations raised speculation over whether President Recep Tayyip Erdoğan would call an early election in the event that AKP leader Ahmet Davutoğlu was unable to form a government within the given constitutional time of 45 days. As required by the 114th article of the Constitution of Turkey, the calling of a snap general election by the President necessitates the forming of an interim election government, in which all parties represented in Parliament are given a certain number of ministers according to how many MPs they have. If a party refused to send ministers to the interim cabinet, then independents must take their place.

Erdoğan called a new general election for November 2015 in late August, with Davutoğlu being tasked with the formation of the interim government. With the main opposition Republican People's Party (CHP) and the Nationalist Movement Party (MHP) refusing to send ministers to the cabinet, the 8 ministries that the two parties were entitled to were vacated for independents. As a result, Gürcan was appointed as the independent Minister of Family and Social Policy.

Gürcan became the only woman in the interim election cabinet and the first ever government minister in Turkey to wear a headscarf. The appointment was seen as significant due to the staunchly secular political traditions of Turkey, which until recently banned the use of the headscarf by MPs and civil servants. It was claimed that Davutoğlu had to phone her 8 times to invite her to become a Minister, since she was abroad while the interim government was being formed.

=== 'Börek' controversy ===
Amid several controversial tweets on her Twitter account, Gürcan claimed that if a Muslim family women did not know how to make börek [a form of pasty originating from Turkey], then that family would fall apart. The tweet attracted controversy for displaying an allegedly demeaning message for women's rights and independence in Turkey. When asked about the statement, Gürcan attracted even more criticism by claiming that she 'did not think' she had made such a claim and that her 'friends were investigating'. In a subsequent press statement when she was asked about what she was doing as the new Family and Social Policy Minister, she joked 'for now I'm making börek.' Her reply was hailed as a shutdown of the börek commotion by pro-government newspapers but were criticised as an attempt to brush off her old controversial comments by the pro-opposition media.

=== Polemic with the Undersecretary ===
In September 2015, it was reported that Gürcan had written a complaint about the Undersecretary to the Family and Social Policy Ministry, Nesrin Çelik, to the President of Turkey. The complaint, which allegedly arose from institutional disagreements between the two women, was eyed sceptically by several commentators since Çelik was well known to be close to President Recep Tayyip Erdoğan. In a reply to her complaint, Gürcan was told by the Presidency that she only had 2 months left in office and she should not interfere with such issues. Former Interior Minister Efkan Ala also came out in support of Çelik.

=== Political career after 2023 ===
Since her election to parliament in 2023, Gürcan has continued to serve as an AK party MP for Eskişehir. She chairs the Grand National Assembly's Nationals Education, Culture, Youth and Sport Committee (''Millî Eğitim, Kültür, Gençlik ve Spor Komisyonu''). She has also served as a chief advisor to the President of Turkey during the 11th and 12th presidential terms.

== Controversy ==
Gürcan's appointment as a minister was controversial due to her views on religious education, Islamic punishment and the Islamic State of Iraq and the Levant (ISIL) on her Twitter account. In 2014, she tweeted that education had no use if it did not contribute to religious or ethical wellbeing. In February 2015, she made numerous tweets in favour of the Islamic form of retributive justice, namely Qisas (eye for an eye). On numerous occasions and after the 2014 presidential election, she tweeted both support and admiration for AKP founder Recep Tayyip Erdoğan, resulting in her de facto 'independent' status in the interim election cabinet coming under scrutiny. In response to videos of beheadings and pictures documenting the brutality of the ISIL terrorist organisation in Iraq and Syria, Gürcan tweeted that no-one should take such footage seriously just 'because the West wants it'. After becoming a minister, Gürcan deleted her Twitter account.

== See also ==
- Women in Turkish politics
- Secularism in Turkey
