= Nimet Baş =

Turkish politician and lawyer

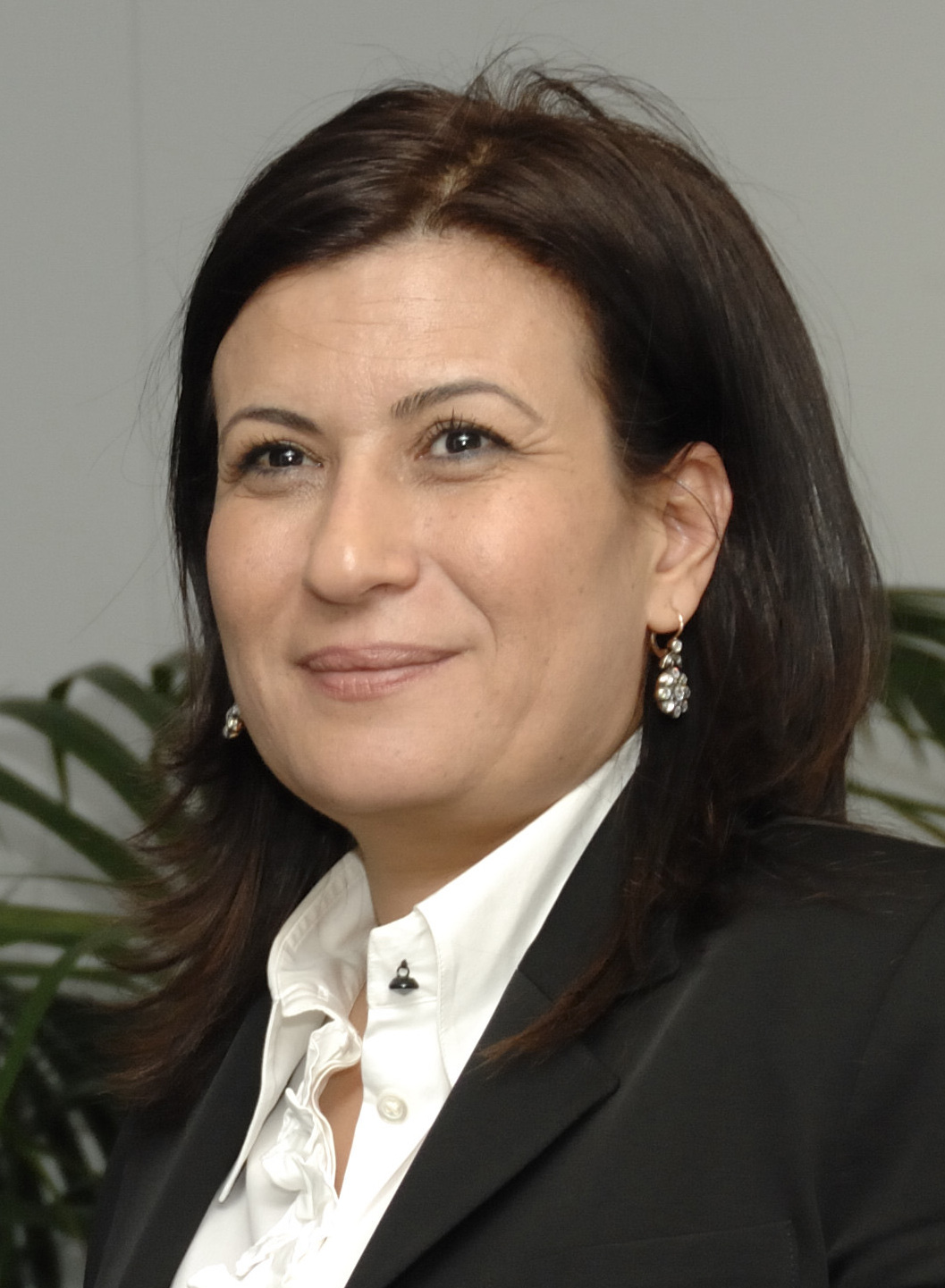

Minister of National Education
- In office 1 May 2009 – 6 July 2011
- Prime Minister: Recep Tayyip Erdoğan
- Preceded by: Hüseyin Çelik
- Succeeded by: Ömer Dinçer

Minister of State (Responsible for Women and Family Affairs)
- In office 2 June 2005 – 1 May 2009
- Prime Minister: Recep Tayyip Erdoğan
- Preceded by: Güldal Akşit
- Succeeded by: Selma Aliye Kavaf

Member of the Grand National Assembly
- In office 3 November 2002 – 7 June 2015
- Constituency: İstanbul (II) (2002, 2007, 2011)

Personal details
- Born: Nimet Baş; 2 March 1965 (age 61) Ayrancı, Karaman, Turkey
- Party: Justice and Development Party
- Spouse: Birol Çubukçu (divorced in 2011)
- Children: Çağrı Çubukçu
- Education: Istanbul University Faculty of Law
- Profession: Lawyer
- Cabinet: Erdoğan I Erdoğan II
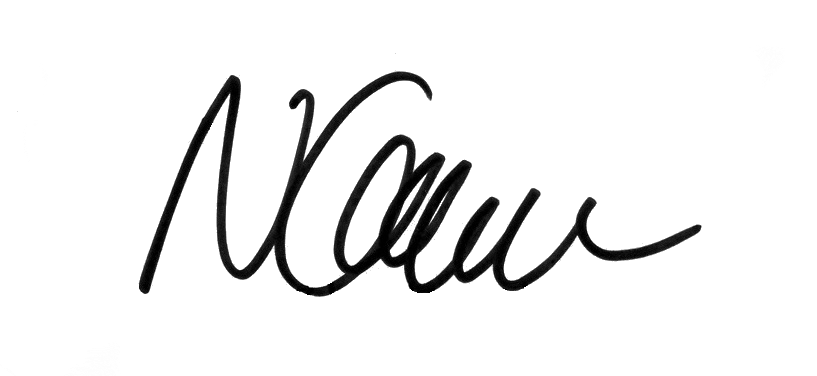
- Signature

Nimet Baş (previously Çubukçu) (born 2 March 1965) is a Turkish politician and lawyer. She has been a Member of Parliament from the Justice and Development Party since 2002. She was the Minister of State (2005–2009) and the Minister of National Education (2009–2011).

Baş was married to Birol Çubukçu. They divorced in 2011.

Political offices
Preceded by Güldal Akşit	Minister of State (Responsible for Women and Family Affairs); 2 June 2005–1 May 2009	Succeeded by Selma Aliye Kavaf
Preceded by Hüseyin Çelik	Minister of National Education; 1 May 2009–6 July 2011	Succeeded by Ömer Dinçer
