= Sema Ramazanoğlu =

Turkish politician (born 1959)

Sema Ramazanoğlu MP
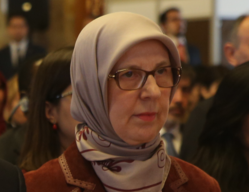

Minister of Family and Social Policy
- In office 24 November 2015 – 24 May 2016
- Prime Minister: Ahmet Davutoğlu
- Preceded by: Ayşen Gürcan
- Succeeded by: Fatma Betül Sayan Kaya

Member of the Grand National Assembly
- Incumbent
- Assumed office 1 November 2015
- Constituency: Denizli (Nov 2015)

Personal details
- Born: August 25, 1959 (age 66) Denizli, Turkey
- Citizenship: Turkish
- Party: Justice and Development Party
- Relatives: Selma Aliye Kavaf (sister)
- Education: Medicine
- Alma mater: Ankara University
- Cabinet: 64th

Sema Ramazanoğlu (born August 25, 1959) is a Turkish politician from the Justice and Development Party (AKP) who served as the Minister of Family and Social Policy in the third cabinet of Prime Minister Ahmet Davutoğlu from 24 November 2015 to 24 May 2016. She is the second cabinet minister of Turkey to wear a headscarf, after her predecessor as Family and Social Policy Minister Ayşen Gürcan. She serves as a Member of Parliament for the electoral district of Denizli since being elected in the snap general election on 1 November 2015.

Before becoming an MP and a cabinet minister, Ramazanoğlu served as an advisor to former Prime Minister Recep Tayyip Erdoğan from 2003 to 2009 in his capacity as AKP leader, having also been one of the founders of the AKP. She has served on the party's Central Executive Decision Board (MKYK). Her sister, Selma Aliye Kavaf, was also an AKP Member of Parliament from 2007 to 2011 and served as a Minister of State responsible for women and social policy between 2009 and 2011.

Ramazanoğlu faced large-scale criticism and calls for her resignation after it was revealed that 45 children staying at illegal dormitories owned by the Ensar Foundation, a pro-government religious education provider, had been raped by one of Ensar's teachers in Karaman. Ramazanoğlu was ridiculed for her defence of the Foundation, claiming that a 'one-time occurrence of such a situation should not be used to discredit Ensar's contributions to society.'

== Early life and career ==
Ramazanoğlu was born in 1959 in Denizli. She is married to Yıldırım Mehmet Ramazanoğlu, who is also a politician. She graduated from Ankara University as a surgeon and later travelled to Bern, Switzerland to specialise in the field of radiology. While working in universities and hospitals in Switzerland, she was active in both Turkish and Islamic societies living in Europe.

As a surgeon, Ramazanoğlu worked for over 20 years in numerous well known state hospitals and also participated in the administration of health-related foundations, such as the Women's Medics Association (KASAD-D). She was also a member of the Caspian Education, Culture and Solidarity Association. She participated in the establishment of and worked in a private clinic in Istanbul.

== Early political career ==
=== Women's rights ===
Ramazanoğlu was actively involved in the United Nations Convention on the Elimination of All Forms of Discrimination Against Women (CEDAW) foundation in New York City, helping with the presentation and providing guidance with the preparation of reports regarding Turkey. Besides the United Nations, Ramazanoğlu has also participated in several other international organisations dealing with women in the contemporary world. She has represented the AKP in numerous events regarding problems women face in Turkey and the Islamic World. She has also been a columnist for the 'Woman and Family' (“Kadın ve Aile”) magazine.

Ramazanoğlu is also a founding member of the Wise Women Advisory Board of the Islamic Development Bank in Jeddah, Saudi Arabia. She acted as an honorary advisor to the president of the board in projects concerning women and family policies, proposals and the planning and implementation of projects.

=== Justice and Development Party ===
In 2001, Ramazanoğlu participated in the establishment of the Justice and Development Party (AKP) and has been a member since. In 2003, she was elected to the Central Executive Decision Board (MKYK) and was re-elected in 2006, serving until 2009. She also served as an advisor to Prime Minister and party leader Recep Tayyip Erdoğan. Her sister Selma Aliye Kavaf was also a former AKP MP and a Minister of State.

== Minister of Family and Social Policy ==
Ramazanoğlu was fielded as a second preference candidate for the electoral district of Denizli by the AKP and was elected in the November 2015 general election as a Member of Parliament. Ramazanoğlu was appointed as the Minister of Family and Social Policy in the 64th government of Turkey by Prime Minister Ahmet Davutoğlu on 24 November 2015. She is the second minister in the history of Turkey to wear a headscarf, the first being her predecessor Ayşen Gürcan.

== See also ==
- Women in Turkey
- 26th Parliament of Turkey
