= Güler İleri =

Turkish politician

Minister of State
- In office November 21, 1991 – February 22, 1992
- Prime Minister: Süleyman Demirel
- Preceded by: İmren Aykut
- Succeeded by: Türkân Akyol

Personal details
- Born: 1948 (age 77–78) Zile, Tokat Province, Turkey
- Party: Social Democratic Populist Party (SHP)
- Children: 2
- Education: Ankara College of Pharmacy
- Occupation: Pharmacist, politician
- Profession: Pharmacist

Güler İleri (born 1948) is a Turkish female pharmacist, politician and former government minister.

Güler İleri was born into a wealthy and well-established family of Çuhadaroğlu in Zile, Tokat Province, Turkey in 1948. She completed the primary and middle education in her hometown. After graduating from the College of Pharmacy in Ankara in 1972, she returned to Zile. The same year, she established her own drugstore and entered politics. She is married and is mother of two.

İleri was a member of the 19th parliament representing Tokat from the Social Democratic Populist Party (SHP) (SHP). She served as the Minister of State of the portfolio "Women and Family" in the 49th government of Süleyman Demirel from November 21, 1991 until February 22, 1992. She had to resign from her post in the cabinet following an interpellation about the payment of the death notice for her father from the ministerial budget.

Political offices
Preceded by İmren Aykut	Minister of State of Turkey (Women and Family); November 21, 1991 – February 22, 1992	Succeeded by Türkân Akyol
