= Denizli (electoral district) =

Electoral district for the Grand National Assembly of Turkey

Coordinates: 37°50′N 34°45′E

- electoral district for the Grand National Assembly of Turkey
- Denizli shown within Turkey
- Province: Denizli
- Electorate: 795,283

Current electoral district
- Created: 1923
- Seats: 7
- Turnout at last election: 91.65% (2023)
- Representation
- AK Party: 3 / 7
- CHP: 3 / 7
- İYİ: 1 / 7

Denizli is an electoral district of the Grand National Assembly of Turkey. It elects seven members of parliament (deputies) to represent the province of the same name for a four-year term by the D'Hondt method, a party-list proportional representation system.

== Members ==
Population reviews of each electoral district are conducted before each general election, which can lead to certain districts being granted a smaller or greater number of parliamentary seats. Denizli's seats have remained stable since 1999, continuously electing seven MPs.

MPs for Denizli, 1999 onwards
Election	2002 (22nd Parliament)	2007 (23rd Parliament)	2011 (24th Parliament)	June 2015 (25th Parliament)	November 2015 (26th Parliament)	2018 (27th Parliament)	2023 (28th Parliament)
MP	Osman Nuri Filiz; AK Party	Mithat Ekici; AK Party	Nihat Zeybekçi; AK Party			Nilgün Ök; AK Party	Cahit Özkan; AK Party
MP	Ümmet Kandoğan; AK Party	Selma Aliye Kavaf; AK Party	Bilal Uçar; AK Party		Sema Ramazanoğlu; AK Party	Ahmet Yıldız; AK Party	Şahin Tin; AK Party
MP	Mehmet Yüksektepe; AK Party	Mehmet Yüksel; AK Party			Cahit Özkan; AK Party		Nilgün Ök; AK Party
MP	Mehmet Salih Erdoğan; AK Party		Nurcan Dalbudak; AK Party	Gülizar Biçer Karaca; CHP	Şahin Tin; AK Party		Gülizar Biçer Karaca; CHP
MP	Mustafa Gazalcı; CHP	Hasan Erçelebi; CHP	İlhan Cihaner; CHP	Kazım Arslan; CHP			Şeref Arpacı; CHP
MP	Mehmet Uğur Neşşar; CHP	Ali Riza Ertemür; CHP	Adnan Keskin; CHP	Melike Basmacı; CHP		Haşim Teoman Sancar; CHP	Sema Silkin Ün; CHP
MP	Veli Haşim Oral; CHP	Emin Haluk Ayhan; MHP				Gülizar Biçer Karaca; CHP	Yasin Öztürk; Good Party
MP	No seat					Yasin Öztürk; Good Party	No seat

== General elections ==
=== 2011 ===
2011 general election: Denizli
Party	Candidate	Votes	%	±%
AK Party	4 elected 0: 1. Nihat Zeybekçi ✓; 2. Mehmet Yüksel ✓; 3. Bilal Uçar ✓; 4. Nurcan Dalbuduk ✓; 5. Cahit Özkan ✗; 6. Halil Pekdemir ✗; 7. Ayhan Soyfidan ✗	279,091	46.62	▲3.60
CHP	2 elected 0: 1. Adnan Keskin ✓; 2. İlhan Cihangir ✓; 3. Melike Basmacı Kayhan ✗; 4. Adil Demir ✗; 5. Kazım Arslan ✗; 6. Huriye Çağlayan ✗; 7. Ali Kavak ✗	187,017	31.24	▲9.27
MHP	1 elected 0: 1. Emin Haluk Ayhan ✓; 2. Ali Keskin ✗; 3. Ümit Bahtiyar ✗; 4. Mehmet Ali Uzakgider ✗; 5. Muzaffer Keçelioğlu ✗; 6. Bekir Kaymakcı ✗; 7. Nilgün Aksu Şener ✗	101,408	16.94	▼0.79
DP	None elected: 1. İsmail Ağar ✗; 2. Osman Çandır ✗; 3. İsmail Hakkı Kavak ✗; 4. Aysel Çakmak ✗; 5. Ömer Kılıç ✗; 6. Turgay Urgun ✗; 7. İsmail Sağer ✗	5,877	0.98	▼7.77
Independent	None elected: Mustafa Güleç ✗ Kemal Beler ✗ Kazım Gürdal ✗	5,871	0.98	▲0.02
Büyük Birlik	None elected: 1. Mehmet Efe ✗; 2. Hüseyin Sarı ✗; 3. Süleyman Oruç ✗; 4. Fatma Karaca ✗; 5. Namık Selcuk ✗; 6. Bekir Giritoğlu ✗; 7. Halil İbrahim Yılmaz ✗	3,821	0.64	▲0.64
HAS Party	None elected: 1. Mehmet Uğur Tatar ✗; 2. Taner İzgi ✗; 3. Zeliha Güvenç ✗; 4. Ramazan Yurtsev ✗; 5. Ercan Koç ✗; 6. Salih Tekin ✗; 7. Süleyman Arslantürk ✗	3,162	0.53	▲0.53
SAADET	None elected: 1. Ali Rıza Alnıak ✗; 2. Bayram Ünnü ✗; 3. Ahmet Ergunt ✗; 4. Cağfer Akınlı ✗; 5. Haşim Ahmet Abdulbaki Buğra Bahadır Nebioğulları ✗; 6. Sait Arı ✗; 7. Kamil Selçuk ✗	2,868	0.48	▼0.52
HEPAR	None elected: 1. Rasim Etçioğlu ✗; 2. İlksen Koptur ✗; 3. Bünyamin Yıldız ✗; 4. Nazan Yılmaz ✗; 5. Selami Şevik ✗; 6. İdris Karadağ ✗; 7. Mukadder Duran ✗	2,561	0.43	▲0.43
DYP	None elected: 1. Serap Çetinkaya ✗; 2. Mustafa Ali Darıviranlı ✗; 3. Yalçın Ünal ✗; 4. Zehra Eraraç ✗; 5. Semra Taşkırmaz ✗; 6. Ali Gökcen ✗; 7. Ahmet Ali Arman ✗	1,773	0.30	▲0.30
DSP	None elected: 1. Hasan Erçelebi ✗; 2. Meral Er ✗; 3. İlhan Tufan ✗; 4. Sadık Köyoğlu ✗; 5. Kemal Açıkalın ✗; 6. Hilmi Bali ✗; 7. Mehmet Kamil Tarakcı ✗	1,753	0.29	N/A
Labour	None elected: 1. Mustafa Aday ✗; 2. Zübeyde Çataltepe ✗; 3. Nermin Şahin ✗; 4. Tahir Akçay ✗; 5. Müzait Akman ✗; 6. Yusuf Cemal Mutaf ✗; 7. Süleyman Tezel ✗	1,658	0.28	▲0.27
TKP	None elected: 1. Savaş Sarı ✗; 2. Bilal Doğan ✗; 3. Ali Çetin ✗; 4. Veli Fırtına ✗; 5. Özlem Tülü ✗; 6. Muharrem Kırkım ✗; 7. İsmail Gümüşsoy ✗	707	0.12	▼0.21
MP	None elected: 1. Hüsnü Çatal ✗; 2. Necati Varlıklı ✗; 3. Erol Yaka ✗; 4. Uğur Uzun ✗; 5. Zafer Kodal ✗; 6. Mehmet Bayrak ✗; 7. Şükrü Demir ✗	692	0.12	▲0.12
Liberal Democrat	None elected: 1. Lütfi Erol ✗; 2. Hakan Kaya ✗; 3. Kamil Keçelioğlu ✗; 4. Elmas Demiralp ✗; 5. Himmet Üyümaz ✗; 6. Ramazan Akşit ✗; 7. Mediha Tuna ✗	381	0.06	▲0.06
Nationalist Conservative	No candidates	0	0.00	0.00
Total votes		598,640	100.00	
Rejected ballots		15,991	2.46	▲0.14
Turnout		612,779	91.14	▲0.64
AK Party hold Majority		92,074	15.38	▼5.67

=== June 2015 ===
Abbr.	Party	Votes	%
AKP	Justice and Development Party	247,998	39.5%
CHP	Republican People's Party	220,526	35.2%
MHP	Nationalist Movement Party	115,016	18.3%
HDP	Peoples' Democratic Party	23,849	3.8%
SP	Felicity Party	8,809	1.4%
	Other	10,858	1.7%
Total		627,056	
Turnout		89.92	
source: YSK

=== November 2015 ===
Abbr.	Party	Votes	%
AKP	Justice and Development Party	289,081	45.5%
CHP	Republican People's Party	218,151	34.3%
MHP	Nationalist Movement Party	93,629	14.7%
HDP	Peoples' Democratic Party	16,917	2.7%
SP	Felicity Party	2,450	0.4%
	Other	15,465	2.4%
Total		635,693	
Turnout		90.12	
source: YSK

=== 2018 ===
Abbr.	Party	Votes	%
AKP	Justice and Development Party	263,997	39.8%
CHP	Republican People's Party	187,080	28.2%
IYI	Good Party	111,117	16.7%
MHP	Nationalist Movement Party	60,468	9.1%
HDP	Peoples' Democratic Party	24,029	3.6%
SP	Felicity Party	5,532	0.8%
	Other	11,773	1.8%
Total		663,996	
Turnout		91.28	
source: YSK

=== 2023 ===
Abbr.	Party	Votes	%
AKP	Justice and Development Party	249,278	33.98%
CHP	Republican People's Party	233,993	31.9%
IYI	Good Party	103,121	14.06%
MHP	Nationalist Movement Party	62.060	8.46%
YEŞİL SOL	Green Left Party	19,186	2.62%
ZAFER	Victory Party	18,741	2.56%
	Other	35,346	4.82%
Total		733,498	
Turnout		91.65	
source: YSK

== Presidential elections ==
=== 2014 ===
2014 presidential election: Denizli
Party	Candidate	Votes	%
Independent	Ekmeleddin İhsanoğlu	282,533	49.63
AK Party	Recep Tayyip Erdoğan	268,116	47.09
HDP	Selahattin Demirtaş	18,682	3.28
Total votes		569,331	100.00
Rejected ballots		13,136	2.26
Turnout		582,467	83.00
Registered electors		701,803	
Ekmeleddin İhsanoğlu win			

=== 2018 ===
2018 presidential election: Denizli
Party	Candidate	Votes	%
AKP	Recep Tayyip Erdoğan	317,608	47.82
CHP	Muharrem İnce	235,101	35.39
İYİ	Meral Akşener	91,808	13.82
HDP	Selahattin Demirtaş	14,243	2.14
SAADET	Temel Karamollaoğlu	3,645	0.54
Patriotic	Doğu Perinçek	1,731	0.26
Total votes		664,136	100.00
Rejected ballots		18,447	2.70
Turnout		682,583	91.27
Registered electors		747,897	
Recep Tayyip Erdoğan win			

=== 2023 ===
2023 presidential election: Denizli – First round
Party	Candidate	Votes	%
CHP	Kemal Kılıçdaroğlu	344,527	48.36
AK Party	Recep Tayyip Erdoğan	312,634	43.88
Ancestral Alliance	Sinan Oğan	50,509	7.09
Memleket	Muharrem İnce	4,738	0.67
Total votes		712,408	100.00
Rejected ballots		16,552	2.27
Turnout		728,960	91.73
Registered electors		794,714	
Kemal Kılıçdaroğlu win			

2023 presidential election: Denizli – Second round
Party	Candidate	Votes	%
AK Party	Recep Tayyip Erdoğan		
CHP	Kemal Kılıçdaroğlu		
Total votes			
Rejected ballots			
Turnout			
Registered electors			
win			
