= Fatma Betül Sayan Kaya =

Turkish politician (born 1981)

Fatma Betül Sayan Kaya MP
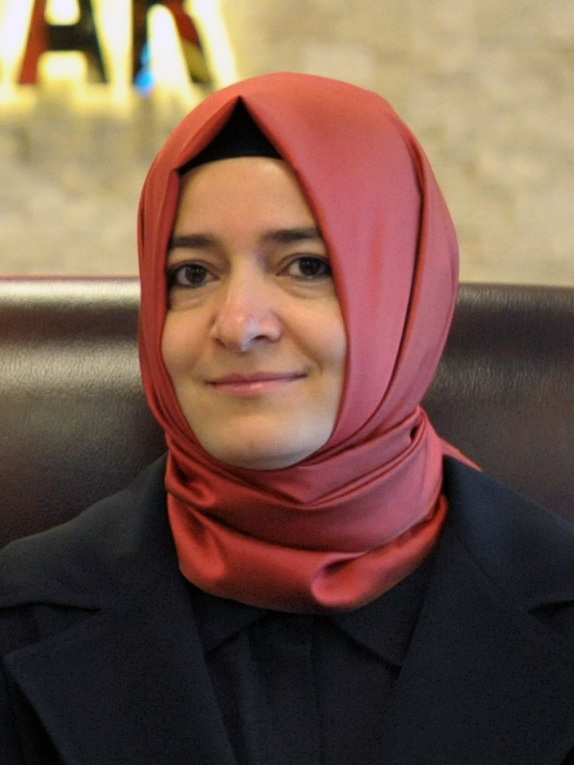

Minister of Family and Social Policy
- In office 24 May 2016 – 10 July 2018
- Prime Minister: Binali Yıldırım
- Preceded by: Sema Ramazanoğlu
- Succeeded by: Zehra Zümrüt Selçuk

Member of the Grand National Assembly
- Incumbent
- Assumed office 1 November 2015
- Constituency: Istanbul (II) (Nov 2015, 2018)

Deputy Chairwoman of the Justice and Development Party responsible for foreign affairs
- Incumbent
- Assumed office 25 November 2015
- Leader: Ahmet Davutoğlu; Binali Yıldırım
- Preceded by: Mevlüt Çavuşoğlu

Personal details
- Born: January 31, 1981 (age 45) Fatih, Istanbul, Turkey
- Party: Justice and Development Party (AKP)
- Spouse: İlyas Kaya
- Children: 2
- Education: Bilkent University (BSci); Istanbul University (MD)
- Cabinet: 65th

Fatma Betül Sayan Kaya (Turkish pronunciation: [fatˈma beˈtyɫ saˈjan kaˈja]; born January 31, 1981) is a Turkish politician who served as the Minister of Family and Social Policies between 2016 and 2018. In 2026 she resigned as vice-chair of the Justice and Development Party (AKP) responsible for foreign affairs amidst allegations of trade sharing allegations.

== Education ==
Fatma Betül Sayan graduated from Bilkent University department of computer engineering with high distinction. She completed her MD degree in Cerrahpaşa Medical School of Istanbul University. Between 2009 and 2012, she served as an advisor to Recep Tayyip Erdoğan.

== Career ==
In 2017 she was involved in a diplomatic row between the Netherlands and Turkey, during which she was denied from campaigning in the Netherlands for the 2017 Turkish constitutional referendum.

She served as the Minister of Family and Social Policies between 2016 and 2018, and was a Member of Parliament for Istanbul second electoral district from the AKP until May 2023.

=== 2026 investment investigation ===
On 27 September 2026, Sayan Kaya resigned as AKP deputy chairwoman amid opposition allegations that she sold roughly 1.3 billion Turkish Lira (~$27.5 million) in shares shortly before a sharp market decline on 16 September 2026. President Recep Tayyip Erdoğan accepted her resignation.

On 5 November 2026, Sayan Kaya was remanded in custody by an Istanbul criminal judgeship as part of an investigation into alleged irregularities involving stock market transactions and investment funds. Prosecutors had sought her detention on suspicion of violating Turkey's Capital Markets Law and membership of a criminal organization.

The investigation concerned transactions involving shares in Özata Denizcilik, a Turkish shipbuilding company. According to the prosecution, a report prepared by the Capital Markets Board indicated that Kaya may have possessed non-public information capable of influencing share prices or investors' decisions. Prosecutors also questioned the timing of her share sales on 16 September 2026, one day before a decision to liquidate the investment funds involved in the investigation. Kaya denied the allegations, maintaining that her investment decisions had not been influenced by privileged information or external guidance.

Her husband, İlyas Kaya, and former Capital Markets Board chairman İbrahim Ömer Gönül were also questioned as part of the investigation. Both were released subject to judicial control measures, including travel bans and regular reporting requirements.

On 9 November 2026, during questioning in connection with the financial investigation, she reportedly declared that she was a homemaker with monthly income of 500,000 Liras (about 10,000 USD).

Political offices
Preceded by Sema Ramazanoğlu	Minister of Family and Social Policy; 24 May 2016 – 10 July 2018	Succeeded by Zehra Zümrüt Selçuk
