= Maltepe Mosque =

Mosque in Ankara, Turkey

- Maltepe Camii
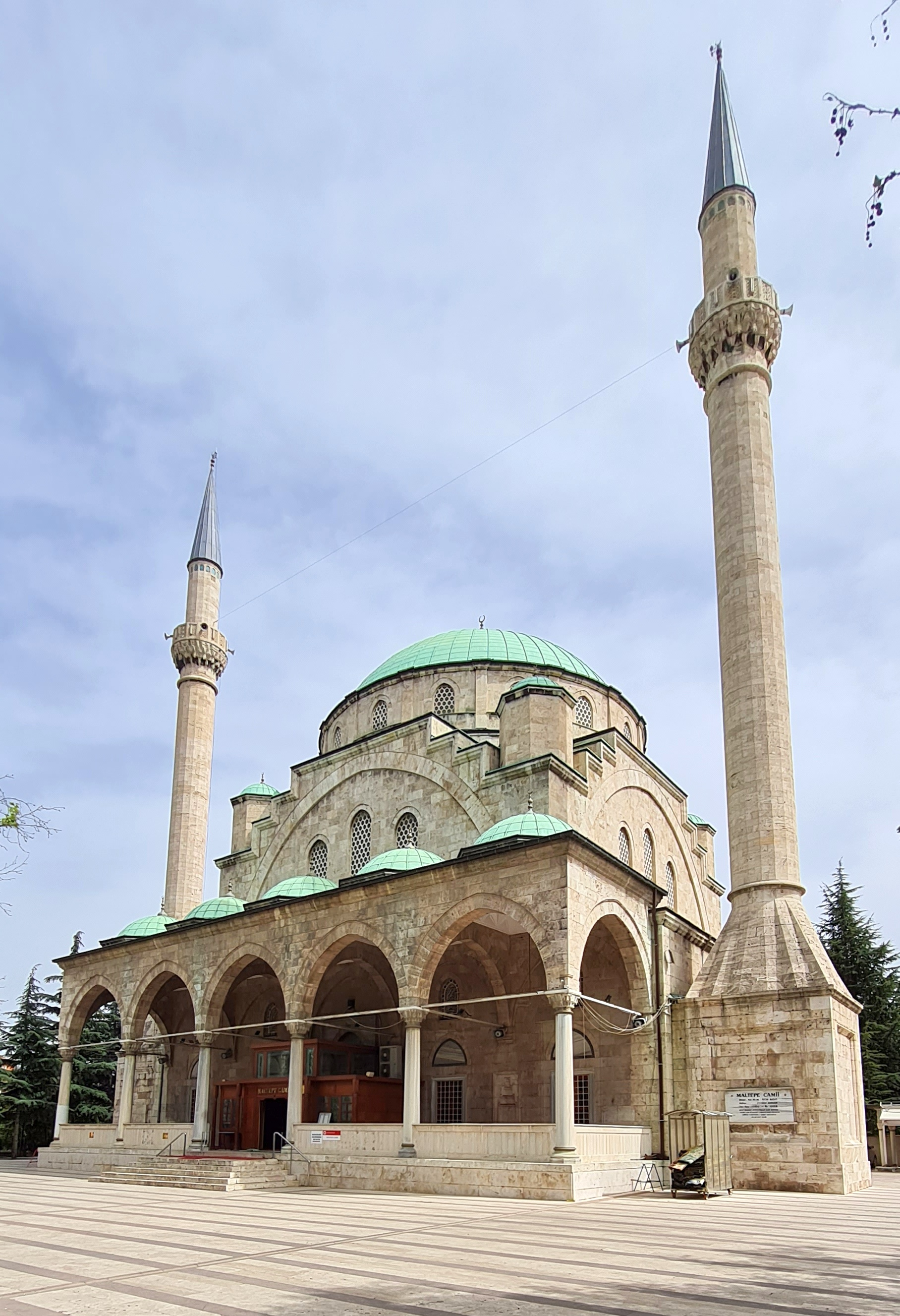

- Location of the mosque in Turkey.

Religion
- Affiliation: Hanafi

Location
- Location: Ankara, Turkey
- Coordinates: 39°55′29″N 32°50′49″E

Architecture
- Architect: Recai Akçay
- Groundbreaking: 1954
- Completed: 1959; 67 years ago

Specifications
- Length: 20 m (66 ft)
- Width: 20 m (66 ft)
- Dome height (outer): 30 m (98 ft)
- Minaret: 2
- Minaret height: 50 m (160 ft)

Maltepe Mosque (Turkish: Maltepe Camii) is a mosque in Ankara, Turkey. Along with Kocatepe Mosque, it is one of the best known mosques in Ankara.

== Location ==
The mosque is situated in Maltepe neighborhood of Ankara at 39°55′29″N 32°50′49″E. Distance to Anıtkabir in the west, is about 900 metres (3,000 ft). Distance to Sıhhiye Square in the east is about 600 metres (2,000 ft).

== History ==
The mosque was commissioned by a NGO established to build the mosque. It was planned by Recai Akçay. The area was consecrated by the municipality of Ankara. The ground breaking ceremony was in 1954 and it was completed in 1959

== The building ==
The total area of the building including the yard is 7,019 square metres (75,550 sq ft). It is a square-plan building each side being 20 metres (66 ft). It is a floor heated mosque. The lower 5 metres (16 ft) of the side walls is coated by ceramic. The height of the single green dome is 30 metres (98 ft) and the two minarets each with one şerefe (balcony) is 50 metres (160 ft).
