= Fatma Şahin =

Turkish chemical engineer and politician

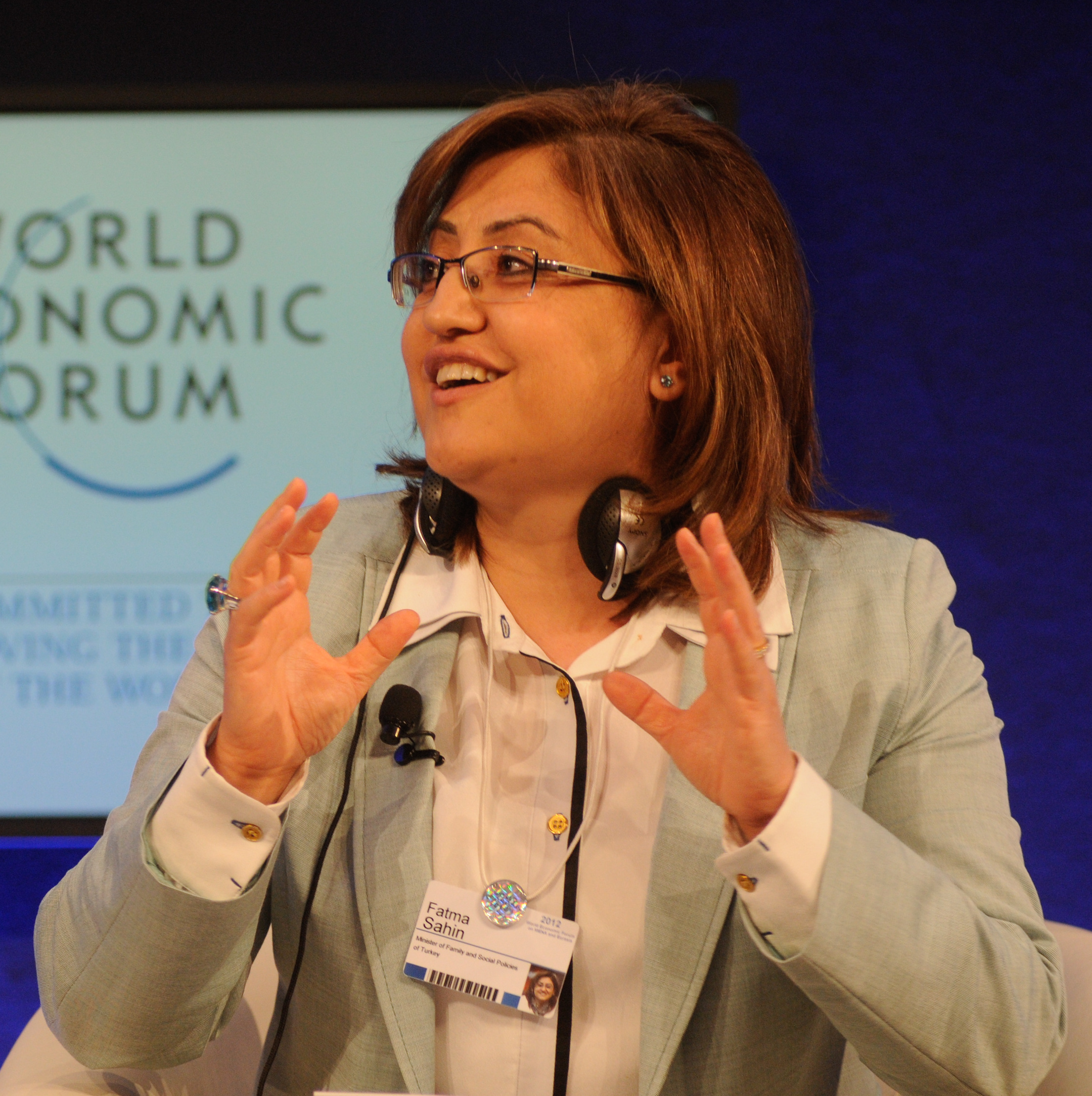
- Fatma Şahin at the World Economic Forum on the Middle East, North Africa, and Eurasia in 2012

Mayor of Gaziantep
- Incumbent
- Assumed office 7 April 2014
- Preceded by: Asım Güzelbey

Minister of Family and Social Policy
- In office 6 July 2011 – 25 December 2013
- Preceded by: Selma Aliye Kavaf
- Succeeded by: Ayşenur İslam

Member of the Grand National Assembly
- In office 3 November 2002 – 7 April 2014
- Constituency: Gaziantep (2002, 2007, 2011)

Personal details
- Born: 20 June 1966 (age 60) Gaziantep, Turkey
- Party: Justice and Development Party (AKP) (2001-present)
- Spouse: İzzet Şahin
- Children: 2
- Education: Chemical engineering
- Alma mater: Istanbul Technical University
- Occupation: Politician, engineer
- Website: www.fatmasahin.net

Fatma Şahin (born 20 June 1966) is a Turkish chemical engineer and politician. On 6 July 2011 she was appointed as the Minister of Family and Social Policies in the third cabinet of Erdoğan.

== Biography ==
She was born on 20 June 1966 in Gaziantep to Mustafa and Perihan Şahin. She was educated in chemical engineering at the Istanbul Technical University. Fatma Şahin worked as an engineer and manager in the textile industry.

She entered politics together with her husband İzzet Şahin and co-founded the Justice and Development Party. Taking active part in the provincial organization, she was elected three times deputy from her hometown. She is the first female member of the Turkish parliament elected from Gaziantep and from the Southeastern Anatolia Region. Fatma Şahin served as the chairperson of women's branch of her party.

Following the 2011 general elections, she became the only female minister in the third cabinet of Prime Minister Recep Tayyip Erdoğan. She was replaced by Ayşenur İslam on 25 December 2013 in a cabinet reshuffle.

As a result of the 2014 local elections, Şahin was elected as the first female mayor of Gaziantep. In 2019 local elections and 2024 local elections, she was elected again as the mayor.

She has two children, a son and a daughter.

Political offices
Preceded by Selma Aliye Kavaf	Minister of Family and Social Policy; 6 July 2011 – 25 December 2013	Succeeded by Ayşenur İslam
