= Zehra Zümrüt Selçuk =

Turkish politician

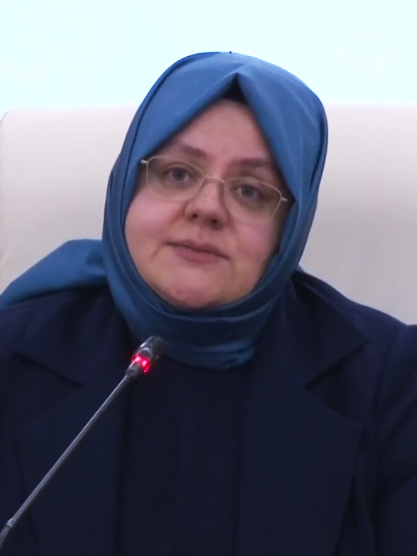

Minister of Family, Labour and Social Services
- In office 10 July 2018 – 21 April 2021
- President: Recep Tayyip Erdoğan
- Preceded by: Jülide Sarıeroğlu (as minister of Labour and Social Security); Fatma Betül Sayan Kaya (as minister of Minister of Family and Social Policy)

Personal details
- Born: 1979 (age 46–47) Ordu, Turkey
- Parent: Atilla Koç (father)
- Education: Economics
- Alma mater: Bilkent University; University of Michigan; University of Texas at Dallas

Zehra Zümrüt Selçuk Koç (born 1979) is a former minister of Family, Labour and Social Services of Turkey.

== Private life ==
Zehra Zümrüt Selçuk was born in Ordu, Turkey in 1979. She is the daughter of the Justice and Development Party (AKP) politician and former Minister of Culture and Tourism Atilla Koç (in office 2005–2007).

After completing her secondary education at Ankara Atatürk Anadolu High School, she studied on full scholarship at Bilkent University earning a Bachelor's degree in Economics. She went to the United States and attended University of Michigan for a doctoral thesis. She continued her studies at University of Texas at Dallas, and received a Master's degree in Accounting and Information Resources Management. Between 2003 and 2007, she served as a research assistant at the same university.

In 2007, she joined the Statistical, Economic and Social Research and Training Centre for Islamic Countries (SESRIC) as a senior research specialist, and became later director of the Department for Statistics and Information. During this time, her working fields were gender, demography, workforce, multi dimensional measurement of poverty, education and innovation, knowledge performance systems, banking and finance, development aid. She coordinated many projects aimed at Sustainable Development Goals and programs for capacity building.

She married Ali Aydın Selçuk in Ankara on 12 April 2008.

Selçuk is member of various associations like "Women's Union Platform" (Turkish: Kadın Birliği Platformu) and Bilkent University Alumni, as well as she is on the board of the Ankara Office of the "Women and Democracy Association" (Kadın ve Demokrasi Derneği, KADEM) and the "I Grow Up With Chess Association" (Satrançla Büyüyorum Derneği).

== Political career ==
On 9 July 2018, the newly elected President of Turkey Recep Tayyip Erdoğan announced his cabinet of the new Turkish political system. Zehra Zümrüt Selçuk was appointed Minister of Family, Labour and Social Services, which combined the two former ministries Labour and Social Security and Family and Social Policy. On 21 April 2021, she was dismissed and the Ministry split again, with Derya Yanık taking over the portfolio Family and Social Services, and Vedat Bilgin the portfolio Labour and Social Security.

Political offices
Preceded by Jülide Sarıeroğlu; Fatma Betül Sayan Kaya	Minister of Family, Labour and Social Services; 10 July 2018 - 21 April 2021	Succeeded by Derya Yanık
