= Türkan Akyol =

Turkish government minister (1928–2017)

Minister of State
- In office June 25, 1993 – October 5, 1995
- Prime Minister: Tansu Çiller
- In office February 22, 1992 – June 25, 1993
- Prime Minister: Süleyman Demirel
- In office March 26, 1971 – December 13, 1971
- Prime Minister: Nihat Erim
- Preceded by: Vedat Ali Özkan
- Succeeded by: Cevdet Aykan

Personal details
- Born: September 12, 1928 Istanbul, Turkey
- Died: September 7, 2017 (aged 88) Ankara, Turkey
- Resting place: Karşıyaka Cemetery
- Citizenship: Turkish
- Party: Social Democracy Party (SODEP)
- Education: Medicine
- Alma mater: Ankara University

Peyman Türkan Akyol (September 12, 1928 – September 7, 2017) was a Turkish politician, physician and academic. She was the first Turkish female government minister, and the first female university rector in Turkey.

== Early life ==
Türkan Akyol was born on September 12, 1928, in Istanbul. She completed her primary education in various places in Turkey due to her father's profession as a staff officer. She graduated from the Erenköy Girls High School in Istanbul, Turkey, in 1947.

== Academic career ==
Akyol was educated in Medicine at Ankara University graduating in 1953. She became a physician specialized in pulmonology and pursued an academic career at her alma mater. She became assistant professor in 1965 and full professor in 1970. Between 1959 and 1965, Akyol conducted academic studies in the United States, France and the Netherlands.

In 1980, Akyol was elected rector of Ankara University, becoming again a first, this time Turkey's first female rector. She served at this post until 1982 when she quit due to disagreements with the Council of Higher Education. She lectured at the university until 1983 when Erdal İnönü invited her to co-found the Social Democracy Party (SODEP). Akyol served the party's deputy chairman.

== Political career ==
On March 25, 1971, she was appointed Minister of Health and Social Security in the cabinet of Nihat Erim, becoming so the first female government minister of Turkey. On December 13 that year, she resigned from her post in the government and returned to the university.

Türkan Akyol entered the parliament as deputy of İzmir Province following the 1987 general election. She returned to her post as lecturer at the end of the legislative term in 1991. In 1992, she was appointed Minister of State responsible for Woman and Family Affairs in the coalition government of Süleyman Demirel. In 1993, she was appointed minister again in the cabinet of Tansu Çiller, Turkey's first woman prime minister.

Akyol died at a hospital in Ankara on September 7, 2017 at the age of 88. She was buried at the Karşıyaka Cemetery following the religious funeral at Maltepe Mosque. She was mother of two children.

== Legacy ==
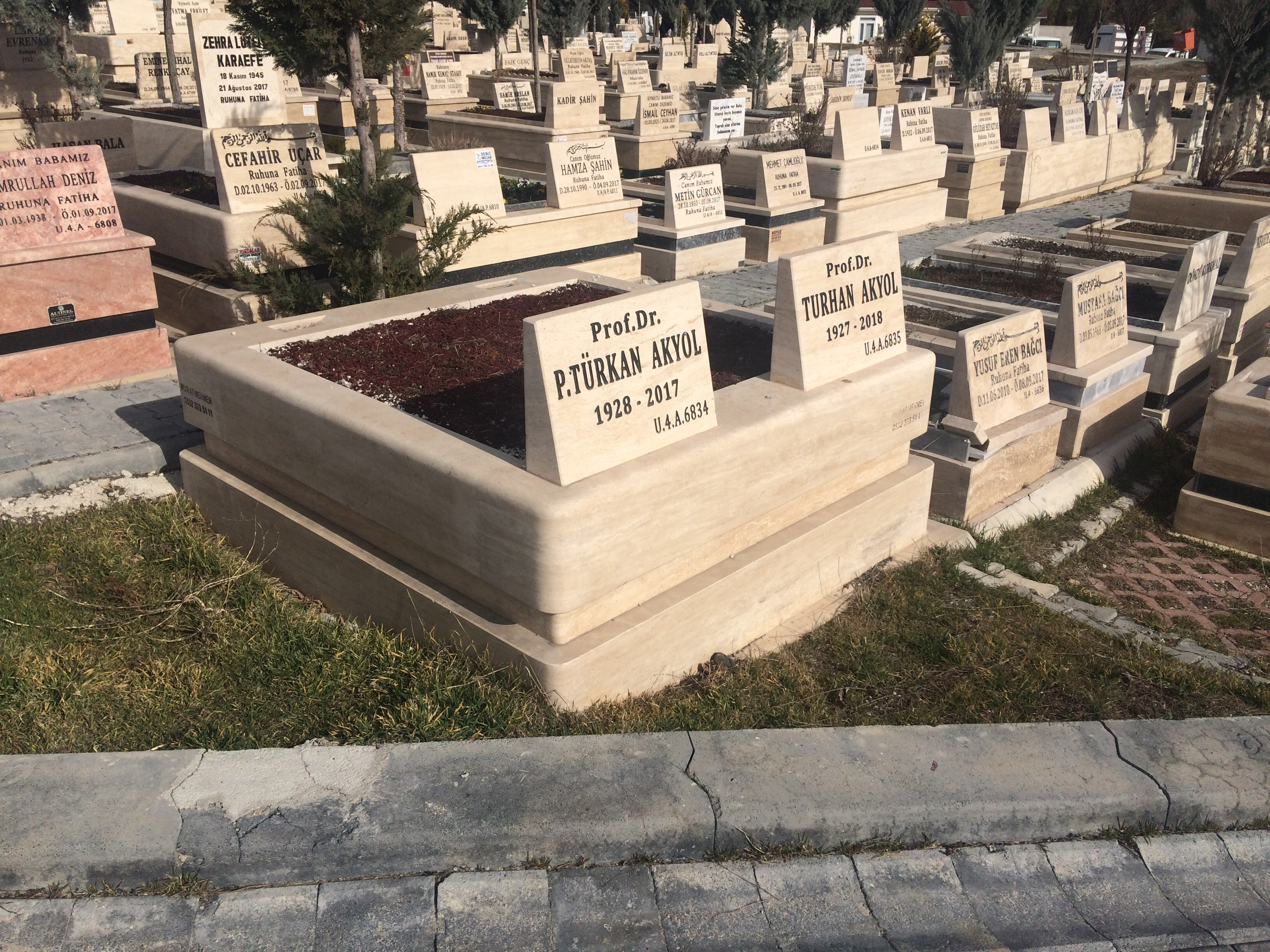
Grave of Türkân Akyol at Karşıyaka Cemetery

There is a hospital in Bursa carrying her name.

== See also ==
- Women in Turkish politics

== Sources ==
- "First female ministers". guide2womenleaders.com.
