= Güldal Akşit =

Turkish politician (1960–2021)

Güldal Akşit

Güldal Akşit (pronounced [ɟyɫdaɫ ˈakʃit]; 23 January 1960 – 3 December 2021) was a Turkish politician and the President of the Parliamentary Commission on Equal Opportunities for Men and Women.

== Biography ==
Güldal Akşit was born in Malatya on 23 January 1960. Her father was a politician, Galip Demirel. She attended the Foreign Languages School of Hacettepe University. Then she graduated from Istanbul University's Faculty of Law.

She was elected as a member of the Grand National Assembly of Turkey, representing Istanbul, and served from 2002 to 2011. She was the minister of culture and tourism in the cabinet of Abdullah Gül and in the first cabinet of Recep Tayyip Erdogan. Akşit was the head of the AKP women's branch and interested in women's rights.

Akşit was married and had no children. She died from COVID-19 in Ankara on 3 December 2021, amid the COVID-19 pandemic in Turkey. She was 61. She is buried at Karşıyaka Cemetery in Ankara.

Political offices
Preceded by Mustafa Taşar	Minister of Culture and Tourism; 18 November 2002 – 14 March 2003	Succeeded by Erkan Mumcu
