= Ali Şahin (politician, born 1970) =

Turkish politician

Ali Şahin MP

Member of the Grand National Assembly
- Incumbent
- Assumed office 8 July 2018
- Constituency: Gaziantep (2018)
- In office 12 June 2011 – 7 June 2015
- Constituency: Gaziantep (2011)

Deputy Minister of European Union Affairs
- Incumbent
- Assumed office 29 May 2016
- Minister: Ömer Çelik
- In office 9 January 2016 – 24 May 2016
- Minister: Volkan Bozkır
- Preceded by: Alaattin Büyükkaya

Personal details
- Born: 2 January 1970 (age 56) Nizip, Gaziantep, Turkey
- Party: Justice and Development Party (AKP)
- Children: 2
- Education: University of Karachi

Ali Şahin (born 2 January 1970) is a Turkish politician who has been Deputy Minister of European Union Affairs since January 2016. He served as a member of parliament for Gaziantep from Justice and Development Party (AKP) between 2011 and 2015. He was a candidate for MP at the June 2015 and November 2015 general elections. He managed to get on the AKP's Gaziantep candidates' lists but did not succeed in being re-elected MP again. He was elected as the TGNA XXVII. period AK Party Gaziantep deputy in the 24 June 2018 parliamentary elections. He served as the AK Party deputy chairman of social policies, a member of the Foreign Affairs Committee of the Parliament, and a member of the PACE Turkish Group. The Sitara-i-Pakistan was conferred upon him in 2020 by the president of Pakistan, Dr. Arif Alvi. He is on duty as the chairman of the Turkiye – Pakistan Parliamentary Friendship Group. He was selected as the administrative chief of the presidency of the Grand National Assembly of Turkey on 9 July 2020. On 6 January 2022, he was selected as the head of the Turkish Delegation of the Latin American and Caribbean Parliament (Parlatino) in the Turkish Grand National Assembly.

Şahin finished his bachelor's and master's degree in international relations from Karachi University, Pakistan, from 1990 to 1997. He is married, has two children and he is fluent in English, Urdu and Arabic.
