= Doğu Garajı =

Historical plot in Muratpaşa, Antalya

Coordinates: 36°53′17″N 30°42′45″E

Doğu Garajı ("Eastern Bus depot") is a historical plot in Muratpaşa, Antalya, which was used to serve as depot of public buses in urban service and terminal for eastern districts of Antalya Province.

A renovation project was proposed in the 1990s by Metropolitan Municipality of Antalya mayored by Hasan Subaşı, which was resulted in an interim "Festival Bazaar" in the 2000s. In the late 2000s, Mayor Menderes Türel broke ground for another renovation project. During the excavations, the southern part was discovered as a necropolis, where remains dating back to the 3rd century BC were unearthed, suggesting that Attalea, what is now Antalya, was a rebuilding and expansion of a town earlier than King Attalus II of Pergamon's foundations.
