= Mevlüt Çavuşoğlu =

Turkish politician (born 1968)

Mevlüt Çavuşoğlu MP
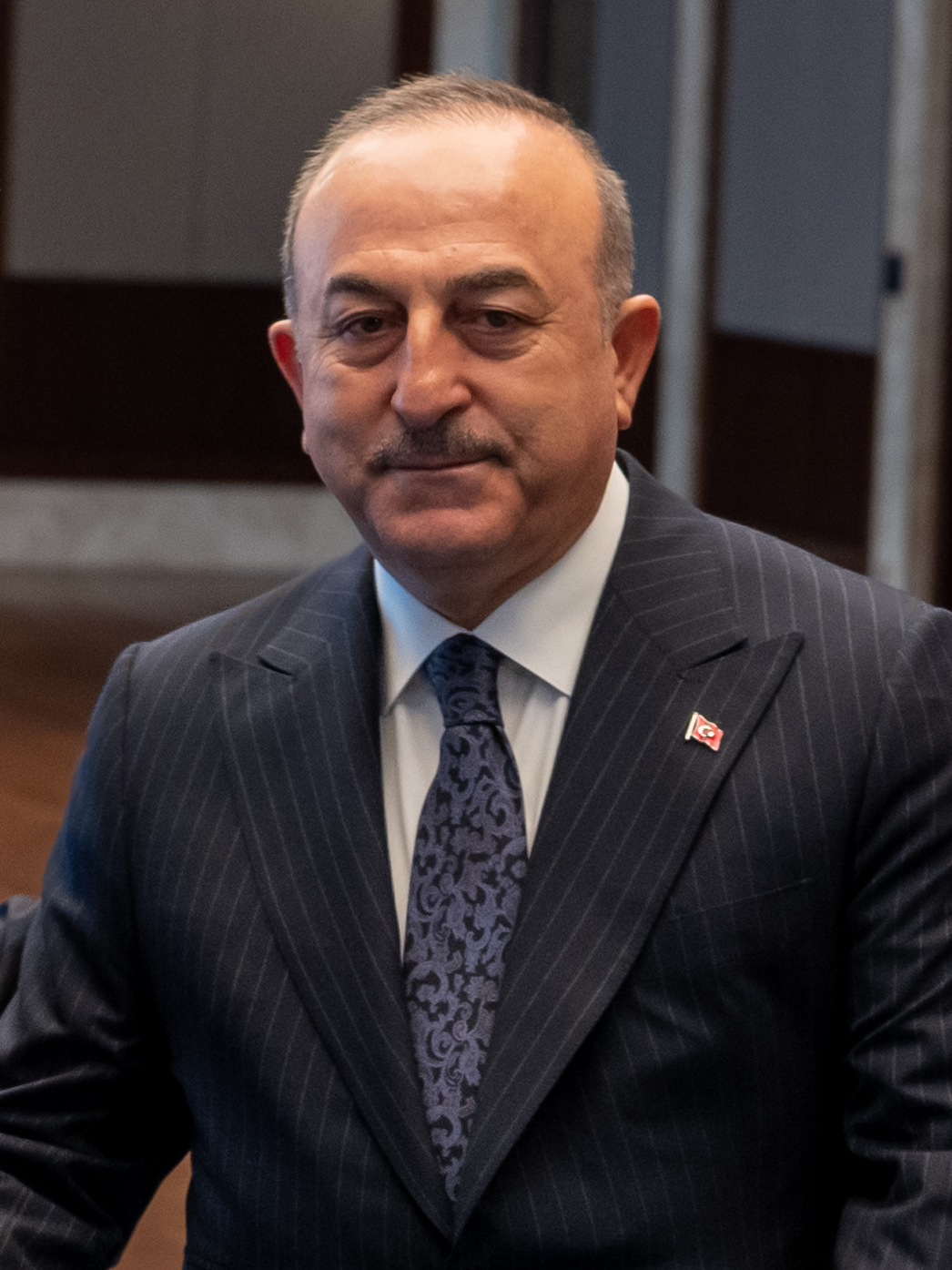
- Çavuşoğlu in 2023

Minister of Foreign Affairs
- In office 24 November 2015 – 4 June 2023
- President: Recep Tayyip Erdoğan
- Prime Minister: Ahmet Davutoğlu; Binali Yıldırım
- Preceded by: Feridun Sinirlioğlu
- Succeeded by: Hakan Fidan
- In office 29 August 2014 – 28 August 2015
- Prime Minister: Ahmet Davutoğlu
- Preceded by: Ahmet Davutoğlu
- Succeeded by: Feridun Sinirlioğlu

Minister of European Union Affairs
- In office 25 December 2013 – 29 August 2014
- Prime Minister: Recep Tayyip Erdoğan
- Preceded by: Egemen Bağış
- Succeeded by: Volkan Bozkır

Chief Negotiator for Turkish Accession to the European Union
- In office 25 December 2013 – 29 August 2014
- Prime Minister: Recep Tayyip Erdoğan
- Preceded by: Egemen Bağış
- Succeeded by: Volkan Bozkır

President of the Parliamentary Assembly of the Council of Europe
- In office 25 January 2010 – 25 January 2012
- Preceded by: Lluís Maria de Puig
- Succeeded by: Jean-Claude Mignon

Member of the Grand National Assembly
- Incumbent
- Assumed office 4 June 2023
- Constituency: Antalya (2023)
- In office 17 November 2015 – 10 July 2018
- Constituency: Antalya (Nov 2015, 2018)
- In office 14 November 2002 – 23 April 2015
- Constituency: Antalya (2002, 2007, 2011)

Personal details
- Born: 5 February 1968 (age 58) Alanya, Turkey
- Party: Justice and Development Party
- Spouse: Hülya Çavuşoğlu
- Children: 1
- Education: Ankara University (BA); Long Island University (MA)
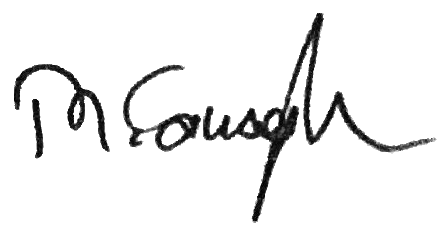
- Signature

Mevlüt Çavuşoğlu (Turkish pronunciation: [mevlyt ˈtʃavuʃˌoːɫu]; born 5 February 1968) is a Turkish diplomat and politician who served as served as Minister of Foreign Affairs of Turkey from August 2014 to August 2015, and again from 24 November 2015 to 4 June 2023. A founding member of Turkish Justice and Development Party (AKP), he has represented Antalya in the Grand National Assembly in several terms since 2002 and as of 2026, heads the Turkish delegation to the NATO Parliamentary Assembly.

Çavuşoğlu became known publicly at the Parliamentary Assembly of the Council of Europe when he chaired the Turkish delegation and served as vice president before being elected to the Assembly's first Turkish president in 2010. He served as Minister of European Union affairs and chief negotiator for Turkeys EU accession from December 2013 to August 2014. As foreign minister, Çavuşoğlu was involved in Turkey's policy on the Syrian Civil War the Eastern Mediterranean maritime disputes, the post 2021 normalisation of relations with several regional states and the Russian invasion of Ukraine, hosting the first meeting between the Russian and Ukrainian foreign ministers since the start of the invasion in Antalya on 12 March 2022. He was also a central figure in the 2017 Dutch–Turkish diplomatic incident, When the Netherlands withdrew landing permission for his aircraft.

== Early life and education ==
Çavuşoğlu was born on 5 February 1968 in Alanya, Antalya Province, Turkey. He graduated in international relations from the Faculty of Political Science, Ankara University, in 1988 and received a masters degree in economics from Long Island University in New York State in 1991. In 1993, he completed a European Union expertise programme at Ankara University's European Research centre. He began doctoral studies in international relations at Bilkent University in Ankara, Turkey, as a special student and carried out research at the London School of Economics between 1993-1995, where he was for a time president of the Turkish Society. Çavuşoğlu did not receive a PhD.

== Early political career ==
=== Parliament and party roles ===
Çavuşoğlu is a founding member of the AKP. He was first elected to parliament from Antalya in the 2002 general election and reelected in 2007 and 2011. He was elected again in 2015 and 2018 and left parliament on 10 July 2018 when the presidential system took effect.

In parliament he chaired the Turkey-United States and Turkey-Japan inter-parliamentary friendship caucuses and in 2007 to 2010 the Turkish delegation to the Assembly of the Western European Union's European Security and Defence Assembly. He was the AKP's vice chairman in charge of foreign affairs in 2013.

=== Council of Europe ===
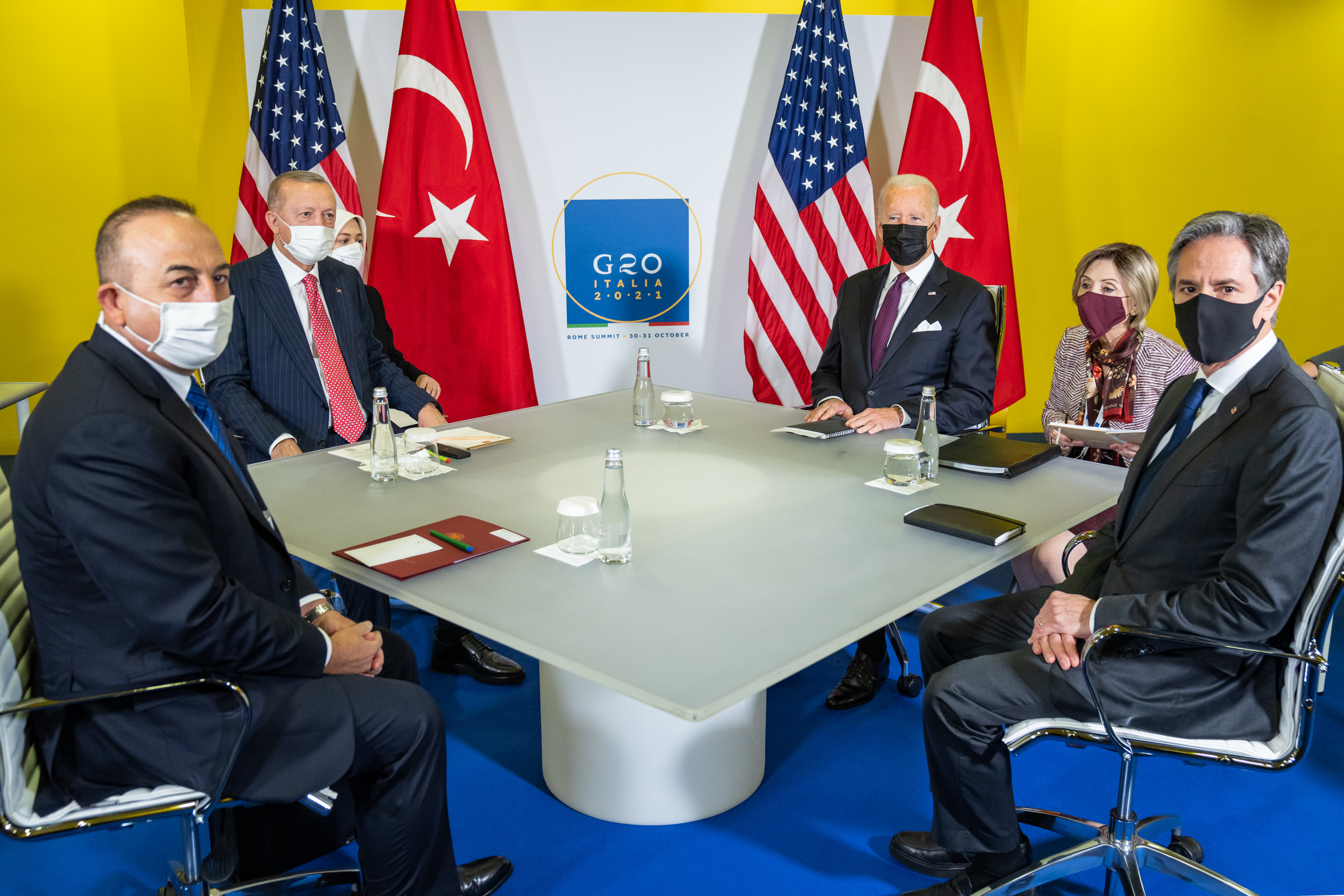
Çavusoğlu in a meeting with US President Biden, Turkish President Erdoğan and US Secretary of State Blinken, October 2021

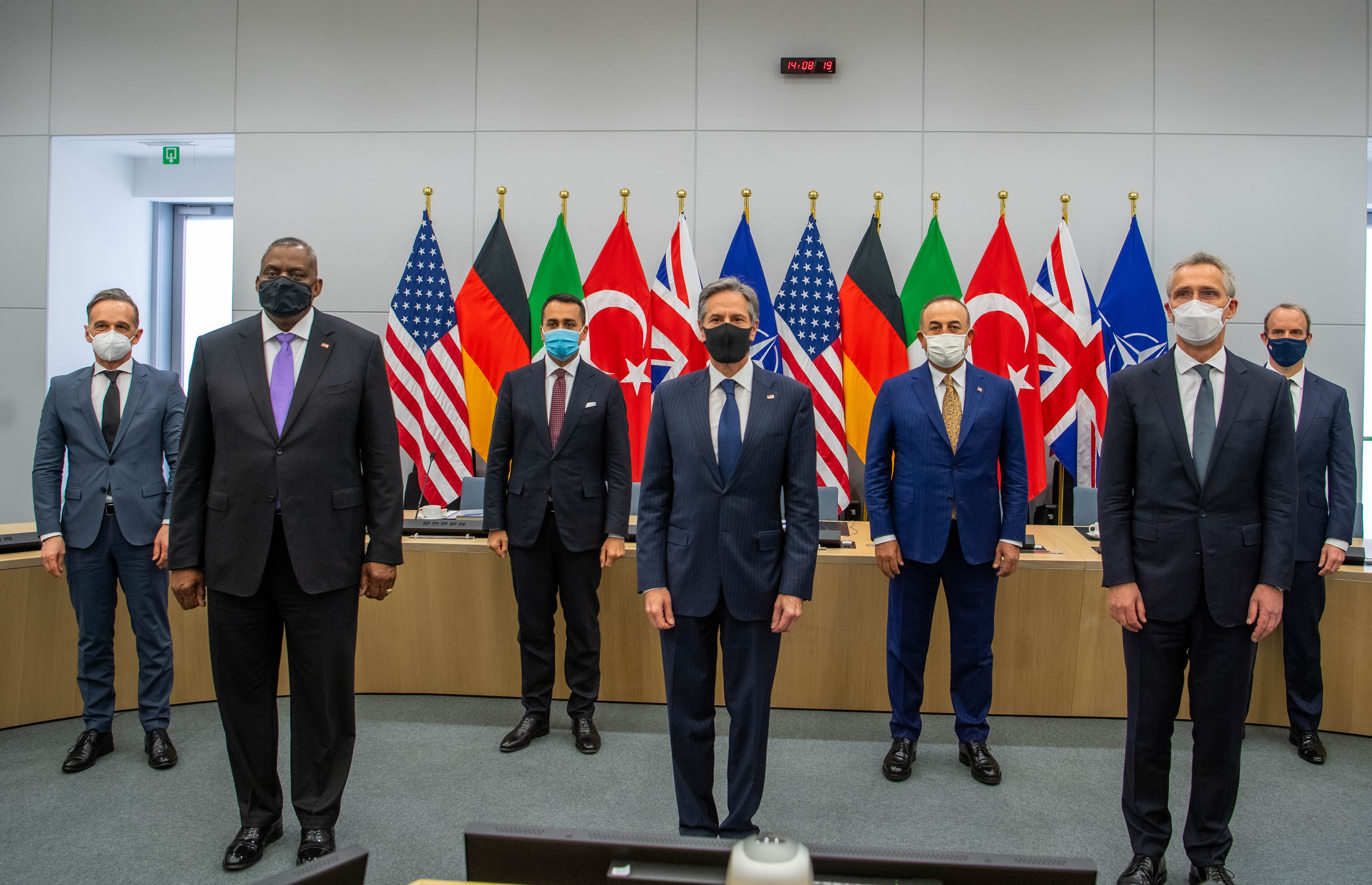
Çavusoğlu at NATO headquarters in Brussels in April 2021

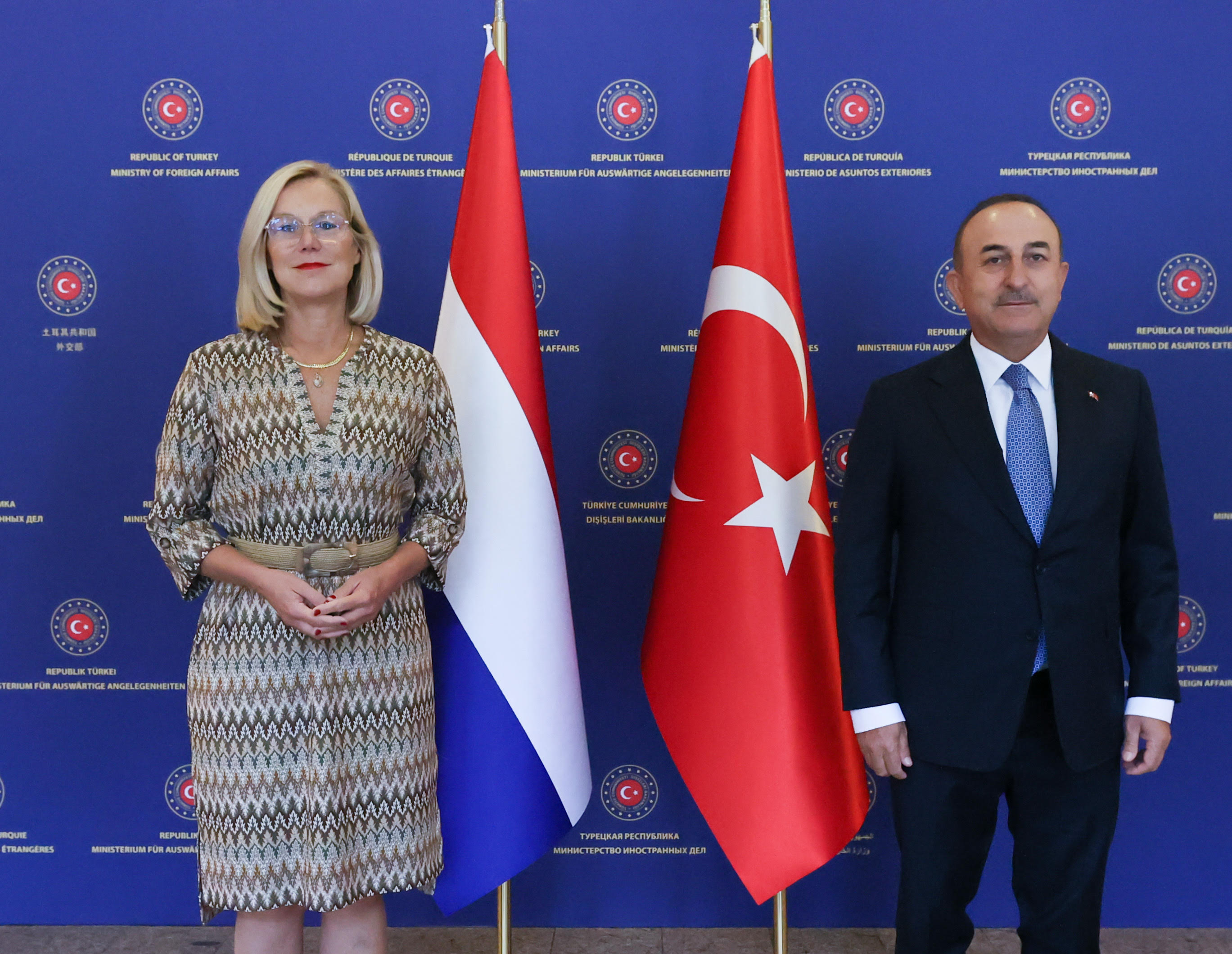
Çavuşoğlu with Dutch Foreign Minister Sigrid Kaag in Ankara, 2 September 2021

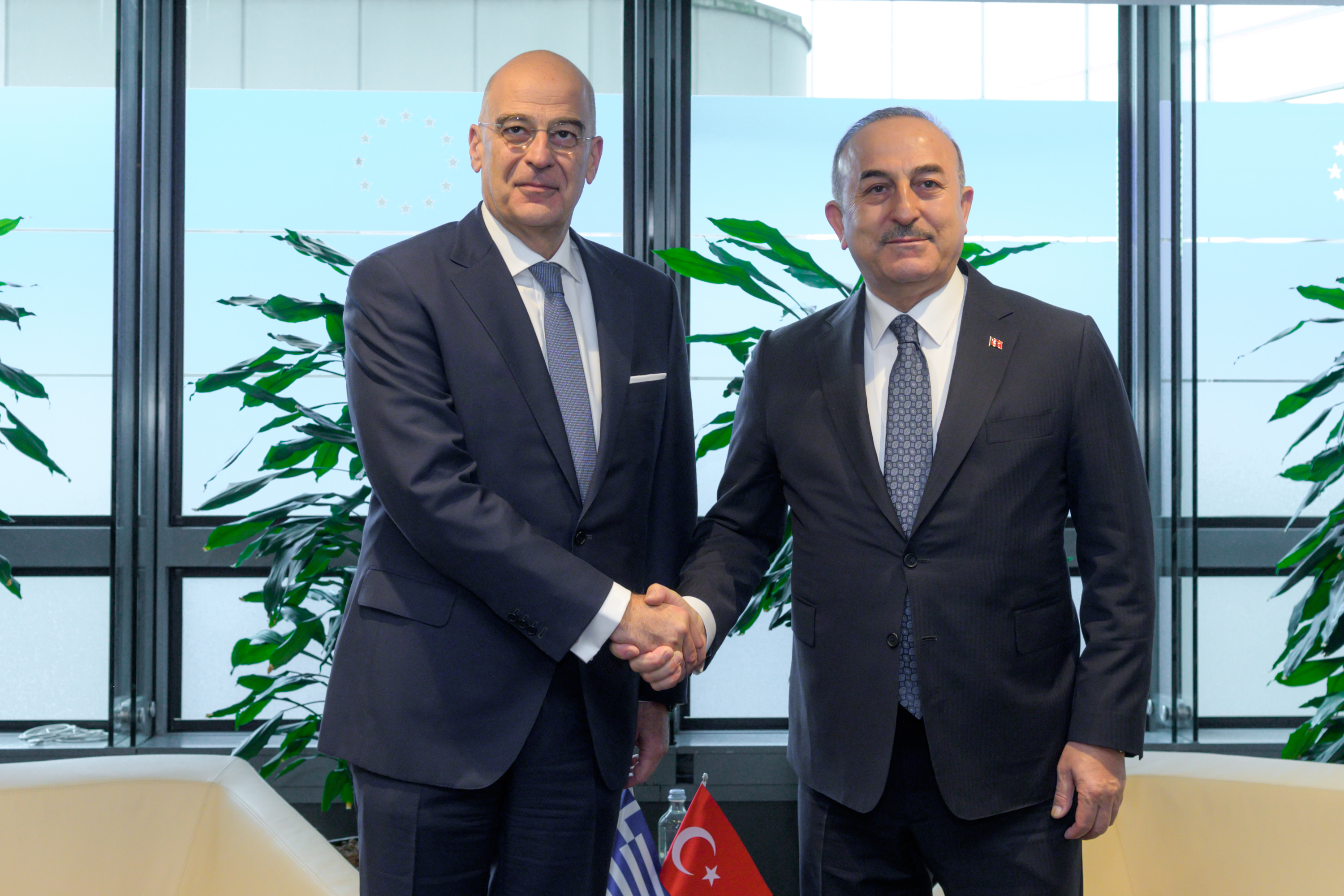
Çavuşoğlu with Greek Foreign Minister Nikos Dendias in Brussels, 20 March 2023

Çavuşoğlu joined the Parliamentary Assembly of the Council of Europe in 2003, and soon became head of the Turkish delegation and a vice-president of the Assembly. He also chaired its Committee on Migration, Refugees and Population and served as second vice chairman and chief whip of the European Democrat Group.

In November 2009 he met with Russian foreign minister Sergey Lavrov in connection with a report the Assembly was preparing on the Soviet famine of 1932–1933. He was nominated and elected PACE president on 25 January 2010 replacing replacing Lluís Maria de Puig, of Spain. His candidacy was backed by all Turkish parties. It was given as the reason he received no extra responsibilities in Erdoğan's government in an October 2009 reshuffle. His election came shortly before Turkey took the chair of the Committee of Ministers of the Council of Europe in November 2010. He was succeeded in 2012 by Jean-Claude Mignon of France and in April 2014 was named Honorary president of the Assembly.

=== Minister of European Union Affairs (2013–2014) ===
Çavuşoğlu became Minister of European Union Affairs and chief negotiator in December 2013 replacing Egemen Bağış, one of the ministers caught up in the corruption scandal that broke out earlier that month. He held the post until 29 August 2014.

=== 2014 Turkish local elections ===
In the 30 March 2014 local election, the AKP candidate Menderes Türel was declared the winner of the Antalya metropolitan mayoralty over the Republican People's Party (CHP) candidate Mustafa Akaydin, by a margine of about 23,000, according to Türel and the AKP's provincial chairman. Akaydın filed an objection with the provincial election board, alleging irregularities and claiming that Çavuşoğlu, who was presented at the courthouse on election night, had put pressure on officials entering results and had reprimanded an election board judge. the AKP's provincial chairman said Çavuşoğlu had visited the election boards briefly to thank those involved in and then left.

=== Minister of Foreign Affairs (2014–2023) ===
Çavuşoğlu was appointed minister of foreign affairs on 29 August 2014 in the government of Ahmet Davutoğlu, and left office after the 2015 interim government under Feridun Sinirlioğlu. He returned to the post on 24 November 2015 and on 9 July 2018, became the first foreign minister under the presidential system.

Hakan Fidan succeeded him after Erdoğan formed a new cabinet following the 2023 elections. When he was appointed in 2014, commentators expected him to continue a foreign policy centred on the Middle East including support for the Muslim Brotherhood aligned groups in Syria and Egypt.

=== Russia and the war in Ukraine ===
After the Russian invasion of the Ukraine in February 2022, Çavuşoğlu proposed that the Russian and Ukrainian foreign ministers meet during the Antalya Diplomacy Forum, and on 10 March 2022 he hosted Sergey Lavrov and Dmytro Kuleba in a trilateral meeting, the first between the two ministers since the start of the invasion. Afterwards he said that the possibility of a Putin–Zelensky meeting had been discussed and that the Ukrainian side said Zelensky was ready for one while Lavrov said Putin was not opposed to it in principal.

On 22 July, 2022, Turkey, the United Nations, Russia and the Ukraine signed the Black Sea Grain Initiative in Istanbul.

=== Syria ===
Syria remained a central item on Çavuşoğlu agenda throughout his tenure. In December 2022 he said that Turkey and Damascus were in contact at the level of intelligence agencies and that Turkey was ready to cooperate with the Syrian government on counter terrorism, the political process and the return of refugees if it took a realistic approach.

In March 2023 he met the Russian, Iranian and Syrian foreign ministers in Moscow.

=== Eastern Mediterranean and regional normalisation ===
In the Eastern Mediterranean gas and maritime zone dispute, Çavuşoğlu rejected the Greece-Egypt delimitation of exclusive economic zones, which Turkey said infringed its continental shelf and overlaps zones it agreed with Libya. From 2021, Turkey sought to repair relations with Egypt, Israel, the United Arab Emirates, Saudi Arabia and Armenia and Çavuşoğlu said improved relations with Egypt are vital for the Eastern Mediterranean.

=== Armenia and Azerbaijan ===
Çavuşoğlu said the normalisation of relations with Armenia was being conducted in coordination with Azerbaijan, after meeting Armenian foreign minister Ararat Mirzoyan at the Antalya Diplomacy Forum in March 2022. On 12 September 2022, as fighting broke out along the Armenia-Azerbaijan border, he wrote that Armenia should stop its "provocation" and focus on negotiation with Azerbaijan.

=== NATO enlargement ===
On 14 May 2022, Çavuşoğlu said Turkey supported NATO's open door policy but accused Finland and Sweden of supporting the Kurdistan Workers' Party (PKK), and said the issue should be discussed within NATO. On 11 June 2022, he said that Russia and terrorism were the two most important threats facing the alliance.

=== Afghanistan ===
After the fall of Kabul in August 2021, Çavuşoğlu said Turkey was in talks with all parties in Afghanistan, including the Taliban, and viewed positively the messages the group had sent. The ministry said the Turkish embassy in Kabul will remain open. In October 2021 he met Taliban foreign minister Amir Khan Muttaqi in Ankara and urged the international community to engage with Taliban officials.

=== 2017 Rotterdam landing ban ===
In 11 March 2017, Çavuşoğlu was banned from landing in Rotterdam, the Netherlands, after threats of Turkish sanctions if his visit to Rotterdam was impeded, made "the search for a reasonable solution impossible". Çavuşoğlu had planned to organize a large gathering to talk about the 2017 Turkish constitutional referendum, in which many Dutch-based émigrés can vote. However, his presence was claimed by the Dutch authorities to be a threat to public safety, and Çavuşoğlu was turned away, despite being the Turkish Foreign Minister.

Meanwhile, Turkish President Recep Tayyip Erdoğan called the Netherlands, "Nazi remnants" and "fascists," which Dutch Prime Minister Mark Rutte called "a crazy remark." Çavuşoğlu followed by defending Erdoğan's remark, and by saying that the Netherlands was the "capital of fascism".

== After 2023 ==
Following the May 2023 elections he returned to parliament as AKP member for Antalya and became chairman of the Turkish delegation to the NATO Parliamentary Assembly, a position he still held in July 2026.

== Personal life ==
Çavuşoğlu is married, with one child. He speaks Turkish, English, German, and Japanese. He also studies the Russian language, only having spoken it publicly in limited settings, and described himself as being on "an intermediate level". His brother Hasan is the president of the Alanyaspor football club.

== Honours and medals ==
Ribbon bar	Award or decoration	Country	Date	Place	Note	Ref.
	Order of Merit of Ukraine (3rd Class)	Ukraine	24 August 2013	Kyiv		
	Grand Cordon of the Order of the Rising Sun	Japan	9 August 2019	Ankara		
	Order of Friendship	Azerbaijan	5 February 2020	Baku		
	Order of Merit of Ukraine (2nd Class)	Ukraine	22 August 2020	Kyiv		
	Crescent of Pakistan	Pakistan	12 January 2021	Islamabad		

== See also ==
- List of foreign ministers in 2017
- List of current foreign ministers

Political offices
Preceded by Egemen Bağış	Minister of European Union Affairs; 2013–2014	Succeeded by Volkan Bozkır
Preceded by Ahmet Davutoğlu	Minister of Foreign Affairs; 2014–2015	Succeeded by Feridun Sinirlioğlu
Preceded by Feridun Sinirlioğlu	Minister of Foreign Affairs; 2015–2023	Succeeded by Hakan Fidan
