= Kuyularonu Mosque =

Mosque in Alanya, Turkey

- Kuyularönü Camii
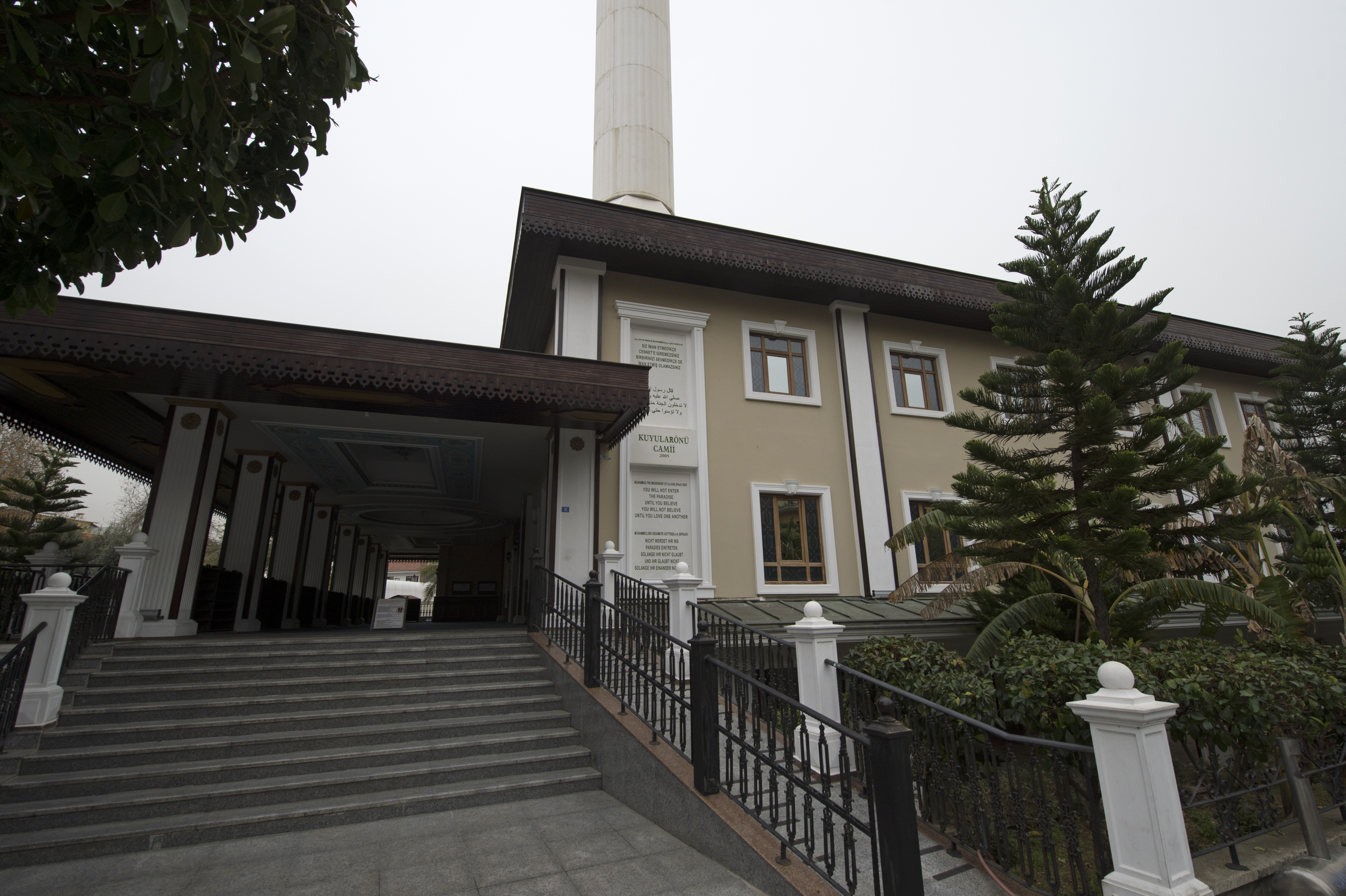

Religion
- Affiliation: Islam

Location
- Municipality: Alanya
- State: Antalya Province
- Country: Turkey
- Interactive map of Kuyularonu Mosque

Architecture
- Type: mosque
- Completed: 1471 (old building); February 2006 (current building)

The Kuyularonu Mosque (Turkish: Kuyularönü Camii) is a mosque in Turkey situated in the city of Alanya in the province of Antalya Province.

The original mosque was built in 1471, and had major restorations in 1765 and 1942. The mosque was demolished in 2005 as part of another restoration. The new structure was opened in February 2006. The opening ceremony was attended by MP Mevlüt Çavuşoğlu and a priest.

The minaret was made out of wood until the 20th century. The current structure has two floors made out of stone and bricks. The mihrab in the mosque is 530 cm tall and 440 cm wide. The Kuyularonu Mosque has approximately 10000 visitors every day, 200 of which are non-local tourists.
