= Chief Negotiator for Turkish Accession to the European Union =

- Avrupa Birliği Başmüzakerecisi
- Emblem of Ministry of European Union Affairs
- Ministry of European Union Affairs and Chief Negotiator
- Appointer: Prime Minister of Turkey
- Term length: No term limit
- Inaugural holder: Ali Babacan
- Formation: January 17, 2005
- Final holder: Ömer Çelik
- Abolished: May 9, 2018
- Website: Ministry of European Union Affairs

The Chief Negotiator for Turkish Accession to the European Union (Turkish: Avrupa Birliği Başmüzakerecisi) was the most senior official representing the Republic of Turkey during the country's accession negotiations to the European Union. The position was established on 17 January 2005 by Prime Minister Recep Tayyip Erdoğan. Following the establishment of the Ministry of European Union Affairs on 29 June 2011, the Minister of European Union Affairs was usually appointed concurrently to serve as the Chief Negotiator. The last Chief Negotiator was the EU Affairs Minister Ömer Çelik, in office between 2016–2018.

== History ==
With formal accession talks between Turkey and the European Union beginning in the years 2004 and 2005, the role of Chief Negotiator was established to represent the Turkish delegation during the membership negotiations. Prime Minister Recep Tayyip Erdoğan appointed Ali Babacan as the first Chief Negotiator on 17 January 2005, while the then-Foreign Minister Abdullah Gül became the president of the Turkish delegation.

When the Ministry of European Union Affairs was established on 29 June 2011 before Erdoğan formed his third and final government, the Minister responsible for the new department began serving concurrently as the Chief Negotiator. The only event in which this was not the case occurred between 28 August and 22 September 2015, where Ali Haydar Konca was appointed as the Minister for European Union Affairs but was not, according to official records, appointed as the Chief Negotiator.

=== List of former Chief Negotiators ===
#	Image	Minister	Term start	Term end	Party	Government
1		Ali Babacan (1967– )	17 January 2005	11 January 2009	Justice and Development Party	59th and 60th
2		Egemen Bağış (1970– )	11 January 2009	25 December 2013	Justice and Development Party	60th and 61st
3		Mevlüt Çavuşoğlu (1968– )	25 December 2013	29 August 2014	Justice and Development Party	61st
4		Volkan Bozkır (1950– )	29 August 2014	28 August 2015	Justice and Development Party	62nd
Vacant (28 August 2015 – 22 September 2015)
5		Beril Dedeoğlu (1961–2019)	22 September 2015	17 November 2015	Independent	63rd
(4)		Volkan Bozkır (1950– )	24 November 2015	24 May 2016	Justice and Development Party	64th
6		Ömer Çelik (1968– )	24 May 2016	9 May 2018	Justice and Development Party	65th

== See also ==
- Accession of Turkey to the European Union
