= Tuba Nur Sönmez =

Turkish Diplomat

Tûba Nur Sönmez is the incumbent Ambassador of the Republic of Turkey to Kuwait and former adviser to Recep Tayyip Erdoğan, the President of Turkey on foreign policies, public and cultural diplomacies. She succeeded Ambassador Ayşe Hilal Sayan Koytak who resumed office on 26 October 2017.

She attended and graduated from the political science department of International Islamic University Malaysia, She worked as an advisor to the Ministry of European Union Affairs (Turkey)(Turkish: Avrupa Birliği Bakanlığı) and as the Foreign Affairs Coordinator at the Justice and Development Party (Turkey)(AK Parti) Headquarters. She speaks English, Arabic, Persian and Malay.
