= Antalya (electoral district) =

Electoral district for the Grand National Assembly of Turkey

Coordinates: 37°50′N 34°45′E

- electoral district for the Grand National Assembly of Turkey
- Antalya shown within Turkey
- Province: Antalya
- Electorate: 1,389,196

Current electoral district
- Created: 1920
- Seats: 14 Historical: 13 (2002–2007) 12 (1999)
- Turnout at last election: 86.42%
- Representation
- AK Party: 7 / 14
- CHP: 5 / 14
- MHP: 2 / 14

Antalya is an electoral district of the Grand National Assembly of Turkey. It elects fourteen members of parliament (deputies) to represent the province of the same name for a four-year term by the D'Hondt method, a party-list proportional representation system.

== Members ==
Population reviews of each electoral district are conducted before each general election, which can lead to certain districts being granted a smaller or greater number of parliamentary seats. Antalya is a gradually growing district, with its seats increasing from 12 to 14 between 1999 and 2011.

MPs for Antalya, 2002 onwards
Election	2002 (22nd Parliament)	2007 (23rd Parliament)	2011 (24th Parliament)	June 2015 (25th Parliament)	November 2015 (26th Parliament)
MP	Osman Akman; AK Party	Abdurrahman Arıcı; AK Party	Gökce Özdoğan Enç; AK Party		
MP	Fikret Badazlı; AK Party	Sadık Badak; AK Party		Lütfi Elvan; AK Party	Mevlüt Çavuşoğlu; AK Party
MP	Mevlüt Çavuşoğlu; AK Party			Mustafa Köse; AK Party	
MP	Mehmet Dülger; AK Party	Yusuf Ziya İrbeç; AK Party	Hüseyin Samani; AK Party		
MP	Burhan Kılıç; AK Party	Mehmet Ali Şahin; AK Party	Mehmet Vecdi Gönül; AK Party	Sena Nur Çelik; AK Party	
MP	Feridun Fikret Baloğlu; CHP	Hüsnü Çollu; CHP	Menderes Tevfik Türel; AK Party	Saruhan Oluç; HDP	İbrahim Aydın; AK Party
MP	Nail Kamacı; CHP	Tunca Toskay; MHP		Tarkan Akıllı; MHP	Atay Uslu; AK Party
MP	Osman Özcan; CHP	Mehmet Günal; MHP			
MP	No seat		Yusuf Ziya İrbeç; MHP	Ahmet Selim Yurdakul; MHP	
MP	Deniz Baykal; CHP				
MP	Hüseyin Ekmekçioğlu; CHP	Tayfur Süner; CHP	Yıldıray Sapan; CHP	Niyazi Nefi Kara; CHP	
MP	Osman Kaptan; CHP			Çetin Osman Budak; CHP	
MP	Atilla Emek; CHP		Gürkut Acar; CHP	Mustafa Akaydın; CHP	
MP	Tuncay Ercenk; CHP	Hüseyin Yıldız; MHP	Arif Bulut; CHP	Devrim Kök; CHP	

== General elections ==
=== 2011 ===
2011 general election: Antalya
Party	Candidate	Votes	%	±%
AK Party	6 elected ▲1: 1. Mehmet Vecdi Gönül ✓; 2. Mevlüt Çavuşoğlu ✓; 3. Menderes Mehmet Tevfik Türel ✓; 4. Sadık Badak ✓; 5. Hüseyin Samani ✓; 6. Gökcen Özdoğan Enç ✓; 7. Abdurrahman Arıcı ✗; 8. Veysel Dalmaz ✗; 9. Osman Akman ✗; 10. Abdullah Cengiz ✗; 11. Ahmet Şahin ✗; 12. İbrahim Türkiş ✗; 13. Gülderen Gültekin ✗; 14. Hakkı Beşkazalı ✗	462,963	39.30	▲5.27
CHP	5 elected 0: 1. Deniz Baykal ✓; 2. Osman Kaptan ✓; 3. Gürkut Acar ✓; 4. Yıldıray Sapan ✓; 5. Arif Bulut ✓; 6. Hakan Şimşek ✗; 7. Sevgi Doğan ✗; 8. Alican Deveci ✗; 9. Aydın özer ✗; 10. Mihriye Bozbay ✗; 11. Osman Fevzi Orakçal ✗; 12. Mehmet Ali Yılmaz ✗; 13. Levent Kıldır ✗; 14. Ahmet Daloğlu ✗	391,400	33.22	▲4.15
MHP	3 elected 0: 1. Tunca Toskay ✓; 2. Mehmet Günal ✓; 3. Yusuf Ziya İrbeç ✓; 4. Kemal Çelik ✗; 5. Hüseyin Yıldız ✗; 6. Mesut Yılmaz ✗; 7. Raşit Doğan Enhoş ✗; 8. Feridun Bahşi ✗; 9. Ayça Sezer ✗; 10. Fevzi Yarbaş ✗; 11. Ramazan Eryılmaz ✗; 12. Yaşar Körk ✗; 13. Nurettin Demirkol ✗; 14. Meryem Aksoy ✗	245,901	20.87	▲0.91
Independent	None elected: Hasan Atilla Uğur ✗ Zeliha Daşıyıcı ✗ İhsan Nergiz ✗	28,182	2.39	▲0.61
DP	None elected: 1. Süleyman Sarıkaya ✗; 2. Mustafa Özman ✗; 3. Bülent Tütüncü ✗; 4. Feda Barut ✗; 5. Hayri Arslan ✗; 6. Mütehhare Değer ✗; 7. Nazım Şahin ✗; 8. Mustafa Kar ✗; 9. Süleyman Aktaş ✗; 10. Ali Özen ✗; 11. İbrahim Çağın ✗; 12. Ali Yiğit ✗; 13. İsa Tok ✗; 14. Mehmet İlteber Bahadır ✗	9,777	0.83	▼9.02
SAADET	None elected: 1. Galip Akın ✗; 2. Abbas Çağlar ✗; 3. Ziya Çimen ✗; 4. Hasan Burgan ✗; 5. Fatma Özkaynak ✗; 6. Osman Nuri Açıkgöz ✗; 7. Tuncay Çakır ✗; 8. Nuri Kaplan ✗; 9. Muharrem Koçak ✗; 10. Selahattin Bıçakcı ✗; 11. Mehmet Ali Can ✗; 12. Abdurrahman Tural ✗; 13. Fatime Üraz ✗; 14. Erdal Gümüş ✗	9,533	0.81	▼0.51
HAS Party	None elected: 1. Ali Aktaş ✗; 2. Hasan Uğur ✗; 3. Nizamettin Işık ✗; 4. Ulaş Göktaş ✗; 5. Nazan Taner ✗; 6. Hasan Özdemir ✗; 7. Yücel Temiz ✗; 8. Alpaslan Burak Zorlu ✗; 9. Ebru Balcı ✗; 10. Cemil Türker ✗; 11. Bayram Yıldız ✗; 12. Numan Sanlı ✗; 13. Murat Özel ✗; 14. Ramazan Süren ✗	7,081	0.60	▲0.60
Büyük Birlik	None elected: 1. Rasim Küçük ✗; 2. Orhan Ak ✗; 3. Tuncer Ulay ✗; 4. Alper Köleoğlu ✗; 5. Şeyhmus Birol ✗; 6. Selma Kış ✗; 7. Fecrin Öngören ✗; 8. Mesut Erdi ✗; 9. Kürşat Günaydın ✗; 10. Ayşena Çin ✗; 11. Recep Köken ✗; 12. Ahmet Has ✗; 13. Eyyüp Koçak ✗; 14. Hasan Almaz ✗	6,235	0.53	▲0.53
HEPAR	None elected: 1. Orhan Saygın ✗; 2. Rukiye Çamlıyer ✗; 3. İsmet Çamdere ✗; 4. Cemal Kılıç ✗; 5. Ali Serttaş ✗; 6. Mustafa Ayaz ✗; 7. Selma Erdi ✗; 8. Süleyman Altınok ✗; 9. Ömer Toprak ✗; 10. Teslime Bahadır ✗; 11. Şenol Kaplan ✗; 12. Şükrü İlhan ✗; 13. Mustafa Yıldırım ✗; 14. Ergun Arkın ✗	4,291	0.36	▲0.36
DYP	None elected: 1. Yiğit Zeki Öztürk ✗; 2. Sedat Koç ✗; 3. Mehmet Çalım ✗; 4. Mehmet Avcı ✗; 5. Ercan Kızılkaya ✗; 6. Ali Hikmet Kaba ✗; 7. İbrahim Senek ✗; 8. Cemile Aka ✗; 9. Gülden Tosun ✗; 10. Ferihan Demircan ✗; 11. Esma Özdemir ✗; 12. Necati Yörük ✗; 13. İsmet Ilıcan ✗; 14. Zafer Süzgen ✗	3,394	0.29	▲0.29
DSP	None elected: 1. Ragıp Hazar ✗; 2. Ayda Nur Gül ✗; 3. Nuray Ercan ✗; 4. Hatice Çağar ✗; 5. Murat Altay ✗; 6. Gülşen Ilık ✗; 7. Bekir Özbilim ✗; 8. Makbule Dilek Demirkan ✗; 9. Cumali Şentekin ✗; 10. Suna Özdemir ✗; 11. Hasan Aydemir ✗; 12. Metin Oktay ✗; 13. Gülşen İnandık ✗; 14. Olcay Polat ✗	2,949	0.25	N/A
MP	None elected: 1. Ramazan Özen ✗; 2. Muhammet Gümüşkaynak ✗; 3. Veli Gökçe ✗; 4. Osman Soydal ✗; 5. Kamil Şentürk ✗; 6. Necati Şahin ✗; 7. Mehmet Ali Karaardıç ✗; 8. Adem Gencöz ✗; 9. Hanife Korkmaz ✗; 10. Mustafa Koyuncu ✗; 11. Celal Bayar ✗; 12. Mehmet Fatih Yılmaz ✗; 13. Nihat Gökmen ✗; 14. Hikmet Keçeci ✗	2,949	0.25	▲0.25
TKP	None elected: 1. Levent Tunçel ✗; 2. Göktuğ Özgül ✗; 3. Elif Aslan ✗; 4. Muhlis Turan ✗; 5. Ayşe Kılınç ✗; 6. Sefa Seyitoğlu ✗; 7. Nuri Kadak ✗; 8. Dilek Arslan ✗; 9. Sevinç İlkuçan ✗; 10. Semiha Kahraman ✗; 11. Erhan Altınkaynak ✗; 12. Birkan Kaya ✗; 13. Volkan Dağlı ✗; 14. Ahmet Akkoç ✗	1,684	0.14	▼0.04
Nationalist Conservative	None elected: 1. Ensar Kan ✗; 2. Enver Bıçakçı ✗; 3. Fatma Firidin ✗; 4. Kürşad Zeybek ✗; 5. Yılmaz Demirbağ ✗; 6. Hacere Engin ✗; 7. Leyla Engin ✗; 8. Zeliha Firidin ✗; 9. Mehmet Sait Işık ✗; 10. Rahime Kantar ✗; 11. Şükrü Yılmaz ✗; 12. İsmail Sungur ✗; 13. Gökhan Pelin ✗; 14. Neslihan Cigal ✗	1,510	0.13	▲0.13
Liberal Democrat	None elected: 1. Avni Şen ✗; 2. Ahmet Ballı ✗; 3. Hamdi Atalay Öçsu ✗; 4. Mehmet Akif Yalın ✗; 5. Sevil Tavşan ✗; 6. Fahri Tohan Koçak ✗; 7. Ahmet Vefik Yalın ✗; 8. Hatice Gülbin Artoksi ✗; 9. Ali Olgun ✗; 10. Ali İhsan Çınar ✗; 11. Mete Şenol ✗; 12. Fatoş Özen ✗; 13. Mehmet Beyaz ✗; 14. Soner Keçeci ✗	547	0.05	▼0.10
Labour	No candidates	0	0.00	0.00
Total votes		1,178,084	100.00	
Rejected ballots		25,967	2.16	▲0.14
Turnout		1,200,592	86.42	▲2.05
AK Party hold Majority		71,563	6.07	▲1.13

=== June 2015 ===
Abbr.	Party	Votes	%
AK Party	Justice and Development Party	456,645	34.9%
CHP	Republican People's Party	429,075	32.8%
MHP	Nationalist Movement Party	287,161	22%
HDP	Peoples' Democratic Party	90,644	6.9%
SP	Felicity Party	17,085	1.3%
	Other	26,168	2%
Total		1,306,778	
Turnout		85.05	
source: YSK

=== November 2015 ===
Abbr.	Party	Votes	%
AK Party	Justice and Development Party	560,344	41.3%
CHP	Republican People's Party	451,878	33.3%
MHP	Nationalist Movement Party	238,820	17.6%
HDP	Peoples' Democratic Party	75,366	5.6%
SP	Felicity Party	6,282	0.5%
	Other	23,469	1.7%
Total		1,356,159	
Turnout		86.54	
source: YSK

=== 2018 ===
Abbr.	Party	Votes	%
AK Party	Justice and Development Party	485,103	33.8%
CHP	Republican People's Party	420,963	29.3%
IYI	Good Party	246,905	17.2%
MHP	Nationalist Movement Party	143,406	10%
HDP	Peoples' Democratic Party	100,782	7%
SP	Felicity Party	13,781	1%
	Other	24,950	1.7%
Total		1,435,890	
Turnout		87.36	
source: YSK

== Presidential elections ==
=== 2014 ===
2014 presidential election: Antalya
Party	Candidate	Votes	%
Independent	Ekmeleddin İhsanoğlu	584,677	53.08
AK Party	Recep Tayyip Erdoğan	458,542	41.63
HDP	Selahattin Demirtaş	58,339	5.30
Total votes		1,101,558	100.00
Rejected ballots		19,317	1.72
Turnout		1,120,875	73.38
Ekmeleddin İhsanoğlu win			
