= Directorate for EU Affairs =

- Avrupa Birliği Başkanlığı

Agency overview
- Formed: 2018
- Preceding agency: Ministry of European Union Affairs
- Headquarters: Mustafa Kemal Mah. 2082 Cad. No:5 Çankaya / Ankara
- Agency executive: Mehmet Kemal Bozay, President
- Parent agency: Ministry of Foreign Affairs
- Website: ab.gov.tr

In Turkey, the Directorate for EU Affairs (Turkish: Avrupa Birliği Başkanlığı) is a government agency affiliated with the Ministry of Foreign Affairs. It was founded in 2018, following the formation of the new government and after the dissolution of the now-defunct Ministry of European Union Affairs. The directorate is responsible for the accession process between the Republic of Turkey and the European Union. Deputy minister of foreign affairs, Faruk Kaymakcı served as the agency's president upon establishment in 2018.

== List of presidents ==
| No. | Name | Tenure | Age |
|---|---|---|---|
| 1 | Faruk Kaymakcı | August 2018 – March 2023 | 21 March 1968 (age 58) |
| 2 | Mehmet Kemal Bozay | March 2023 – present | 1966 (age 59–60) |
