= Egemen Bağış =

Turkish politician (born 1970)

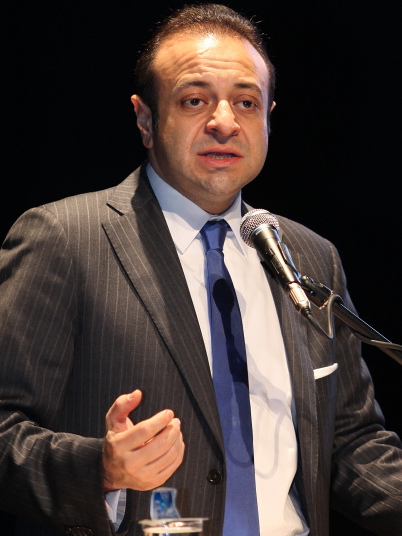

Minister of European Union Affairs
- In office 29 June 2011 – 25 December 2013
- Prime Minister: Recep Tayyip Erdoğan
- Preceded by: Position established
- Succeeded by: Mevlüt Çavuşoğlu

Chief Negotiator for Turkish Accession to the European Union
- In office 11 January 2009 – 25 December 2013
- Prime Minister: Recep Tayyip Erdoğan
- Preceded by: Ali Babacan
- Succeeded by: Mevlüt Çavuşoğlu

Member of the Grand National Assembly
- In office 19 November 2002 – 7 June 2015
- Constituency: İstanbul (II) (2002, 2007); İstanbul (I) (2011)

Personal details
- Born: 23 April 1970 (age 56) Bingöl, Turkey
- Party: Justice and Development Party
- Spouse: Beyhan N. Bağış
- Education: Baruch College
- Website: www.egemenbagis.com

Egemen Bağış (Turkish pronunciation: [eɟeˈmen baːˈɯʃ]) (born 23 April 1970) is a former Turkish politician of, former member of the Turkish parliament, the former minister for EU Affairs and chief negotiator of Turkey in accession talks with the European Union and a former ambassador of Turkey to the Czech Republic.

== Early life ==
Bağış was born in Bingöl, Turkey, in 1970 into a family which originated from Siirt. He holds a Bachelor of Arts degree in Human Resources Management as well as a Master of Public Administration, both from the Baruch College of City University of New York.

== Official responsibilities ==
- Turkish ambassador to the Czech Republic (Since November 2019)
- Member of the Turkish Parliament, representing Istanbul
- Chairman, Turkey-USA Inter Parliamentary Friendship Caucus of the Turkish Parliament
- Advisory Board Chairman, Istanbul 2010 European Capital of Culture Initiative.
- Honorary board member of the Siirt Solidarity Foundation.

As a top adviser to the Prime Minister Recep Tayyip Erdoğan, Bağış played a key role in the Justice and Development Party's (AKP) policies.

== Federation of Turkish American Associations ==
Bağış formerly served as the president of the Federation of Turkish American Associations, the New York-based umbrella organization of Turkish-Americans that sponsored his green card petition in the United States. He has also served as a member of the advisory board on Turkish Citizens Abroad, a government body. He was the manager of the Antik Bar at the Jolly Madison Hotel serving the Turkish American community. He also founded the Turkish Link, a New York-based translation agency specialized in the Turkish and English languages.

== Controversies ==
=== Protests of 2013 ===
During the 2013 protests in Turkey, Bağış attracted criticism for his comments that "Everyone who enters Taksim Square will be treated like a terrorist." In an officially published statement, and despite claims and evidence presented by organizations such as Amnesty International, Bağış claimed that "There is no state violence in Turkey". In the same statement, he claimed that "Turkey has the most reformist and strongest government in Europe and the most charismatic and strongest leader in the world. Should anyone have a problem with this, then I am truly sorry. Only for those who feel overwhelmed is the leadership of Prime Minister Erdoğan a problem."

Germany's Foreign Ministry summoned the Turkish ambassador to protest after Bağış accused German Chancellor Angela Merkel of "picking on" Turkey for domestic political gain before German elections, after Merkel criticized the crackdown as "much too strong". The accusation came after Germany blocked a decision to move forward the membership negotiations after the crackdown. Bağış said that if Merkel is looking for "internal political material" ahead of Germany's September elections, "this should not be Turkey". He also pointed to the election defeat last year of then-French President Nicolas Sarkozy, a fellow opponent of Turkish EU membership.

=== "Masturbation" remark ===
In January 2013 Bağış compared the campaign to recognize the Assyrian genocide and Armenian genocide in Sweden to "masturbation" . He later apologised for his remark.

=== Corruption scandal ===
As part of claims that Bağış, along with 3 other ministers, engaged in severely corrupt conduct, Bağış was the only one out of the four charged ministers who had not resigned on 25 December 2013. Despite Bağış claiming innocence, that evening, Prime Minister Erdoğan announced a major cabinet reshuffle, removing Bağış from his post as the Minister for European Union through his publicly unannounced official resignation.

=== Mocking the Quran ===
Voice recordings of Bağış mocking the Quran, particularly Surah Al-Baqarah, were leaked. This caused major controversy. Bağış claimed that he never said such things, but the voice recordings were later proven to be authentic. Turkish religious leader Ahmet Mahmut Ünlü criticised Bağış, stating "He mocked Surah Al Baqarah, they [AK Party] still talk with him, sit and laugh with him. I wouldn't even look at his face, even if they gave me the whole world."

== 2019 - present ==
In November 2019 Bağış was appointed Ambassador of Turkey to the Czech Republic. He served in Prague until November 2024, when he was succeeded by Metin Feyzioğlu. During his tenure Bağış was involved in efforts to develop Turkish-Czech relations, in June 2024 a Czech-Turkish cooperation park was inaugurated in Prague following diplomatic efforts involving the Turkish embassy. After leaving his ambassadorial post, Bağış continued to participate in international and diplomatic forums. In April 2025 he participated in a meeting of the high level Advisory Council of the United Nations Alliance of Civilizations in Marrakech. He also participated in discussions on Turkish European Union relations and international affairs at events in Europe.

In May 2026, the Center for Asia-Pacific Studies (CAPS) at CEVRO University in Prague announced Bağış appointment to its advisory board. According to CAPS he continued to cooperate with the Turkish Ministry of Foreign Affairs, represented Turkey at selected international institutions and forums, and served as a member of the high level Advisory Council of the United Nations Alliance of Civilizations.

== See also ==
- 2013 corruption scandal in Turkey
