= Volkan Bozkır =

President of the 75th UN General Assembly

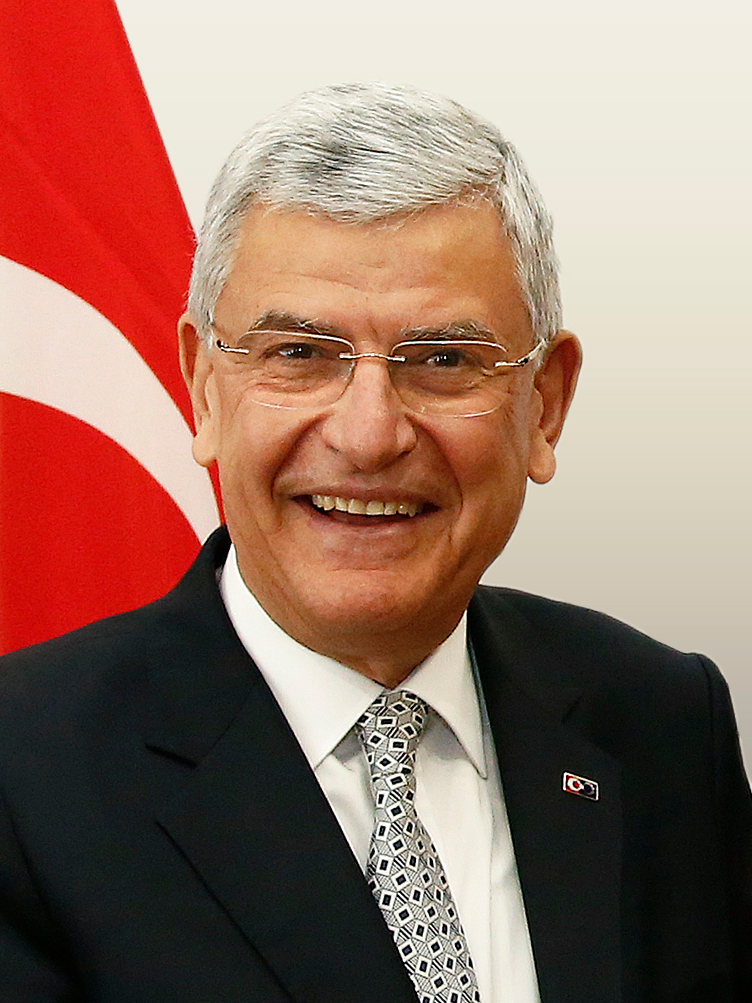
- Bozkır in 2016

President of the 75th UN General Assembly
- In office 16 September 2020 – 14 September 2021
- Preceded by: Tijjani Muhammad-Bande
- Succeeded by: Abdulla Shahid

Minister of European Union Affairs
- In office 24 November 2015 – 24 May 2016
- Prime Minister: Ahmet Davutoğlu
- Deputy: Ali Şahin
- Preceded by: Beril Dedeoğlu
- Succeeded by: Ömer Çelik
- In office 29 August 2014 – 28 August 2015
- Prime Minister: Ahmet Davutoğlu
- Deputy: Alaattin Büyükkaya
- Preceded by: Mevlüt Çavuşoğlu
- Succeeded by: Ali Haydar Konca

Chief Negotiator for Turkish Accession to the European Union
- In office 29 August 2014 – 28 August 2015
- Prime Minister: Ahmet Davutoğlu
- Preceded by: Mevlüt Çavuşoğlu
- Succeeded by: Beril Dedeoğlu

Member of the Grand National Assembly
- In office 12 June 2011 – 14 May 2023
- Constituency: İstanbul (II) (2011, June 2015, Nov 2015, 2018)

Permanent Representative of Turkey to the European Union
- In office 15 December 2005 – 21 October 2009
- President: Ahmet Necdet Sezer; Abdullah Gül
- Preceded by: Oğuz Demiralp
- Succeeded by: Selim Kuneralp

Ambassador of Turkey to Romania
- In office 23 August 1996 – 17 August 2000
- President: Süleyman Demirel; Ahmet Necdet Sezer
- Preceded by: Yaman Başkut
- Succeeded by: Ömer Zeytinoğlu

Personal details
- Born: 22 November 1950 (age 75) Ankara, Turkey
- Party: Justice and Development Party (AKP)
- Spouse: Nazlı Bozkır
- Children: 2
- Education: Ankara University

Volkan Bozkır (born 22 November 1950) is a Turkish diplomat and politician who served as the President of the United Nations General Assembly from 2020 to 2021. He served as Minister for European Union Affairs from November 2015 to May 2016 and previously held the same office from August 2014 to August 2015. He concurrently served as the Chief Negotiator for Turkish Accession to the European Union during the same time.

He was elected as the president of The United Nations General Assembly on 17 June 2020 for the 75th session, becoming the first-ever Turkish diplomat to hold this position.

== Early life and education ==
Volkan Bozkır was born in Ankara, Turkey. He graduated from Faculty of Law at the Ankara University. He speaks fluent English and French.

== Career ==
He has served as a Member of Parliament for İstanbul's second electoral district since the 2011 general election. Volkan Bozkır is a career diplomat and a defendant of the Turkish position regarding the Armenian genocide but also its anti-terror laws. While being the Turkish Minister for the European Union (EU) and also the leading negotiator in the Turkish accession talks to the EU denied there existed an Armenian genocide. After the EU issued a draft for the Turkey progress report in 2015 including a demand that Turkey accepts that there existed an Armenian genocide, he declared that Turkey wouldn't answer an EU report containing the term genocide. Also in 2015, he criticized Pope Francis for including the term Genocide in a sermon he held in a mass at the St. Peter's Basilica in Rome. As the EU demanded that Turkey adapts its anti-terror regulations according to EU normatives. Bozkır opposed the demand stating the anti terror laws regulations are already in line with the EU demands. As the EU Parliament voted for the accession talks to be suspended in march 2019, Bozkır, as the head of committee for foreign affairs in the Grand National Assembly of Turkey condemned the vote.

On the 17 June 2020, he was elected as the president of the 75th General Assembly of the United Nations, which is to take place September 2020 as the sole candidate with unanimous support from the 178 UN member states that were present in voting that was conducted by secret ballot. Armenia, Greece and Cyprus, while initially supportive, decided later to oppose the candidacy, allegedly due to diplomatic conflicts.

== Timeline of career ==
Function	Office	Year
Vice-consul	General Consulate in Stuttgart, Germany	1975–1978
Second Secretary & First Secretary	Embassy in Baghdad, Iraq	1978–1980
Chief of Section	Bilateral Economic Department	1980–1982
First Secretary & Counselor	Permanent Delegation to the OECD in Paris	1982–1986
Deputy Head of Department	Multilateral Economic Affairs	1986–1987
Foreign Policy Advisor	Prime Minister Turgut Özal's Office	1987–1989
Consul General	New York, United States	1989–1992
Chief of Cabinet & Chief Foreign Policy Advisor	President Turgut Özal & President Süleyman Demirel	1992–1996
Ambassador	Bucharest, Romania	1996–2000
Deputy Secretary General for EU Affairs	Ministry of Foreign Affairs	2000–2003
Deputy Under Secretary	Ministry of Foreign Affairs	2003–2005
Ambassador	Permanent Representative of Turkey to the European Union	2005–2009
Secretary General for EU Affairs	Ministry of Foreign Affairs	2009–2011
Minister of EU Affairs	Ministry of EU Affairs	2014–2016
President of the 75th UN General Assembly	United Nations headquarters in New York City	2020–2021

== Honours and medals ==
Ribbon bar	Award or decoration	Country	Date	Place	Note	Ref.
	Order of the Star of Romania	Romania	1999	Bucharest	The Order of The Star is the highest civil decoration of Romania.	
	Knight of Order of Merit of the Italian Republic	Italy	2 June 2014	Ankara	The Order of Merit is the highest ranking honour of the Republic of Italy.	
	Crescent of Pakistan	Pakistan	28 May 2021	Islamabad	Second highest civilian award of Pakistan	

== Criticism ==
Bozkır caused controversy in 2014 when he reported during a press conference that Turkey would no longer participate in the Eurovision Song Contest after Conchita Wurst's victory in Eurovision Song Contest 2014. On September 5 the General Manager of TRT, İbrahim Şahin, officially announced that Turkey would not return to Eurovision Song Contest 2015 in Vienna. Bozkır's comments during the press conference included "Each time I look at the Austrian who won the Eurovision Song Contest, I say 'Thankfully, we're not participating in this contest anymore.'"

Pakistan, in May 2021, conferred its second highest civilian award Hilal-e-Pakistan to Volkan Bozkir when he was the visiting UN General Assembly President. During his visit to Pakistan, Volkan Bozkir said that it was Pakistan's duty to raise the Jammu and Kashmir dispute in the United Nations "more strongly" and also that there was a lack of political will to find a resolution to the Kashmir dispute compared to the Palestinian issue, even though both have been festering for an equally long period." A day later, the Ministry of External Affairs of India expressed strong opposition to Bozkir's remarks stating that "When an incumbent President of the UN General Assembly makes misleading and prejudiced remarks, he does great disservice to the office he occupies. The PGA's behaviour is truly regrettable and surely diminishes his standing on the global platform,"

== Notes ==
Diplomatic posts
Preceded by Tijjani Muhammad-Bande	President of the United Nations General Assembly; 2020–2021	Succeeded by Abdulla Shahid
