= Saruhan Oluç =

Turkish politician (born 1958)

Saruhan Oluç MP
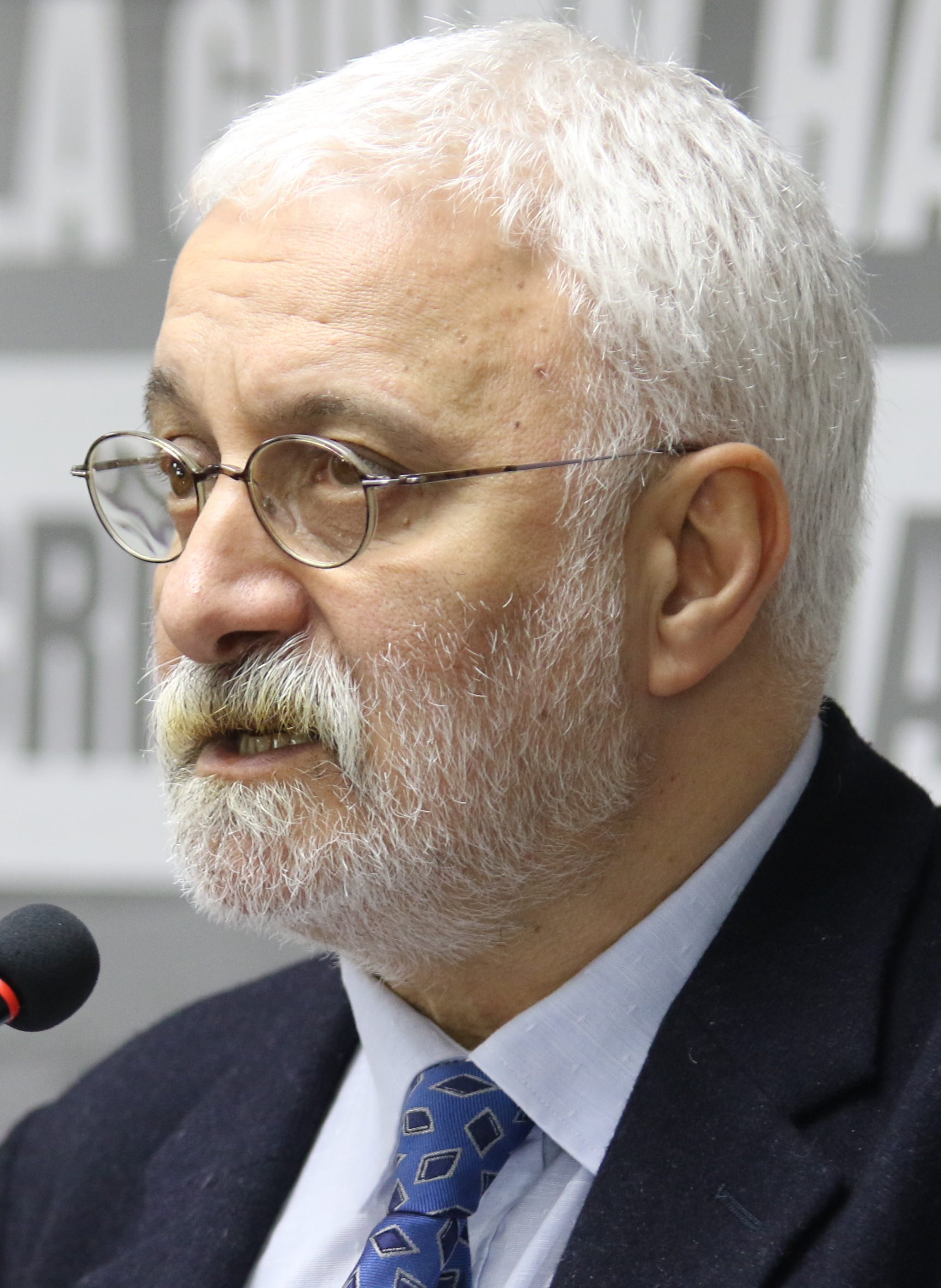

Member of the Grand National Assembly
- Incumbent
- Assumed office 7 June 2018
- Constituency: İstanbul (III) (2018); Antalya (2023)
- In office 23 June 2015 – 1 November 2015
- Constituency: Antalya (June 2015)

Personal details
- Born: Hakkı Saruhan Oluç; 14 January 1958 (age 68) Istanbul, Turkey
- Party: HDP (2012–2023); DEM Party (2023–present)
- Occupation: Journalist, Politician

Hakkı Saruhan Oluç (born 14 January 1958, Istanbul, Turkey) is a Turkish politician and engineer, a former member and founder of the Freedom and Solidarity Party (ÖDP) and current member of the Grand National Assembly of Turkey for the Peoples' Democratic Party (HDP).

== Early life and education ==
He was born in Istanbul in 1958 and pursued his studies in Aachen, Germany, where he graduated from the University of Rhine-Westphalia in mechanical engineering. Following his return to Turkey, he was a contributor to a Turkish encyclopedia focusing on socialist issues and a journalist for the left-wing BirGün.

== Political career ==
He supported the Thousand Hopes candidates in 2007 and also the Labour, Democracy and Freedom Bloc in the 2011 elections. He was elected to the Turkish parliament representing Antalya for the Peoples Democratic Party (HDP) in the general election of June 2015 but not re-elected in the snap elections in November 2015. He was elected into the Turkish parliament again in the parliamentary elections of 2018, this time representing Istanbul. In July 2018, he was elected the speaker of the HDP, succeeding Ayhan Bilgen.

=== Political positions ===
He opposes the presidential system introduced by Recep Tayyip Erdogan and criticized the attempts to close the HDP by Devlet Bahçeli, the leader of the Nationalist Movement Party (MHP). Besides he is demands a political solution for the Kurdish and Alevi population in Turkey and sees the attempts to abolish the presidential system in Turkey by the opposition parties led by the Republican People's Party {CHP} as insufficient. In January 2022, he was involved in talks regarding the creation of a Democratic Alliance with parties not represented in parliament for the next electoral campaign.
