= Beril Dedeoğlu =

Turkish academic and politician

Hatice Beril Dedeoğlu
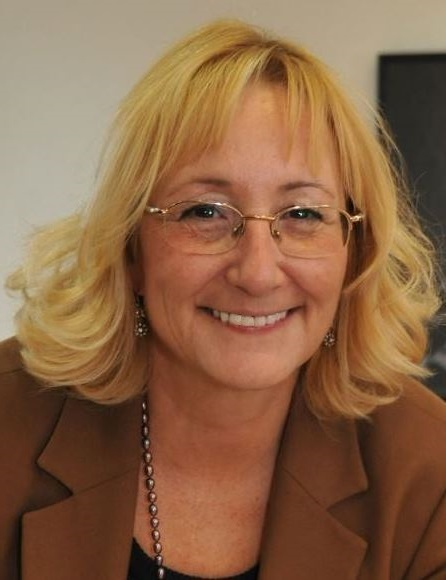

Minister of European Union Affairs
- In office 22 September 2015 – 17 November 2015
- Prime Minister: Ahmet Davutoğlu
- Preceded by: Ali Haydar Konca
- Succeeded by: Volkan Bozkır

Chief Negotiator for Turkish Accession to the European Union
- In office 22 September 2015 – 17 November 2015
- Prime Minister: Ahmet Davutoğlu
- Preceded by: Volkan Bozkır
- Succeeded by: Volkan Bozkır

Personal details
- Born: 9 December 1961 Ankara, Turkey
- Died: 13 March 2019 (aged 57)
- Party: Independent
- Education: Istanbul University
- Occupation: Academic, journalist
- Cabinet: 63rd

Hatice Beril Dedeoğlu (9 December 1961 – 13 March 2019) was a Turkish academic who served as the Minister of European Union Affairs in the interim election government led by Prime Minister Ahmet Davutoğlu between 22 September and 17 November 2015. Having taken over from the previous interim cabinet minister Ali Haydar Konca following his resignation, Dedeoğlu served until Davutoğlu formed a new government after the November 2015 snap general election. She was, as required by the Constitution, of no political affiliation and was one of two women to serve in the interim cabinet, the other being Family and Social Policy Minister Ayşen Gürcan.

As the Minister of European Union Affairs, Dedeoğlu concurrently served as the Chief Negotiator representing Turkey during the EU accession negotiations.

== Early life and career ==
Hatice Beril Dedeoğlu was born in Ankara in 1961 and graduated from Galatasaray High School in Istanbul. She later graduated from the Department of International Relations in the Istanbul University Faculty of Economics. Besides her academic career, she works as a columnist on international relations for the Star and Today's Zaman newspapers, having previously worked for the newspapers Zaman, Agos and Yeni Şafak.

=== Academic career ===
Dedeoğlu began her career by working as an assistant to Professor Esat Çam and has worked in the Galatasaray University Department of International Relations since 1995. She became a docent in 1999 and a professor in 2005. In 2005, she was appointed to lead the International Relations Department of the Galatasaray University Faculty of Economics and Administrative Sciences. She briefly gave lectures at Kadir Has University and still gives lectures at Istanbul Aydın University and the Gaziantep Hasan Kalyoncu University. She has authored several books and journal articles and has appeared on several news programs on Samanyolu Haber and TRT Haber TV channels.

On 6 February 2012, she was appointed to the Council of Higher Education (YÖK) by President Abdullah Gül for a four-year term.

=== Solution process ===
In December 2012, the Justice and Development Party government of Turkey began a period of peace negotiations with the Kurdistan Workers' Party (PKK), a separatist terrorist organisation that has fought against the Turkish Armed Forces since the 1980s. The ceasefire and the subsequent negotiations were named the solution process and was designed to end the 40-year conflict in the south-eastern region of the country.

The solution process involved the establishment of a 'wise people committee', formed of academics and experts that were due to report on the ongoing developments in the south-east to the government during the negotiations. The committee, announced on 4 April 2013, was formed of representatives from all seven regions of Turkey. Dedeoğlu was appointed as the Vice Chairman of the delegation from the Central Anatolia Region. As a member of the wise-people committee, she participated and organised several conferences and visits to areas in the Central Anatolian Region for much of the first half of 2013.

== Minister of European Union Affairs ==
The general election held in June 2015 resulted in a hung parliament, with coalition negotiations eventually proving unsuccessful. As a result, President Recep Tayyip Erdoğan called a snap election for November 2015, thereby necessitating the formation of an interim election government as required by the Turkish Constitution. The interim election government, the first in Turkish history, was formed by Prime Minister Ahmet Davutoğlu, who sent out invitations to politicians from all parties to take part. Apart from Davutoğlu's Justice and Development Party (AKP), only the Peoples' Democratic Party (HDP) opted to take part, while the Republican People's Party (CHP) and the Nationalist Movement Party (MHP) declined their invitations.

Just under a month after taking office, both the HDP ministers taking part in the government resigned, leaving the positions of European Affairs Minister and Development Minister vacant. Dedeoğlu was appointed as the Minister of European Union Affairs, succeeding HDP Member of Parliament Ali Haydar Konca. As required by the Constitution, she was independent of any political party. As the Minister of European Union Affairs, Dedeoğlu concurrently served as the Chief Negotiator representing Turkey during the EU accession negotiations.

== Controversies ==
=== SOMA mine disaster ===
In May 2014, an explosion in a coal mine in the district of Soma in Manisa Province killed 301 miners, becoming Turkey's worst ever mine disaster. The opposition Republican People's Party (CHP) had presented a request in Parliament just two weeks before the disaster to investigate past mining disasters and incidents in several mines including Soma, with the motion being rejected by the government. Writing as a columnist in the pro-government newspaper Star after the disaster, Dedeoğlu authored a column criticising the CHP for putting forward such a motion, claiming such motions never prevented future disasters. She was criticised by opposition commentators for her article.

=== 'Parallel state' ===
It was observed that Dedeoğlu had been appointed as a cabinet minister by the AKP despite being a writer for the newspaper Today's Zaman, widely considered to be sympathetic to the Gülen Movement founded and led by exiled cleric Fethullah Gülen. The AKP government, as well as President Recep Tayyip Erdoğan, have referred to the movement as a 'parallel state' and a 'terrorist organisation', having been involved in a political conflict with Gülen Movement supporters in high bureaucratic offices whom they accused of attempting to establish 'a state within a state'. Numerous police raids have since been conducted on the Zaman newspaper and other Gülen Movement affiliated establishments, such as Bank Asya and Samanyolu TV. Dedeoğlu's appointment thus came as a surprise to the opposition media.

== Death ==
Beril Dedeoğlu died on 13 March 2019, following a brain hemorrhage two weeks earlier. She was 57.

== See also ==
- Ministry of European Union Affairs
- Higher education in Turkey
- Women in Turkish politics
