= Mustafa Akaydın =

Turkish politician

Mustafa Akaydın MP
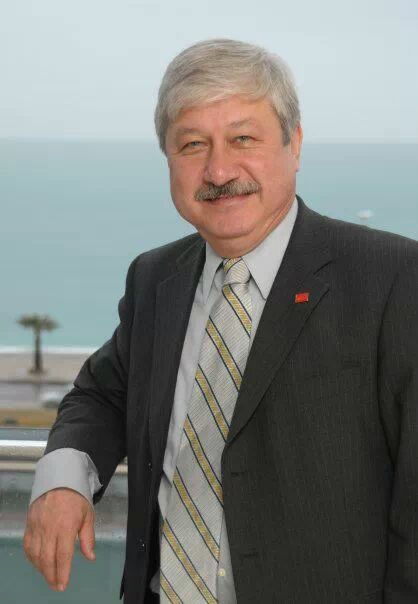

Member of the Grand National Assembly
- Incumbent
- Assumed office 7 June 2015
- Constituency: Antalya (June 2015)

Mayor of Antalya
- In office 29 March 2009 – 30 March 2014
- Preceded by: Menderes Türel
- Succeeded by: Menderes Türel

Personal details
- Born: 24 April 1952 (age 74) Çorum
- Party: CHP
- Education: Hacettepe University
- Occupation: Surgeon

Mustafa Akaydın (born 24 April 1952, in Çorum) is a Turkish politician of the Republican People's Party (CHP), who served as the mayor of Antalya, Turkey. Prior to his political career, Akaydın held positions as a professor, general surgeon and a rector of Akdeniz University.

== Early life and academic career ==
Mustafa Akaydın was born in 1952 and received his primary and secondary education in Ankara and Istanbul. He graduated from the Hacettepe University Faculty of Medicine in 1975.

Akaydın became a General Surgery Specialist at the Ankara University Medical Science Faculty in 1979. In 1980, he became a lecturer at Akdeniz University. In the following years, he became associate professor in 1984 and then professor in 1992. He also participated in a one-year training in Germany and the United States, in organ transplants and breast surgery.

From 1988 to 1990, Akaydın served as chairman of the Antalya Chamber of Doctors.

Akaydın worked as vice-rector of Akdeniz University from 1996 until 2004, and later as rector from 2004 to 2008. As rector, he took a firm stance on the university's headscarf ban. He also served on the Inter-University Committee between the years of 2000 and 2008, becoming the committee's chairman in the last two years of his membership.

== Politics ==
On 1 December 2008 Akaydın entered politics. He stood in the 2009 local elections as a candidate of the Republican People's Party, winning the mayorship of Antalya with 42.34% of the vote. He succeeded Menderes Türel of the Justice and Development Party (AKP).

=== Term as mayor ===
Antalya's bus drivers contributed strongly to Akaydın's March 2009 election victory. Akaydın had also promised to introduce a new electronic public transportation card system known as "Halk Kart", to replace the "Antkart" system introduced by his predecessor, Menderes Türel. However, The new system brought by Akaydın was considered too expensive by local people.

Antalya lost its host spot in the 2010 FIBA World Championship to Kayseri, when a shortage of funds halted construction of the necessary facilities. Some locals and city authorities felt the decision was politically motivated, as Akaydın's election was a defeat for the ruling Justice and Development Party, and Kayseri is the hometown of Turkish president Abdullah Gül.

Akaydın solved the serious sewage collection and disposal problem in Antalya, which involved construction of a new disposal center near Hurma. This center also produces electricity in order to reduce energy spending.

=== Defeat ===
Menderes Türel won back the Antalya mayorship in the tense 2014 elections, by a margin of just over 23,000 votes. Following the elections, security forces discovered a number of official documents being burnt, and Türel accused Akaydın of being responsible. After taking office, Türel launched a corruption investigation, which included a raid on Akaydın's home.

== Personal life ==
Akaydın is married, and he has two children and one grandchild.
