= Ömer Çelik =

Turkish journalist and politician (born 1968)

Ömer Çelik MP
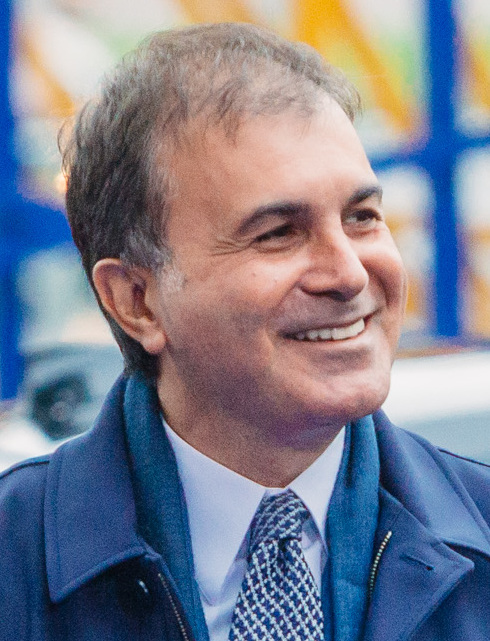

Minister of European Union Affairs
- In office 24 May 2016 – 9 July 2018
- Prime Minister: Binali Yıldırım
- Preceded by: Volkan Bozkır
- Succeeded by: office abolished

Chief Negotiator for Turkish Accession to the European Union
- In office 24 May 2016 – 9 May 2018
- Prime Minister: Binali Yıldırım
- Preceded by: Volkan Bozkır
- Succeeded by: office abolished

Minister of Culture and Tourism
- In office 24 January 2013 – 28 August 2015
- Prime Minister: Recep Tayyip Erdoğan; Ahmet Davutoğlu
- Preceded by: Ertuğrul Günay
- Succeeded by: Yalçın Topçu

Member of the Grand National Assembly
- Incumbent
- Assumed office 2 June 2023
- Constituency: Adana (2023)
- In office 1 November 2015 – 24 June 2018
- Constituency: Adana (Nov 2015)
- In office 3 November 2002 – 7 June 2015
- Constituency: Adana (2002, 2007, 2011)

Personal details
- Born: 15 June 1968 (age 58) Adana, Turkey
- Party: Justice and Development Party (AKP)
- Education: Gazi University
- Profession: Journalist, politician

Ömer Çelik (born 15 June 1968) is a Turkish journalist and politician. Between 24 January 2013 and 28 August 2015 he served as Minister of Culture and Tourism. He served as the Minister of European Union Affairs and as the Chief Negotiator for Turkish Accession to the European Union between 2016–2018.

== Early years ==
He was born on 15 June 1968 in Adana to Ziya Çelik and his wife Dudu. After graduating from Gazi University's Faculty of Economics and Administrative Sciences, he earned his master's degree in political science at the same university's Graduate School of Social Sciences.

Ömer Çelik worked as a journalist and political scientist. He joined the Justice and Development Party (AKP) and became political advisor to the party leader.

== Politics ==
He was elected to Parliament as a deputy from Adana for three consecutive terms in 2002, 2007 and 2011. Since 2010, he has served as the Deputy Chairman responsible for Foreign Affairs. He is also the chairman of the Friendship Group of Bilateral Parliamentary Relations between Turkey and the United States.

On 24 January 2013 Ömer Çelik was appointed Minister of Culture and Tourism in the cabinet of Recep Tayyip Erdoğan replacing Ertuğrul Günay.

== Controversies ==
His positions have periodically attracted criticism, particularly in relation to domestic political polarization, turkey's foreign policy and the Kurdish issue. As the justice and development party spokesperson, he has frequently defended the policies of President Recep Tayyip Erdoğan and the governing party in public disputes with opposition politicians.

Çelik has been a prominent participant in disputes between the AK party and the Republican People's Party (CHP). In 2026 the criticized CHP politicians and rejected allegations concerning the government's involvement in judicial proceeding affecting the CHP, characterizing the matter as an internal issue of the opposition party. Opposition parties and politicians, however, characterized the judicial intervention against the CHP leadership as politically motivated and damaging to democratic institutions.

His statement concerning Israel and the Gaza war have also generated political controversy. Çelik has repeatedly condemned Israeli military operations and described Israel's actions in Gaza in strongly critical terms. His statements from part of the AK party government's broader position on the conflict and have been accompanied by criticism of Israel's policies.

Çelik has likewise has been a spokesman for the government's position om the Kurdish issue and relations to the Kurdish political and armed groups in Syria. In August 2026, he welcomed the dissolution of the Kurdish led Syrian Democratic Forces (SDF) and its proposed integration into Syria's armed forces, describing the development as a step towards strengthening Syria's territorial integrity. The Turkish government's has been contested by Kurdish political actors, particularly regarding the future political and security status of Kurdish groups in Syria.

== Personal life ==
Ömer Çelik is single.
