= Ali Haydar Konca =

Turkish politician

Minister of European Union Affairs
- In office 28 August 2015 – 22 September 2015
- Prime Minister: Ahmet Davutoğlu
- Preceded by: Volkan Bozkır
- Succeeded by: Beril Dedeoğlu

Member of the Grand National Assembly
- In office 7 June 2015 – 1 November 2015
- Constituency: Kocaeli (June 2015)

Personal details
- Born: 1 February 1950 (age 76) Varto, Muş Province, Turkey
- Party: Peoples' Democratic Party (HDP)
- Education: Ankara University
- Occupation: Politician
- Cabinet: 63rd

Ali Haydar Konca (born 1 February 1950) is a Turkish politician who served as the Minister of European Union Affairs and Chief Negotiator in the interim election government led by Ahmet Davutoğlu between 28 August and 22 September 2015. He served as a Member of Parliament for the electoral district of Kocaeli from June to November 2015. He is a member of the Peoples' Democratic Party (HDP) and is a former civil servant and Kaymakam (sub-governor).

== Early life and career ==
Ali Haydar Konca was born to Kurdish Alevi parents on 1 February 1950 in Varto, Muş Province. He graduated from Ankara University Faculty of Law and entered an exam to become a Kaymakam in 1972. He subsequently became the Entourage Officer of Elazığ and later served as the Kaymakam of numerous districts until the 1980 coup d'état. Two months after the coup, he returned to office as the Kaymakam of the districts of Hassa, Çüngüş and Sürmene. He was later appointed as the Manager of Legal Affairs to the Governor of Kocaeli. He later resigned from this position to become a freelance lawyer.

Konca is a member of the High Education Association, Association of Contemporary Lawyers and the Kocaeli Vartoians Association. He is an honorary member of the Kocaeli Medical Chamber.

== Political career ==
Konca was elected as a municipal councillor from the Social Democratic Populist Party (SHP) in the 1989 local elections. However, he later resigned from his position and his party.

In the June 2015 general election, Konca became the top candidate on the Peoples' Democratic Party (HDP) Kocaeli list. He was elected after the overseas votes (in which the HDP achieved almost double their nationwide vote share) were added to the vote tally in Kocaeli, resulting in the MHP losing a seat and the HDP gaining a seat.

Konca lost his seat in the November 2015 general election, in which he stood again as the HDP's first preference candidate in Kocaeli.

=== Minister of European Union Affairs ===
Konca was one of the three HDP Members of Parliament offered a role in the interim election government that was formed by Prime Minister Ahmet Davutoğlu after President Recep Tayyip Erdoğan called for a new election in November 2015. The HDP, with 80 MPs in Parliament, was entitled to three Ministries in the interim election government, which will oversee the November 2015 election. In the ministerial appointments confirmed on 28 August 2015, Konca was appointed as the Minister of European Union Affairs and concurrently serves as the Chief Negotiator in the Turkish EU membership negotiations.

While serving as a Minister, Ali Haydar Konca stated that in 1915, a massacre of Armenians took place in what it known as the Armenian genocide. Konca was subsequently prosecuted for allegedly spreading a libelous and hateful message.

=== Resignation ===
On 22 September 2015, Konca and the other HDP cabinet minister Müslüm Doğan submitted their resignations to Prime Minister Ahmet Davutoğlu, who accepted and stated that he would appoint their replacements as a matter of urgency. In a press conference shortly after submitting their resignations, the two ministers stated that they had resigned due to disagreements in the interim election cabinet and accused the AKP of ignoring the democratic will of the people to instead create a 'concept of war' in the south-east. They also condemned the AKP's involvement in the dissolution of the Solution process between the government and the Kurdistan Workers Party (PKK) and accused President Recep Tayyip Erdoğan of violating the Constitution during the government-forming process.

Konca was succeeded as European Union Affairs Minister by academic Beril Dedeoğlu.

== See also ==
- List of Turkish civil servants
