= Ministry of European Union Affairs (Turkey) =

Former government ministry of Turkey

- Avrupa Birliği Bakanlığı
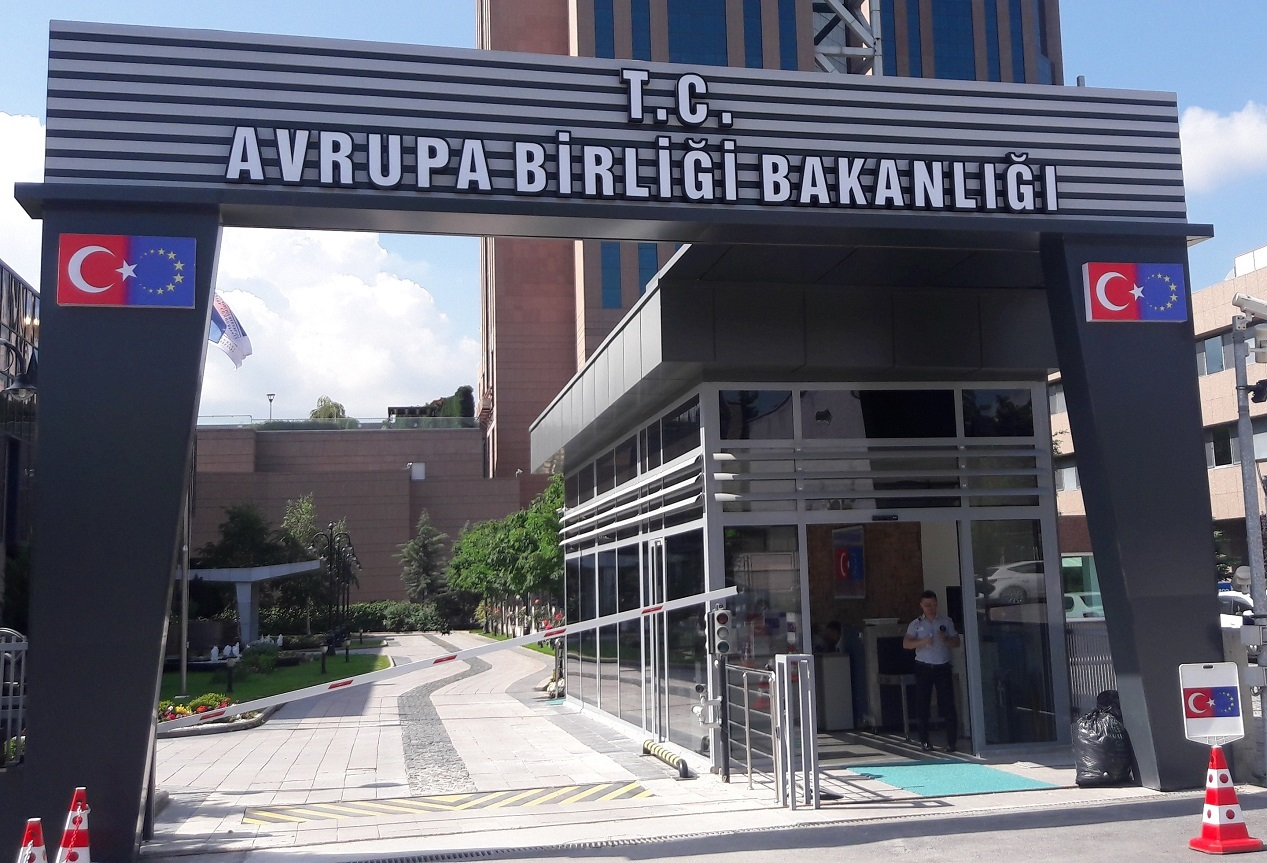
- Entrance to the headquarters

Agency overview
- Formed: 29 June 2011
- Preceding agency: General Secretariat of the European Union
- Dissolved: July 10, 2018
- Superseding agency: Directorate for EU Affairs
- Jurisdiction: Government of Turkey
- Annual budget: ₺291,238,000 (2015)
- Website: www.ab.gov.tr

The Ministry of European Union Affairs (Turkish: Avrupa Birliği Bakanlığı) was a ministry of the Turkish government responsible for the accession process between the Republic of Turkey and the European Union. Formed on June 29, 2011 after Prime Minister Recep Tayyip Erdoğan won a third term in the 2011 general election. The ministry was responsible for co-ordinating negotiations and accession projects throughout the 81 provinces of Turkey to develop relations between Turkey and the European Union. The minister responsible concurrently served as the chief negotiator during the accession process. The Minister concurrently served as the chief negotiator during accession talks with the EU.

== History ==
The ministry was established after the governing Justice and Development Party won a third term in the general election of 2011, in time for the 61st government of Turkey. Previously, European Union negotiations were handled by the Minister of Foreign Affairs.

The ministry has been headed by six ministers in the past, namely Egemen Bağış (2011–2013), Mevlüt Çavuşoğlu (2013–2014), Volkan Bozkır (2014 – August 2015 and again from November 2015 to 2016), Ali Haydar Konca (August–September 2015), Beril Dedeoğlu (September–November 2015) and Ömer Çelik, in office from 24 May 2016 onwards.

Following the declaration of the new government after the presidential election in 2018, the ministry was dissolved, and it was replaced by the Directorate for EU Affairs, a sub-unit of the Ministry of Foreign Affairs.

== Organisation ==
The Ministry of European Union Affairs operated the following 16 directorates in 2015:

Directorate	Administration	
Directorate	Management	Position
Directorate for Political Affairs	Ege Erkoçak	Director
Directorate for Accession Policy	Elif Kurşunlu	Director
Directorate of Sectoral Policies	Aylin Çağlayan Özcan	Director
Directorate of Social, Regional and Innovative Policies	Kayhan Özüm	Director
Directorate of Economic and Financial Policies	Aylin Sakızlıoğlu	Director
Directorate of Single Market and Competition	Lale Çelik	Director
Directorate of Agriculture and Fisheries	Gökhan Aralan	Director
Directorate of Financial Cooperation	Beyza Turan	Director
Directorate of Civil Society, Communication and Culture	Anıl Turpçu	Director
Directorate of Project Implementation	Bülent Özcan	Director
Directorate of European Union Law	Özlen Üstün Kavalalı	Director
Directorate of Translation Coordination	İlksen Hilâl Tanrıkurt	Director
Directorate of Training and Institution Building	Osman Düzel	Director
Directorate of Research and Documentation	Selçuk Bayraktaroğlu	Director
Directorate of Administrative Services	Mehmet Nuri Erikel; İhsan Kaan Erkman; Mustafa Yılmaz	Director; Head of Department; Head of Department
Department of Strategic Development	Bengül Gökcan	Head of Department

== List of ministers of European Union affairs ==
Between 2011 and 2018, six Ministers were responsible for this department.

#	Image	Minister	Term start	Term end	Party	Government
1		Egemen Bağış (1970– )	29 June 2011	25 December 2013	Justice and Development Party	61st
2		Mevlüt Çavuşoğlu (1968– )	25 December 2013	29 August 2014	Justice and Development Party	61st
3		Volkan Bozkır (1950– )	29 August 2014	28 August 2015	Justice and Development Party	62nd
4		Ali Haydar Konca (1950– )	28 August 2015	22 September 2015	Peoples' Democratic Party	63rd
5		Beril Dedeoğlu (1961–2019)	22 September 2015	17 November 2015	Independent	63rd
(3)		Volkan Bozkır (1950– )	24 November 2015	24 May 2016	Justice and Development Party	64th
6		Ömer Çelik (1968– )	24 May 2016	9 July 2018	Justice and Development Party	65th
