= Menderes Türel =

Turkish politician (born 1964)

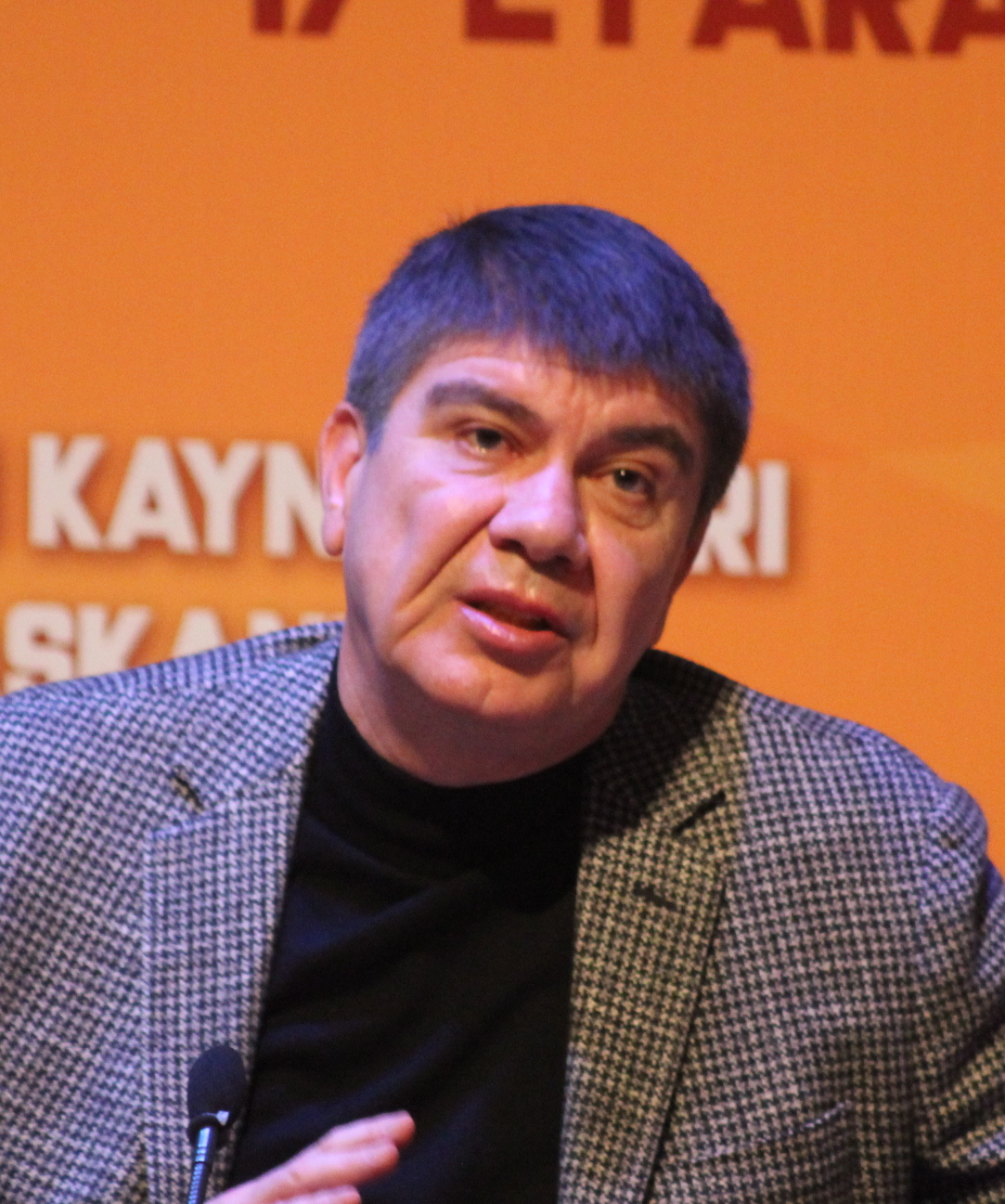
Türel in 2018

Menderes Mehmet Tevfik Türel (born 11 July 1964, in Antalya, Turkey) is a Turkish politician of the Justice and Development Party (AKP). He was the mayor of Antalya from 29 March 2004 until March 2009, and once again from 30 March 2014 to 8 April 2019.

When Menderes Turel was first elected, in the 2004 local elections, he was among the youngest metropolitan mayors of Turkey.

Born into a family from Antalya, he served for many years as a member of Antalya Chamber of Trade and Industry (ATSO). Much of his working life has been spent at the printing house of the Yeni Ileri newspaper owned by his family.

Türel emphasized during his election campaign that Antalya should become a world brand like major world cities. He regarded infrastructure as the most important problem of the city. The performance that Türel made after taking office was well received by the citizens of Antalya according to the results of public opinion polls.

His successor Mustafa Akaydın criticized Türel's performance as mayor, saying, "The Antalya Municipality has debt to the tune of 400 million Turkish liras. The underpass-based infrastructure investments and tram project are full of technical mistakes."

Menderes Turel has been criticized by environmentalists due to the constructions of big hotels and resorts in the natural areas of Antalya during his time. Among others, one of the big hotels was constructed by Cengiz Holding, i.e. the company linked to the 2013 corruption scandal in Turkey. This hotel was sold to the Rixos Hotel Group in 2009, where Turel was working as a chief consultant in 2009.
