= List of international presidential trips made by Abdullah Gül =

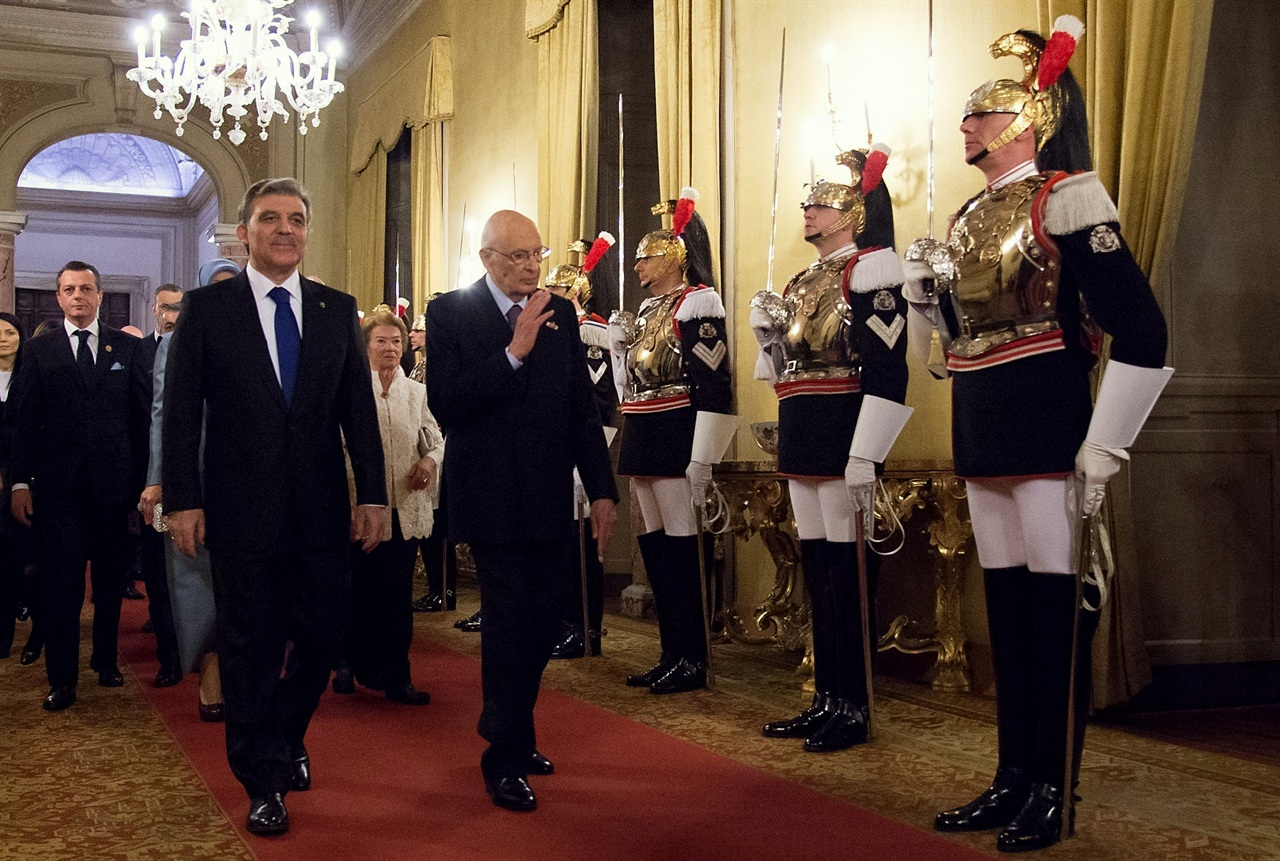
President Gul and Italian President Giorgio Napolitano during the official state visit at Quirinal Palace, 29 January 2014

This is a list of presidential trips made by Abdullah Gül, the 11th President of Republic of Turkey. During his presidency, which began with his inauguration on August 28, 2007, Abdullah Gül has travelled to 63 different states internationally as of February 2014.

== Summary of international trips ==
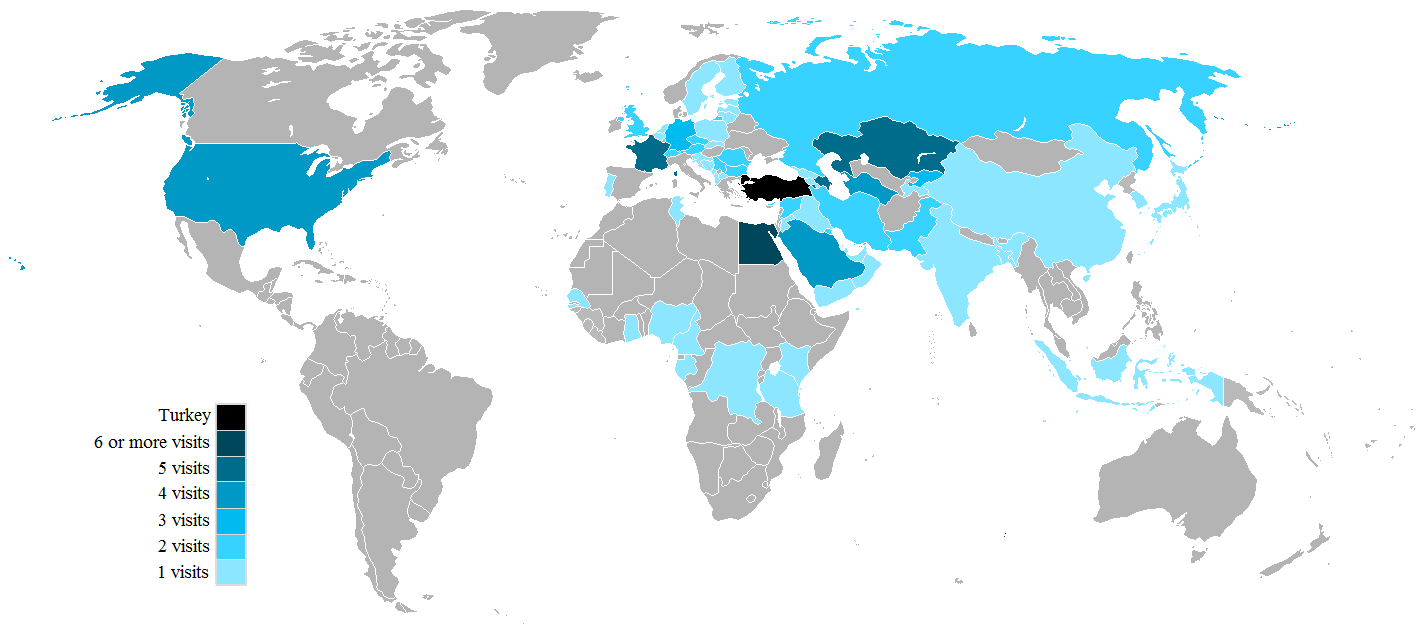
Map of international trips made by Abdullah Gül as president

Number of visits	Country
1 visit	Albania, Armenia, Bahrain, Bangladesh, Belgium, Bosnia and Herzegovina, Cameroon, China, Croatia, DR Congo, Estonia, Finland, Gabon, Georgia, Ghana, Hungary, India, Indonesia, Iraq, Italy, Japan, Jordan, Kenya, Latvia, Lithuania, Republic of Macedonia, Montenegro, Netherlands, Nigeria, Oman, Poland, Portugal, Qatar, Senegal, Slovakia, Slovenia, South Korea, Sweden, Tajikistan, Tanzania, Tunisia, United Arab Emirates, Yemen
2 visits	Austria, Bulgaria, Czech Republic, Iran, Kuwait, Kyrgyzstan, Northern Cyprus, Pakistan, Romania, Russia, Serbia, Switzerland, Syria, United Kingdom
3 visits	Germany
4 visits	Saudi Arabia, Turkmenistan, United States
5 visits	Azerbaijan, France, Kazakhstan
6 visits	Egypt

== 2007 ==
The following international trips were made by Abdullah Gül during 2007:

Country	Areas visited	Date(s)	Notes
Northern Cyprus	North Nicosia	September 18	See also: Embassy of Turkey to the Turkish Republic of Northern Cyprus State visit Details Abdullah Gül made his first visit abroad to the Turkish Republic of Northern Cyprus as president. Gül met with President Mehmet Ali Talat.
France	Strasbourg	October 2–4	See also: Accession of Turkey to the European Union Details President Abdullah Gül addressed the Parliamentary Assembly of the Council of Europe. Gül met with President René van der Linden and senior officials
Azerbaijan	Baku	November 6	See also: Azerbaijan–Turkey relations State visit Details President Abdullah Gül and his wife Hayrünnisa Gül made a state visit to Azerbaijan. In this context, Gül met with President Ilham Aliyev and Prime Minister Artur Rasizade. Also he delivered a speech to the National Assembly of Azerbaijan.
Georgia	Tbilisi	November 20–21	See also: Georgia–Turkey relations Details President Gül was attending with Azerbaijani President İlham Aliyev foundation laying ceremony for the Kars–Tbilisi–Baku railway line and before, met with Georgian President Mikheil Saakashvili in Tbilisi
France	Paris	November 25	See also: France–Turkey relations Details Abdullah Gül addressed the General Assembly of the International Exhibitions Bureau (BIE) to promote the candidacy of İzmir for Expo 2015.
Pakistan	Islamabad	December 2–3	See also: Pakistan–Turkey relations State visit Details President Abdullah Gül paid an official visit to Pakistan, with the invitation of the President of the Pakistan, Pervez Musharraf. Also, Mr. Gül received leading Pakistani politicians including Benazir Bhutto and Nawaz Sharif.
Turkmenistan	Ashgabat	December 5–7	State visit Details President Abdullah Gül made a state visit to Turkmenistan. Gül met with counterpart Gurbanguly Berdimuhamedow and Turkish citizens and businessmen living in Ashgabat
Kazakhstan	Astana, Almaty	December 12–15	See also: Kazakhstan–Turkey relations State visit Details President Gül met with President Nursultan Nazarbayev. He was attended celebrating Kazakhstan's independence day and toured around a selection of facilities and organizations run by Turkish entrepreneurs in Almaty.

== 2008 ==
The following international trips were made by Abdullah Gül during 2008:

Country	Areas visited	Date(s)	Notes
United States	Washington, D.C. New York City	January 7–11	See also: Turkey–United States relations State visit Details President Gül made an official visit to the United States at the invitation of U.S. President George W. Bush and he held talks with American press, non-governmental organizations and Turkish community in the Washington, D.C. and New York City
Egypt	Cairo, Alexandria	January 14–16	See also: Egypt–Turkey relations State visit Details Gul made official a trip to Egypt at the invitation of President Hosni Mubarak. Furthermore, Abdullah Gül made a speech at the Turkish-Egyptian Business Forum and visited Bibliotheca Alexandrina.
Syria	Damascus	January 19	See also: Syria–Turkey relations Details President Abdullah Gül paid a one-day visit to Syria for Damascus Arab Capital of Culture.
Qatar	Doha	February 5–7	See also: Qatar–Turkey relations State visit Details Abdullah Gül paid an official visit to Qatar with the invitation of the Emir of the Qatar, Hamad bin Khalifa Al Thani.
Romania	Bucharest	March 2–4	See also: Romania–Turkey relations State visit Details President Gül made an official state visit to Romania at the invitation of President Traian Băsescu. Mr. Gül held talks with President Basescu as well he received the Prime Minister, Chairman of the Parliament and Senate. Also, Gul was awarded with an honorary doctorate by Dimitrie Cantemir Christian University in Bucharest.
Senegal	Dakar	March 13–14	See also: Organisation of Islamic Cooperation Details President Gül attended the 11th Summit meeting of the Organization of the Islamic Cooperation (OIC) in Dakar, Senegal.
France	Paris	March 31	See also: France–Turkey relations Expo 2015 Details President Gül visited to Paris to give support to the candidate city of İzmir
Romania	Bucharest	April 2–4	See also: Romania–Turkey relations NATO summit Details President Abdullah Gül traveled to Bucharest, Romania to attend the 2008 Bucharest summit of NATO. Gül met with President Traian Băsescu. The President later attended a meeting of the North Atlantic Council, meeting with heads of government.
Republic of Macedonia	Skopje, Ohrid	May 1–3	See also: Republic of Macedonia–Turkey relations Ohrid Summit 2008 Details President Gül traveled to Republic of Macedonia to attend as the guest of honour the 15th Summit meeting of the presidents of Central European States in city of Ohrid. Mr. Gül met with President Branko Crvenkovski and other counterparts.
Japan	Tokyo, Kushimoto	June 3–8	See also: Japan–Turkey relations State visit Details Since the 1924 establishment of diplomatic relations between Turkey and Japan, for the first time a Turkish President visited to Japan. President Abdullah Gül and his wife Hayrünnisa Gül paid an official visit to Japan at the invitation of Imperial Majesty Emperor Akihito. Gül and Mrs. Gül met with Emperor Akihito and Empress Michiko at Imperial Palace.
Croatia	Zagreb, Dubrovnik	June 10–12	See also: Croatia–Turkey relations State visit Details President Gül and his wife Mrs. Gül made an official state visit to the Croatia at the invitation of Croatian President Stjepan Mesić.Two presidents discussed the developments in their bilateral relations as well as regional and international issues.After the meeting, Abdullah Gül and Mrs. Gül travelled to Croatia's historic city of Dubrovnik.
Kazakhstan	Astana	July 4–6	See also: Kazakhstan–Turkey relations Details President Gül traveled to Astana, Kazakhstan, to attend the 10th anniversary ceremonies of the Kazakh capital city of Astana. During his visit, Gül met with Kazakh leader Nursultan Nazarbayev and other participant presidents.
Armenia	Yerevan	September 6	See also: Armenia–Turkey relations Details President Abdullah Gül visited Armenia at the invitation of the Armenian President Serzh Sargsyan to watch a World Cup qualifying match between the national teams of the two countries.Gül and Sargsyan discussed the bilateral relations and ongoing dispute Nagorno-Karabakh at the Presidential Palace. Then, two leaders watched the match which Turkey beat Armenia 2-0 in Hrazdan Stadium.
Azerbaijan	Baku	September 10	See also: Azerbaijan–Turkey relations Details President Gül visited to Baku for one-day working visit. Mr. Gül and Azerbaijani President İlham Aliyev discussed their bilateral and special relations. Following a joint press conference, President Aliyev, gave dinner in honor of Abdullah Gül at the Presidential Palace.
United States	New York City	September 20–29	See also: Turkey-United States relations Details President Abdullah Gül travelled to United States to attend the 63rd Session of the United Nations General Assembly. Gül made a speech at the opening session of the UN General Assembly on 23 September and met with representatives of the Turkish Society and Meskhetian Turks. During his programme in New York, Mr. Gül had numerous bilateral meetings with heads of state and government attending the UN General Assembly
Finland	Helsinki, Jyväskylä	October 7–9	See also: Finland–Turkey relations State visit Details President Gül and his wife made official state visit to Finland at the invitation of Finnish President Tarja Halonen. Abdullah Gül met with counterpart Halonen and received Finnish Parliament Sauli Niinistö and Prime Minister Matti Vanhanen. He then flew to city of Jyväskylä and visited Alvar Aalto Museum and Jyväskylä University. Also he attended the Martti Ahtisaari Conference here.
Estonia	Tallinn	October 9–11	State visit Details President Gül and his wife Mrs. Gül made an official state visit to the Estonia at the invitation of Estonian President Toomas Hendrik Ilves. Mr. Gül attended a meeting of the Turkish-Estonian Business Council at the Estonian Chamber of Commerce and Industry. Gul met with President Ilves and Prime Minister Andrus Ansip.
Germany	Frankfurt	October 14–15	See also: Germany–Turkey relations Details President Gül and his wife Hayrünnisa Gül travelled to Frankfurt to attend as guest of honor 60th Frankfurt Book Fair. Gül and his wife visited the Frankfurt Town Hall and signed the city's Golden Book. During his visit, Mr. Gül met with German President Horst Köhler and Foreign Minister Frank-Walter Steinmeier.
Azerbaijan	Baku	November 13–14	See also: Azerbaijan–Turkey relations Details President Gül travelled to Azerbaijan to attend the Energy Summit held in Baku. Mr. Gül met with Azerbaijani President Ilham Aliyev at the Presidential Palace. Furthermore, Gül talks with other participant presidents and opened a new annex for the Baku Anatolian High School.
Turkmenistan	Ashgabat, Türkmenbaşy	November 28–29	Details President Abdullah Gül paid a working visit to Turkmenistan at the invitation of Turkmen President Gurbanguly Berdimuhamedow.

== 2009 ==
The following international trips were made by Abdullah Gül during 2009:

Country	Areas visited	Date(s)	Notes
Egypt	Sharm el-Sheikh	January 18	See also: Egypt–Turkey relations Details President Abdullah Gül attend discussed the issue of Gaza in Egypt. Mr.Gül met with Egyptian President Hosni Mubarak, French President Nicolas Sarkozy and German Chancellor Angela Merkel.
Saudi Arabia	Riyadh, Jeddah	February 3–6	See also: Saudi Arabia–Turkey relations State visit Details President Gül and his wife Hayrünnisa Gül made an official state visit to the Saudi Arabia at the invitation of King Abdullah bin Abdulaziz. Mr. and Mrs. Gül were welcomed with an official ceremony at Riyadh King Khalid International Airport by Majesty King Abdullah. After the ceremony, Gül attended the official dinner hosted by King Abdullah in his honour. On February 4, Abdullah Gül became the first foreign Muslim leader to address the Shura Council.
Russia	Moscow, Kazan	February 12–15	See also: Russia–Turkey relations State visit Details President Gül and First lady made an official state visit to the at the invitation of President Dmitry Medvedev. After the official welcoming ceremony, Gül held talks with his counterpart. Following the bilateral talks which they held a joint press conference at Grand Kremlin Palace. Also President Gül visited State Duma with Federation Council and received Russian Prime Minister Vladimir Putin. On February 14 Abdullah Gül travelled Kazan, the capital city of Tatarstan and met with Mintimer Shaimiev.
Kenya	Nairobi	February 20–22	See also: Kenya–Turkey relations State visit Details President Gül and his wife Hayrünnisa Gül made an official state visit to the Kenya. Gül is the first Turkish president to pay an official visit to Kenya. He met with Kenyan President Mwai Kibaki and Prime Minister Raila Odinga and then visited to Nairobi National Park.
Tanzania	Dodoma	February 22–23	State visit Details President Abdullah Gül with his spouse paid an official visit to Tanzania at the invitation of Tanzanian President Jakaya Mrisho Kikwete. The two countries signed a protocol for technical, scientific, economic and commercial cooperation in agriculture. Also, President Gül's visit, the first official visit to Tanzania President level.
Iran	Tehran	March 10–11	See also: Iran–Turkey relations Details Abdullah Gül travelled to Tehran to attend the 10th summit meeting of the Economic Cooperation Organization (ECO). He during the visit, met with Iranian President Mahmoud Ahmadinejad and Supreme Leader Ali Khamenei and other participant leaders.
Iraq	Baghdad	March 23–24	See also: Iraq–Turkey relations State visit Details President Gül and his wife Hayrünnisa Gül made state visit to Iraq at the invitation of President Jalal Talabani. Gül pair was welcomed with an official ceremony at the As-Salam Palace. President met with his counterpart Talabani and received Vice President Tariq Al-Hashimi, Prime Minister Nouri al-Maliki and Iraqi Turkmen politician Saadeddin Arkej. Mr. Gül's talks during his Baghdad visit centred on bilateral relations as well as regional and global issues.

== 2010 ==
The following international trips were made by Abdullah Gül during 2010:

Country	Areas visited	Date(s)	Notes
India	New Delhi	February 7 - 11	See also: India–Turkey relations State visit
Bangladesh	Dhaka	February 12 - 13	See also: Bangladesh–Turkey relations Details Abdullah Gül travelled to Dhaka on a two-day official visit to strengthen bilateral relations. He paid tribute to the martyrs of the War of Liberation in 1971 at the National Martyrs' Memorial.
Pakistan	Islamabad	March 30 - April 2	See also: Pakistan–Turkey relations Details Invited by President Asif Ali Zardari, Gül and a large delegation of parliamentarians and businessmen, launched a four-day visit to Pakistan on Tuesday (March 30). Gül visited the mausoleum of poet Muhammad Iqbal where he laid a floral wreath and offered Fatiha (prayers) at the tomb. Gül held talks with Pakistani Prime Minister Syed Yusuf Raza Gilani and the country's main opposition leader and former prime minister Nawaz Sharif.

== See also ==
- List of international presidential trips made by Recep Tayyip Erdoğan
- List of international prime ministerial trips made by Recep Tayyip Erdoğan
- Foreign relations of Turkey
