= List of international presidential trips made by Recep Tayyip Erdoğan =

World map highlighting countries visited by Erdoğan during his presidency

This is a list of international presidential trips made by Recep Tayyip Erdoğan, the 12th and current President of Turkey since he assumed the presidency on 28 August 2014. As the leader of Turkey, he has undertaken extensive international diplomacy, meeting with leaders and heads of state across the globe and representing Turkey at major international summits and conferences.

== Summary ==
As of November 2026, Recep Tayyip Erdoğan has made 277 trips to 91 countries during his presidency. His most frequent destinations reflect Turkey's strategic priorities in neighboring regions and key international partnerships.

=== Countries visited ===
The number of visits per country where Erdoğan has travelled:

21 visits: Azerbaijan

16 visits: Qatar, Russia, United States

11 visits: Northern Cyprus, Saudi Arabia

7 visits: Belgium

6 visits: Germany, Hungary, Kazakhstan, Kuwait, Uzbekistan

5 visits: Bosnia and Herzegovina, China, France, Pakistan, Turkmenistan, Ukraine, United Arab Emirates

4 visits: Albania, Algeria, Egypt, Iran, Italy, Senegal, Serbia

3 visits: Indonesia, Kyrgyzstan, United Kingdom

2 visits: Bahrain, Croatia, Ethiopia, Greece, India, Japan, Malaysia, Nigeria, Poland, Somalia, South Africa, South Korea, Spain, Tunisia, Vatican City

1 visit: Afghanistan, Angola, Argentina, Belarus, Brazil, Bulgaria, Chad, Chile, Colombia, Cuba, Czech Republic, Democratic Republic of the Congo, Djibouti, Ecuador, Equatorial Guinea, Estonia, Gambia, Ghana, Guinea, Iraq, Ivory Coast, Jordan, Kenya, Latvia, Lithuania, Madagascar, Mali, Mauritania, Mexico, Moldova, Montenegro, Mozambique, Netherlands, Oman, Paraguay, Peru, Romania, Slovakia, Slovenia, Sudan, Switzerland, Tajikistan, Tanzania, Togo, Uganda, Venezuela, Zambia

== List of visits ==
=== 2014 ===
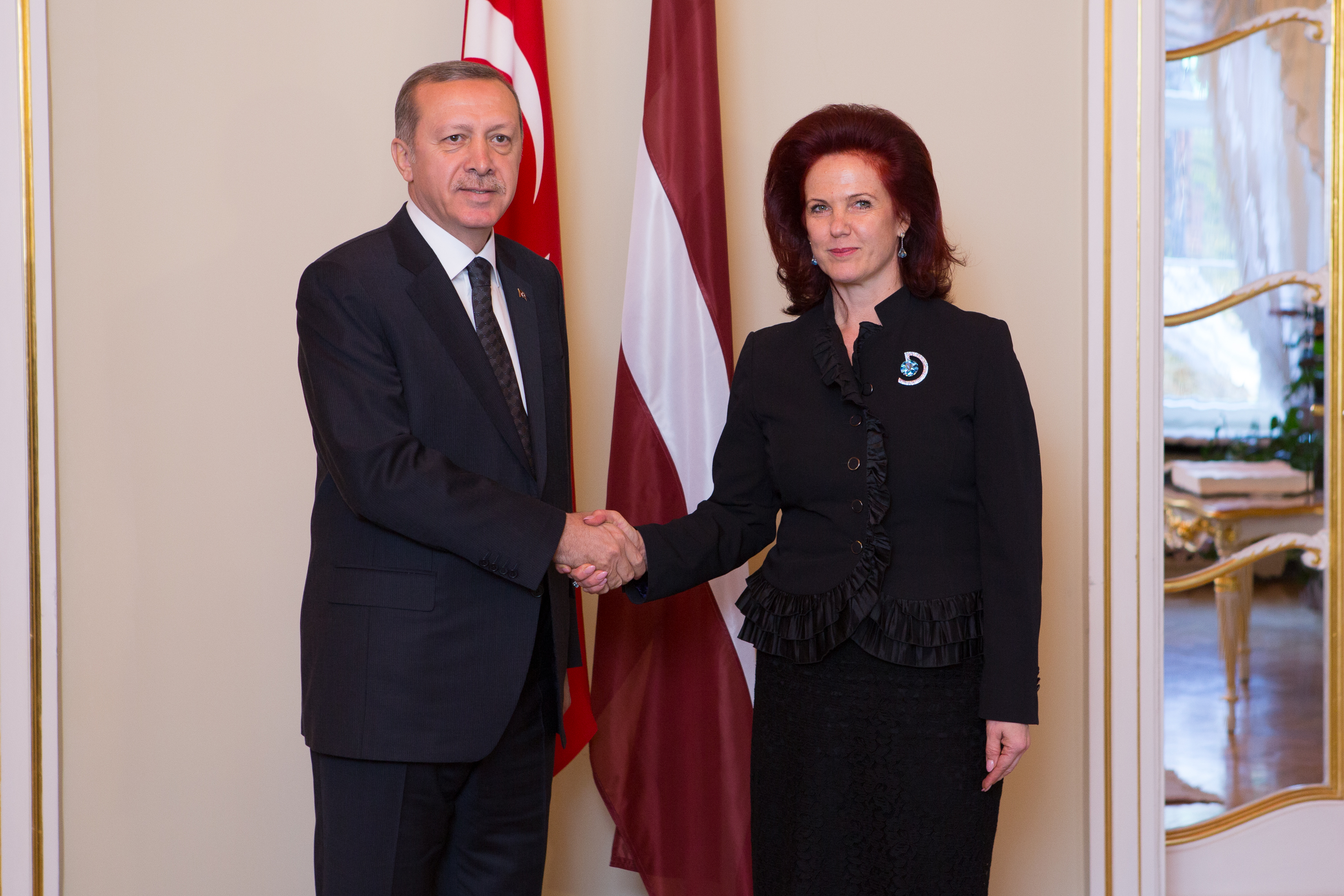
Erdoğan meeting Latvian Parliament Speaker Solvita Aboltina in Latvia, October 2014

Country	Location	Date(s)	Purpose(s)	Ref.	Note(s)
Northern Cyprus	North Nicosia	1 September 2014	State visit to Turkish Republic of Northern Cyprus.		First foreign trip as President
Azerbaijan	Baku	2–3 September 2014	State visit. Met with President Ilham Aliyev to discuss bilateral relations and regional cooperation.		
United Kingdom	London	4–5 September 2014	Working visit to discuss Turkey-UK relations and regional issues.		
Qatar	Doha	14–15 September 2014	State visit. Met with Emir Tamim bin Hamad Al Thani.		
United States	New York City	21–25 September 2014	Attended 69th session of UN General Assembly.		
Afghanistan	Kabul	18 October 2014	State visit to discuss security cooperation and Turkish aid projects.		
Latvia	Riga	22–23 October 2014	State visit. First visit by a Turkish president to Latvia.		
Estonia	Tallinn	24 October 2014	State visit. First visit by a Turkish president to Estonia.		
France	Paris	31 October 2014	State visit. Met with President François Hollande.		
Turkmenistan	Ashgabat	7–9 November 2014	State visit. First visit to Turkmenistan as Turkish president.		
Algeria	Algiers	19 November 2014	State visit. Discussed economic cooperation and regional security.		
Equatorial Guinea	Malabo	20 November 2014	State visit. Attended 2nd Turkey-Africa Partnership Summit.		Part of Africa outreach initiative

=== 2015 ===
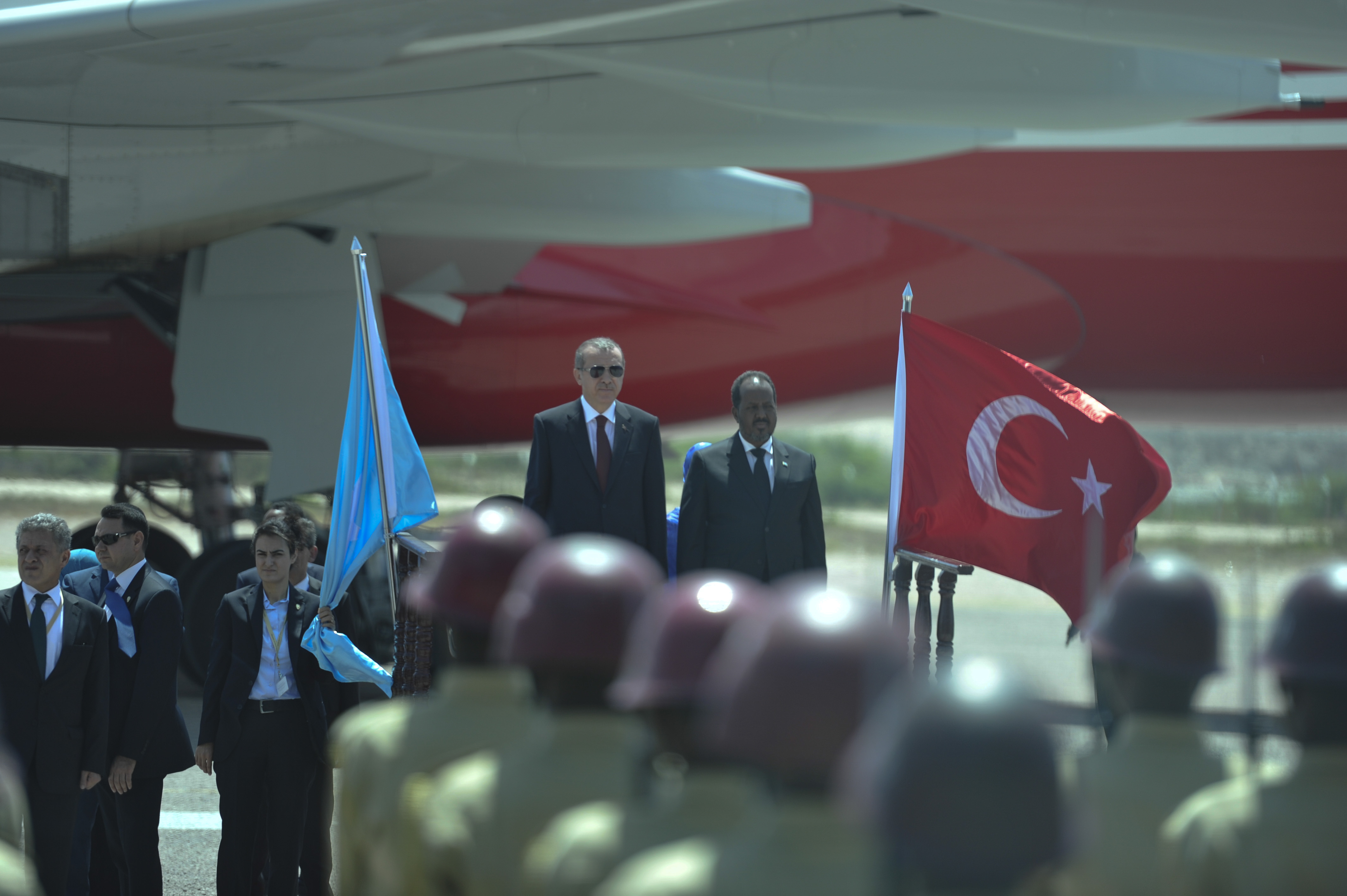
Somali President Hassan Sheikh Mohamud welcomes Erdoğan in Mogadishu, January 2015

Country	Location	Date(s)	Purpose(s)	Ref.	Note(s)
Ethiopia	Addis Ababa	20 January 2015	State visit. Met with government officials to strengthen bilateral ties.		Part of Horn of Africa tour
Djibouti	Djibouti	23 January 2015	State visit. Discussed Turkish military base and port cooperation.		
Saudi Arabia	Riyadh	23 January 2015	Working visit for consultations on regional issues.		
Somalia	Mogadishu	23 January 2015	State visit. Continued Turkey's strong support for Somalia's reconstruction.		Erdoğan widely praised for Turkey's Somalia assistance
Colombia	Bogotá	10 February 2015	State visit. First visit by a Turkish president to Colombia.		Part of Latin America tour
Cuba	Havana	12 February 2015	State visit. Proposed building a mosque in Cuba.		First Turkish presidential visit to Cuba
Mexico	Mexico City	12 February 2015	State visit. Discussed trade and economic cooperation.		
Saudi Arabia	Riyadh	28 February – 2 March 2015	Working visit for regional consultations.		
Ukraine	Kyiv	20 March 2015	State visit. Announced $10 million grant to Ukraine.		Supported Ukraine amid Russia tensions
Slovenia	Ljubljana	30 March 2015	State visit. Welcomed with official ceremony.		Part of Central European tour
Slovakia	Bratislava	30 March 2015	State visit. First visit by Turkish president to Slovakia.		
Romania	Bucharest	31 March 2015	State visit to strengthen bilateral relations.		
Iran	Tehran	7 April 2015	State visit. Discussed natural gas supplies and regional issues.		
Kazakhstan	Astana	15 April 2015	State visit. Discussed Turkic cooperation.		
Kuwait	Kuwait City	27 April 2015	Working visit for Gulf consultations.		
Germany	Karlsruhe	10 May 2015	State visit. Addressed Turkish diaspora community.		
Belgium	Brussels	10 May 2015	State visit. Met with EU officials.		
Albania	Tirana	13 May 2015	State visit. Welcomed with official ceremony.		
Bosnia and Herzegovina	Sarajevo	20 May 2015	State visit. Emphasized Turkey's support for Bosnia.		
Azerbaijan	Baku	12–13 June 2015	State visit. Met with President Aliyev, discussed Putin meeting details.		
Northern Cyprus	North Nicosia	20 July 2015	State visit on anniversary of Turkish intervention in Cyprus.		
China	Beijing	28–30 July 2015	State visit. Discussed Silk Road cooperation and Uyghur issues.		
Indonesia	Jakarta	30 July – 1 August 2015	State visit. Addressed Indonesian parliament.		
Pakistan	Islamabad	1 August 2015	State visit. Strengthened Turkey-Pakistan strategic partnership.		
Russia	Moscow	23 September 2015	State visit. Met with President Putin on Syria and energy.		
France	Paris	4 October 2015	State visit. Discussed counter-terrorism cooperation.		
Belgium	Brussels	4 October 2015	State visit. Met with EU leadership.		
Japan	Tokyo	7 October 2015	State visit. Discussed economic cooperation.		
Northern Cyprus	North Nicosia	17 October 2015	State visit to Northern Cyprus.		
France	Paris	30 November 2015	Attended UN Climate Change Conference (COP21).		
Qatar	Doha	1 December 2015	State visit. Met with Qatari leadership.		
Turkmenistan	Ashgabat	11 December 2015	State visit. Discussed energy cooperation.		
Saudi Arabia	Riyadh	29 December 2015	State visit. Discussed regional security.		

=== 2016 ===
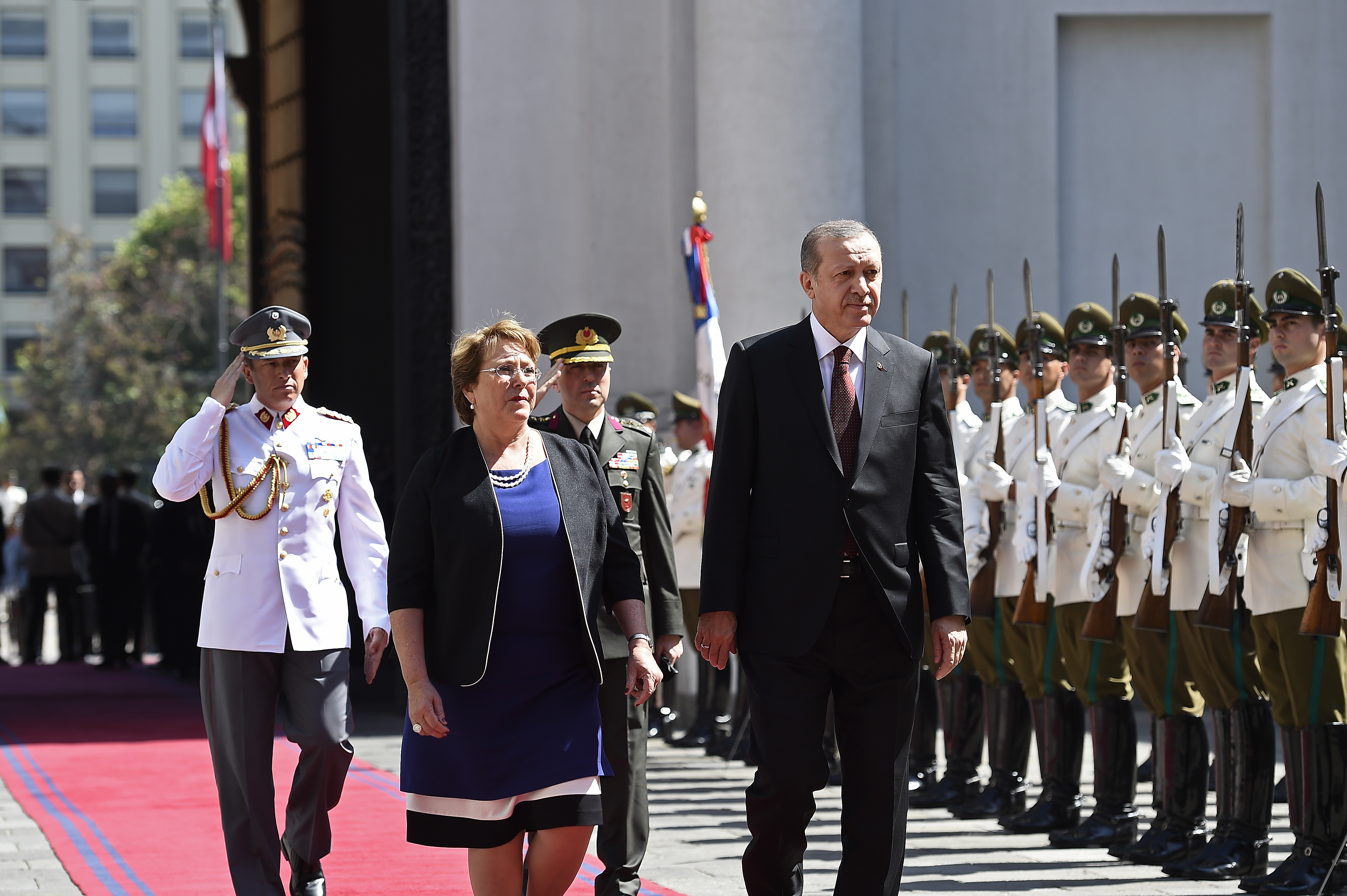
Chilean President Michelle Bachelet receives President Erdoğan, February 2016

Country	Location	Date(s)	Purpose(s)	Ref.	Note(s)
Chile	Santiago	31 January 2016	State visit. First Turkish presidential visit to Chile.		Part of Latin America tour
Peru	Lima	2 February 2016	State visit. First Turkish presidential visit to Peru.		
Ecuador	Quito	3 February 2016	State visit. First Turkish presidential visit to Ecuador.		
Senegal	Dakar	5 February 2016	State visit. Strengthened Turkey-Senegal ties.		
Ivory Coast	Yamoussoukro	28 February 2016	State visit. Discussed economic cooperation.		Part of West Africa tour
Ghana	Accra	1 March 2016	State visit. First Turkish presidential visit to Ghana.		
Nigeria	Abuja	2 March 2016	State visit. Discussed counter-terrorism cooperation.		
Guinea	Conakry	3 March 2016	State visit. First Turkish presidential visit to Guinea.		
United States	Washington, D.C.	29 March 2016	Attended Nuclear Security Summit. Met with President Barack Obama.		
Azerbaijan	Baku	25 April 2016	State visit. Discussed Nagorno-Karabakh conflict.		
Croatia	Zagreb	26 April 2016	State visit. First Turkish presidential visit to Croatia.		
Uganda	Kampala	1 June 2016	State visit. Discussed economic cooperation.		Part of East Africa tour
Kenya	Nairobi	2 June 2016	State visit. First Turkish presidential visit to Kenya.		
Somalia	Mogadishu	3 June 2016	State visit. Continued Turkey's reconstruction support.		
United States	Louisville, Kentucky	9 June 2016	Working visit. Attended funeral of Muhammad Ali.		
Poland	Warsaw	7 July 2016	Attended NATO Summit.		
Russia	Saint Petersburg	9 August 2016	State visit. First meeting with Putin after jet crisis.		Marked normalization of Turkey-Russia relations
China	Hangzhou	2 September 2016	Attended the G20 Summit. Sideline meetings with world leaders.		
United States	New York City	19 September 2016	Attended 71st session of UN General Assembly.		
Belarus	Minsk	11 November 2016	State visit. First Turkish presidential visit to Belarus.		
Pakistan	Islamabad	16 November 2016	State visit. Addressed Pakistani parliament.		
Uzbekistan	Samarkand	17 November 2016	Working visit. Discussed Turkic cooperation.		

=== 2017 ===
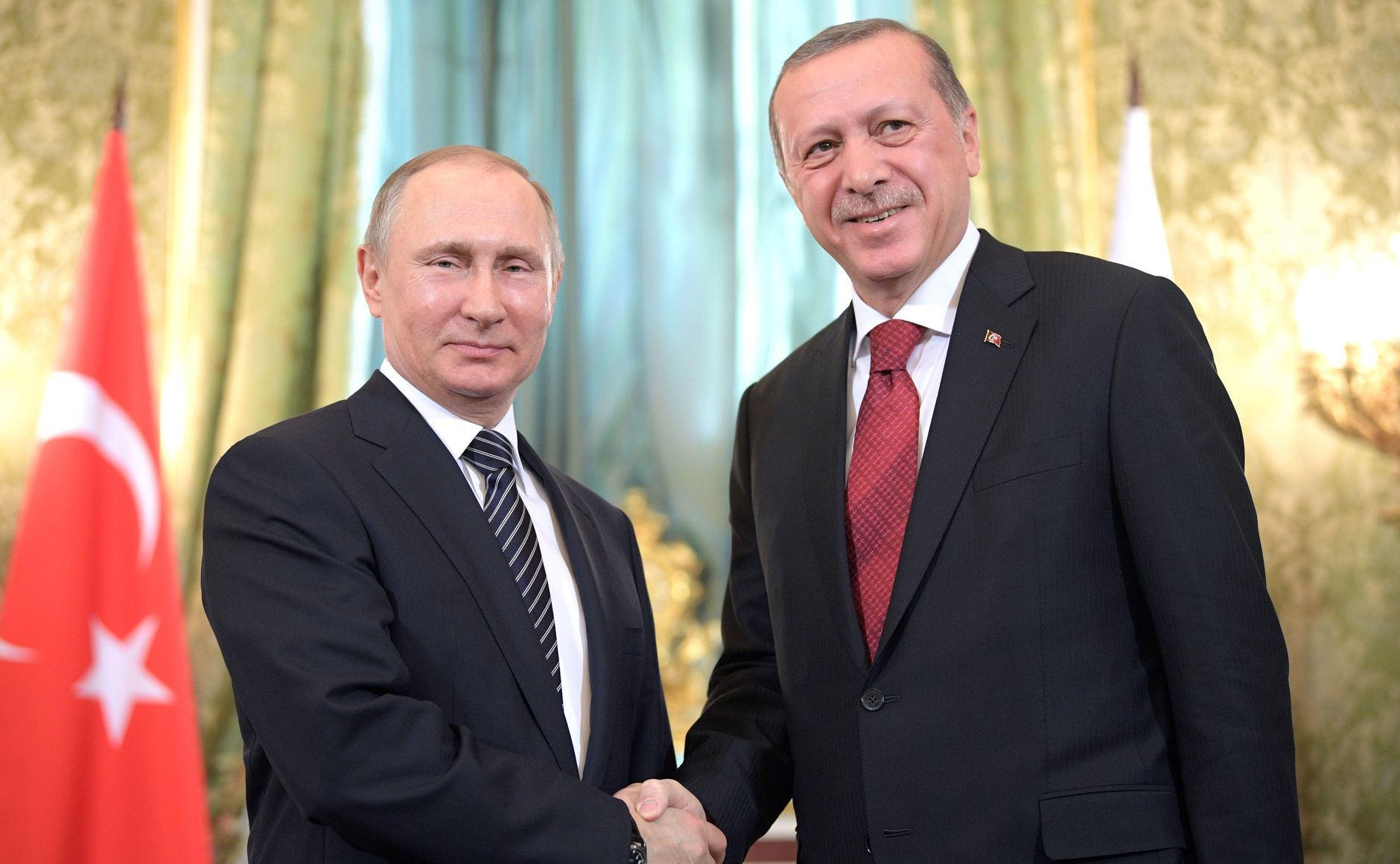
Erdoğan with Vladimir Putin in the Moscow Kremlin, March 2017

Country	Location	Date(s)	Purpose(s)	Ref.	Note(s)
Tanzania	Dar es Salam	22 January 2017	State visit. Discussed economic cooperation.		Part of East Africa tour
Mozambique	Maputo	24 January 2017	State visit. First Turkish presidential visit to Mozambique.		
Madagascar	Antananarivo	25 January 2017	State visit. First Turkish presidential visit to Madagascar.		
Bahrain	Manama	12 February 2017	State visit. Discussed Gulf security.		Part of Gulf tour
Saudi Arabia	Riyadh	13 February 2017	State visit. Met with King Salman.		
Qatar	Doha	14 February 2017	State visit. Strengthened Qatar-Turkey partnership.		
Pakistan	Islamabad	28 February – 1 March 2017	State visit. Discussed CPEC and bilateral cooperation.		
Russia	Moscow	10 March 2017	State visit. Met with President Putin on Syria coordination.		
India	New Delhi	30 April – 1 May 2017	State visit. Discussed trade and counter-terrorism.		
Russia	Sochi	3 May 2017	Working visit. Met with Putin on Syria safe zones.		
Kuwait	Kuwait City	9 May 2017	State visit. Discussed Gulf relations.		
China	Beijing	14–15 May 2017	Attended Belt and Road Forum. Sideline meetings.		
United States	Washington, D.C.	15–17 May 2017	Working visit. Met with President Donald Trump.		Visit marred by clash between Turkish security and protesters
Belgium	Brussels	25 May 2017	Working visit. Met with NATO leadership.		
Germany	Berlin	7–8 July 2017	State visit. Addressed Turkish diaspora.		
Saudi Arabia	Riyadh	23 July 2017	State visit. Discussed Qatar diplomatic crisis.		Turkey supported Qatar during blockade
Kuwait	Kuwait City	24 July 2017	State visit. Mediation efforts on Qatar crisis.		
Qatar	Doha	24 July 2017	State visit. Reaffirmed Turkey's support for Qatar.		
Jordan	Amman	21 August 2017	State visit. Discussed Palestinian issue.		
Kazakhstan	Astana	8 September 2017	State visit. Discussed Turkic cooperation.		
United States	New York City	17–21 September 2017	Attended 72nd session of UN General Assembly.		
Iran	Tehran	4 October 2017	State visit. Discussed Kurdish referendum in Iraq.		
Ukraine	Kyiv	9 October 2017	State visit. Discussed Crimean Tatars and bilateral cooperation.		
Serbia	Belgrade	9–11 October 2017	State visit. Visited Sandžak region, discussed Balkans.		
Poland	Warsaw	17 October 2017	State visit. Discussed defense cooperation.		
Azerbaijan	Baku	30–31 October 2017	State visit. Discussed energy cooperation.		
Kuwait	Kuwait City	13–14 November 2017	State visit. Continued Gulf consultations.		
Qatar	Doha	14–15 November 2017	State visit. Strengthened strategic partnership.		
Russia	Sochi	22 November 2017	State visit. Discussed Syria, S-400 missile system.		
Greece	Athens	7–8 December 2017	State visit. First Turkish presidential visit to Greece in 65 years.		Historic visit despite tensions
Sudan	Khartoum	24–25 December 2017	State visit. Discussed Red Sea security.		Part of Africa tour
Chad	N'Djamena	26 December 2017	State visit. First Turkish presidential visit to Chad.		
Tunisia	Tunis	27 December 2017	State visit. Discussed economic cooperation.		

=== 2018 ===
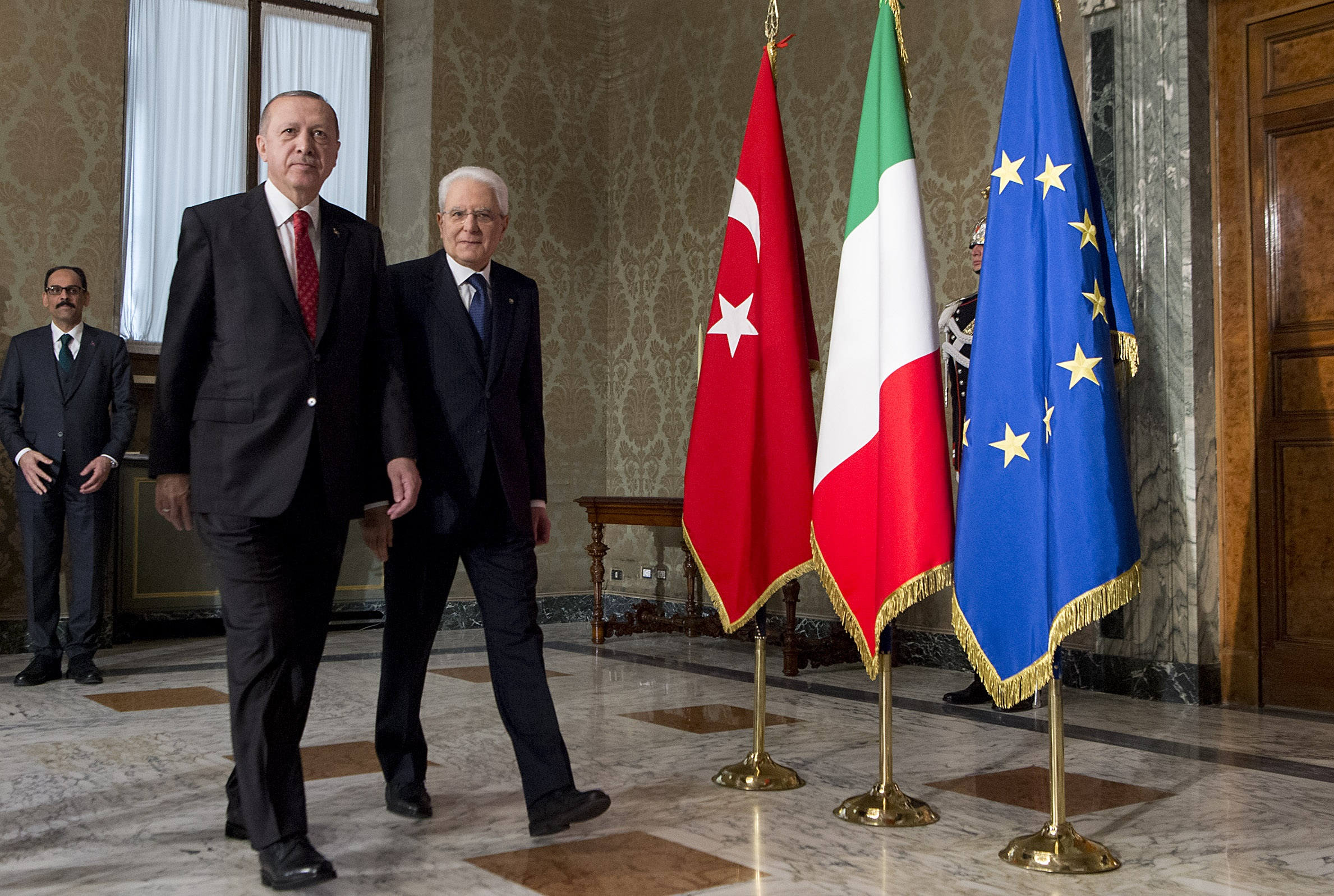
Erdoğan and Italian President Sergio Mattarella in Rome, February 2018

Country	Location	Date(s)	Purpose(s)	Ref.	Note(s)
France	Paris	5 January 2018	Working visit. Met with President Emmanuel Macron.		Attempted to improve EU-Turkey relations
Italy	Rome	4–5 February 2018	Working visit. Met with President Sergio Mattarella and Prime Minister Paolo Gentiloni.		
Vatican City	Vatican City	5 February 2018	Working visit. Met with Pope Francis to discuss Jerusalem.		Protests occurred outside Vatican
Algeria	Algiers	26–28 February 2018	State visit. Part of four-nation Africa tour.		
Mauritania	Nouakchott	28 February – 1 March 2018	State visit. First Turkish presidential visit to Mauritania.		
Senegal	Dakar	1–2 March 2018	State visit. Discussed economic ties.		
Mali	Bamako	2 March 2018	State visit. First Turkish presidential visit to Mali.		
Bulgaria	Varna	26 March 2018	Working visit. Attended EU-Turkey summit.		Discussed migration and customs union
Uzbekistan	Tashkent	29 April–1 May 2018	State visit. Discussed Turkic cooperation.		
South Korea	Seoul	2–3 May 2018	State visit. First Turkish presidential visit to South Korea.		
United Kingdom	London	13–16 May 2018	State visit. Met with Queen Elizabeth II and Prime Minister Theresa May.		Large protests in London
Bosnia and Herzegovina	Sarajevo	20 May 2018	State visit. Held rally with 40,000 supporters.		Campaign rally before Turkish elections
Azerbaijan	Baku	10 July 2018	State visit. First foreign visit after re-election as president.		
Northern Cyprus	North Nicosia	11 July 2018	State visit following re-election.		
Belgium	Brussels	11–12 July 2018	Attended NATO Summit.		
South Africa	Johannesburg	25–26 July 2018	Working visit. Attended BRICS summit as guest.		
Zambia	Lusaka	27–27 July 2018	State visit. First Turkish presidential visit to Zambia.		
Kyrgyzstan	Bishkek	1 September 2018	State visit. Called for stronger Turkic-Kyrgyz ties.		
Iran	Tehran	7 September 2018	Working visit. Trilateral summit with Russia on Syria.		
Azerbaijan	Baku	15 September 2018	State visit. Discussed bilateral cooperation.		
Russia	Sochi	17 September 2018	Working visit. Agreed with Putin on Idlib demilitarized zone.		Major breakthrough on Syria
United States	New York City	21–25 September 2018	Attended 73rd session of UN General Assembly. Called for new global system.		
Germany	Berlin	28–29 September 2018	State visit. Aimed to normalize relations after tensions.		First state visit to Germany in years
Hungary	Budapest	8–9 October 2018	State visit. Received warm welcome from Viktor Orbán.		
Moldova	Chișinău, Comrat	17–18 October 2018	State visit. First Turkish presidential visit to Moldova.		Visited Gagauzia region
France	Paris	10–11 November 2018	Working visit. Attended WWI centenary commemoration.		
Argentina	Buenos Aires	30 November – 1 December 2018	Working visit. Attended the G20 Summit.		Part of South America tour
Paraguay	Asunción	2 December 2018	State visit. First Turkish presidential visit to Paraguay.		
Venezuela	Caracas	3 December 2018	State visit. Met with President Nicolás Maduro.		Controversial visit amid Venezuela crisis

=== 2019 ===
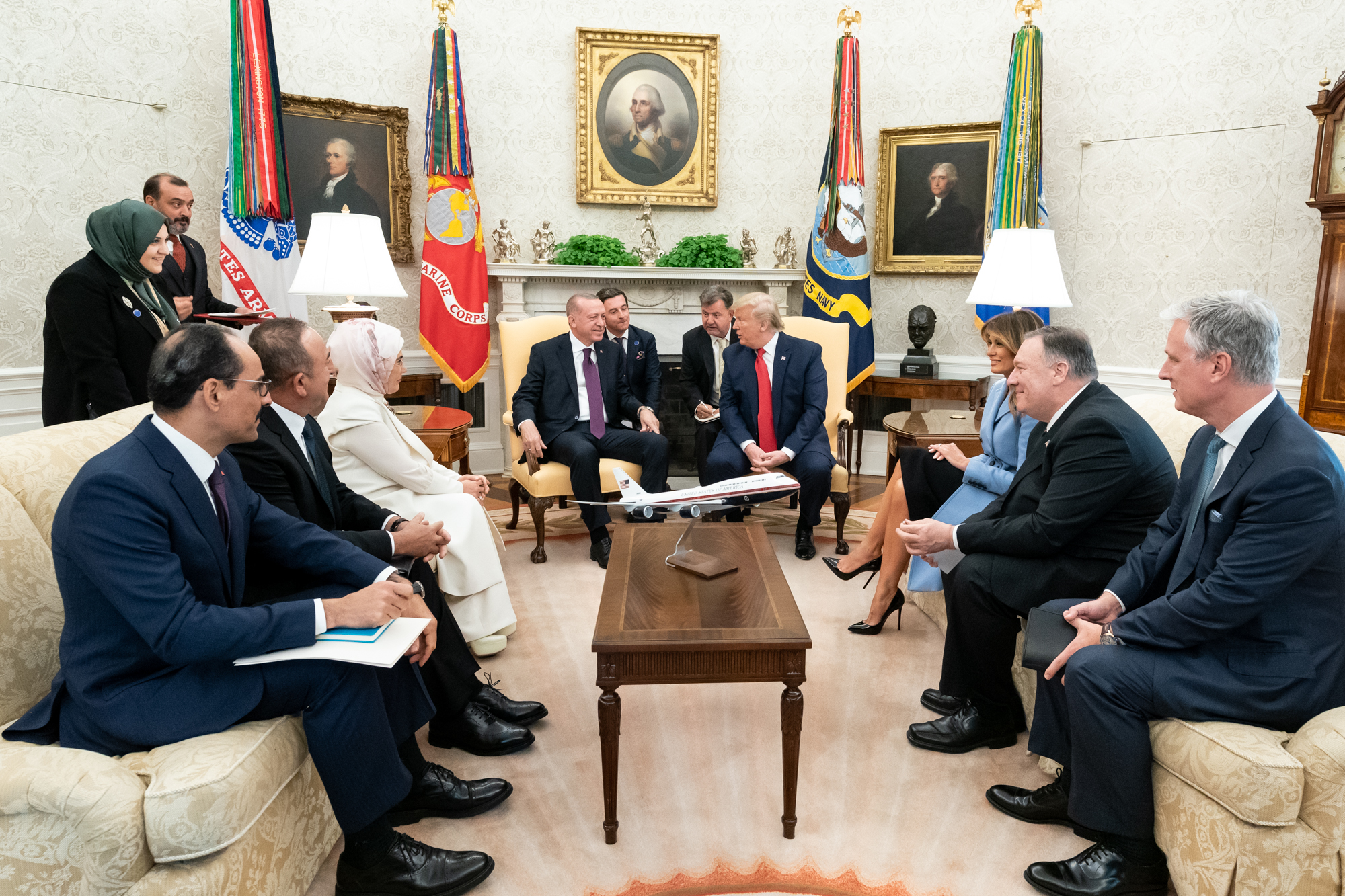
Erdoğan with U.S. President Donald Trump in the Oval Office, November 2019

Country	Location	Date(s)	Purpose(s)	Ref.	Note(s)
Russia	Moscow	23 January 2019	Working visit. Discussed Syria with President Putin.		
Russia	Sochi	14 February 2019	Working visit. Continued Syria coordination with Putin.		
Russia	Moscow	8 April 2019	State visit. Discussed S-400 missile system delivery.		
Tajikistan	Dushanbe	15 June 2019	Working visit. Discussed regional cooperation.		
Japan	Osaka	27–29 June 2019	Working visit. Attended G20 Summit, met with President Trump on a S-400.		
China	Beijing	29 June – 1 July 2019	Official visit. Affirmed importance of ties with China.		
Bosnia and Herzegovina	Sarajevo	9–11 July 2019	State visit. May have affected Bosniak leadership race.		
Russia	Moscow	27 August 2019	State visit. Discussed Idlib situation in Syria.		
United States	New York City	21–24 September 2019	Working visit. Attended 74th session of UN General Assembly.		
Serbia	Belgrade	7–9 October 2019	State visit. Said Turkey-Serbia relationship at its best level.		
Azerbaijan	Baku	14–15 October 2019	State visit. Strengthened strategic partnership.		
Russia	Moscow	22 October 2019	State visit. Discussed Syria safe zone with Putin.		After Turkey's Syria operation
Qatar	Doha	25 October 2019	State visit. Discussed regional security.		
Hungary	Budapest	7 November 2019	State visit. Continued close cooperation with Orbán.		
United States	Washington, D.C.	12–13 November 2019	Working visit. Met with President Trump at White House.		Tense visit amid S-400 controversy
United Kingdom	London	3–5 December 2019	Working visit. Attended NATO summit.		
Switzerland	Geneva	16–17 December 2019	Working visit. Addressed Turkish community.		
Malaysia	Kuala Lumpur	18–19 December 2019	Working visit. Attended Kuala Lumpur Summit.		
Tunisia	Tunis	18–19 December 2019	Working visit. Discussed Libya situation.		

=== 2020 ===
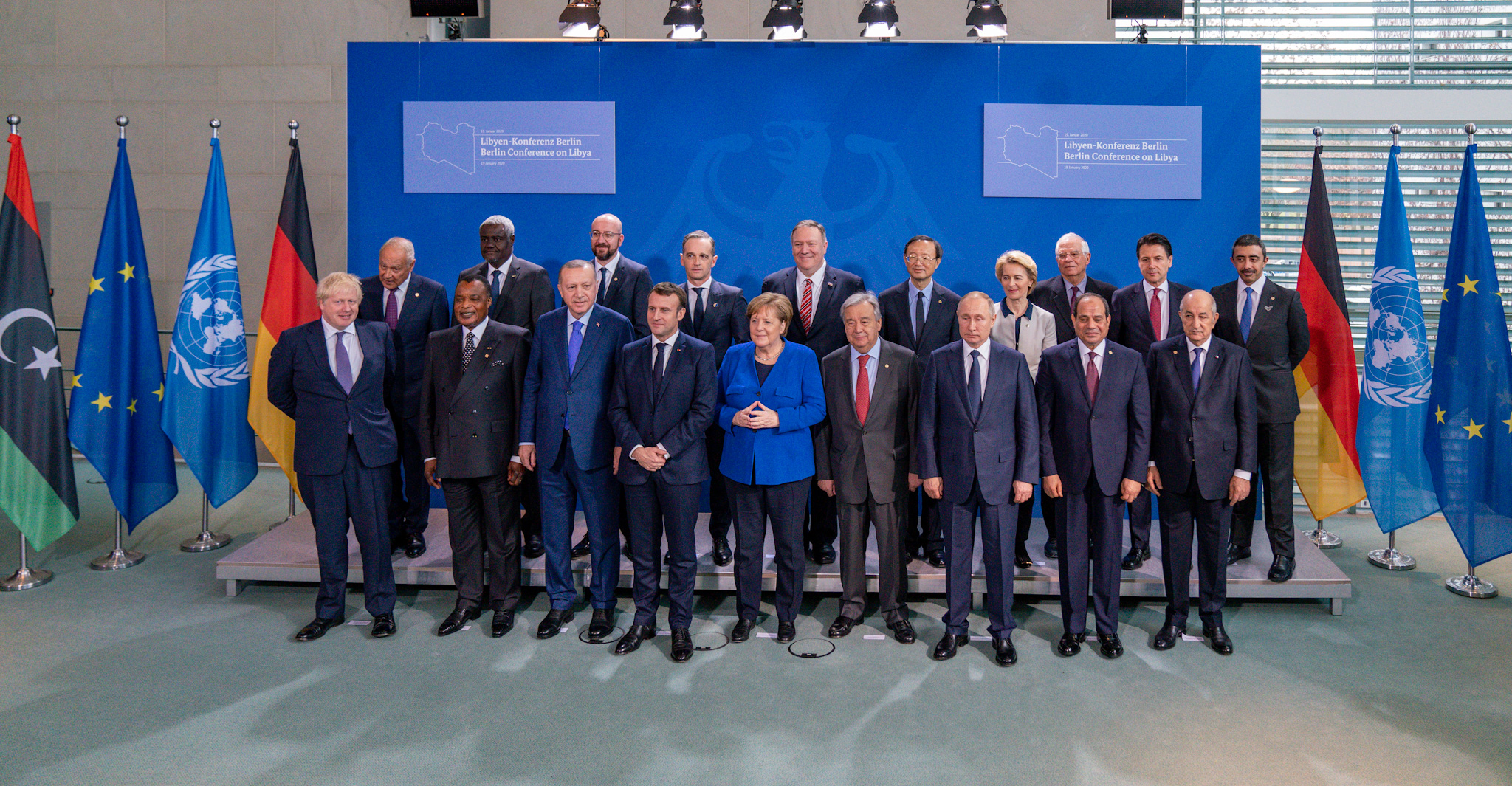
Erdoğan meets with leaders at the Libya Summit in Berlin, January 2020

Country	Location	Date(s)	Purpose(s)	Ref.	Note(s)
Germany	Berlin	19 January 2020	Working visit. Attended Libya Conference.		
Algeria	Algiers	26 January 2020	State visit. Discussed bilateral cooperation.		
Gambia	Banjul	27 January 2020	State visit. First Turkish presidential visit to Gambia.		
Senegal	Dakar	28 January 2020	State visit. Strengthened economic ties.		
Ukraine	Kyiv	3 February 2020	State visit. Discussed defense cooperation and Crimea.		
Pakistan	Islamabad	13–14 February 2020	State visit. Addressed joint session of parliament.		
Azerbaijan	Baku	25 February 2020	State visit. Discussed Nagorno-Karabakh.		
Russia	Moscow	5 March 2020	Working visit. Emergency meeting with Putin on Idlib crisis.		Critical meeting before COVID-19 restrictions
Belgium	Brussels	9 March 2020	Working visit. Met with NATO and EU officials.		Last major trip before pandemic restrictions
Qatar	Doha	2 July 2020	Working visit. Discussed regional cooperation during pandemic.		
Kuwait	Kuwait City	7 October 2020	Working visit. Expressed condolences for Emir's death.		
Qatar	Doha	7 October 2020	Working visit. Part of Gulf visit.		
Northern Cyprus	North Nicosia	15 November 2020	Working visit. Controversial visit to divided Varosha.		Visit criticized by international community
Azerbaijan	Baku	9–10 December 2020	State visit. Attended the Nagorno-Karabakh victory parade.		Celebrated Azerbaijan's victory

=== 2021 ===
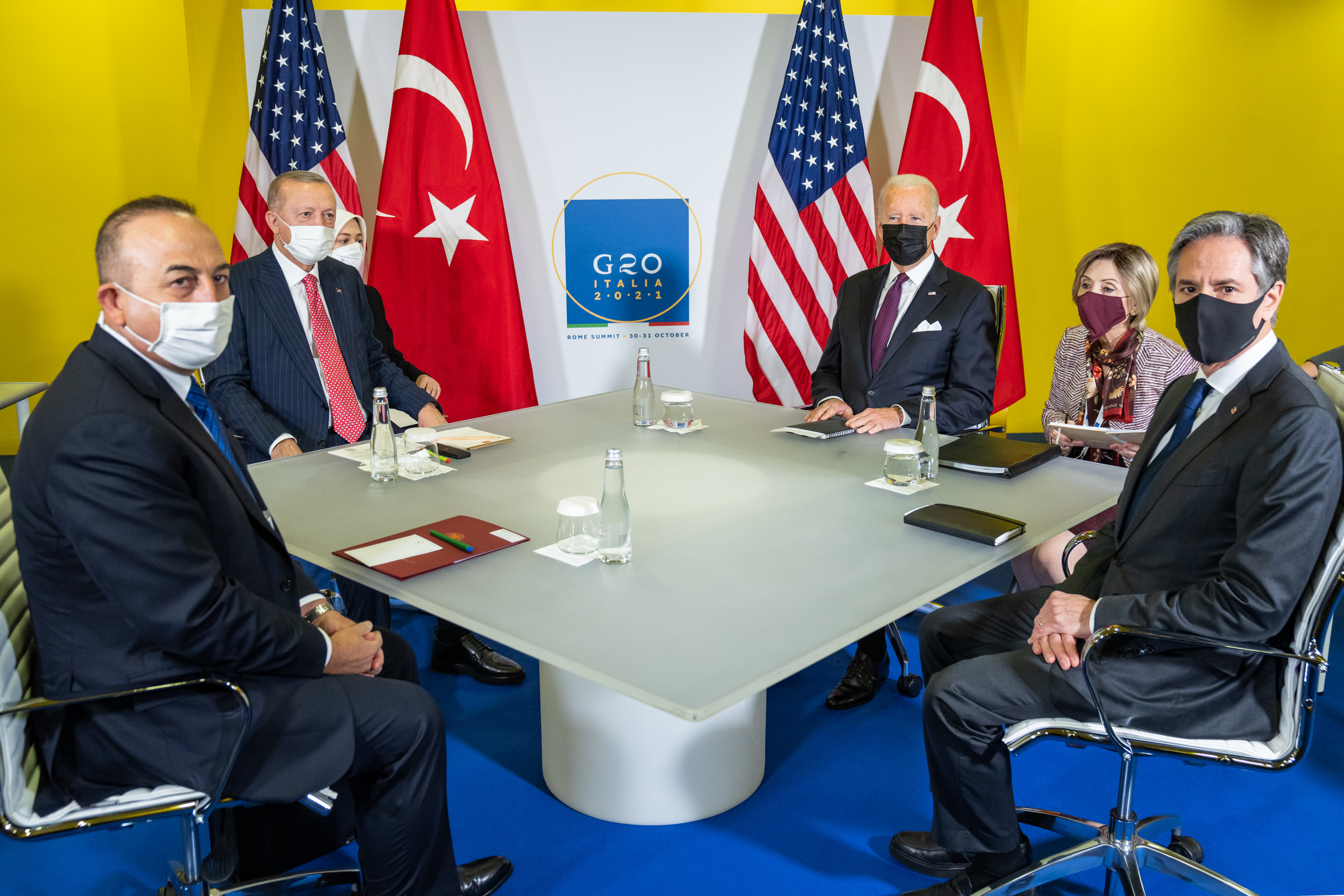
Erdoğan in a meeting with US president Joe Biden, October 2021

Country	Location	Date(s)	Purpose(s)	Ref.	Note(s)
Belgium	Brussels	13 June 2021	Working visit. Attended NATO Summit.		
Azerbaijan	Baku, Shusha	14–15 June 2021	State visit. Signed Shusha Declaration with Azerbaijan.		Historic declaration strengthening alliance
Northern Cyprus	North Nicosia	19–20 July 2021	State visit. Controversial statement on two-state solution.		Raised tensions with international community
Bosnia and Herzegovina	Sarajevo	27 August 2021	State visit. Discussed Balkans stability.		
Montenegro	Podgorica	28 August 2021	State visit. First Turkish presidential visit to Montenegro.		
United States	New York City	19–22 September 2021	Working visit. Attended 76th session of UN General Assembly.		
Russia	Sochi	29 September 2021	State visit. Discussed Syria, Libya, and Afghanistan with Putin.		
Angola	Luanda	17–18 October 2021	State visit. First Turkish presidential visit to Angola.		Part of Africa tour
Togo	Lomé	18–19 October 2021	State visit. First Turkish presidential visit to Togo.		
Nigeria	Abuja	19–20 October 2021	State visit. Discussed counter-terrorism cooperation.		
Azerbaijan	Fuzuli, Zangilan	26 October 2021	State visit. Visited liberated territories in Karabakh.		
Italy	Rome	29–31 October 2021	Working visit. Attended the G20 Summit, met with President Biden.		First Biden-Erdoğan meeting as presidents
Turkmenistan	Ashgabat	27–28 November 2021	Working visit. Attended ECO Summit.		
Qatar	Doha	6–7 December 2021	State visit. Discussed economic cooperation.		

=== 2022 ===
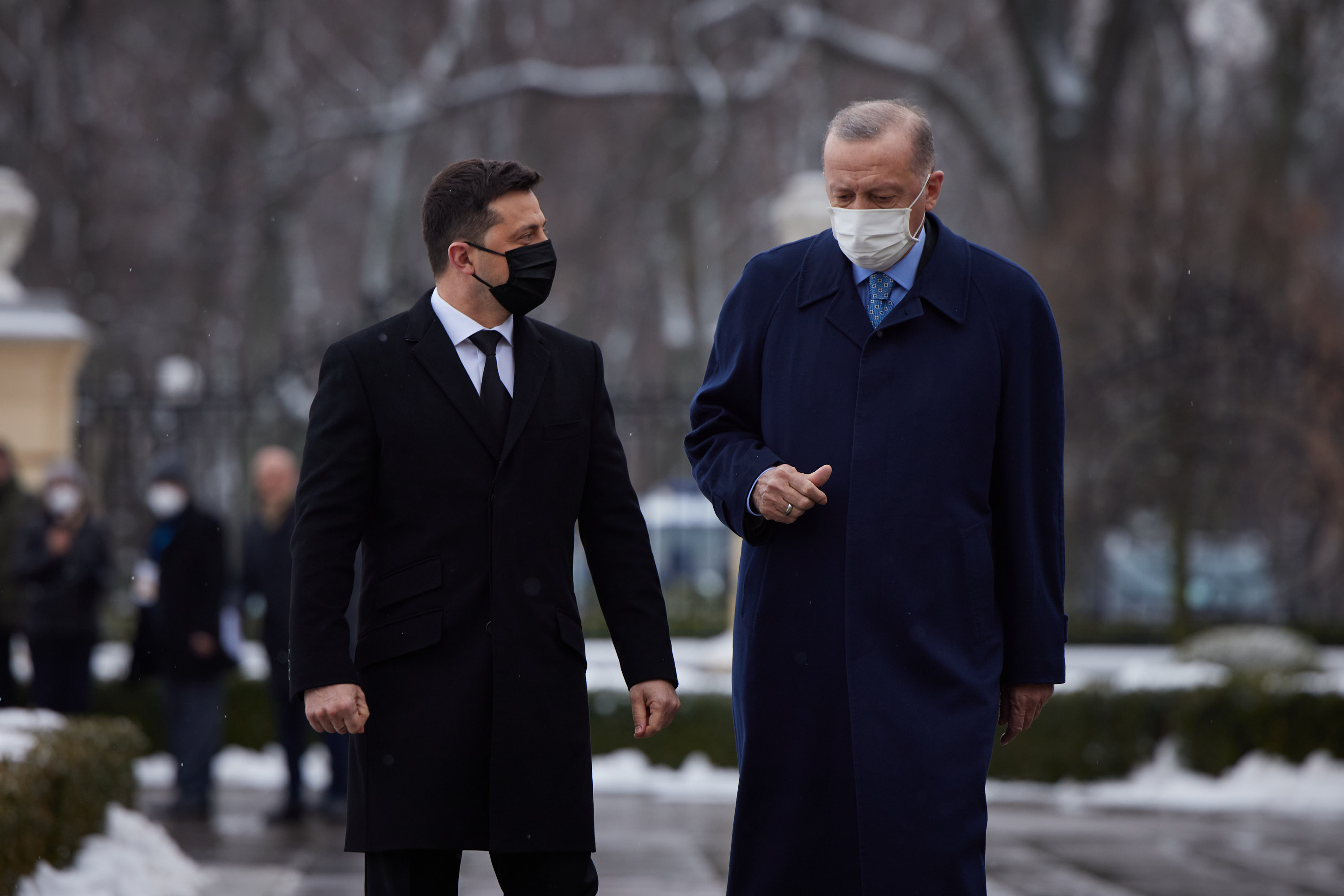
Erdoğan's meeting with Ukrainian President Volodymyr Zelenskyy in Kyiv, February 2022

Country	Location	Date(s)	Purpose(s)	Ref.	Note(s)
Albania	Tirana	17 January 2022	State visit. Discussed Balkans cooperation.		
Ukraine	Kyiv	3 February 2022	State visit. Met with President Zelenskyy weeks before Russian invasion.		Warned about impending conflict
UAE	Abu Dhabi	14–15 February 2022	State visit. Marked normalization of Turkey-UAE relations.		Historic visit after years of tension
Democratic Republic of the Congo	Kinshasa	20–21 February 2022	State visit. First Turkish presidential visit to the DR Congo.		Part of Africa tour
Senegal	Dakar	21–22 February 2022	State visit. Strengthened economic ties.		
Belgium	Brussels	24 March 2022	Working visit. Attended the emergency NATO summit on Ukraine.		
Uzbekistan	Tashkent	29–30 March 2022	State visit. Discussed Turkic cooperation.		
Saudi Arabia	Mecca, Medina, Riyadh	27–30 April 2022	State visit. Performed Umrah, met with Crown Prince Mohammed bin Salman.		First visit to Saudi Arabia in years
UAE	Dubai	17 May 2022	State visit. Continued normalization process.		
Azerbaijan	Baku	28–29 May 2022	State visit. Discussed energy cooperation.		
Spain	Madrid	28–30 June 2022	Working visit. Attended NATO Summit.		Lifted veto on Sweden and Finland membership
Iran	Tehran	18–19 July 2022	Working visit. Trilateral summit with Russia on Syria.		
Russia	Sochi	5 August 2022	Working visit. Discussed Ukraine grain deal with Putin.		
Ukraine	Lviv	18 August 2022	Working visit. Met with Zelenskyy and UN Secretary-General António Guterres.		Discussed Black Sea grain corridor
Bosnia and Herzegovina	Sarajevo	6–7 September 2022	Working visit. Discussed Balkans stability.		
Serbia	Belgrade	7–8 September 2022	Working visit. Part of Balkans tour.		
Croatia	Zagreb	8–9 September 2022	Working visit. Discussed bilateral cooperation.		
Uzbekistan	Samarkand	15–16 September 2022	Working visit. Attended Shanghai Cooperation Organisation summit.		
United States	New York City	18–20 September 2022	Working visit. Attended 77th session of UN General Assembly.		
Czech Republic	Prague	6–7 October 2022	Working visit. Attended European Political Community summit.		
Kazakhstan	Astana	12–13 October 2022	Working visit. Attended Conference on Interaction and Confidence-Building Measures in Asia summit.		
Azerbaijan	Zangilan	20–22 October 2022	Official visit. Attended groundbreaking ceremony for Horadiz-Zangilan railway.		
Uzbekistan	Samarkand	11–13 November 2022	Working visit. Attended Organization of Turkic States summit.		
Indonesia	Bali	14–16 November 2022	Working visit. Attended the G20 Summit.		Arrived after Istanbul bombing
Bahrain	Manama	17–19 November 2022	State visit. Discussed Gulf cooperation.		
Qatar	Doha	20 November 2022	State visit. Discussed regional security.		
Turkmenistan	Turkmenbashi	14 December 2022	State visit. Attended trilateral summit with Azerbaijan.		
Qatar	Lusail	18 December 2022	State visit. Attended the FIFA World Cup final.		

=== 2023 ===
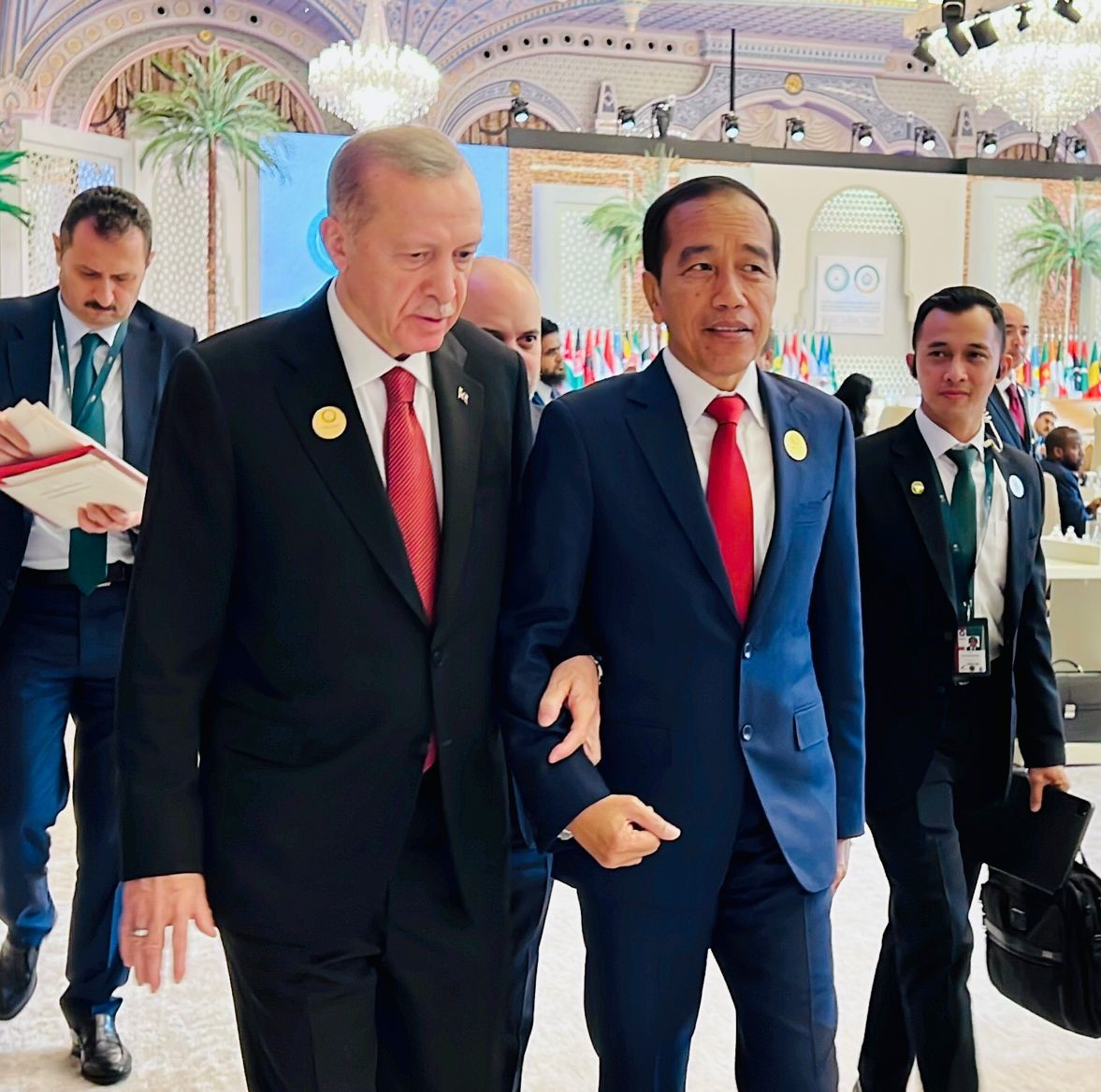
Erdoğan and Joko Widodo on the sidelines of Extraordinary Summit of the Organisation of Islamic Cooperation in Riyadh, November 2023

Country	Location	Date(s)	Purpose(s)	Ref.	Note(s)
Northern Cyprus	North Nicosia	12 June 2023	State visit. Discussed Cyprus issue.		
Azerbaijan	Baku	13 June 2023	State visit. Strengthened strategic partnership.		
Lithuania	Vilnius	11–12 July 2023	Working visit. Attended NATO Summit.		
Saudi Arabia	Jeddah	17–18 July 2023	Official visit. Met with Crown Prince Mohammed bin Salman.		Part of Gulf tour
Qatar	Doha	18 July 2023	Official visit. Discussed economic cooperation.		
UAE	Abu Dhabi	19 July 2023	Official visit. Continued normalization of relations.		
Northern Cyprus	North Nicosia	20 July 2023	Official visit. Anniversary of Turkish intervention in Cyprus.		
Hungary	Budapest	20–21 August 2023	Working visit. Attended Turkic States summit.		
Russia	Sochi	4 September 2023	Working visit. Discussed Black Sea grain deal with Putin.		
India	New Delhi	8–10 September 2023	Working visit. Attended the G20 Summit.		
United States	New York City	17–21 September 2023	Working visit. Attended 78th session of UN General Assembly.		
Azerbaijan	Nakhchivan	25 September 2023	State visit. Discussed Zangezur corridor.		
Kazakhstan	Astana	3–4 November 2023	Working visit. Attended Organization of Turkic States summit.		
Uzbekistan	Tashkent	8–10 November 2023	Working visit. Discussed bilateral cooperation.		
Saudi Arabia	Riyadh	11–12 November 2023	Working visit. Attended extraordinary OIC summit on Gaza.		
Germany	Berlin	17–18 November 2023	Working visit. Met with Chancellor Olaf Scholz.		
Algeria	Algiers	21–22 November 2023	Official visit. Discussed Mediterranean cooperation.		
UAE	Dubai	30 November – 2 December 2023	Working visit. Attended COP28 climate conference.		
Qatar	Doha	3 December 2023	Working visit. Part of Gulf visit.		
Greece	Athens	7 December 2023	Working visit. Attempted to improve Turkey-Greece relations.		Positive atmosphere despite longstanding disputes
Hungary	Budapest	18–19 December 2023	Working visit. Discussed EU-Turkey relations with Orbán.		

=== 2024 ===
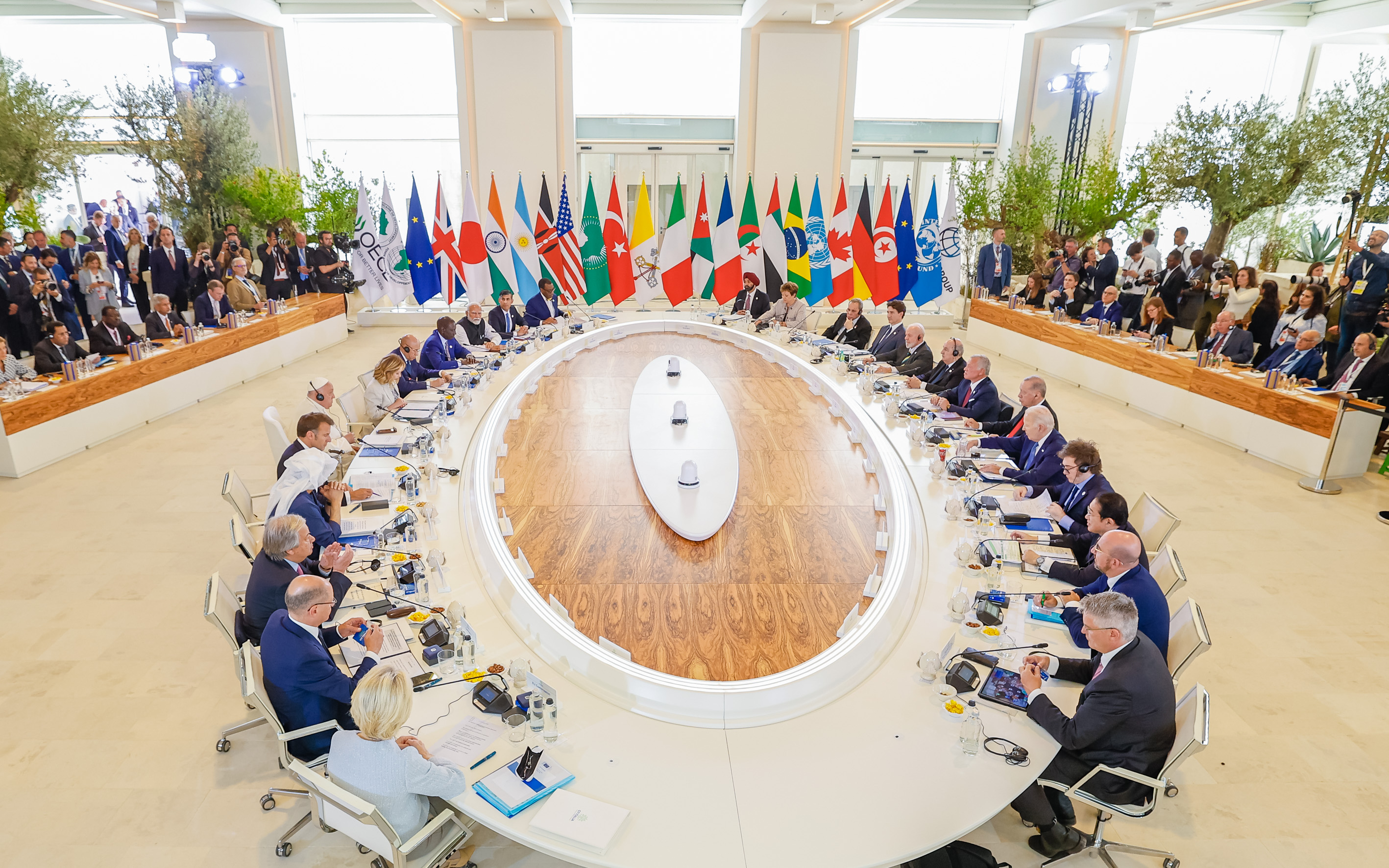
Erdoğan at the G7 Summit in Italy, June 2024

Country	Location	Date(s)	Purpose(s)	Ref.	Note(s)
UAE	Dubai	12–13 February 2024	Working visit. Discussed economic cooperation.		
Egypt	Cairo	14 February 2024	State visit. United efforts to stop Israel's Rafah offensive.		Condemned Israeli actions in Gaza
Iraq	Baghdad, Erbil	22 April 2024	State visit. First Turkish presidential visit to Iraq in years.		Discussed PKK and water issues
Spain	Madrid	12–13 June 2024	Working visit. Called for ceasefire in Gaza.		
Italy	Fasano	14–15 June 2024	Working visit. Attended G7 Summit on Gaza and AI.		
Kazakhstan	Astana	3–4 July 2024	Working visit. Attended Shanghai Cooperation Organisation summit.		
Germany	Berlin	6 July 2024	Working visit. Met with Chancellor Scholz.		
United States	Washington, D.C.	9–11 July 2024	Working visit. Attended NATO Summit.		
Northern Cyprus	North Nicosia	20 July 2024	Working visit. Anniversary commemoration.		
United States	New York City	21–26 September 2024	Working visit. Attended 79th session of UN General Assembly.		
Albania	Tirana	10 October 2024	Working visit. Part of Balkans visit.		
Serbia	Belgrade	10–11 October 2024	Working visit. Discussed regional cooperation.		
Russia	Kazan	23–24 October 2024	Working visit. Attended BRICS summit.		
Kyrgyzstan	Bishkek	5–6 November 2024	Working visit. Attended Organization of Turkic States summit.		
Hungary	Budapest	7 November 2024	Working visit. Attended European Political Community summit.		
Saudi Arabia	Riyadh	11 November 2024	Working visit. Attended extraordinary Arab-Islamic summit on Gaza.		
Azerbaijan	Baku	11–12 November 2024	Working visit. Attended COP29 climate conference.		
Brazil	Rio de Janeiro	17–19 November 2024	Working visit. Attended the G20 Summit.		
Egypt	Cairo	19 December 2024	Working visit. Attended D-8 summit.		

=== 2025 ===
Country	Location	Date(s)	Purpose(s)	Ref.	Note(s)
Malaysia	Kuala Lumpur	10–11 February 2025	State visit. Discussed Islamic cooperation.		Part of Asia tour
Indonesia	Jakarta	11–12 February 2025	State visit. Strengthened bilateral ties.		
Pakistan	Islamabad	12–13 February 2025	State visit. Addressed Pakistani parliament.		
Italy	Rome	29 April 2025	Working visit. Met with President Sergio Mattarella and Prime Minister Giorgia Meloni.		
Vatican City	Vatican City	29 April 2025	Working visit. Attended funeral of Pope Francis.		
Northern Cyprus	North Nicosia	3 May 2025	Working visit. Discussed Cyprus negotiations.		
Albania	Tirana	16 May 2025	Working visit. Attended European Political Community summit.		
Hungary	Budapest	21 May 2025	Working visit. Continued close cooperation with Orbán.		
Azerbaijan	Lachin	28 May 2025	Working visit. Visited liberated territories.		
Netherlands	The Hague	24–25 June 2025	Working visit. Attended NATO Summit.		
Azerbaijan	Khankendi	4 July 2025	Working visit. Visited Karabakh region.		
Northern Cyprus	North Nicosia	20 July 2025	Working visit. Anniversary commemoration.		
China	Tianjin	31 August – 1 September 2025	Sideline meeting. Discussed bilateral cooperation.		
Qatar	Doha	15 September 2025	Working visit. Discussed Gaza situation.		
United States	New York City, Washington, D.C.	22–25 September 2025	Working visit. Attended 80th session of UN General Assembly.		
Azerbaijan	Qabala	7 October 2025	Working visit. Discussed regional cooperation.		
Egypt	Sharm El Sheikh	13 October 2025	Working visit. Attended World Food Forum.		
Kuwait	Kuwait City	21 October 2025	Working visit. Discussed Gulf cooperation.		
Qatar	Doha	21–22 October 2025	Working visit. Part of Gulf tour.		
Oman	Muscat	22–23 October 2025	Working visit. Discussed bilateral relations.		
Azerbaijan	Baku	8 November 2025	Working visit. Attended Organization of Turkic States summit.		
South Africa	Johannesburg	21–23 November 2025	Working visit. Attended the G20 Summit.		
Turkmenistan	Ashgabat	11–12 December 2025	Working visit. Discussed energy cooperation.		

=== 2026 ===
Country	Location	Date(s)	Purpose(s)	Ref.	Note(s)
Saudi Arabia	Riyadh	3–4 February 2026	Working visit. Discussed regional security.		
Egypt	Cairo	4 February 2026	Working visit. Continued partnership on Gaza.		
Ethiopia	Addis Ababa	17 February 2026	Working visit. Discussed African Union cooperation.		
Kazakhstan	Astana, Turkestan	13–15 May 2026	State visit. Discussed Turkic cooperation.		
Qatar	Doha	14 July 2026	State visit. Gave condolences for the death of former Emir.		
Saudi Arabia	Mecca	7 August 2026	Working visit. Signed a mutual defense pact with Saudi Arabia and Pakistan.		
Kyrgyzstan	Bishkek	31 August – 1 September 2026	Attended the SCO summit and the opening ceremony of the 6th World Nomad Games.		
United States	New York City	20–23 September 2026	Attended the 81th United Nations General Assembly.		
South Korea	Seoul	2–4 November 2026	State visit at the invitation of President Lee Jae Myung. Discussed enforcing trade cooperation, including in defense and high technology, as well as a potential nuclear partnership.		
Azerbaijan	Shusha, Khojaly, Khankendi	8 November 2026	At the invitation of President Aliyev, President Erdogan commemorated Azeri Victory Day in Shusha where they held bilateral meetings. Both presidents visited the Khojaly Genocide Mémorial and the Khankendi Victory Monument to honor fallen martyrs from the Karabakh conflicts.		

== Future trips ==
Country	Location	Date	Details
Libya	Tripoli	8-9 December 2026	Erdogan plans to attend the 4th Africa–Türkiye Partnership Summit.
United States	Miami	14-15 December 2026	Erdogan plans to attend the 2026 G20 Miami summit.
Azerbaijan	Baku	23-24 June 2027	Erdogan is scheduled to attend the 16th OIC summit.
Syria	Damascus	To be announced	Erdogan is expected to visit Damascus soon.

== Multilateral meetings ==
Multilateral meetings of the following intergovernmental organizations are scheduled to take place during Erdoğan's term in office as president.

Group	Year							
Group	2014	2015	2016	2017	2018	2019	2020	2021
UN General Assembly	September 27–28 (United States) New York City	September 28–29 (United States) New York City	September 20–24 (United States) New York City	September 18–22 (United States) New York City	September 25 – October 1 (United States) New York City	September 24–30 (United States) New York City	September 22–29 (United States) New York City (virtual)	September 21–27 (United States) New York City
G20	November 15–16 (Australia) Brisbane	November 15–16 (Turkey) Antalya	September 4–5 (China) Hangzhou	July 7–8 (Germany) Hamburg	November 30 – December 1 (Argentina) Buenos Aires	June 28–29 (Japan) Osaka	November 21–22 (Saudi Arabia) Riyadh (virtual)	October 30–31 (Italy) Rome
NATO	September 4–5 (United Kingdom) Newport	—N/a	July 8–9 (Poland) Warsaw	May 25 (Belgium) Brussels	July 11–12 (Belgium) Brussels	December 3–4 (United Kingdom) London	—N/a	June 14 (Belgium) Brussels
OIC	—N/a	—N/a	April 14–15 (Turkey) Istanbul	December 13 (Turkey) Istanbul	May 18 (Turkey) Istanbul	May 31 (Saudi Arabia) Riyadh	—N/a	December 17 (Pakistan) Islamabad
D-8	—N/a	—N/a	—N/a	October 20 (Turkey) Istanbul	—N/a	—N/a	—N/a	April 8 (Bangladesh) Dhaka
Organization of Turkic States	June 5 (Turkey) Bodrum	September 11 (Kazakhstan) Astana	—N/a	—N/a	September 3 (Kyrgyzstan) Cholpon-Ata	October 15 (Azerbaijan) Baku	—N/a	November 12 (Turkey) Istanbul
Other multilateral meetings	Turkey–Africa Partnership Summit (Equatorial Guinea) Malabo	UN Climate Change Conference (France) Paris	Nuclear Security Summit (United States) Washington, D.C.	ECO Summit (Pakistan) Islamabad	EU–Turkey Summit (Bulgaria) Varna	Kuala Lumpur Summit (Malaysia) Kuala Lumpur	Turkey–Africa Partnership Summit; Istanbul	ECO Summit (Turkmenistan) Ashgabat

Group	Year					
Group	2022	2023	2024	2025	2026	2027
UN General Assembly	September 20–23 (United States) New York City	September 20–23 (United States) New York City	September 24–25 (United States) New York City	September 23–24 (United States) New York City	September 22–28 (United States) New York City	September 22–28 (United States) New York City
G20	November 15–16 (Indonesia) Bali	September 9–10 (India) New Delhi	November 18–19 (Brazil) Rio de Janeiro	November 22–23 (South Africa) Johannesburg	December 14–15 (United States) Miami	November 27–28 (United Kingdom) Manchester
NATO	March 24 (Belgium) Brussels; June 29–30 (Spain) Madrid	July 11–12 (Lithuania) Vilnius	July 9–11 (United States) Washington, D.C.	June 24–25 (Netherlands) The Hague	July 7–8 (Turkey) Ankara	TBD (Albania) Tirana
OIC	June 14–17 (The Gambia) Banjul	November 11 (Saudi Arabia) Riyadh	November 11 (Saudi Arabia) Riyadh	—N/a	—N/a	June 23–24 (Azerbaijan) Baku
D-8	—N/a	—N/a	December 19 (Egypt) Cairo	—N/a	—N/a	TBD (Indonesia) Jakarta
Organization of Turkic States	November 11 (Uzbekistan) Samarkand	November 3–4 (Kazakhstan) Astana	November 6 (Kyrgyzstan) Bishkek	October 6–7 (Azerbaijan) Baku	October 29–30 (Turkey) Ankara	TBD; Uzbekistan
EPC	6 October, (Czech Republic) Prague	1 June, (Moldova) Bulboaca	18 July, (United Kingdom) Woodstock	16 May, (Albania) Tirana	4 May, (Armenia) Yerevan	
EPC	6 October, (Czech Republic) Prague	5 October, (Spain) Granada	7 November, (Hungary) Budapest	2 October, (Denmark) Copenhagen	12 November, (Republic of Ireland) Dublin	
Future event

== See also ==
- List of international prime ministerial trips made by Recep Tayyip Erdoğan
- List of international presidential trips made by Abdullah Gül
- List of international prime ministerial trips made by Binali Yıldırım
- Foreign relations of Turkey
