= Ohrid Summit 2008 =

Meeting of presidents from central European states

Ohrid Summit 2008 was the name of the 15th Meeting of Presidents of Central European States that took place from 2 May to 3 May 2008 in the city of Ohrid, Republic of Macedonia. Prior to the summit, the President of the Republic of Macedonia, Branko Crvenkovski, said the Macedonians "will be especially honored as the host of the greatest political event ever organized" in his country.

== Participant countries and presidents ==
Ohrid Summit 2008 Logo

- Albania, Bamir Topi
- Austria, Heinz Fischer
- Bosnia and Herzegovina, Haris Silajdžić
- Bulgaria, Georgi Parvanov
- Croatia, Stjepan Mesić
- Czech Republic, Václav Klaus
- Germany, Horst Köhler
- Hungary, László Sólyom
- Italy, Giorgio Napolitano
- (North Macedonia) Macedonia (2008 host nation), Branko Crvenkovski
- Moldova, Vladimir Voronin
- Montenegro, Filip Vujanović
- Poland, Lech Kaczyński
- Romania, Traian Băsescu
- Serbia, Boris Tadić
- Slovakia, Ivan Gašparovič
- Slovenia, Danilo Türk
- Turkey, Abdullah Gül
- Ukraine, Viktor Yushchenko

== See also ==
- Ohrid
- Republic of Macedonia
