= Egypt–Turkey relations =

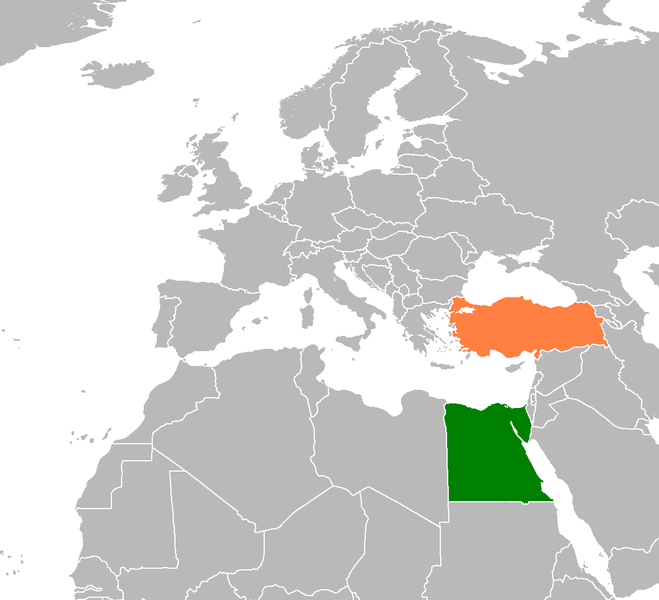
- Egypt: Turkey

Diplomatic mission
- Embassy of Egypt, Ankara: Embassy of Turkey, Cairo

Egypt and Turkey are bound by strong religious, cultural and historical ties, but diplomatic ties between the two have remained extremely friendly at times and extremely strained at others. For three centuries, Egypt was part of the Ottoman Empire, whose capital was Istanbul in modern-day Turkey, despite governor of Egypt, Muhammad Ali, waging war against the Ottoman sultan, Mahmud II, in 1831.

Prior to that both modern-day Egypt & Turkey were part of the Roman Empire which covered the territories of both modern-day states.

Turkey established diplomatic relations with Egypt in 1925 at the level of charge d' affaires and upgraded its mission in Cairo to ambassadorial level in 1948. Both countries have embassies and consulate generals in each other's capitals. Both countries signed a free trade agreement in December 2005. Both countries are full members of the Union for the Mediterranean. A natural gas deal between Egypt and Turkey—the largest joint Egyptian-Turkish project to date, estimated to cost $4 billion—is being implemented. On 16 April 2008, Egypt and Turkey signed a memorandum of understanding to improve and further military relations and cooperation between the two countries.

Relations however have been quite tense on many occasions in the history of both countries including the Nasser era in Egypt in the 1950s and 1960s. It has also strongly deteriorated in the period following the overthrow of the Egyptian president Mohamed Morsi on 3 July 2013 following a 48-hour deadline on 1 July, marking the end of anti-government protests that took place between 30 June and 3 July that year.

On 23 November 2013, the Egyptian government expelled the Turkish ambassador in Cairo after a months-long diplomatic crisis. In 2021, both countries started having talks about normalizing ties.

== Diplomatic relations ==
=== Relations under Mohamed Naguib and Gamal Abdel Nasser ===
Following the military coup by the Free Officers Movement led by Mohamed Naguib in 1952 the relations of the Egypt and Turkey deteriorated. On 4 January 1954 the ambassador of Turkey to Cairo, Hulusi Fuat Tugay, was asked to leave country due to his alleged activities against the Egyptian government. Tugay's wife was the second cousin of King Farouk who had been removed from office through the 1952 coup. The envoy of Egypt in Turkey, Ahmed Hakkı, was also recalled by the Egyptian government.

In the midst of the Cold War and during the rule of Egyptian President Gamal Abdel Nasser, relations between both countries also soured dramatically due to Turkey's membership in the British-led Baghdad Pact, which Nasser viewed as a major threat to his efforts to eliminate Western presence in the Arab world, and because of the growing influence of Nasser's Pan-Arab ideology, called Nasserism. In addition, Turkey was the first Muslim majority country to recognize the State of Israel, Egypt's archrival at the time, showing even more its clear alignment to the West. In 1958, Egypt entered a brief union with Syria, Turkey's southern neighbor with whom it shared longtime diplomatic and border disputes, causing severe tensions between the two countries with Turkey responding by its engagement in a secret "peripheral alliance" with Israel. The tensions reached their peak in 1957 prior to the unification with Syria when Nasser, fearful of a Baghdad Pact toppling of the Syrian government, sent a contingent force to assist Syrian forces that was dispatched near the Syrian-Turkish border as a response to a Turkish threat of incursion when a huge number of troops amassed along the border. This near-confrontation between Egyptian and Turkish troops marked a dark spot in both countries' relations and eventually led to both sides withdrawing, ending the possible escalation of the crisis.

=== Relations under post-2011 Egyptian revolution ===
Turkish Prime Minister Recep Tayyip Erdoğan made his first three days official visit to Egypt on 12 September 2011, and was accompanied by six ministers and approximately 200 businessmen. This visit was considered a diplomatic success and was met with much enthusiasm by Egyptians. CNN reported some Egyptians saying "We consider him as the Islamic leader in the Middle East", while others were appreciative of his role in supporting Gaza. Erdogan was later honored in Tahrir Square by members of the Egyptian Revolution Youth Union, and members of the Turkish embassy were presented with a coat of arms in acknowledgment of the Prime Minister's support of the Egyptian Revolution of 2011.

A week after he left, Turkish Foreign Minister, Ahmet Davutoğlu proclaimed his vision of a strategic alliance between Egypt and Turkey which he described as an "Axis of Democracy". However, some voiced concerns that the Egyptian revolution was not fulfilled and that Erdogan was seeking his own country's strategic interests. It was feared that by forming an alliance with the SCAF interim government in Egypt during the country's transition to democracy, Erdogan may have tipped the balance in favor of those that stand between the Egyptians and their freedom.

=== Relations following the removal of Mohamed Morsi from office ===
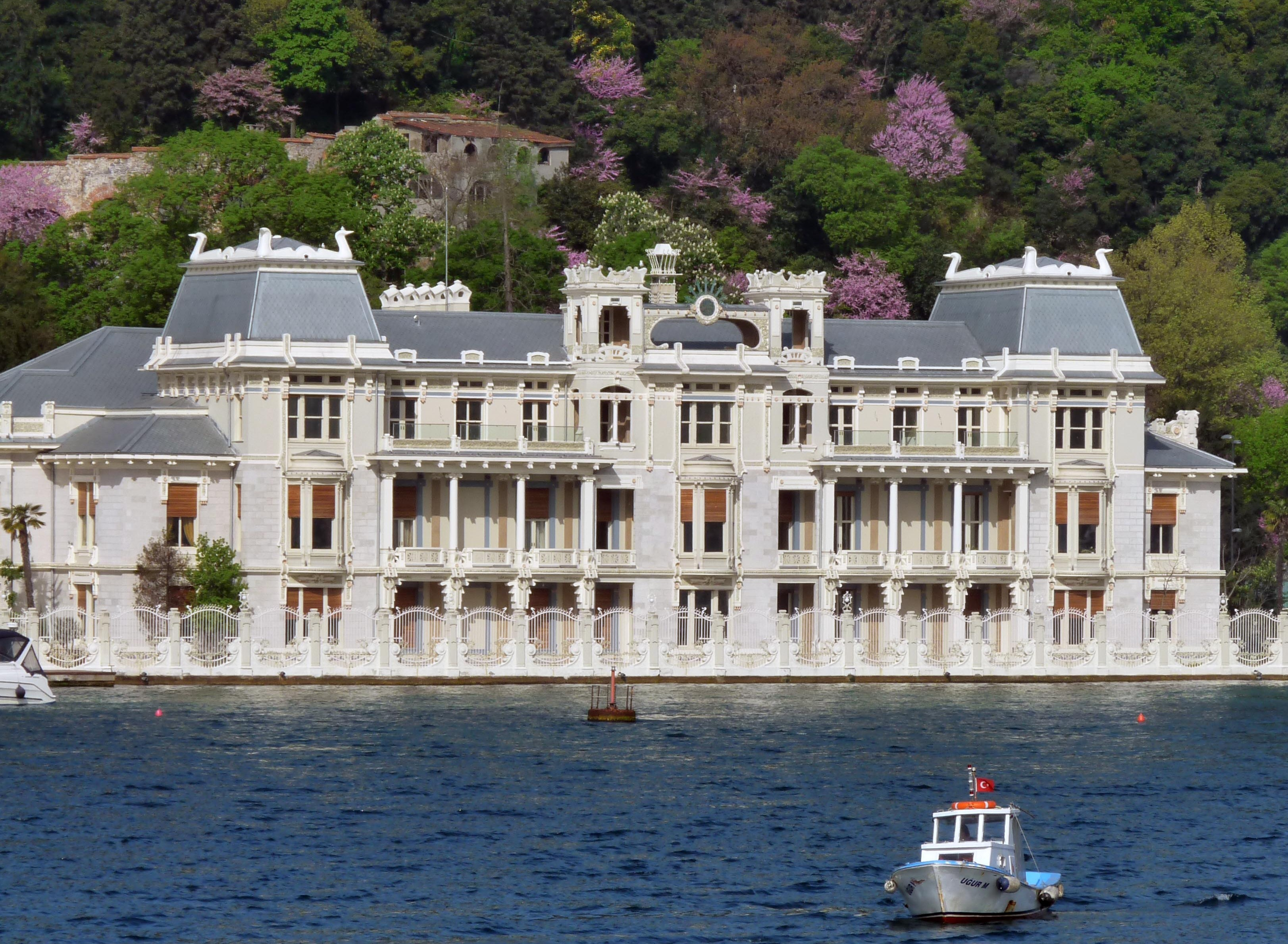
Consulate-General of Egypt in Istanbul

Following the anti-government protests in the middle of 2013 that led to the overthrow of Egyptian President Mohamed Morsi who was strongly backed by Turkey's ruling Justice and Development Party (AKP), signs of strained relations rose between the newly appointed interim government of Egypt and Recep Tayyip Erdoğan's government in Turkey, mainly due to Erdoğan's pro-Brotherhood views, culminating with the August 2013 sit-in raids in Rabaa and Nahda by security forces, where sit-ins organized by the Muslim Brotherhood were dispersed, leading to clashes that resulted in 638 deaths, of which 43 were police officers. The incident resulted in both countries recalling their respective ambassadors and was met with several verbal assaults by Erdoğan, who described the event as "anti-democratic" and referred to it as a "massacre," while suggesting that Egypt's leaders should be put under a "fair and transparent trial." This was followed by a suspension of military exercises involving the two countries. Erdoğan also accused the Egyptian military of conspiring with Israel to topple Morsi's government at an expanded meeting of the provincial chairs of his ruling AKP and claimed to possess "proof" for that: "This is what has been implemented in Egypt. Who is behind this? Israel. We have evidence". The claim was rejected by the Egyptian interim government, describing it as "baseless" and intended to "strike at the unity of Egyptians," with presidential spokesperson Ahmed Muslimani saying that "agents of the West should not give lessons in patriotism".

In response to Erdoğan's statements, Egypt's interim president, Adly Mansour announced on his Twitter account on 17 August that Egypt would to sign the international document recognizing the Armenian genocide:

Our representatives at the United Nations will sign the international document that acknowledges the Armenian genocide, which was committed by the Turkish military, leading to the deaths of one million.

In addition, dozens of Egyptian articles have been published condemning Turkey's denial of the Armenian genocide and urging the country's new leaders to recognize it. There have also been calls to erect a memorial monument commemorating the victims of the genocide in Cairo.

On 23 November 2013, the Egyptian government expelled the Turkish ambassador to the country, Huseyin Avni Botsali, and recalled their ambassador from Ankara indefinitely after several months of tensions with Turkey's ruling AKP-led government. In response, Turkey also barred the Egyptian ambassador, who was out of the country at the time, and declared him a persona non grata. The declaration came a day after Turkish PM Recep Tayyip Erdoğan repeated his criticism of Egypt's interim government and his call for the urgent release of former Egyptian President Mohamed Morsi. Egypt's Foreign Ministry spokesman, Badr Abdelatty accused Erdoğan of meddling in the country's internal affairs by raising public opinion against the Egyptian government and supporting proscribed organizations that are bent on destabilizing the nation.

=== Relations under Abdel Fattah al-Sisi ===
In July 2014, the Egyptian Foreign Ministry warned that relations would worsen since Erdoğan called Sisi a "tyrant". This comes after Prime Minister Recep Tayyip Erdoğan slammed Egypt's President Abdel Fattah al-Sisi as an "illegitimate tyrant", saying that Egypt could not be relied upon to negotiate a truce with Israel during Operation Protective Edge. "Is Sisi a party (to a ceasefire)? Sisi is a tyrant himself," Erdogan told reporters. "He is not different from the others," he said, adding that it was Egypt's current rulers who were blocking humanitarian aid channels to the Gaza Strip ruled by the Hamas Islamist militant group. Egypt's Foreign Minister Sameh Shoukry said Erdogan's comments were "unacceptable".

Due to Turkey's interference in Egypt's domestic affairs, the Egyptian foreign ministry also canceled joint naval drills with Turkey.

In September 2014, Egypt's foreign minister cancelled a meeting with Turkish president Erdoğan requested by Turkey after Erdoğan made a speech critical of Egypt in the UN General Assembly. An advisor to the Turkish president has denied that the countries' leaders were planning to meet. However, later Egypt's foreign ministry handed out a scanned document of Turkey's meeting proposal to the media and was published by Egypt's Youm7 newspaper. Sisi's administration also decided to cancel the "Ro-Ro" agreement with Turkey, blocking Turkey from transporting Turkish containers to the Gulf via Egyptian ports. An intense campaign started by Egypt and Saudi Arabia against Turkey made it lose its predicted easy victory of membership in the United Nations Security Council.

Following the 2016 Turkish coup d'état attempt, President Recep Tayyip Erdoğan gave an interview with Al Jazeera explaining that "President al-Sisi has nothing to do with democracy, and that he’s killed thousands of his own people." The remarks were condemned by Egypt's Foreign Ministry spokesman Ahmed Abu Zeid saying that the Turkish president "keeps confusing matter and is losing the ability to make sound judgments" and that this reflects "the difficult circumstances the Turkish president has been through. "He cannot differentiate between an evident revolution where more than 30 million Egyptians demanded the support of the Egyptian military and between military coups as we know them," the statement explained.

On 22 November 2017, Egypt's public prosecutor has ordered the detention of 29 people suspected of espionage on behalf of Turkey against Egypt national interest and joining a terrorist organization. They are also accused of money laundering, conducting overseas calls without a license and trading currency without a license. According to the results of an investigation by the General Intelligence Services, the group has been recording phone calls and passing information to Turkish intelligence as part of a plan to bring the Muslim Brotherhood back to power in Egypt.

Following the executions of 9 people convicted of killing Hisham Barakat in February 2019, President Erdogan sharply criticized President al-Sisi, saying he refused to talk to "someone like him."

In June 2019, former Egyptian President Mohamed Morsi died during a court hearing. Erdogan blamed the Egyptian leadership for Morsi's death and called him a martyr.

==== Proposal to recognize the Armenian genocide ====
Due to the ongoing deterioration of relations between Egypt and Turkey, the Government of Egypt led by el-Sisi, has been receiving proposals to recognize the Armenian genocide, a sensitive subject that Turkey has denounced more than once. Filmmaker Mohamed Hanafi had produced a movie, "Who Killed the Armenians?", in response to the ongoing tensions between Turkey and Egypt, as an act of Egyptian solidarity to Armenia.

In February 2019, Abdel Fattah el-Sisi announced it had implicitly recognized the Armenian Genocide, further deteriorating the relationship between Turkey and Egypt.

==== Proposal to grant asylum to Fethullah Gülen ====
MP Emad Mahrous called on the Egyptian government to grant asylum to Fethullah Gülen. In the request, sent to Speaker of the House of Representatives Ali Abdel Aal, Prime Minister Sherif Ismail and Foreign Minister Sameh Shoukry on 24 July 2016, Mahrous notes that "[Turkey] was a moderate Muslim country that has become an Islamist dictatorship at the hands of [Turkish president] Recep Tayyip Erdoğan and his affiliated Muslim Brotherhood political party", arguing that it was "highly distasteful" that Erdoğan has requested Gülen's extradition from the United States while at the same time "... giving shelter to hundreds of leaders of the Muslim Brotherhood terrorist organisation and members of other bloody militant Islamist groups which attack Egypt by day and night".

Mahrous argues that not only has Erdoğan accused Gülen of plotting the failed coup, Erdoğan has also used this allegation as an excuse to engage in mass purges against public institutions allegedly loyal to Gülen. "(Simultaneously), Erdogan has decided to turn Turkey-Egypt relations into a media battleground, with Turkish intelligence providing funds for several Muslim Brotherhood TV channels that target Egypt". Mahrous stated that his advice to Gülen is to not wait until his extradition, but instead leave the US and obtain permanent asylum in Egypt. Former Egyptian President Anwar Sadat granted asylum to Shah Mohammad Reza Pahlavi after arriving the Egypt from the US, regardless of all the threats that were issued by Iran's ayatollahs during the Iranian Revolution.

==== Restoration of relations ====
In early 2020, the Egyptian military practices military drills in the Middle East as a show of force to Turkey according to Xinhuanet News. "It's [the military exercises] a message to the Turkish side to realize the capabilities of Egyptian army on battle ground," said Tariq Fahmy, a professor of international relations at Cairo University. In addition, the Egyptian naval forces conducted a large-scale amphibious exercise in the Mediterranean Sea amidst escalating tensions in the region after Turkey's parliament agreed to send military troops to Libya aimed at shoring up the UN-recognized government in Tripoli. Egypt's naval forces conducted activities in the Mediterranean Sea aimed at imposing maritime control on the country's economic zone and securing vital targets in deep water, according to a statement by the armed forces.

In March 2021, Turkey claimed said that they have resumed their diplomatic contacts with Egypt (at the level of intelligence and foreign ministries) after breaking off relations since 2013. However, the Egyptian Foreign Ministry denied these claims by the Turkish Government that there has been a restoration of ties. In the meantime, Turkey had ordered Muslim Brotherhood affiliated TV channels to halt criticisms against Egypt.

On 14 February 2024, President Erdoğan visited Egypt for the first time in 12 years and was welcomed by President al-Sisi, in which the pair signed several agreements. In September 2024, President El-Sisi visited Turkey, improving the ties between the two countries. They signed several agreements and held talks about the war in the Gaza strip. In February 2026, President Erdoğan visited Egypt, where he met with President El-Sisi to discuss regional issues and signed additional bilateral agreements, further strengthening relations.

== Cultural relations ==
External videos
- Turkish and Egyptian Classical dance part 1
- Turkish and Egyptian Classical dance part 2

Both the Egyptian and Turkish governments have decided to focus and co-operate on the common culture of the two countries.

== Resident diplomatic missions ==
- Egypt has an embassy in Ankara and a consulate-general in Istanbul.
- Turkey has an embassy in Cairo and a consulate-general in Alexandria.

== See also ==
- Foreign relations of Egypt
- Foreign relations of Turkey
- Turks in Egypt
- Baladi
- 2013 Egyptian coup d'état
- 2016 Turkish coup d'état
- Mediterraneanism
- Haplogroup J

== Bibliography ==
- J. Zürcher, Erik (2004), Turkey: A Modern History, Revised Edition, London: I.B. Tauris, ISBN 9781850433996
- Rubin, Barry; Kirisci, Kemal (2001), Turkey in World Politics: An Emerging Multiregional Power, Boulder, Colorado: Lynne Rienner Publishers, ISBN 978-1-55587-954-9
- Dawisha, Adeed (2009), Arab Nationalism in the Twentieth Century: From Triumph to Despair, Princeton: Princeton University Press, ISBN 978-0-691-10273-3
