= Haplogroup J =

Haplogroup J may refer to:

- Haplogroup J (mtDNA), a human mitochondrial DNA (mtDNA) haplogroup
- Haplogroup J (Y-DNA), a human Y-chromosome (Y-DNA) haplogroup
