= Hayrünnisa Gül =

First Lady of Turkey from 2007 to 2014

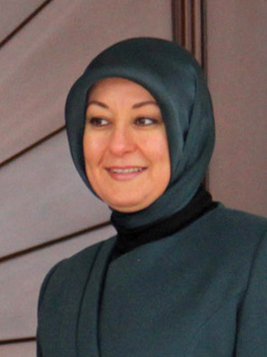
- Gül in 2013

First Lady of Turkey
- In role 28 August 2007 – 28 August 2014
- President: Abdullah Gül
- Preceded by: Semra Sezer
- Succeeded by: Emine Erdoğan

Spouse of the Prime Minister of Turkey
- In role 18 November 2002 – 14 March 2003
- Prime Minister: Abdullah Gül
- Preceded by: Rahşan Ecevit
- Succeeded by: Emine Erdoğan

Personal details
- Born: Hayrünnisa Özyurt; 18 August 1965 (age 60) Istanbul, Turkey
- Spouse: Abdullah Gül (m. 1980)
- Children: 3

Hayrünnisa Gül (pronounced [hajɾyˈnisa ˈɟyl]; née Özyurt, born 18 August 1965) served as the first lady of Turkey from 2007 to 2014, as the wife of Abdullah Gül.

== First Lady of Turkey ==
On 7 October 2010, Gül became the first First Lady to address the Parliamentary Assembly of the Council of Europe (PACE) on issues faced by children and women.

Gül has also publicly spoken out against the imposition of the head scarf in Islamic countries upon young females who cannot make judgment for themselves.

After seven years, on 28 August 2014, she left her office as first lady when Recep Tayyip Erdoğan became president. Afterward, she publicly responded to criticism in regards to her husband, saying she would start a "real intifada."

== Personal life ==
Gül has two sons namely Ahmed Münir and Mehmed Emre and one daughter, Kübra. Gül was the first hijab-wearing first lady in the history of the Republic of Türkiye since Atatürk's dress code.

== Awards and decorations ==
- 2012: (Netherlands) Grand Cross of the Order of the Crown
