= List of international prime ministerial trips made by Binali Yıldırım =

This is a list of international prime ministerial trips made by Binali Yıldırım, the 27th prime minister of Turkey during his premiership between 24 May 2016 and 9 July 2018. Yıldırım has made 28 visits to 21 countries in 2 years, his first trip being to Northern Cyprus on 1 June 2016.

== 2016 ==
Country	Areas visited	Date(s)	Ref.
Northern Cyprus	Nicosia	1 June 2016	
Azerbaijan	Baku	3 June 2016	
Russia	Moscow	6 December 2016	

== 2017 ==
Country	Areas visited	Date(s)	Ref.
Iraq	Baghdad	7 January 2017	
Malta	Valletta	17–18 February 2017	
Northern Cyprus	Nicosia	9 March 2017	
Moldova	Chișinău	5–6 May 2017	
United Kingdom	London	11 May 2017	
(Georgia (country)) Georgia	Tbilisi	23 May 2017	
Greece	Athens	19–20 June 2017	
Northern Cyprus	Nicosia	20 July 2017	
Singapore	Singapore	21–22 August 2017	
Vietnam	Hanoi	23–24 August 2017	
United States	Washington, D.C and New York City	8–10 November 2017	
United Kingdom	London	11 November 2017	
United Kingdom	London	26–27 November 2017	
South Korea	Busan, Seoul	5–7 December 2017	
Bangladesh	Dhaka	19 December 2017	
Azerbaijan	Nakhchivan	20 December 2017	
Saudi Arabia	Riyadh	27–28 December 2017	

== 2018 ==
Country	Areas visited	Date(s)	Ref.
Belarus	Minsk	14–15 February 2018	
Germany	Berlin	16–18 February 2018	
Azerbaijan	Baku	15–16 March 2018	
Bosnia and Herzegovina	Sarajevo	30 March 2018	
Mongolia	Ulaanbaatar	6 April 2018	
Afghanistan	Kabul	8 April 2018	
Spain	Madrid	24–25 April 2018	
