= Abdullah Gül =

President of Turkey from 2007 to 2014

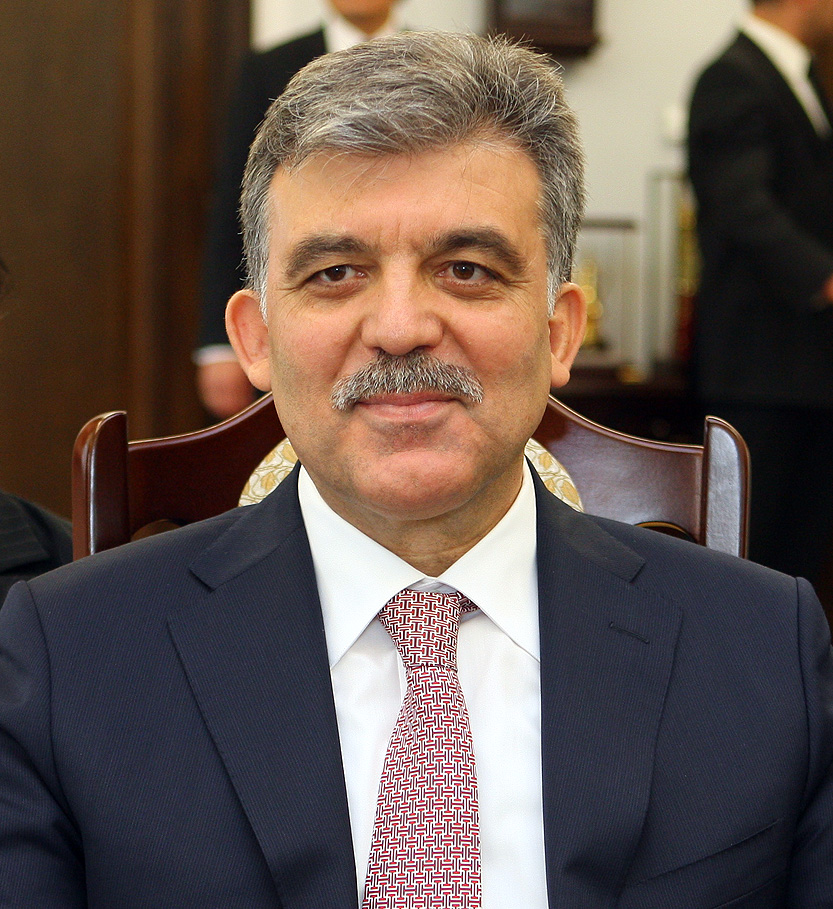
- Gül in 2011

11th President of Turkey
- In office 28 August 2007 – 28 August 2014
- Prime Minister: Recep Tayyip Erdoğan
- Preceded by: Ahmet Necdet Sezer
- Succeeded by: Recep Tayyip Erdoğan

24th Prime Minister of Turkey
- In office 18 November 2002 – 14 March 2003
- President: Ahmet Necdet Sezer
- Deputy: Abdüllatif Şener; Mehmet Ali Şahin; Ertuğrul Yalçınbayır
- Preceded by: Bülent Ecevit
- Succeeded by: Recep Tayyip Erdoğan

Deputy Prime Minister of Turkey
- In office 28 March 2003 – 28 August 2007
- Prime Minister: Recep Tayyip Erdoğan
- Served with: Abdüllatif Şener; Mehmet Ali Şahin
- Preceded by: Ertuğrul Yalçınbayır
- Succeeded by: Cemil Çiçek

Minister of Foreign Affairs
- In office 14 March 2003 – 28 August 2007
- Prime Minister: Recep Tayyip Erdoğan
- Preceded by: Yaşar Yakış
- Succeeded by: Ali Babacan

Minister of State
- In office 28 June 1996 – 30 June 1997
- Prime Minister: Necmettin Erbakan

Member of the Grand National Assembly
- In office 20 October 1991 – 28 August 2007
- Constituency: Kayseri (1991, 1995, 1999, 2002, 2007)

Personal details
- Born: 29 October 1950 (age 76) Kayseri, Turkey
- Party: Independent (2007–present)
- Other political affiliations: Welfare Party (1991–1998); Virtue Party (1998–2001); Justice and Development Party (2001–2007)
- Spouse: Hayrünnisa Özyurt (m. 1980)
- Children: 3
- Education: Istanbul University; University of Exeter
- Website: Official website

Abdullah Gül (Note: /ɡuːl/ GOOL, Turkish: [abduɫˈɫah ˈɟyl]) (born 29 October 1950) is a Turkish politician who served as the president of Turkey from 2007 to 2014. He previously served for four months as Prime Minister from 2002 to 2003, and concurrently served as both Deputy Prime Minister and as Foreign Minister between 2003 and 2007. He is currently a member of the Advisory Panel for the President of the Islamic Development Bank.

Advocating staunch Islamist political views during his university years, Gül became a Member of Parliament for Kayseri in 1991 and was re-elected in 1995, 1999, 2002, and 2007. Initially a member of the Islamist Welfare Party, Gül joined the Virtue Party in 1998 after the former was banned for anti-secular activities. When the party split into hardline Islamist and modernist factions in 2000, Gül joined fellow party member Recep Tayyip Erdoğan in advocating the need for reform and moderation. He ran against serving leader Recai Kutan for the Virtue Party leadership at a time when Erdoğan was banned from holding political office. As the candidate for the modernist camp, he came second with 521 votes while Kutan won 633. He co-founded the moderate Justice and Development Party (AKP) with Erdoğan in 2001 after the Virtue Party was shut down in the same year, while hardline conservative members founded the Felicity Party instead.

Gül became prime minister after the AKP won a landslide victory in the 2002 general election while Erdoğan was still banned from office. His government removed Erdoğan's political ban by March 2003, after which Erdoğan became an MP for Siirt in a by-election and took over as prime minister. Gül subsequently served as Minister of Foreign Affairs and Deputy Prime Minister until 2007. His subsequent bid for the Presidency drew strong and highly vocal opposition from ardent supporters of secularism in Turkey and was initially blocked by the Constitutional Court due to concerns over his Islamist political background. He was eventually elected Turkey's first president with a background in Islamic politics after the 2007 snap general election.

As president, Gül came under criticism for giving assent to controversial laws which have been regarded by the political opposition as unconstitutional. In June 2013, he signed a bill restricting alcohol consumption into law despite initially indicating a possible veto, which was seen as a contributing factor to sparking the Gezi Park protests. Other controversies included a law tightening internet regulation in 2013, a law increasing political control over the judiciary in 2014 designed to protect then Prime Minister Erdoğan and others from corruption charges and a law giving the National Intelligence Organization (MİT) controversial new powers also in 2014. Gül took a mediating approach during the Gezi Park anti-government protests and government corruption scandals.

== Early life and education ==
Gül was born in Kayseri, central Anatolia on 29 October 1950, the 27th anniversary of the establishment of the modern Turkish nation, also known as Republic Day in Turkey. His father, Ahmet Hamdi Gül (1926–2017), was a retired air force mechanic whilst his mother is Adviye Satoğlu (born 1931).

=== Education ===
Gül studied Economics at Istanbul University. During his graduate education, he spent two years (1976–1978) in London and studied at the University of Exeter in the United Kingdom. Returning to Turkey in 1978, he became an instructor in the Department of Industrial Engineering at Sakarya University while working on his doctoral research on Turkey's economic relations with other Muslim countries. He received his PhD from Istanbul University in 1983. Between 1983 and 1991, he worked at the Islamic Development Bank (IDB) in Jeddah, Saudi Arabia. He was conferred an honorary PhD degree from Amity University, Noida on 8 February 2009, and an LL.D from the University of Dhaka on 13 February 2010.

== Career ==
=== Entry into politics ===
Gül became acquainted with politics early during his high school years. During his university education, he became a member of the Islamist-nationalist Millî Türk Talebe Birliği (National Turkish Students' Union) in the line of Necip Fazıl's Büyük Doğu (Grand Orient) current.

He was elected a member of the Turkish parliament for the Refah Partisi (RP, "the Welfare Party") from the Kayseri electoral district in 1991 and 1995. During these years, he made statements about the political system of Turkey that was designed by Mustafa Kemal Atatürk and the Turkish National Movement, which included "This is the end of the republican period" and "The secular system has failed and we definitely want to change it". These statements caused controversy when his candidacy for the 2007 presidential election was announced by Prime Minister Recep Tayyip Erdoğan.

In 1999, he kept his seat as a member of the Fazilet Partisi (FP, "the Virtue Party") which was subsequently outlawed by the Constitutional Court for its violation of the Constitution. Its predecessor, the Refah Partisi, was also outlawed by the Constitutional Court for its violation of the Constitution, especially the principle of secularism. By this time, Gül had apparently moderated his views and was reportedly considered to be part of the Virtue Party's reformist faction. Since 1993 in Ankara, he had been organizing an informal think-tank involving a group of Refah politicians who were discontented with the leadership of Necmettin Erbakan: these included Melih Gökçek, Bülent Arınç, Abdüllatif Şener, Recep Tayyip Erdoğan and Beşir Atalay. In August 2001, this group founded the Adalet ve Kalkınma Partisi (Justice and Development Party), a party which billed itself as a moderate conservative party in the European tradition. He was elected once again to represent Kayseri in 2002.

An interview he gave in 2002 summarizes his criticisms of the Refah Partisi under the leadership of Necmettin Erbakan and his portrayal of the AKP as a moderate party:

In the Welfare Party, there were groups demanding sharia rule. Welfare did not represent the local values we are now cultivating. The ideology of the party was partially shaped by alien imports. [He was referring to the impact of the Islamist ideology of the Iranian Revolution and Arab states on Welfare's ideology.] Our vision was at odds with the rest of the party. The despotic rule of Erbakan Hoca made it impossible for us to realize our vision under the rubric of the National View. We believe that modernization and being Muslim complement each other. We accept the modern values of liberalism, human rights, and market economy.

=== Prime minister ===
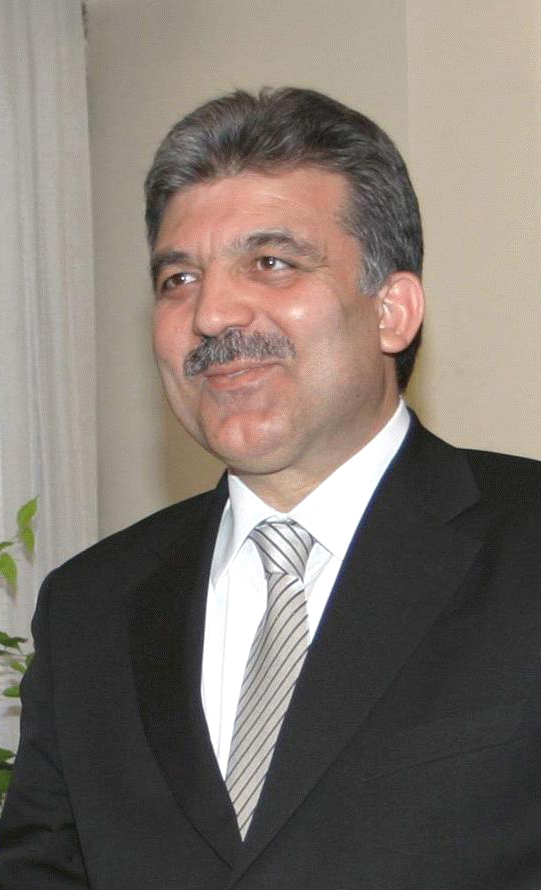
Abdullah Gül, Minister of Foreign Affairs and Deputy Prime Minister, 2004

After the Justice and Development Party (AKP) won the most votes in the November 2002 general election, Gül was appointed Prime Minister, as AKP leader Recep Tayyip Erdoğan was still banned from participating in politics. After Gül's government secured legislation allowing Erdoğan's return to politics, the latter took over as prime minister on 14 March 2003. Gül was appointed deputy prime minister and foreign minister.

During his term he also oversaw the parliamentary motion known as the 1 March Memorandum, which sought to authorize US forces to use Turkish territory for operations in the 2003 Iraq War.

=== Foreign minister ===
After becoming foreign minister in March 2003, Gül became the key player in Turkey's attempts to receive an accession date for the European Union and in its attempts to improve relations with Syria and maintaining its relationship with the Turkic-speaking countries of Central Asia and the Caucasus. On 8 January 2008, Gül flew to the United States to meet with U.S. President George W. Bush and U.S. Secretary of State Condoleezza Rice.

=== Presidency (2007–2014) ===
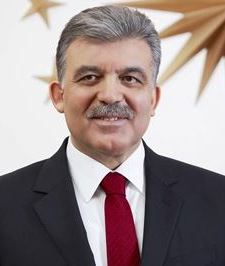
11th President Abdullah Gül

Prime Minister Erdoğan announced on 24 April 2007 that Gül would be the Justice and Development Party candidate in the 2007 presidential election. Previously, there had been speculation that Erdoğan himself would be the party's candidate, which had provoked substantial opposition from secularists. When a boycott of opposition parties in Parliament deadlocked the election process, Gül formally withdrew his candidacy on 6 May 2007. If elected he would be the first president to have been involved with Islamist parties. But a few days later, on 11 May 2007 when he inquired after the alterations to the Turkish constitution which now allowed the people to elect the president directly rather than a parliamentary vote, Gül announced that he was still intending to run.

Following the July 2007 parliamentary election, the AKP renominated Gül as its presidential candidate on 13 August; the election was again held as a vote of parliament. On 14 August, Gül submitted his candidacy application to parliament and expressed his commitment to secularism at a news conference.

On 28 August 2007, he was elected president in the third round of voting; in the first two rounds, a two-thirds majority of MPs had been required, but in the third round he needed only a simple majority. Gül was sworn in immediately thereafter. The process was a very low-key affair.

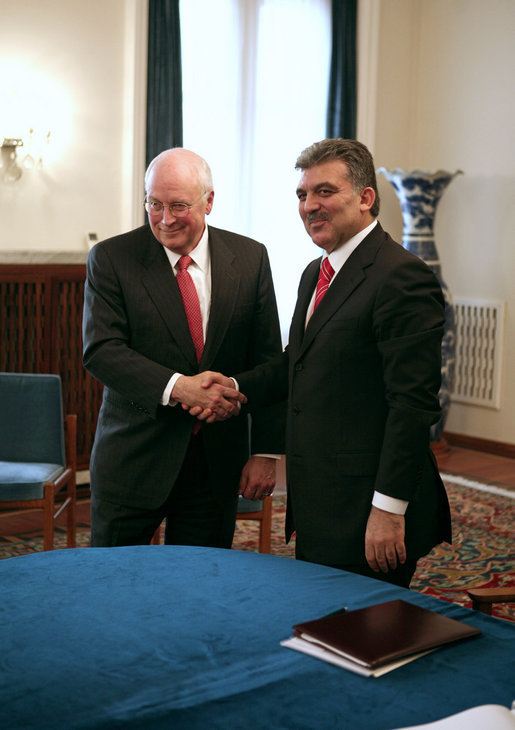
Gül with U.S. Vice President Dick Cheney, March 2008

Gül's swearing-in was not attended by the Chief of the Turkish General Staff and was boycotted by the opposition Republican People's Party; then the hand-over of power at the presidential palace was held behind closed doors. Gül's wife was not present. The traditional evening reception hosted by the new president at the presidential palace for the country's highest authorities was announced for 11:30 in the morning and wives were not invited.

His presidency was described as a "new era in Turkish politics", for being the first president of Turkey with a background in Islamic politics.

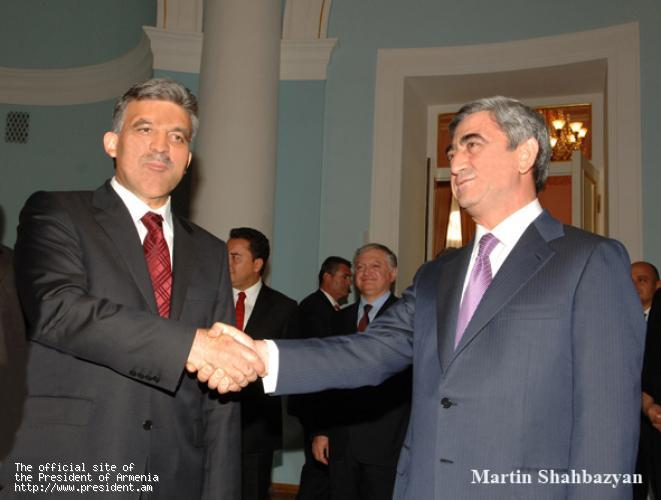
Gül with Armenian President Serzh Sargsyan, September 2008

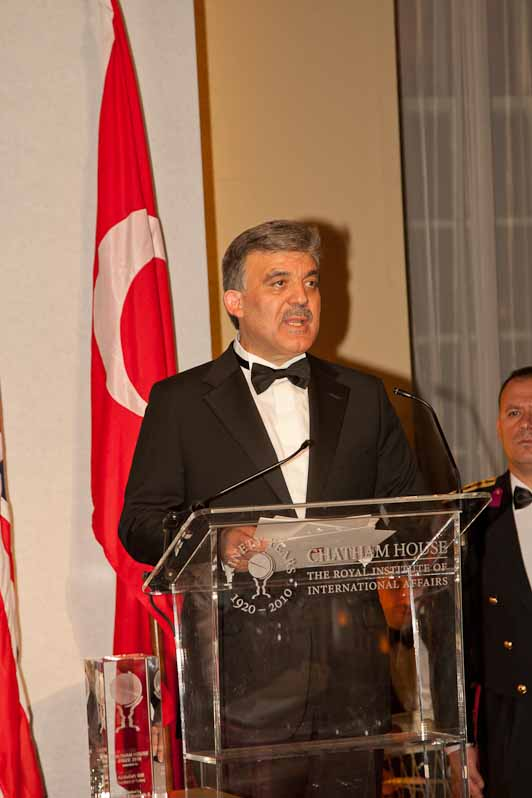
Abdullah Gül in 2010.

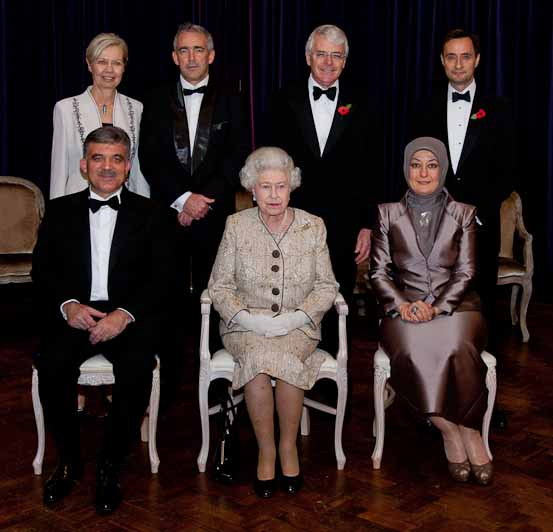
Gül awarded "Statesman of the Year" by Queen Elizabeth II, 2010.

Gül received messages of congratulation from the US, EU and German authorities while Turkey's prime minister Tayyip Erdoğan made a statement saying "a structure doomed to uncertainty has been overcome".

In September 2008 Gül became the first Turkish leader to visit Armenia where, in meetings with President Serzh Sarkisian, the two leaders formulated a solution to the tendentious problem of the genocide question, sparking a major debate in Turkey, but both the Armenian and Turkish parliaments refused to ratify the agreement. In November 2011, President Gül led a state visit to the United Kingdom as a guest of Queen Elizabeth II. The President met political and business leaders, visited the Olympic Park and was guest of honor at a state banquet at Buckingham Palace.

In November 2013, Gül called on Muslim countries to fight against what he called Islamophobia during his address at the 29th session of the COMCEC in Istanbul. He said:

Islamophobia remains a critical problem, which instigates unsubstantial prejudices against our region and Muslims. Terror plays a role in the persistence of such problems. We have to combat any form of deviation playing into the hands of people who equate terrorism with Islam, the religion of love, tolerance and conciliation.

=== Post-presidency (2014–present) ===
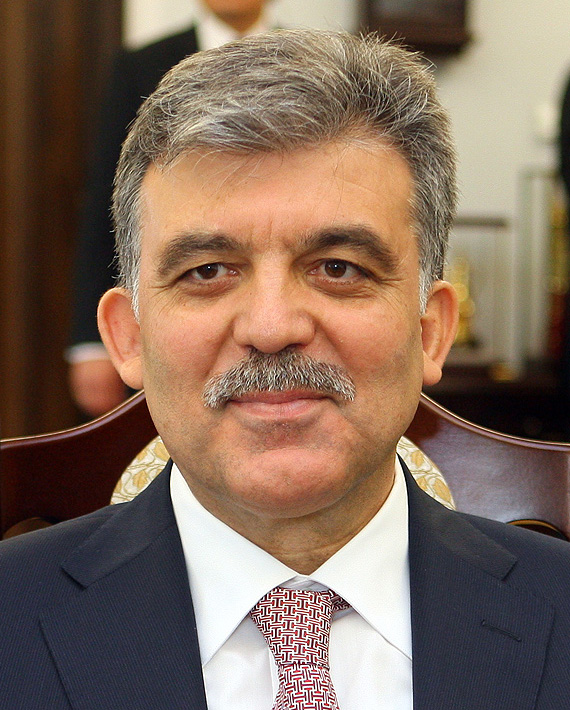
Abdullah Gül in 2011

After leaving office, Gül kept political silence, focusing mainly upon social and cultural issues, as well as charity. He had not announced his political judgements or expressed political support to any Turkish party or politician. However, amid an outbreak of political crysis and massive protests, caused by incarceration of Istanbul mayor Ekrem İmamoğlu allegedly initiated by the president Recep Tayyip Erdoğan, Abdullah Gül expressed his support to the former, stating: "Let us remember how the public conscience did not accept the injustices that were once committed against President Recep Tayyip Erdogan and me. Such mistakes should not be made against Ekrem Imamoglu, who was elected mayor by the people."

=== Statements on the Middle East ===
After the Israeli interdiction on the MV Mavi Marmara in 2010, when crewmembers attacked an Israeli naval boarding party, he advocated the complete ending of diplomatic relations with Israel, stating that "Israel will turn into a complete apartheid regime in the next 50 years if it does not allow for the establishment of an independent and proud Palestinian state with its capital in east Jerusalem. That is why we are exerting efforts to achieve a fair peace with a strategic point of view, which is to Israel's own interests."

On 31 December 2012, he stated with respect to the Arab spring and democratization of the Arab world: "But democracy is not only about elections. The task of creating essential democratic institutions – the rule of law, habits of accountability, gender equality, and freedom of expression and faith – still awaits these countries".

== Personal life ==
Gül married his 15-year-old child bride, Hayrünnisa Gül, when he was 30 years old, which would be illegal under current Turkish law.

== History of titles ==
- 1949–1983: Abdullah Gül
- 1983–1991: Dr. Abdullah Gül
- 1991–1996: Assoc. Prof. Dr. Abdullah Gül, MP
- 1996–1997: Assoc. Prof. Dr. Abdullah Gül, Minister of State of Turkey
- 2002: His Excellency Assoc. Prof. Dr. Abdullah Gül, Prime Minister of Turkey
- 2002–2007: His Excellency Assoc. Prof. Dr. Abdullah Gül, Deputy Prime Minister and Minister of Foreign Affairs of Turkey
- 2007–2014: His Excellency Assoc. Prof. Dr. Abdullah Gül, President of the Republic of Turkey

== Honors and medals ==
=== National honors ===
Ribbon bar	Award or decoration	Country	Date	Place	Note	Ref.
	Medal of Honor of the Republic of Turkey	Turkey	28 August 2014	Ankara		

=== Foreign honors ===
Ribbon bar	Award or decoration	Country	Date	Place	Note	Ref.
	Pro Merito medal by European Council	European Union	2002	Brussels		
	Member 1st Class Order of Abdulaziz Al Saud	Saudi Arabia	9 November 2007	Ankara	The order was named after Abdulaziz Al Saud.	
	Honorary Knight Grand Cross of the Order of the Bath	United Kingdom	13 May 2008	Ankara	British order of chivalry.	
	Medal "10 years of Astana"	Kazakhstan	4 July 2008	Astana		
	Grand Cordon of the Order of Independence	Qatar	17 August 2009	Istanbul		
	Grand Collar of the Order of Prince Henry	Portugal	12 May 2009	Ankara	Portuguese National Order of Knighthood.	
	Knight Grand Cross with Collar of the Order of Merit of the Italian Republic	Italy	17 November 2009	Ankara	The highest ranking honor of the Italian Republic	
	Collar of the Order of Mubarak the Great	Kuwait	21 December 2009	Kuwait City		
	2010 Chatham House Prize	United Kingdom	20 March 2010	London	Gul awarded "Statesman of the Year" by Queen Elizabeth II.	
	Grand Cordon of the Order of Valourf	Cameroon	16 March 2010	Yaoundé	Second highest order in Cameroon.	
	Nishan-e-Pakistan	Pakistan	31 March 2010	Islamabad	Pakistan's highest civil order.	
	Grand Cross with Chain Order of Merit of the Republic of Hungary	Hungary	15 November 2011	Ankara	The highest state order and second class of Hungary.	
	Knight Grand Cross of the Order of the Netherlands Lion	The Netherlands	16 April 2012	Amsterdam	Netherlands' Lion, established in 1815.	
	Recipient of the Order of the Golden Eagle	Kazakhstan	11 October 2012	Ankara	The highest decoration of Kazakhstan.	
	Knight of the Order of the Seraphim	Sweden	11 March 2013	Stockholm	The highest order awarded by Swedish Royalty	
	Member of St. George's Order of Victory	Georgia	19 April 2013	Ankara	Second highest state decoration awarded by President of Georgia.	
	Recipient of the Star of President Order	Turkmenistan	29 May 2013	Ashgabat	The first order given to foreign president in Turkmenistan.	
	Grand Cross with Collar of Order of St. Olav	Norway	5 November 2013	Ankara	The highest ranking honor of the Kingdom of Norway.	
	Recipient of the Heydar Aliyev Order	Azerbaijan	12 November 2013	Ankara	The highest national order of Azerbaijan.	
	Knight of the Order of the Gold Lion of the House of Nassau	Luxembourg	18 November 2013	Ankara	The highest national order in Luxembourg.	
	Magtymguly International Prize	Turkmenistan	3 June 2014	Ankara		
	Recipient of the Order of the State of Northern Cyprus	Northern Cyprus	19 July 2014	Northern Nicosia	The highest national order in Turkish Republic of Northern Cyprus.	
	Recipient of the Order of Danaker	Kyrgyzstan	8 September 2014	Istanbul	The highest national order in Kyrgyzstan.	

== See also ==
- Çankaya Köşkü
- List of presidential trips made by Abdullah Gül
- Abdullah Gül University
- Abdullah Gül Interchange

== Notes ==
Party political offices
New office	Deputy Leader of the Justice and Development Party; 2001–2007	Succeeded by Cemil Çiçek
Political offices
Preceded by Bülent Ecevit	Prime Minister of Turkey; 2002–2003	Succeeded by Recep Tayyip Erdoğan
Preceded by Mehmet Ali Şahin	First Deputy Prime Minister of Turkey; 2003–2007	Succeeded by Cemil Çiçek
Preceded by Yaşar Yakış	Minister of Foreign Affairs; 2003–2007	Succeeded by Ali Babacan
Preceded by Ahmet Necdet Sezer	President of Turkey; 2007–2014	Succeeded by Recep Tayyip Erdoğan
