= Foreign policy of the Recep Tayyip Erdoğan government =

Turkish foreign policy

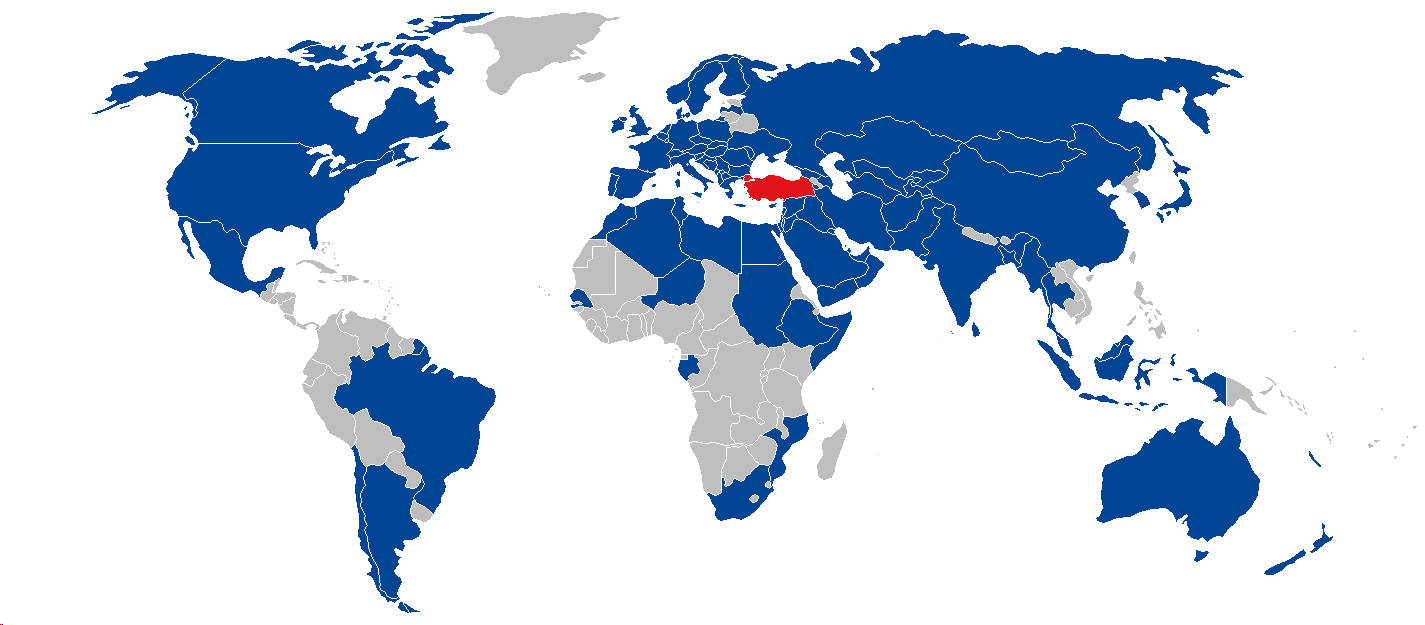
Map of international trips made by Recep Tayyip Erdoğan as prime minister: Visited countries Turkey

The foreign policy of the Recep Tayyip Erdoğan government concerns the policy initiatives made by Turkey towards other states under Recep Tayyip Erdoğan during his tenure as prime minister from 2003 to 2014.

== Background ==
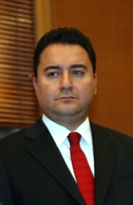
Former Minister of Foreign Affairs of the Erdoğan government, Ali Babacan (2007-2009)

=== History ===
The European Union and NATO are the main fixtures and the main elements of continuity in Turkish foreign policy. "Turkey experienced the direct impact of the post-Cold War atmosphere of insecurity, which resulted in a variety of security problems in Turkey's neighborhood. The most urgent issue for Turkish diplomacy, in this context, was to harmonize Turkey's influential power axes with the new international environment."

"During the Cold War, Turkey was a "wing country" under NATO's strategic framework, resting on the geographic perimeter of the Western alliance. NATO's strategic concept, however, has evolved in the post-Cold War era and so has Turkey's calculation of its strategic environment. Turkey's presence in Afghanistan is an example of this change." Turkey's involvement in NATO has increased during this government. Turkey also has advanced considerably in the European integration process compared with the previous decade, when it was not even clear whether the EU was seriously considering Turkey's candidacy.

Turkey has been building relations with its neighbors (including Iran and Syria), under a doctrine called 'zero troubles with neighbors'. These developments worried some Western observers that Turkey, frustrated by its stalled EU accession drive among other things, is seeking to recalibrate its foreign policy, not just by moving closer to the Muslim world but also by turning away from the West. Members of the government rejected these claims.

=== Doctrine ===
Turkish foreign policy under the AKP administration has been associated with the name of Ahmet Davutoğlu. Davutoğlu was the chief foreign policy advisor of Prime Minister Recep Tayyip Erdoğan before he was appointed foreign minister in 2009. As an academic, he has outlined his foreign policy doctrine in several writings, most important of which is his book Strategic Depth. The implementation of Davutoğlu's foreign policy doctrine has contributed to a transformation of Turkish foreign policy and the rising importance of Turkey's diplomatic role, especially in the Middle East. While his doctrine is often dubbed as neo-Ottomanism, the use of this term is rather misleading. Ottomanism was a nineteenth-century liberal political movement aiming to the formation of a civic Ottoman national identity overarching ethnic, linguistic and religious identities. The term was briefly reinstated as "neo-Ottomanism" to characterize the foreign policy overtures of Turgut Özal in the late 1980s. While these involved increased interest in the Middle East, they share little of the conceptual content of Davutoğlu's vision. Davutoğlu's professor and close adviser of former president Turgut Özal, Greek geopolitician Dimitri Kitsikis has had a decisive influence on his geopolitical theory.

Although geopolitics still comprises a key framework of Davutoğlu's strategic thinking, it is supplemented by liberal elements, such as soft power, conflict resolution and promotion of "win-win" solutions. In his book "Strategic Depth," published in 2001, Davutoğlu elaborates on his strategic vision about Turkey. He argues that Turkey possesses "strategic depth" due to its history and geographic position and lists Turkey among a small group of countries which he calls "central powers". Turkey should not be content with a regional role in the Balkans or the Middle East, because it is not a regional but a central power. Hence, it should aspire to play a leading role in several regions, which could award it global strategic significance. In Davutoğlu's view, Turkey is a Middle Eastern, Balkan, Caucasian, Central Asian, Caspian, Mediterranean, Gulf and Black Sea country, can simultaneously exercise influence in all these regions and thus claim a global strategic role. In view of these, he rejects the perception of Turkey as a bridge between Islam and the West, as this would relegate Turkey to an instrument for the promotion of the strategic interests of other countries.

Davutoğlu identifies two conditions for Turkey to succeed in its global strategic ambitions. The first refers to its domestic politics, while the second to its relations with neighbours. On the domestic front, Turkey needs to resolve its own Kurdish question, as well as bridge the growing rift between the Islamist and secularist elements of Turkish society. Davutoğlu advocates the resolution of both conflicts on the basis of liberal principles: Turkey's strategic potential will be released if a fair and lasting solution for the Kurdish issue is reached, which will guarantee Kurdish minority rights within Turkey and a liberal consensus is achieved on the question of secularism between different segments of Turkish society. On the international front, Davutoğlu argues that Turkey needs to resolve all the bilateral disputes which have hampered its relations with its neighbours. In what was coined as "zero problem policy with neighbours," he states that in recent decades Turkey has wasted crucial efforts and time in conflicts with its neighbours. For Turkey to become a regional leader and play a global strategic role, it needs to overcome phobic syndromes and establish cordial relations with all its neighbours. Its foreign policy should aim to resolve all the pending disputes which Turkey's diplomatic inertia had accumulated in the past, so it can seek its own global strategic role.

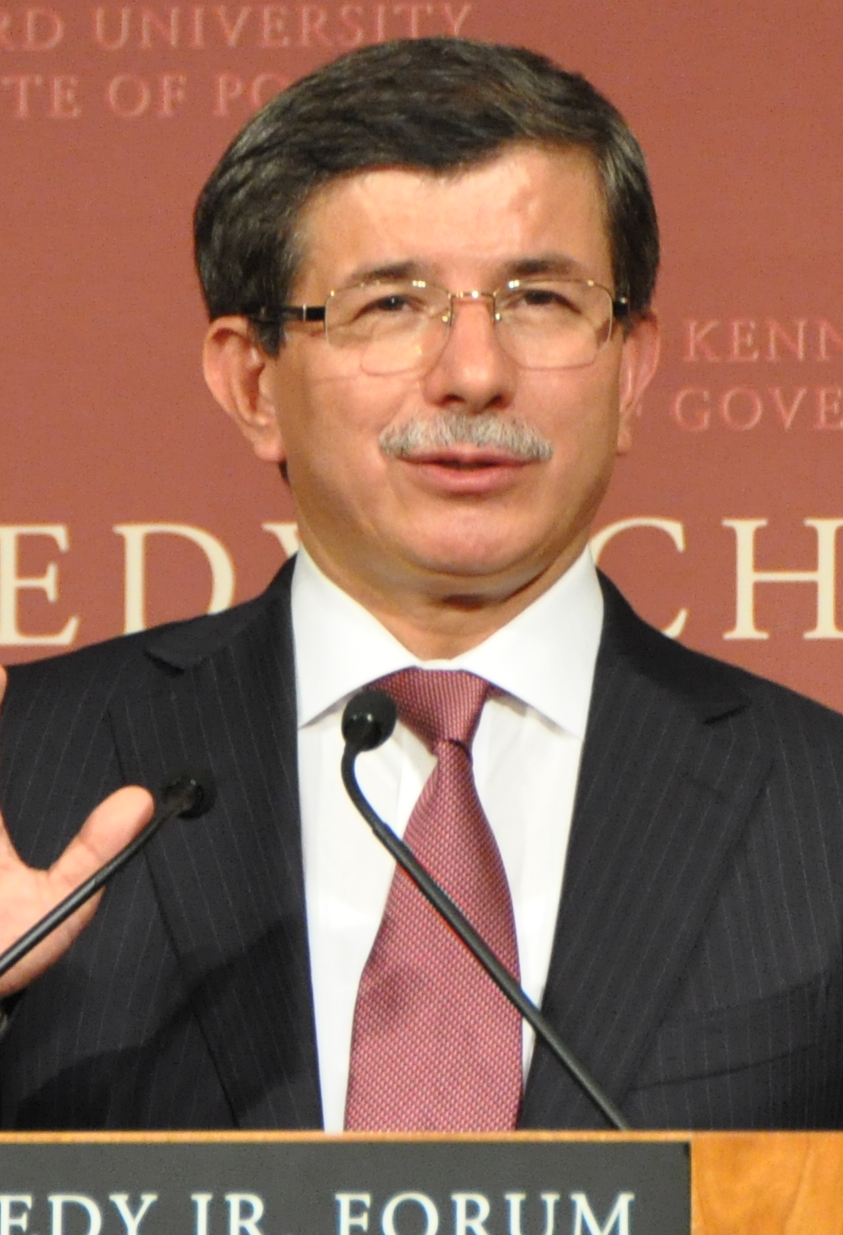
Ahmet Davutoğlu, the former prime minister

Developing closer relations with countries such as China, India, Russia and Brazil was identified as an important part of this process. Greater involvement in intercivilisational and interreligious dialogue was also designated as one a foreign policy priority, drawing on Turkey's historical and cultural ties.

=== Future ===
The "2023 vision" of the government, to mark the Turkish Republic's centennial, was formulated by Davutoğlu as follows:

First, Turkey aims to achieve all EU membership conditions and become an influential EU member state by 2023. Second, it will continue to strive for regional integration, in the form of security and economic cooperation. Third, it will seek to play an influential role in regional conflict resolution. Fourth, it will vigorously participate in all global arenas. Fifth, it will play a determining role in international organizations and become one of the top 10 largest economies in the world. To achieve them, Turkey must make progress in all directions and in every field, take an interest in every issue related to global stability, and contribute accordingly.

== Africa ==
=== Somalia ===
Erdoğan's administration maintains strong ties with the Somali government. In 2011, the Turkish authorities announced that Turkey would reopen its embassy in Somalia. The Somali federal government also maintains an embassy in Ankara, Turkey's capital.

During the drought of 2011, Erdoğan's administration contributed over $201 million to humanitarian relief efforts in the impacted parts of Somalia. Following a greatly improved security situation in Mogadishu in mid-2011, the Turkish government also re-opened its foreign embassy with the intention of more effectively assisting in the post-conflict development process. It was among the first foreign administrations to resume formal diplomatic relations with Somalia after the civil war.

Additionally, Turkish Airlines became the first long-distance international commercial airline in two decades to land at Mogadishu's Aden Adde International Airport. As of March 2012, the flag carrier offers two flights a week from the Somali capital to Istanbul.

In partnership with the Somali government, Turkish officials have also launched various development and infrastructure projects in Somalia. They have assisted in the building of several hospitals, and helped renovate and rehabilitate the Aden Adde International Airport and the National Assembly building, among other initiatives.

== Americas ==
=== Brazil ===
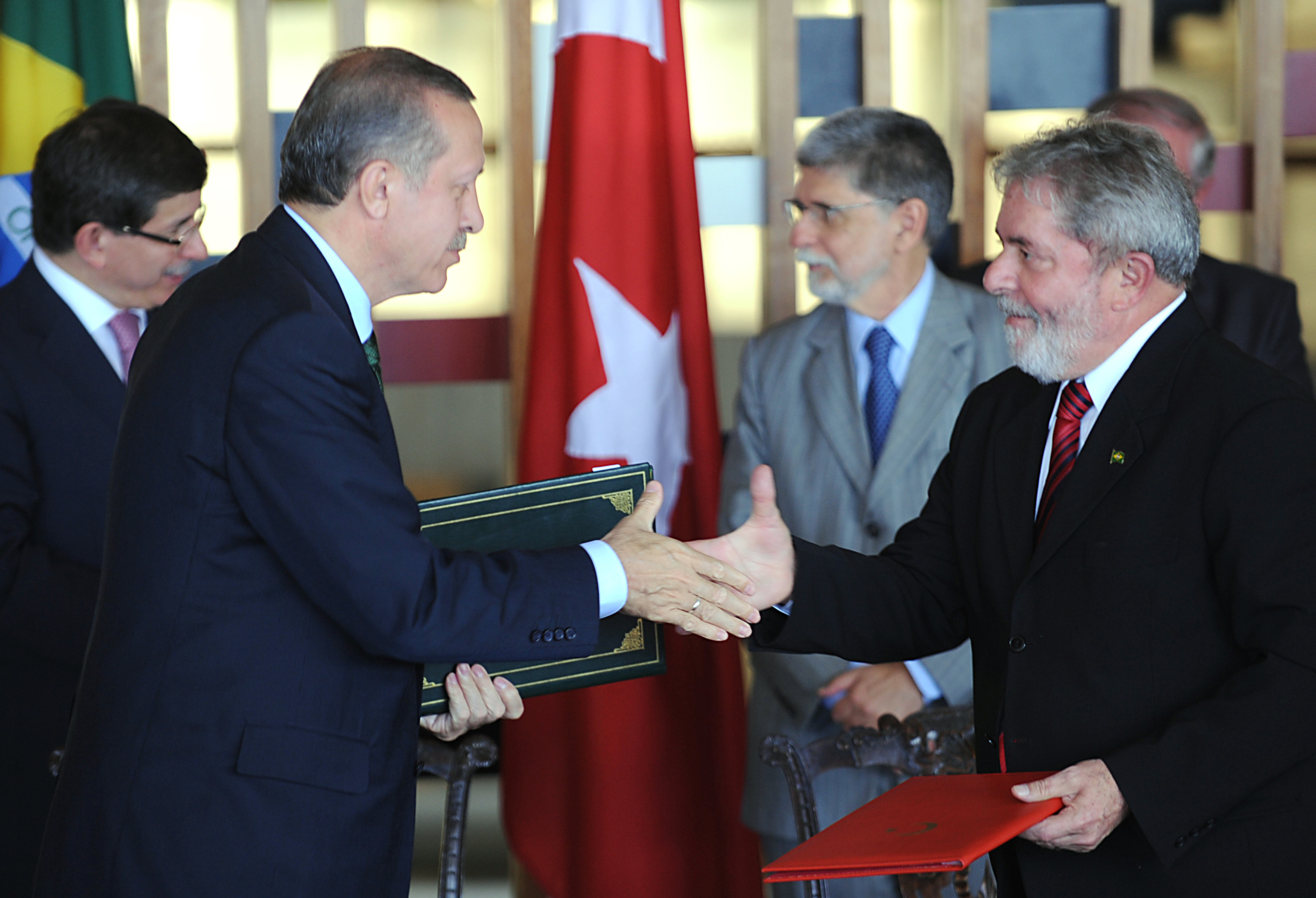
Recep Tayyip Erdogan and Brazilian President Luiz Inácio Lula da Silva

In May 2009, Brazilian president Luiz Inácio Lula da Silva visited to Turkey after visiting China and Saudi Arabia as part of his three-nation tour. In 2010, Erdoğan became the first Turkish prime minister ever to visit Brazil. He said that a new period started between Turkey and Brazil. During his visit to Brazil, Erdoğan received by Brazilian businessmen the medal of São Paulo's Industry Federation over his contributions to industry.

In 2009, direct flights of Turkish Airlines started from São Paulo to Istanbul. The Turkish Government encourages Turkish businessmen to form "Business Councils" and to participate in trade fairs and exhibitions in Latin America and the Caribbean. Turkish-Brazilian Business Council was established on the occasion of the visit of the former minister of foreign affairs, Abdullah Gül to Brazil in January 2006.

On 16 May 2010, after 17 hours of talks in Tehran, ministers from Brazil, Iran and Turkey had reached an agreement on the "principles" to revive a stalled nuclear fuel-swap deal backed by the United Nations. With the agreement signed by Turkish foreign minister Ahmet Davutoglu, Iranian foreign minister Manuchehr Motaki and Brazilian foreign minister Celso Amorim, Iran is committed to give the 1200 kg of 3.5% enriched uranium to Turkey in exchange for 20% enriched uranium it will receive from Western countries to be used as fuel in the nuclear research reactor in Tehran.

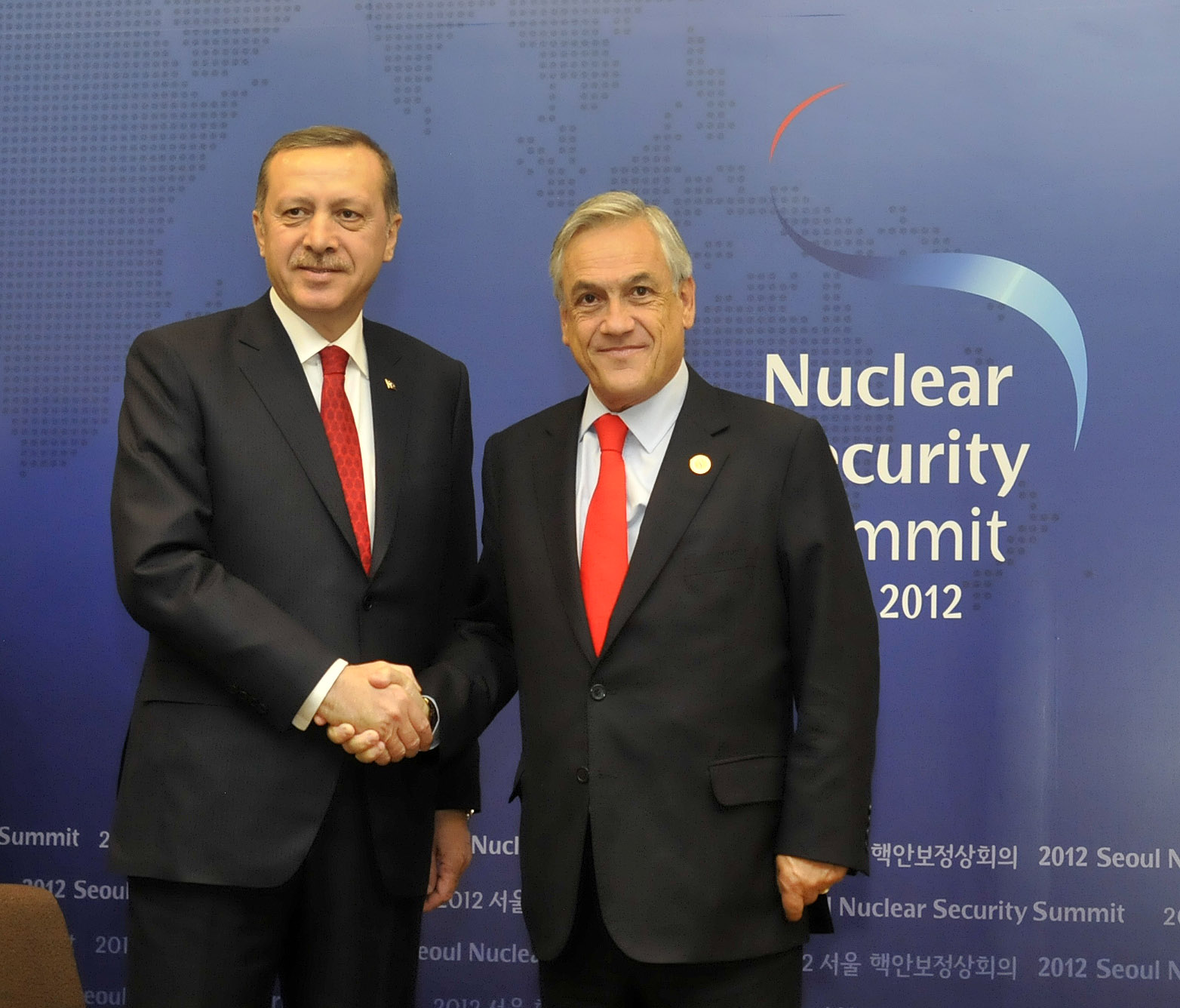
Prime Minister Erdogan and Chilean President Sebastián Piñera in Nuclear Security Summit, March 2012.

"We did everything (the West) wanted and everything we could, now they have to say clearly whether they want to build peace or if they want to build conflict -- Turkey and Brazil are for peace," President Lula said.

=== Chile ===
On 14 July 2009, Turkey signed a Free Trade Agreement (FTA) with Chile in Santiago. Erdoğan became the first Turkish prime minister to visit Chile.

Declaration of the year 2006 as the "Year of Latin America and the Caribbean" in Turkey gave further impetus to Turkey's "Action Plan for Latin America and the Caribbean". Ministers of Foreign Affairs, Industry, Trade and Economy, representatives of the business organizations and academicians from the region as well as the Honorary Consuls in the region were invited to a series of events during "the Latin American and Caribbean Week", which was organized in Istanbul and Ankara between 5–11 June 2006.

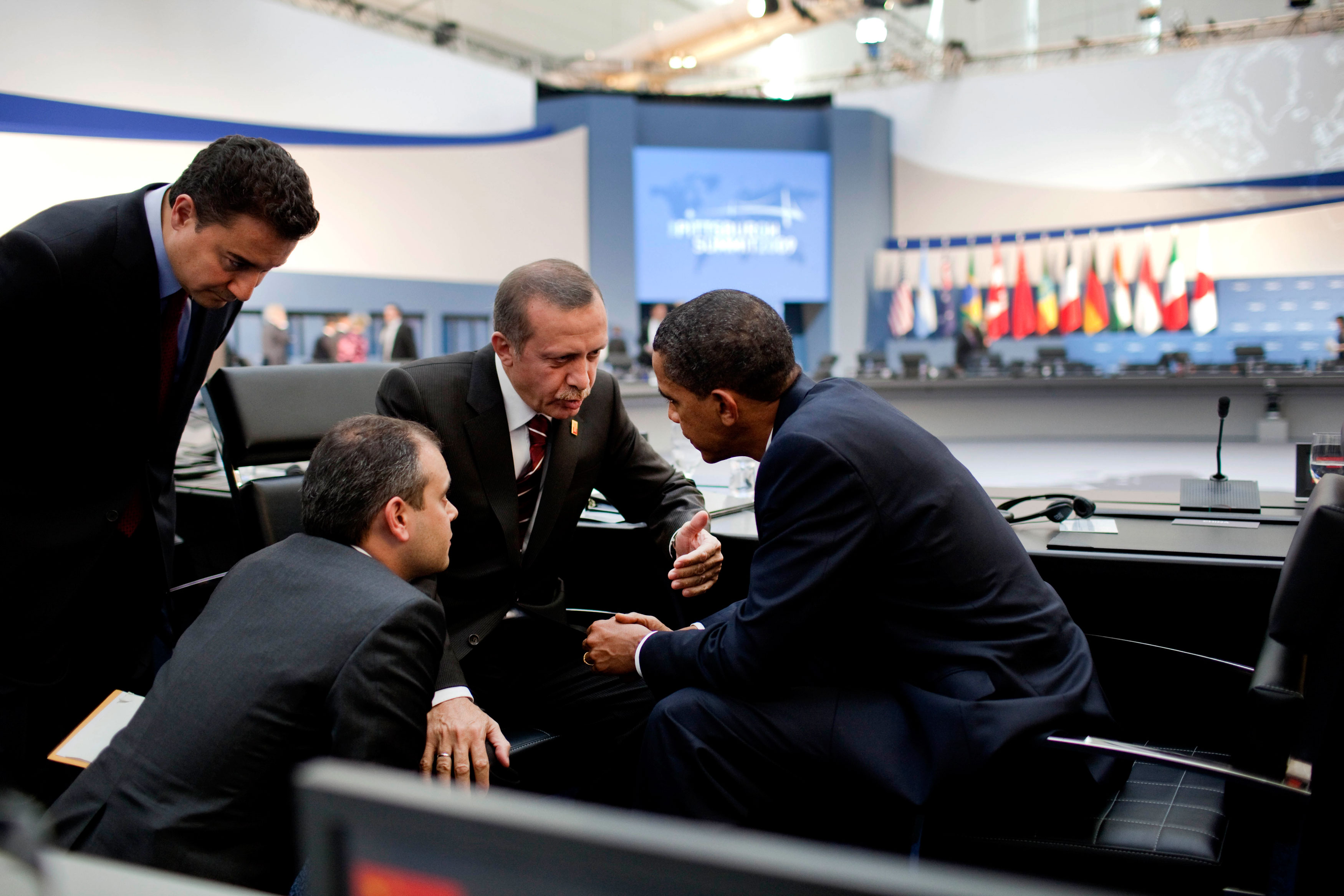
Recep Tayyip Erdogan and U.S. President Barack Obama following the G-20 Summit afternoon session

=== United States ===
When Barack Obama became President of United States, he made his first overseas trip to Turkey in April 2009.

At a joint news conference in Turkey, Obama said: "I'm trying to make a statement about the importance of Turkey, not just to the United States but to the world. I think that where there's the most promise of building stronger U.S.-Turkish relations is in the recognition that Turkey and the United States can build a model partnership in which a predominantly Christian nation, a predominantly Muslim nation -- a Western nation and a nation that straddles two continents," he continued, "that we can create a modern international community that is respectful, that is secure, that is prosperous, that there are not tensions -- inevitable tensions between cultures -- which I think is extraordinarily important."

== Europe ==
=== Armenia ===
Turkey was among the first countries in the world to recognize the state of Armenia after its independence in 1991. After Armenia supported the Armenians of Nagorno-Karabakh in their bid for independence, Turkey sided with its Turkic ally Azerbaijan over the First Nagorno-Karabakh War by closing its borders with Armenia. Since then, the border remains closed.

In 2005, international airspace between Armenia and Turkey was reopened. On 21 February 2008, President Abdullah Gül sent a message of congratulations to the newly elected Armenian president Serzh Sargsyan and said "that he hoped the victory of Sargsyan in Armenia's presidential election would lead to a normalization of relations between their estranged countries." In reaction, Armenian president Sargsyan invited Gül to attend a FIFA World Cup qualifier football match between the Turkish and Armenian national football teams. After accepting the invitation, President Gül became the first Turkish head of state to visit Armenia on 3 September 2008. This "football diplomacy" and new dialogue resulted in the signing of protocols between Turkish and Armenian foreign ministers in Switzerland to improve relations between the two countries.

The Armenian Constitutional Court decided that the protocols "cannot be interpreted or applied in the legislative process and application practice of the Republic of Armenia as well as in the interstate relations in a way that would contradict the provisions of the preamble to the RA Constitution and the requirements of Paragraph 11 of the Declaration of Independence of Armenia." Turkey said that Armenian court's ruling on the protocols is not acceptable. The parliament of Armenia and Turkey decided for the suspension of the ratification process.

Between May 2005 and October 2006, the Turkish Ministry of Culture financed the restoration of an old Armenian church located in an eastern Turkish province. The restoration had a stated budget of 2 million Turkish lira (approximately US$1.4 million). On 19 September 2010, a religious ceremony was held at this historical Armenian church after permission of the Turkish government for the first time in 95 years. It is opened to worshippers allowing to worship once a year for a single day.

=== European Union ===
Erdoğan was named by the newspaper European Voice the "European of the Year 2004" for the reforms in his country. Erdoğan said in a comment that "Turkey's accession shows that Europe is a continent where civilisations reconcile and not clash."

On 3 October 2005, the negotiations for Turkey's accession to the EU formally started during Erdoğan's tenure as prime minister.

Erdoğan's government is not unconditionally pro-European. The European Commission generally supports Erdoğan's reforms, but remains critical of his policies. Negotiations about a possible EU membership came to a standstill in 2009 and 2010, when Turkish ports were closed to Cypriot ships. The Turkish government continues its refusal to recognize EU member state Cyprus. Furthermore, fundamental rights remain an issue in Turkey. A law establishing the Turkish National Human Rights Institution was adopted by the Turkish parliament, but the law does not comply fully with the UN Paris principles on human rights institutions. In a report that the European Commission presented in 2012 about a possible Turkish accession to the European Union, the commission specifically mentioned the lack of freedom of expression, freedom of thought, conscience and religion, freedom of assembly, access to independent and impartial justice, children’s rights, and trade union rights as areas where the Turkish government needs to implement reforms. Freedom of the media continued to be further restricted in practice, according to the report. No progress was made on anti-discrimination policies, such as discrimination against homosexuals. The position of socially vulnerable persons and/or persons with disabilities, torture in prisons and the issue of violence to women in relationships outside marriage, as well as early and forced marriages, also remain concerns, according to the report.

=== Greece and Cyprus ===
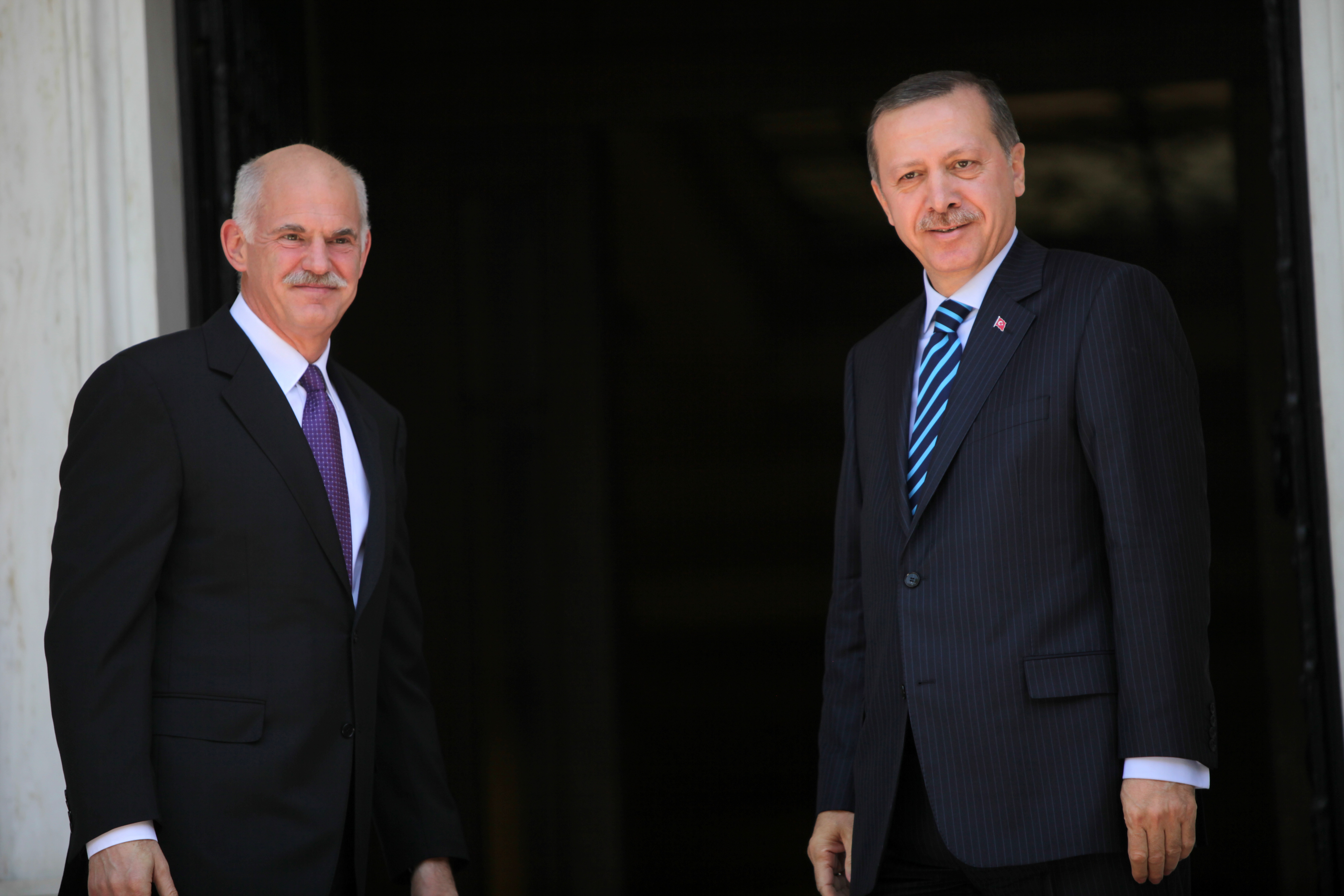
Erdoğan with Greek prime minister George Papandreou in Athens on 14 May 2010

During Erdoğan's prime ministership, relations with Greece have been normalized. Political and economic relations are much improved. In 2007, Prime Minister Erdoğan and Greek prime minister Kostas Karamanlis met on the bridge over the Evros River at the border between Greece and Turkey, for the inauguration of the Greek-Turkish natural gas pipeline, linking the longtime Aegean rivals through a project that will give Caspian gas its first direct Western outlet and help ease Russia's energy dominance.

Turkey and Greece signed an agreement to create a Combined Joint Operational Unit within the framework of NATO to participate in Peace Support Operations.

Erdogan and his party strongly supported the EU backed referendum of Cyprus, 2004 to reunify the island. Negotiations about a possible EU membership came to a standstill in 2009 and 2010, when Turkish ports were closed to Cypriot ships. The Turkish government continues its refusal to recognize EU member state Cyprus.

The Ecumenical Patriarchate in Istanbul continued to seek to reopen the Halki seminary on the island of Heybeli in the Sea of Marmara. The seminary was closed in 1971 when the patriarchate, to avoid the seminary being administered by the state, chose not to fulfill a government requirement for all private institutions of higher learning to nationalize. Prime Minister Erdoğan and Greek prime minister Papandreou are working together to improve the rights of Christians in Turkey and Muslims in Greece. It is expected that the Greeks will open the first legal mosque in Athens and the Turks will open the Halki seminary in Istanbul.

=== Russia ===
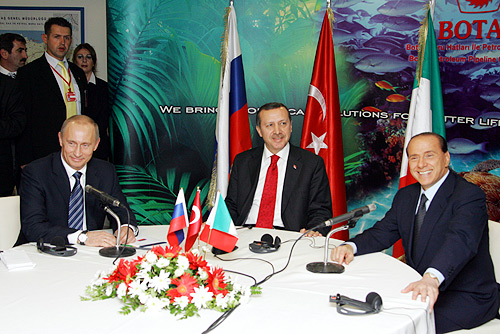
Erdogan's trilateral meeting with Russian President Vladimir Putin and Italian Prime Minister Silvio Berlusconi in Turkey

For centuries, Turkey and Russia have been rivals for regional supremacy. With the rise of the Erdoğan government, relations have somewhat normalized. Accordingly, co-operation rather than rivalry appears to dominate the ties.

In 2002, trade between Turkey and Russia was worth some $5 billion. By the end of 2010, this figure reached almost $30 billion.

In December 2004, Russian president Vladimir Putin visited Turkey. This was the first presidential visit in the history of Turkish-Russian relations besides that of the chairman of the Presidium, Nikolai Podgorny in 1972. In November 2005, Putin attended together with the inauguration of a jointly constructed Blue Stream natural gas pipeline in Turkey. This sequence of top-level visits has brought several important bilateral issues to the forefront. The two countries consider it their strategic goal to achieve "multidimensional co-operation", especially in the fields of energy, transport and the military. Specifically, Russia aims to invest in Turkey's fuel and energy industries, and it also expects to participate in tenders for the modernization of Turkey's military.

President Medvedev described Turkey as "one of our most important partners with respect to regional and international issues." He continued "We can confidently say that Russian-Turkish relations have advanced to the level of a multidimensional strategic partnership."

On 12 May 2010, Ankara and Moscow signed 17 agreements to enhance cooperation in energy and other fields, including pacts to build Turkey's first nuclear power plant and furthering plans for an oil pipeline from the Black Sea to the Mediterranean Sea. The leaders of both countries have also signed an agreement on visa-free travel. Tourists will be able to get into the country for free and stay there for up to 30 days. Russia later ended visa-free travel because of the 2015 Russian Sukhoi Su-24 shootdown.

=== Spain ===
The Alliance of Civilizations which is intended to respond to the need for a committed effort by the international community, both at the institutional and civil society levels, to bridge divides and overcome prejudice, misconceptions, misperceptions, and polarization which potentially threaten world peace, was initiated by Prime Minister José Luis Rodriguez Zapatero of Spain, co-sponsored by Prime Minister Recep Tayyip Erdogan of Turkey.

During the visit of Prime Minister Zapatero to Turkey in November 2006, on the occasion of the Alliance of Civilizations initiative, a Strategy Paper aimed at further strengthening Turkish-Spanish bilateral relations was signed by the two prime ministers.

== Middle East ==
=== Egypt ===
Turkey's prime minister Erdoğan was the first world leader to call for Egyptian leader Hosni Mubarak to heed the people's demands and leave his post to pave the way for a more democratic regime during the 2011 Egyptian revolution. Erdoğan gave a speech to the members of the ruling AKP, which was broadcast live by some Arabic TV channels, including Al Jazeera.

From here, I would like to make a very sincere suggestion to Egyptian President Mr. Husni Mubarak and caution him: We are human beings. We are mortal. We are not immortal. We will all die and be questioned for what we have done in our lives. As Muslims, we will all end up in two-cubic meter holes. We are all mortals. What is immortal is the legacy we leave behind; what is important is to be remembered with respect; it is to be remembered with benediction. We exist for the people. We fulfil our duties for our people. When the imam comes to us as we die, he will not address us as the head of state, as the prime minister, or as the minister. I am now talking to the trillionaires: the imam will not address you as trillionaires. He will address us all as simple men or women. What will come with you will only be the shroud. Nothing else. Therefore we must know the value of that shroud; we must listen to the voice of our conscience and to the voice of our people; we must be ready either for our people’s prayers or for their malediction. Therefore, I say that you must listen, and we must listen, to the people’s outcry, to their extremely humanitarian demands. Meet the people’s desire for change with no hesitation. In our world today, freedoms can no longer be postponed or ignored.

On 6 June 2011, Erdogan said in a meeting with the delegation of representatives of Egypt's young revolutionaries, who were visiting Turkey, that democracy guaranteed rights and basic freedoms, especially for women and children and that they should select a president with characteristics like honesty and sincerity, so that the people will gain a lot of support.

After the ousting of President Hosny Mubarak, the Turkish prime minister Recep Tayyip Erdoğan made his first 3 days official visit to Egypt on 12 September 2011, accompanied by six ministers and about 200 businessmen. This visit was considered a diplomatic success. Erdoğan's historic visit to Egypt was met with much enthusiasm by Egyptians. Even though it was midnight, Cairo traffic was reported to be jammed as thousands rushed to welcome the Turkish prime minister with Turkish flags. CNN reported some Egyptians saying "We consider him as the Islamic leader in the Middle East", while others were appreciative of his role in supporting Gaza. Erdogan was later honored in Tahrir Square by members of the Egyptian Revolution Youth Union, and members of the Turkish embassy were presented with a coat of arms in acknowledgement of the prime minister's support of the Egyptian Revolution. The Times had penned his visit with the words, "He, Erdogan Is Greeted like a Rock Star in Egypt".

=== Iraq ===
On 15 October 2009, Prime Minister Recep Tayyip Erdoğan visited the capital of Iraq. During this visit Iraq and Turkey signed 48 trade agreements by the Iraqi-Turkish Strategic Council in Baghdad. Agreements signed included sectors of security, energy, oil, electricity, water, health, trade, environment, transport, housing, construction, agriculture, education, higher education, and defense. On 23 March 2009, Abdullah Gül became the first Turkish head of state to visit Iraq in 33 years.

The Turkish government also warmed up relations with Iraqi Kurdistan by opening a Turkish university in Arbil, and a Turkish consulate in Mosul. While Turkey's policy against Iraq since the 2003 war had focused on preventing the rise of an autonomous or independent Kurdish political entity and eliminating the presence of the Kurdish Workers’Party in Northern Iraq, its policy under the influence of Davutoğlu's doctrine moved from containment to engagement. Turkey accepted the legitimacy of the Kurdistan Regional Government (KRG) as a federal entity within Iraq and deepened economic and political cooperation with the Baghdad federal government. Davutoğlu became the Turkish high-level official to visit Northern Iraq in October 2009. He met Turkey's erstwhile archenemy and President of the KRG Massoud Barzani and Prime Minister Nechervan Idris Barzani and announced the opening of a Turkish consulate in Arbil. In his statements, Davutoğlu argued that such a visit should have taken place long ago. Stating that he found Erbil very developed, Davutoğlu added, "All of us will contribute to the even further development of Erbil. This will become a bridge between Iraq and Turkey. We are the gate of Iraq to the European Union. And Arbil is our gate opening to Basra."

On 30 March 2011, Recep Tayyip Erdogan became the first Turkish prime minister to visit the Kurdish region of Iraq. The trip, in which he opened a new Turkish-built airport, is rich in significance given Turkey's own history of conflict with Kurdish rebels. His host, Iraqi Kurdish regional President Masoud Barzani, praised Erdogan's decision to come as "brave." "We believe your visit will build very strong bridges between Turkey and our country and our region," he said, welcoming Erdogan to Arbil. Erdoğan also visited Imam-ı Azam Ebu Hanife's tomb and Shiite Imams tombs in Kazimiya district of Baghdad. He then moved on from Baghdad to Najaf where he visited the shrine of Imam Ali. Erdoğan then met with the religious leader Ali al-Sistani.

=== Iran ===
Relations with Iran also improved significantly. Energy cooperation moved beyond the purchase and transit of Iranian natural gas through Turkey to the development of Iranian hydrocarbon fields by Turkish companies. Moreover, Turkey claimed a key mediating role in the Iranian nuclear dispute. Distancing itself from the United States and the European Union, Erdoğan made repeated statements on Western double standards regarding nuclear proliferation in the Middle East. Davutoğlu visited Tehran in February 2010 with the aim to broker a deal on the issue of uranium enrichment. Iran's nuclear ambitions were evidently an issue of utmost significance for Turkish national security, as well as an opportunity for Davutoğlu to put his proactive foreign policy vision into work.

=== Israel ===
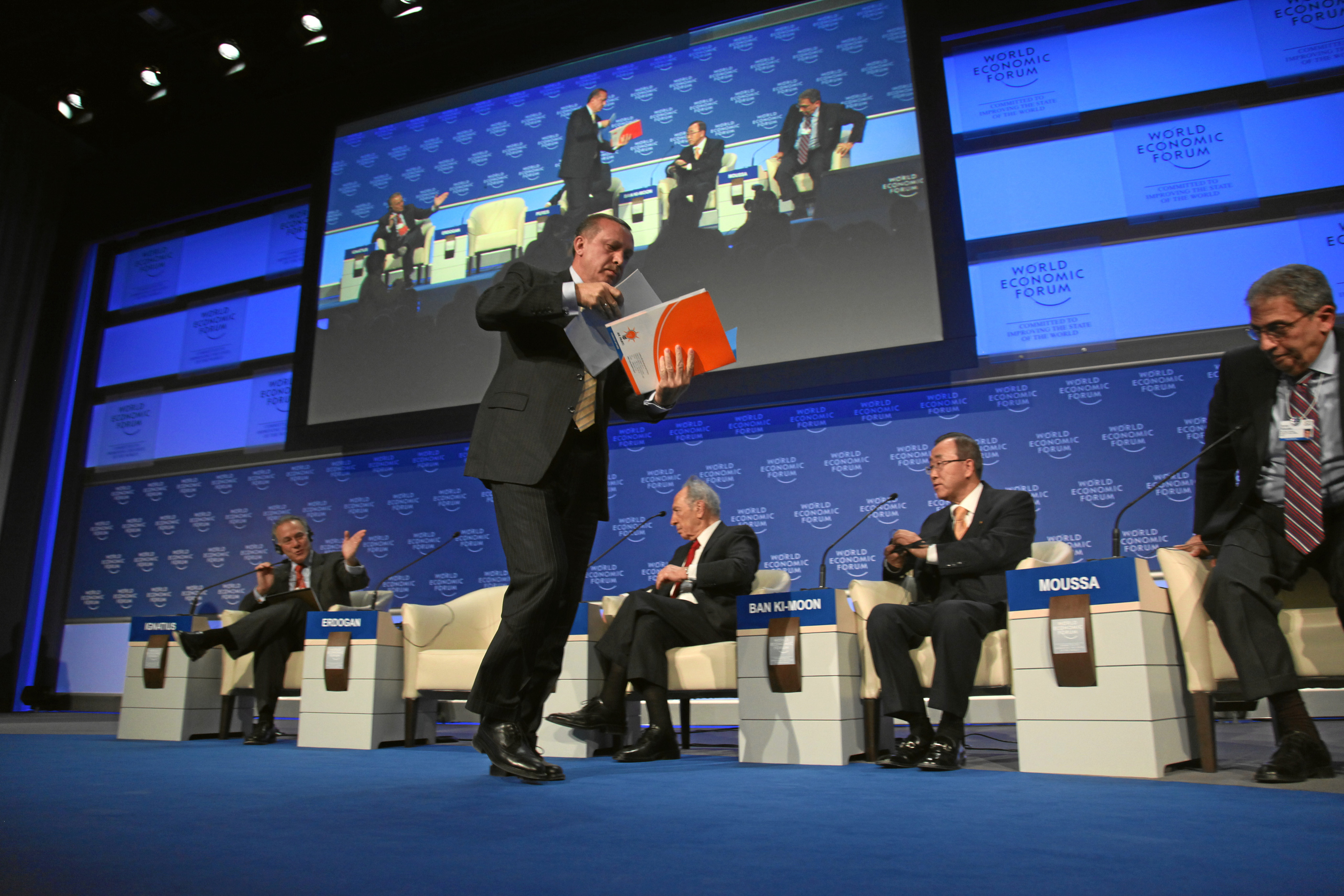
Erdoğan walks out of the session at the World Economic Forum in 2009, vows never to return.

Erdoğan is a supporter of a two-state solution for the Israeli-Palestinian conflict. He also called for Israel's nuclear facilities to come under IAEA inspection. Erdoğan accuses Israel of turning Gaza into an "open-air prison".

At the 2009 World Economic Forum conference, the debate became heated in relation to the Gaza conflict. The Israeli president Shimon Peres was heavily criticized by Erdogan (sitting beside him) over the handling of the conflict as response to Peres' strong language. Erdoğan also accused the moderator of giving Peres more time than all the other panelists combined.

Following the 2010 Gaza flotilla raid, tension between the two countries dramatically mounted, when Erdogan strongly condemned the raid, describing it as "state terrorism", calling for Israeli leaders responsible to be punished, and concluding his speech by saying that "we are sick of your [Israel's] lies".

=== Qatar ===
Current high level visits have given a new momentum to the bilateral relations between the two countries. Prime Minister Recep Tayyip Erdoğan, accompanied by the minister of energy and minister of finance, paid an official visit to Qatar between 13 and 15 April 2005. The prime minister also attended Doha VIII Democracy, Development and Free Trade Forum as a keynote speaker. During the visits, both sides agreed to improve the relations, especially in the economic and energy fields and strengthen their cooperation on the regional issues.

Prime Minister Sheikh Hamad bin Jabor bin Jassim Al Thani made a working visit to Turkey between 7 and 8 March 2007.

Turkey's president Abdullah Gül, accompanied by Minister of Finance, Minister of Energy, Minister of Public Work and Settlement, and a large group of businessmen, paid an official visit to Qatar between 5 and 7 February 2008, during which the 1st Turkish-Qatari Business Forum was also held.

Foreign Minister Ali Babacan visited Qatar to attend "The US-Islamic World Forum" as a keynote speaker organized by Qatari Ministry of Foreign Affairs and the US based Brookings Institution, as well as to have a bilateral meeting with his colleague Prime Minister and Foreign Minister Sheikh Hamad bin Jassem bin Jabor Al Thani.

=== Pakistan ===
Erodgan has made frequent visits to Pakistan. He has named Pakistan as his second home on numerous occasions. He has twice addressed the parliament of Pakistan.

=== Saudi Arabia ===
Diplomatic ties with Saudi Arabia were established in 1929. In recent years importance has been given to regional issues and to the improvement of bilateral relations to strengthen political, economic and military ties.

In August 2006, King Abdullah Bin Abdulaziz El Saud made a visit to Turkey. This was the first visit made by a Saudi monarch in forty years. Soon after that, he made a second visit to Turkey in the following year on 9 November 2007.

Turkish-Saudi trade volume has exceeded US$3.2 billion in 2006, almost double the figure achieved in 2003. In 2009, this amount reached US$5.5 billion and the goal for the year 2010 was US$10 billion. Trade is expected to increase even more, as the strategic locations of both countries translate into economies which are in a position to supplement each other.

=== Syria ===
During Erdoğan's term of office prior to the Syrian civil war, diplomatic relations between Turkey and Syria had significantly improved. While the two countries had come to the brink of war in late 1998, due to Syrian support for the Kurdistan Workers' Party, relations entered a blossom in 2004, when President Bashar al-Assad arrived in Turkey for the first official visit by a Syrian president in 57 years. In late 2004, Erdoğan signed a free trade agreement with Syria. The visa restrictions between the two countries have been lifted in 2009, which caused an economic boom in the regions near the Syrian border. Political and economic cooperation grew ever stronger, while Turkey repeatedly attempted to mediate between Syria and Israel with the aim to achieve a peace agreement and the return of the Golan Heights to Syria.

== United Nations ==
=== "The world is bigger than five" ===
"The world is bigger than five" (Turkish: Dünya beşten büyüktür) is a political doctrine conceived by Erdoğan. The "five" in the sentence refers to the five countries which are the permanent members of the United Nations Security Council (UNSC). These five countries' veto right was the doctrine's main objection. Erdoğan argued that these five countries had undermined the purpose of the United Nations and mentioned the UNSC's failure on creating solutions and making peace on Palestine, Syria and other places. Similar remarks have been made in the past. Erdoğan first expressed this doctrine in 2013, and then mentioned it in his speech at the seventy-fourth session of the United Nations General Assembly.

== See also ==
- List of prime ministerial trips made by Recep Tayyip Erdoğan
- Intermediate Region
- Ahmet Davutoğlu § Foreign policy ideals
- Binali Yıldırım § Foreign policy
