= List of international prime ministerial trips made by Recep Tayyip Erdoğan =

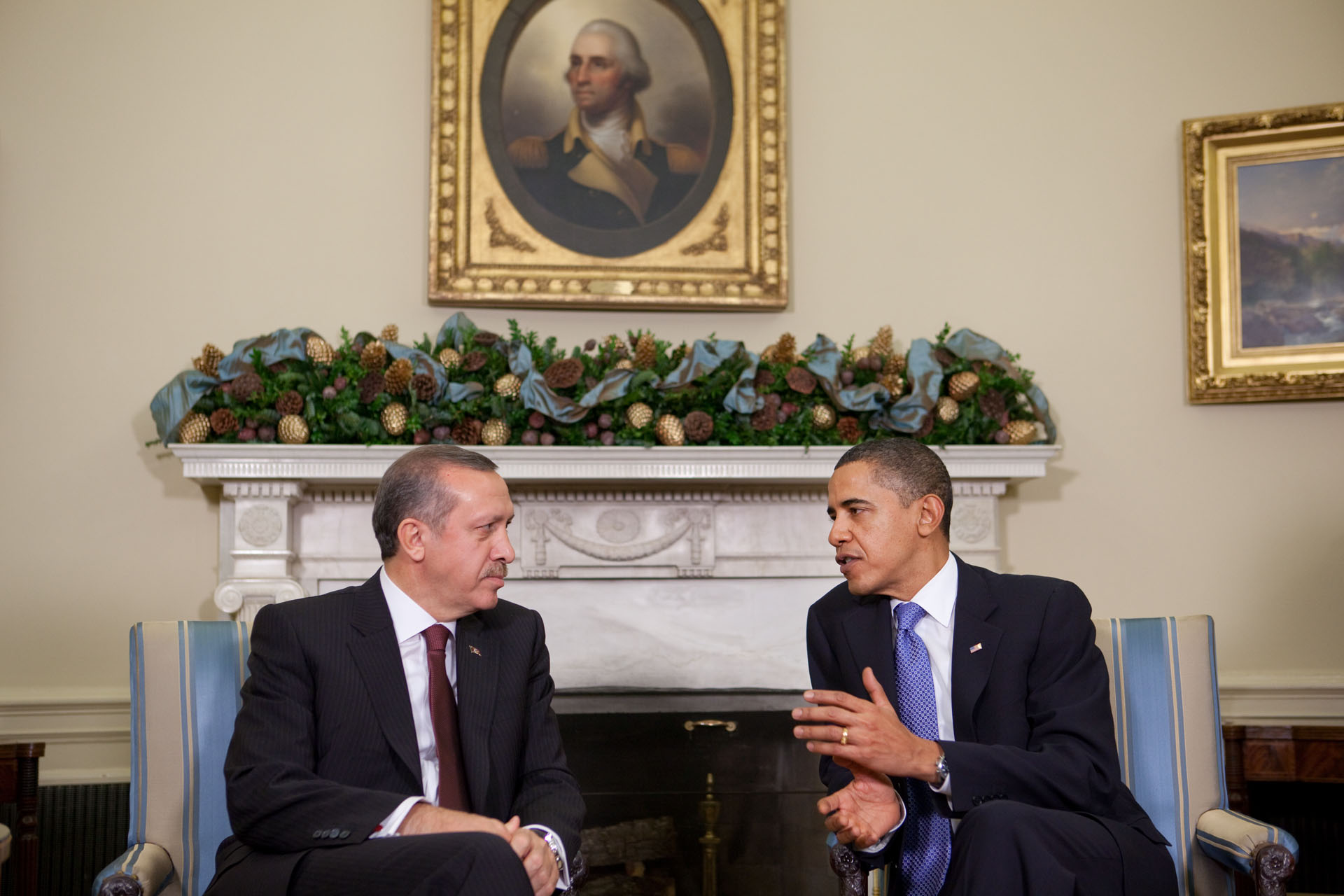
Prime Minister Recep Tayyip Erdogan meets with US President Barack Obama at the Oval Office, White House, December 7, 2009.

This is a list of international prime ministerial trips made by Recep Tayyip Erdoğan, the 25th Prime Minister of Turkey, after he assumed the premiership on March 14, 2003 and until he became the 12th President of Turkey on August 28, 2014. The summary does not include trips made after becoming the President.

Erdogan has made 326 international trips to 91 countries during the course of his premiership. He has made the largest number of trips to Germany. The second most visited country is the United States due to attendance of meetings of the United Nations and other international organizations. The third most visited country is Belgium, due to issues concerning the accession of Turkey to the European Union. The fourth most visited country by Erdoğan is the neighbouring Azerbaijan.

== Summary of international trips ==
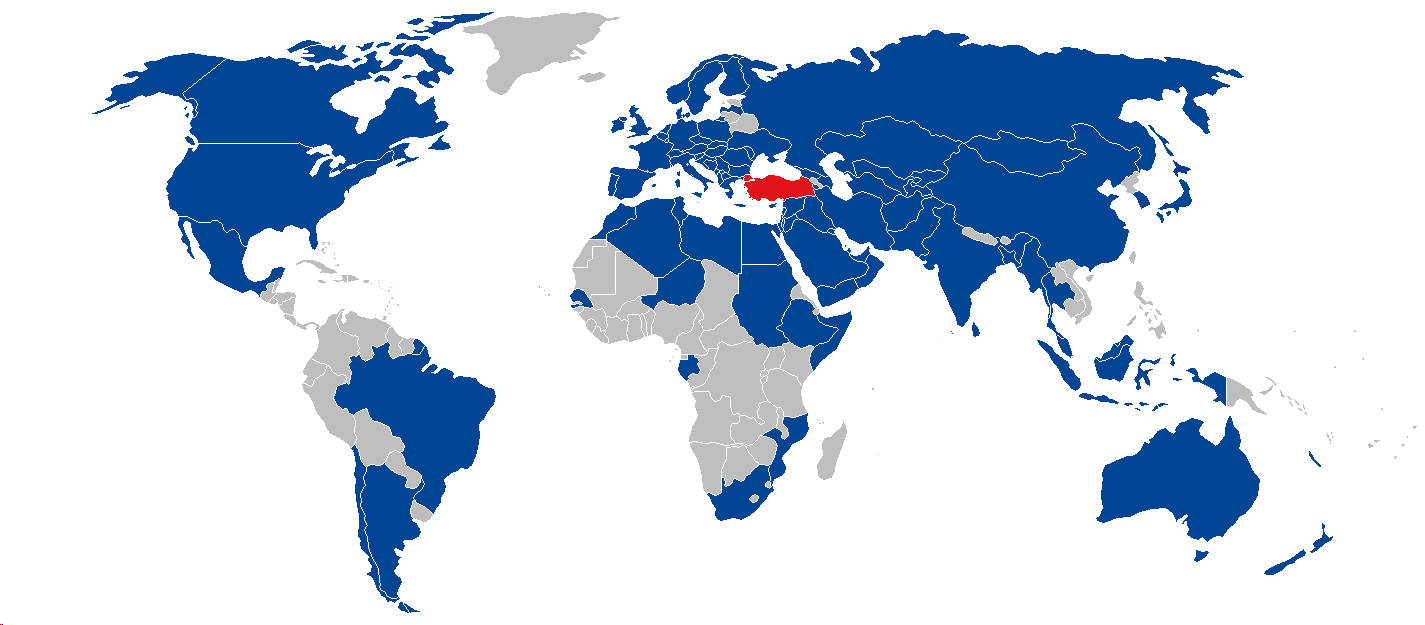
Map of international trips made by Recep Tayyip Erdoğan as prime minister: Visited countries Turkey

Number of visits	Country
1 visit	Afghanistan, Argentina, Australia, Bahrain, Bangladesh, Brunei, Canada, Chile, Croatia, Gabon, India, Israel, Latvia, Maldives, Moldova, Monaco, New Zealand, Niger, Norway, Oman, Senegal, Singapore, Slovakia, Slovenia, Somalia, Sri Lanka, Sudan, Thailand, Uzbekistan, Vatican City, Yemen. (31 Countries)
2 visits	Algeria, Austria, Brazil, China, Czech Republic, Ethiopia, Hungary, Ireland, Japan, Jordan, Kosovo, Kuwait, Libya, Luxembourg, Mexico, Mongolia, Morocco, Republic of Macedonia, Romania, Serbia, South Africa, Tajikistan. (22 Countries)
3 visits	Bulgaria, Finland, Indonesia, Kazakhstan, Kyrgyzstan, Netherlands, Poland, Portugal, South Korea, Sweden, Tunisia, Ukraine, United Arab Emirates. (13 Countries)
4 visits	Iraq, Lebanon, Malaysia. (3 Countries)
5 visits	Denmark, Egypt, Iran, Turkmenistan. (4 Countries)
6 visits	Bosnia and Herzegovina, Georgia. (2 Countries)
7 visits	Greece, Northern Cyprus, Pakistan, Qatar, Spain, Switzerland. (6 Countries)
9 visits	Italy. (1 Country)
10 visits	Syria, United Kingdom. (2 Countries)
12 visits	France, Saudi Arabia. (2 Countries)
13 visits	Azerbaijan, Russia. (2 Countries)
14 visits	Belgium. (1 Country)
16 visits	United States. (1 Country)
17 visits	Germany. (1 Country)

Total: 326 international trips to 91 countries.

== 2002 ==
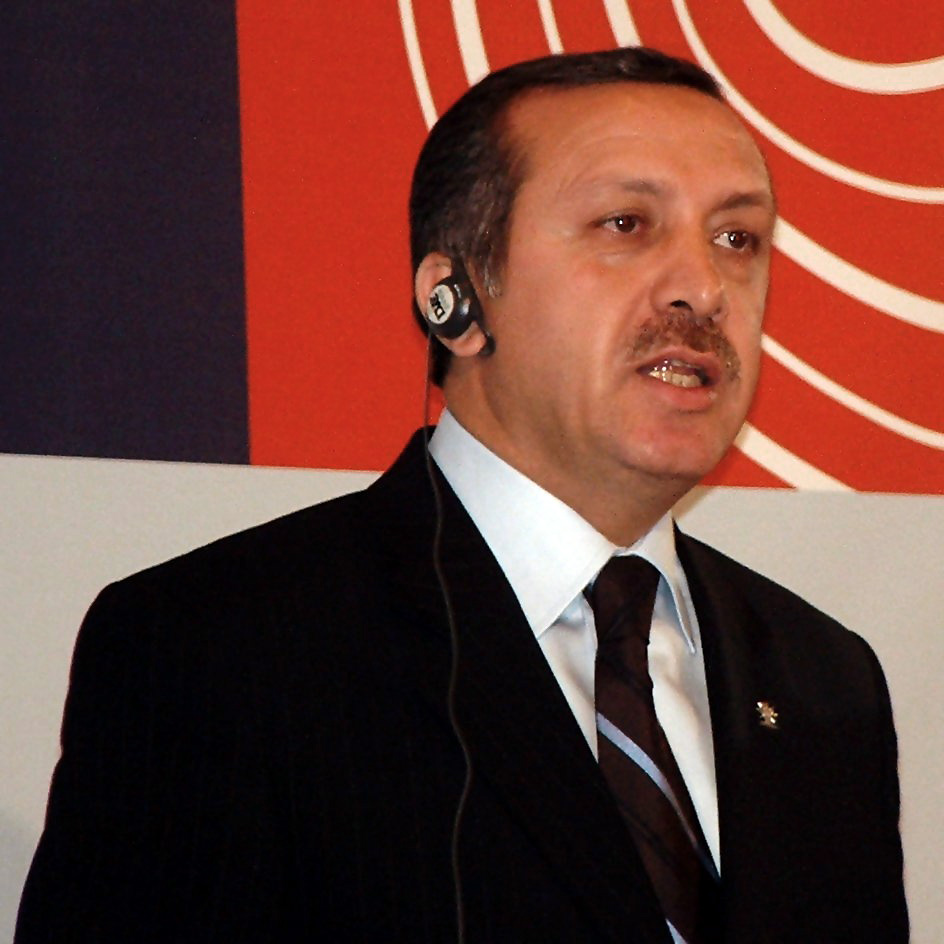
Erdoğan during a visit in Denmark, November 26, 2002

Erdogan won the elections of November 2002, but was obstructed to become prime minister until the by-election in March 2003. Although, Erdogan was not the Prime Minister during that period, he still served as the de facto leader of Turkey. During this period, his visits were done in the framework of accession of Turkey to the European Union

Country	Areas visited	Date(s)
Italy	Rome	November 13, 2002
Northern Cyprus	Nicosia	November 16, 2002
Spain	Madrid	November 18, 2002
Greece	Athens	November 18–19, 2002
Germany	Berlin	November 19, 2002
Belgium	Brussels	November 20, 2002
United Kingdom	London	November 20, 2002
Ireland	Dublin	November 21, 2002
France	Strasbourg	November 21, 2002
Portugal	Lisbon	November 25, 2002
Denmark	Copenhagen	November 26, 2002
Finland	Helsinki	November 26, 2002
Sweden	Stockholm	November 27, 2002
France	Paris	November 27, 2002
Netherlands	The Hague	November 29, 2002
Luxembourg	Luxembourg	November 29, 2002
Denmark	Copenhagen	December 9–10, 2002
United States	New York, Washington, D.C.	December 10–11, 2002
Denmark	Copenhagen	December 12–13, 2002
Russia	Moscow	December 23–24, 2002
Azerbaijan	Baku	January 7–8, 2003
Turkmenistan	Ashgabat, Mary	January 8–10, 2003
Kazakhstan	Astana	January 10–11, 2003
China	Beijing, Shanghai	January 14–17, 2003
Switzerland	Zurich	January 23–26, 2003

== 2003 ==
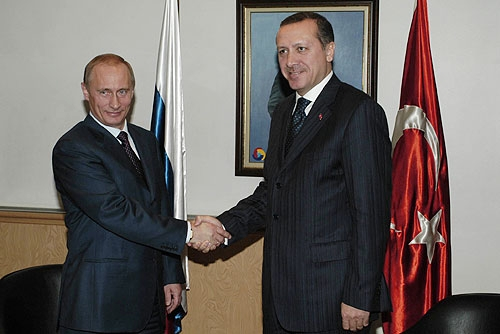
Erdogan meeting with Russian President Vladimir Putin

As Prime Minister:

Country	Areas visited	Date(s)
Serbia and Montenegro	Belgrade	April 8–9
Northern Cyprus	Kyrenia, Nicosia	May 9
Malaysia	Kuala Lumpur	June 13–15
Pakistan	Islamabad	June 15–17
Greece	Thessaloniki	June 20
Portugal	Lisbon	July 1–2
Austria	Vienna	July 11–12
France	Paris	August 31 - 1
Germany	Berlin	September 1–3
Italy	Como	September 6–7
Italy	Rome	October 3–4
Belgium	Brussels	October 16–17
Kyrgyzstan	Bishkek	October 21–22
Tajikistan	Dushanbe	October 23–24
Northern Cyprus	Nicosia	November 15
Belgium	Brussels	December 11–13
Azerbaijan	Baku	December 15
Uzbekistan	Tashkent, Samarkand	December 18–20

== 2004 ==
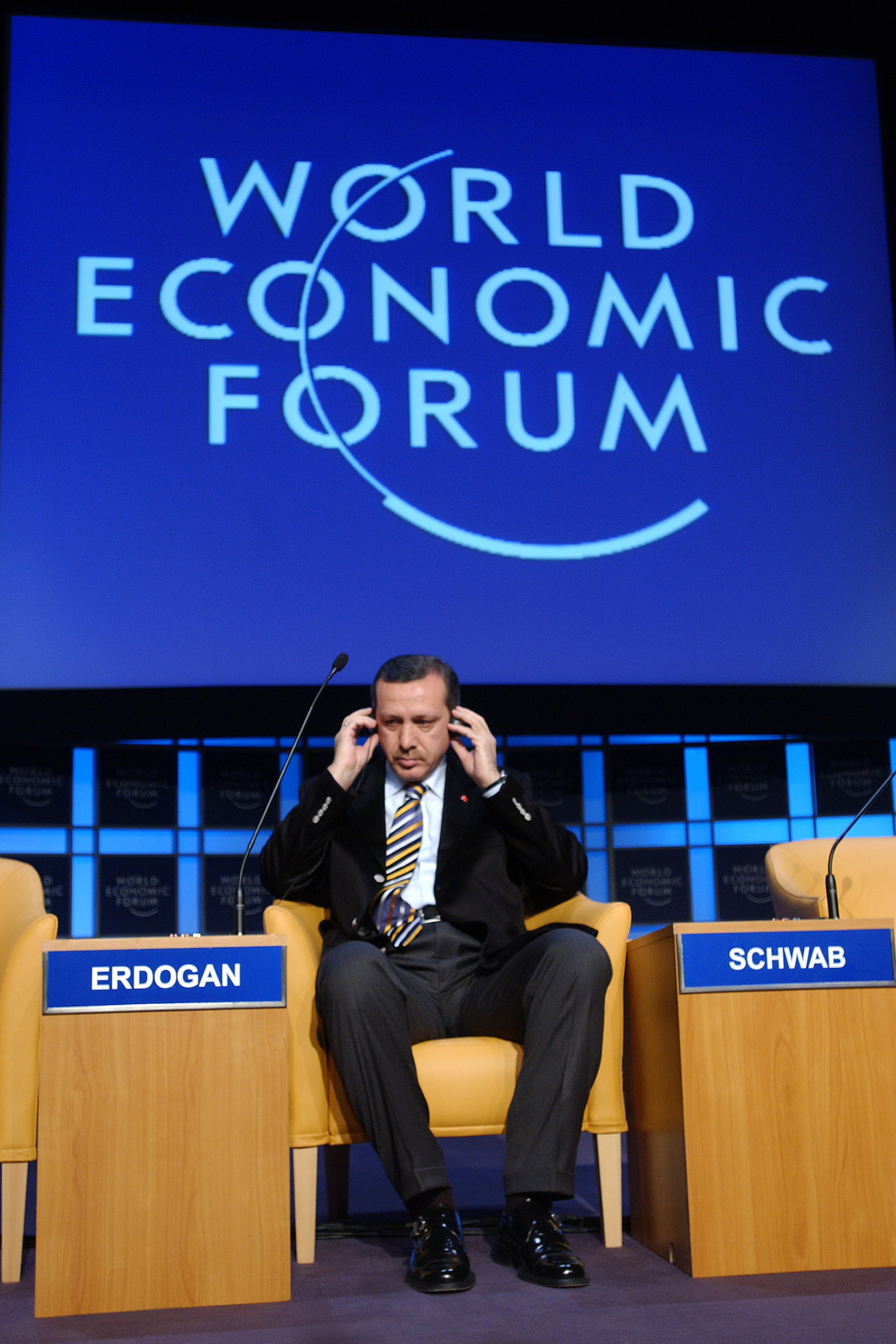
Erdogan at the Annual Meeting 2004 of the World Economic Forum in Davos, Switzerland, January 24, 2004.

Country	Areas visited	Date(s)
Germany	Berlin	January 9
Saudi Arabia	Jeddah	January 17–19
Switzerland	Davos	January 24–25
United States	Boston, New York City, Washington, D.C.	January 26–31
Belgium	Brussels	February 1
South Korea	Busan, Seoul, Ulsan	February 8–11
Belgium	Brussels	March 25–26
Switzerland	Bürgenstock, Zurich	March 29-1
Ukraine	Kyiv, Simferopol	April 2–3
Japan	Osaka, Tokyo	April 11–15
Afghanistan	Kabul	April 20–21
Bosnia and Herzegovina	Sarajevo, Zenica	April 21–22
Germany	Cologne	April 27
Ireland	Dublin	May 1
Greece	Athens, Komotini	May 6–8
Romania	Bucharest	May 20–21
United Kingdom	London	May 28–29
United States	Boston, Chicago, Savannah	June 9–13
Netherlands	The Hague	June 16–17
Belgium	Brussels	June 17–18
Bulgaria	Sofia, Targovishte, Varna	July 6–7
France	Paris	July 19–21
Iran	Tehran	July 28–30
Georgia	Tbilisi	August 11–12
Greece	Athens	August 13–14
Tajikistan	Dushanbe	September 13–14
Belgium	Brussels	September 23
Germany	Berlin	October 3
France	Paris	October 20–21
Germany	Berlin	October 26–27
Italy	Rome	October 28–29
France	Strasbourg	November 5–6
Egypt	Cairo	November 12
Luxembourg	Luxembourg	November 16–17
Belgium	Brussels	December 9–10
Belgium	Brussels	December 15–17
Syria	Aleppo, Damascus	December 22–23

== 2005 ==
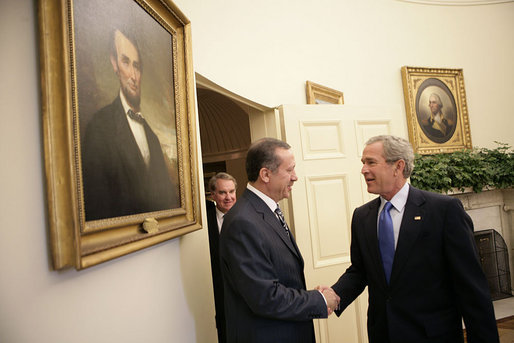
Erdogan with U.S. President George W. Bush in the Oval Office, 2005

Country	Areas visited	Date(s)
Russia	Moscow	January 10–12
Switzerland	Davos	January 27–30
Indonesia	Aceh, Jakarta	February 6–7
Malaysia	Kuala Lumpur	February 7
Thailand	Bangkok, Phuket	February 8
Maldives	Malé	February 9
Sri Lanka	Matara	February 10
Bosnia and Herzegovina	Sarajevo	February 15–17
Belgium	Brussels	February 22
Ethiopia	Addis Ababa	March 2–3
South Africa	Cape Town, Pretoria	March 3–5
Spain	Madrid	March 11
Belgium	Brussels	March 21–22
Tunisia	Tunis	March 28–29
Morocco	Casablanca, Rabat	March 30–31
Vatican City		April 8
Norway	Oslo, Stavanger	April 11–12
Israel	Jerusalem, Tel Aviv	May 1
Russia	Moscow	May 9
Hungary	Budapest, Szigetvár	May 12–13
Poland	Warsaw	May 16–17
Kazakhstan	Almaty, Astana	May 26–27
United States	New York City, Washington, D.C.	June 7–11
Lebanon	Beirut	June 15–16
Azerbaijan	Baku	June 29–30
United States	San Francisco, Sun Valley	July 6
Russia	Moscow, Sochi	July 17–18
Mongolia	Karakorum, Ulaanbaatar	July 18–21
United Kingdom	London	July 27–28
Italy	Como, Napoli, Rome	September 2–3
United States	New York City	September 13–16
Saudi Arabia	Jeddah	September 18–19
Oman	Muscat	September 27
UAE	Abu Dhabi	September 28
Pakistan	Islamabad, Kashmir, Muzaffarabad	October 20–21
Kuwait	Kuwait City	October 25
Yemen	Sana'a	October 26
Germany	Cologne	November 6
Bahrain	Manama	November 13
Denmark	Copenhagen	November 15
United Kingdom	London	November 26–27
Spain	Barcelona, Madrid, Mallorca	November 27–28
New Zealand	Auckland, Christchurch, Wellington	December 3–6
Australia	Canberra, Melbourne, Sydney	December 6–10

== 2006 ==
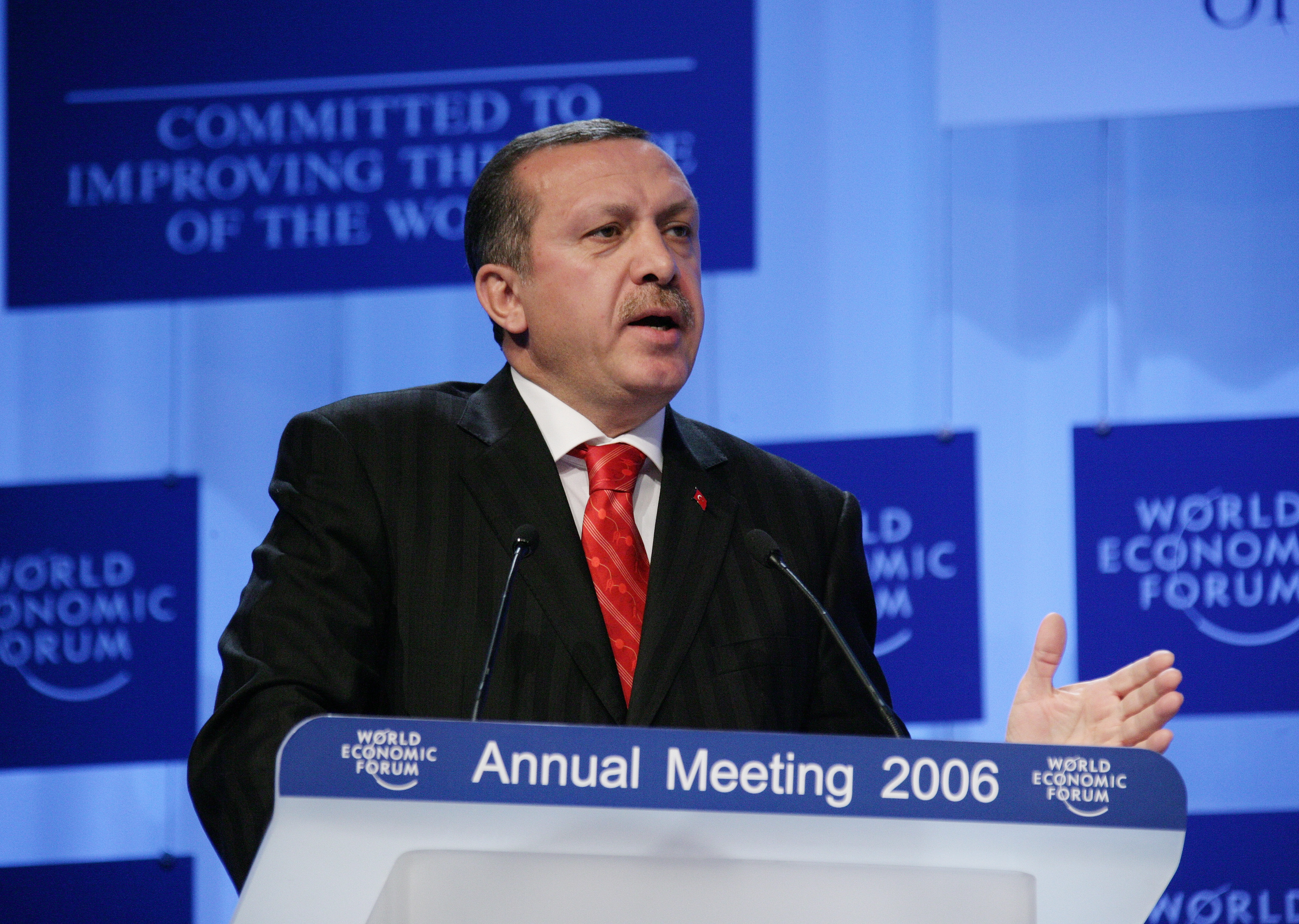
Erdogan at the Annual Meeting 2006 of the World Economic Forum in Davos, Switzerland, January 27, 2006.

Country	Areas visited	Date(s)
Switzerland	Davos	January 26–27
Monaco	Monaco	March 1–2
Sudan	Darfur, Khartoum	March 27–29
Saudi Arabia	Jeddah	March 29–30
Greece	Thessaloniki	May 4
Azerbaijan	Baku	May 4–5
Indonesia	Bali	May 13–14
Egypt	Sharm el-Sheikh	May 20–21
Algeria	Algiers	May 22–23
Germany	Berlin	May 25–26
Croatia	Zagreb	June 12–13
Republic of Macedonia	Skopje	June 13–14
France	Strasbourg	June 27–28
Northern Cyprus	Boğazköy, Nicosia	July 19–21
Malaysia	Kuala Lumpur	August 3
United States	New York City, Washington, D.C.	September 30-2
Saudi Arabia	Jeddah	October 8
United Kingdom	London	November 3
Jordan	Amman, Petra	November 25–26
Latvia	Riga	November 28–29
Iran	Tehran	December 2–3
Syria	Damascus	December 6
United States	New York City	December 18–20
Turkmenistan	Ashgabat	December 24–29

== 2007 ==
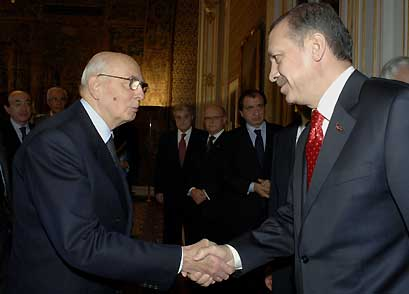
Erdogan meeting the Italian President Giorgio Napolitano in Rome, November 7, 2007

Country	Areas visited	Date(s)
Lebanon	Beirut, Tyre	January 3
Ethiopia	Addis Ababa	January 28–30
Georgia	Tbilisi	February 7
Turkmenistan	Ashgabat	February 13–14
Saudi Arabia	Jeddah, Riyadh	February 24–26
Azerbaijan	Baku	March 9–10
Saudi Arabia	Riyadh	March 28–29
Syria	Aleppo	April 3–4
Germany	Hanover	April 15–16
United States	New York City, Washington, D.C.	September 21–29
Romania	Bucharest	October 25–26
United States	Washington, D.C.	November 4–6
Italy	Rome	November 7–8
Czech Republic	Pardubice, Prague	November 15–16
Azerbaijan	Baku	November 16–17
United Kingdom	London, Oxford	November 22–23
Portugal	Lisbon	December 8

== 2008 ==
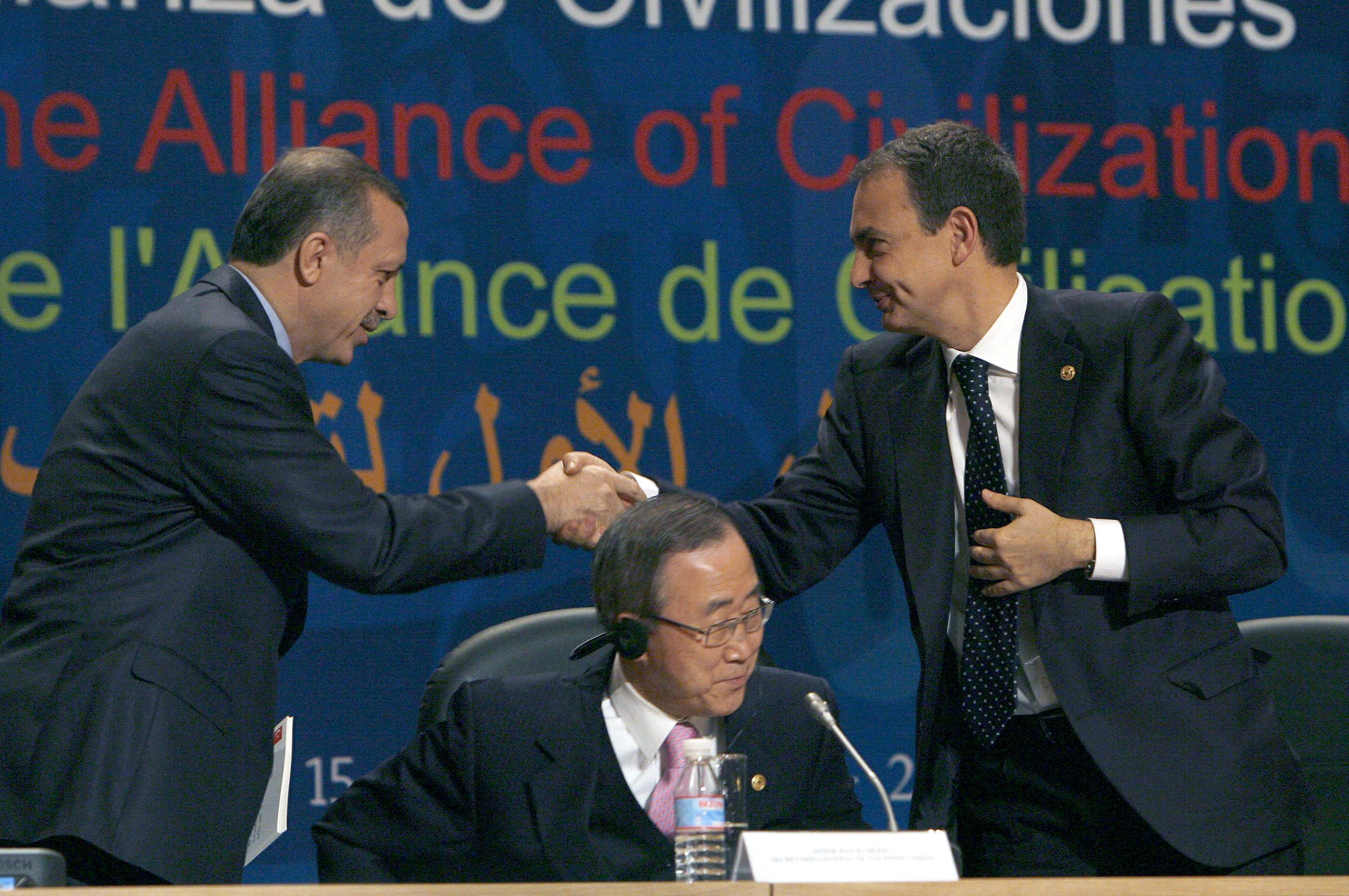
Erdoğan (Left) with Secretary-General of the United Nations Ban Ki-moon (Center), and Spanish Prime Minister José Luis Rodríguez Zapatero (Right) in Spain, January 15, 2008

Country	Areas visited	Date(s)
Spain	Granada, Madrid	January 13–16
Germany	Berlin, Cologne, Ludwigshafen, Munich	February 7–10
Bosnia and Herzegovina	Ilidža, Sarajevo	March 25–26
Bulgaria	Kardzhali, Sofia, Targovishte	March 27–28
Sweden	Stockholm	April 2–3
Qatar	Doha	April 13–15
Syria	Damascus	April 26
Lebanon	Beirut	May 25–26
Azerbaijan	Nakhchivan	June 3–4
Iraq	Baghdad	July 10
France	Paris	July 13
Northern Cyprus	Nicosia	July 18–20
Russia	Moscow	August 13
Georgia	Tbilisi	August 14
Azerbaijan	Baku	August 20
Syria	Damascus	September 4
Turkmenistan	Ashgabat	October 3–4
United States	New York City, Washington, D.C.	November 13–15
Switzerland	Geneva	November 17–18
India	New Delhi, Bangalore	November 20–24
Syria	Damascus	December 31
Jordan	Aqaba	December 31

== 2009 ==
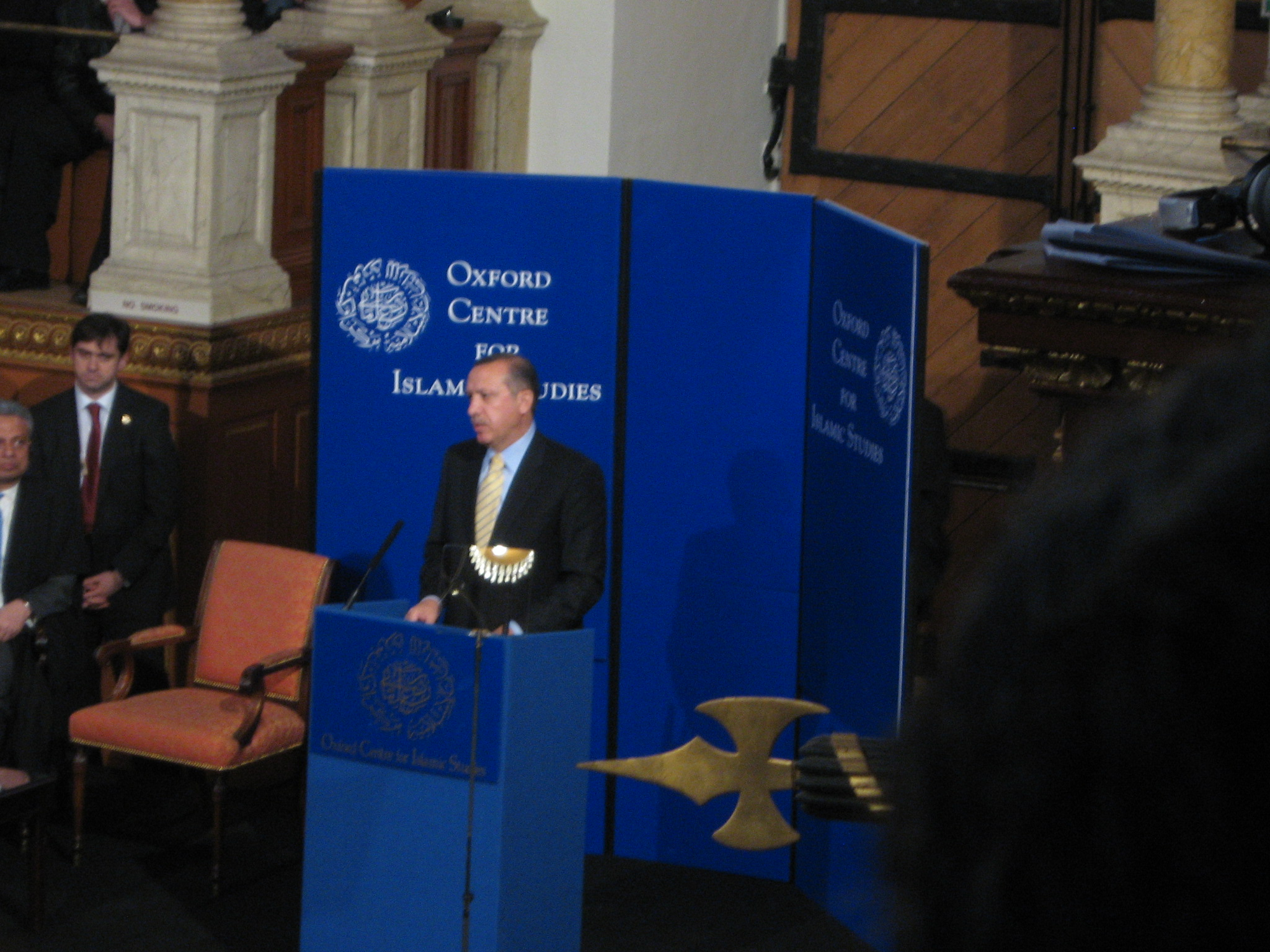
Erdoğan speaking at the University of Oxford, April 3, 2009

Country	Areas visited	Date(s)
Egypt	Sharm el-Sheikh	January 1
Saudi Arabia	Riyadh	January 3
Belgium	Brussels	January 18–19
Switzerland	Davos	January 28–29
Georgia	Batumi	March 5
United Kingdom	London	April 1–3
Germany	Berlin	April 18–19
Azerbaijan	Baku	May 12–13
Poland	Warsaw	May 13–15
Russia	Sochi	May 16
Belgium	Brussels	June 25–27
Moldova	Chişinău	July 4–5
Italy	L'Aquila	July 9–10
Syria	Aleppo	July 22
United States	New York City, Pittsburgh, Washington, D.C.	September 21–27
Iraq	Baghdad	October 15
Pakistan	Islamabad	October 24–26
Iraq	Baghdad	October 26–28
Qatar	Doha	November 12–13
Italy	Rome	November 17–18
United States	Washington, D.C.	December 7–9
Mexico	Mexico City	December 9–10
Russia	Moscow	December 11–13
Syria	Damascus	December 22

== 2010 ==
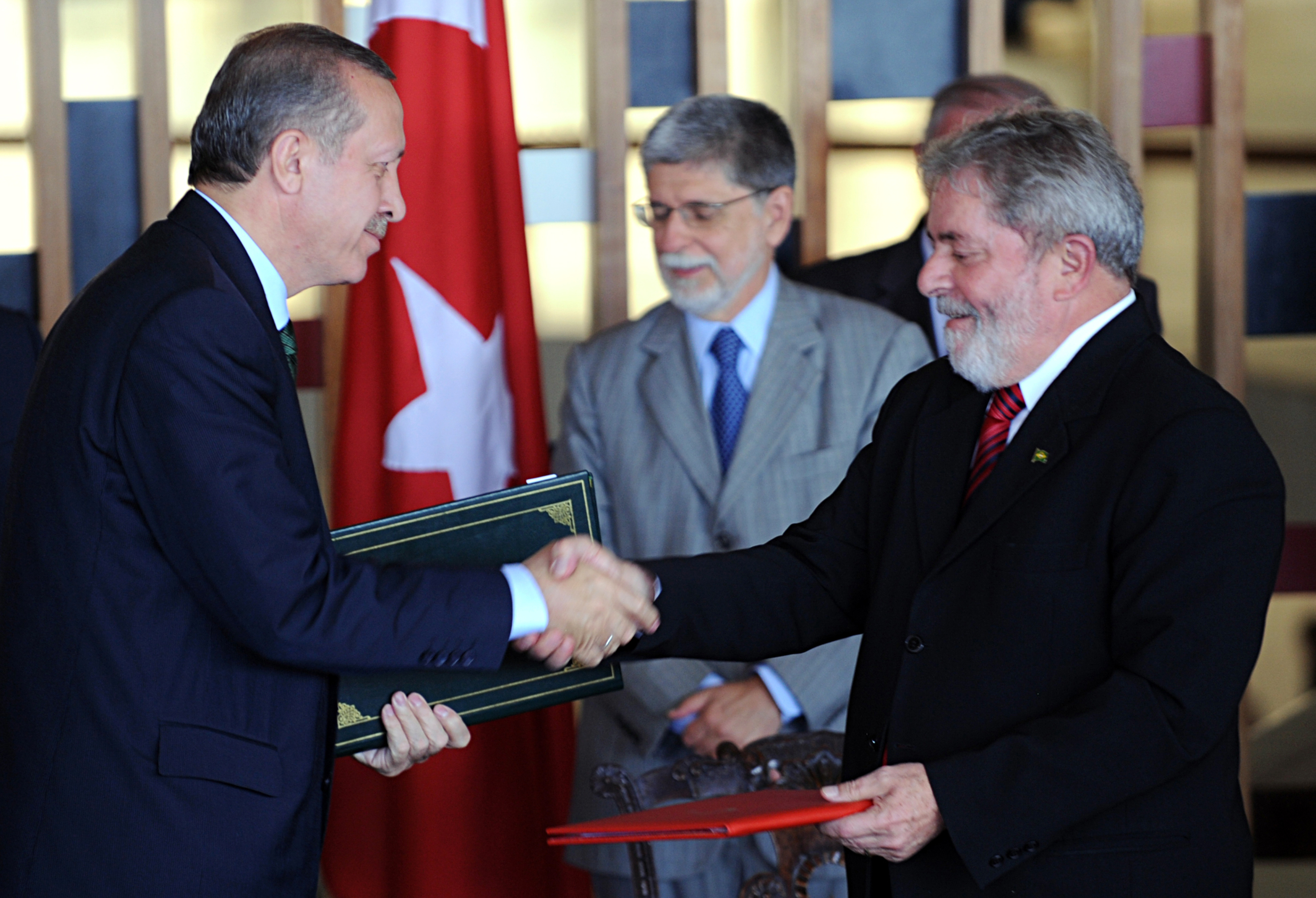
Brazilian President Luiz Inácio Lula da Silva and Turkish Prime Minister Recep Tayyip Erdogan in Brazil, May 27, 2010

Country	Areas visited	Date(s)
Russia	Moscow	January 12–13
UAE	Abu Dhabi	January 17–18
Saudi Arabia	Riyadh	January 18–19
Qatar	Doha	February 13–14
Spain	Cordoba, Madrid	February 22–23
Saudi Arabia	Riyadh	March 9
United Kingdom	London	March 16
Bosnia and Herzegovina	Sarajevo	April 5–6
France	Paris	April 6–8
United States	Washington, D.C.	April 12–14
Greece	Athens	May 14–15
Iran	Tehran	May 17
Azerbaijan	Baku	May 17
Georgia	Batumi	May 17
Spain	Madrid	May 18
Brazil	Brasília, Rio de Janeiro, São Paulo	May 26–29
Chile	Santiago	May 30
Canada	Toronto	June 27–28
Bosnia and Herzegovina	Srebrenica	July 10–11
Serbia	Belgrade, Novi Pazar	July 11–12
Bulgaria	Sofia	October 4
Germany	Berlin	October 8–9
Syria	Damascus	October 11
Pakistan	Islamabad, Karachi, Muzaffarabad	October 12–13
Finland	Helsinki	October 19–20
Greece	Athens	October 21–22
Kosovo	Mamusha, Pristina, Prizren	November 3–4
South Korea	Seoul	November 11–13
Bangladesh	Dhaka	November 13–14
Lebanon	Akkar District, Beirut, Sidon	November 24–25
Libya	Tripoli	November 28–29

== 2011 ==
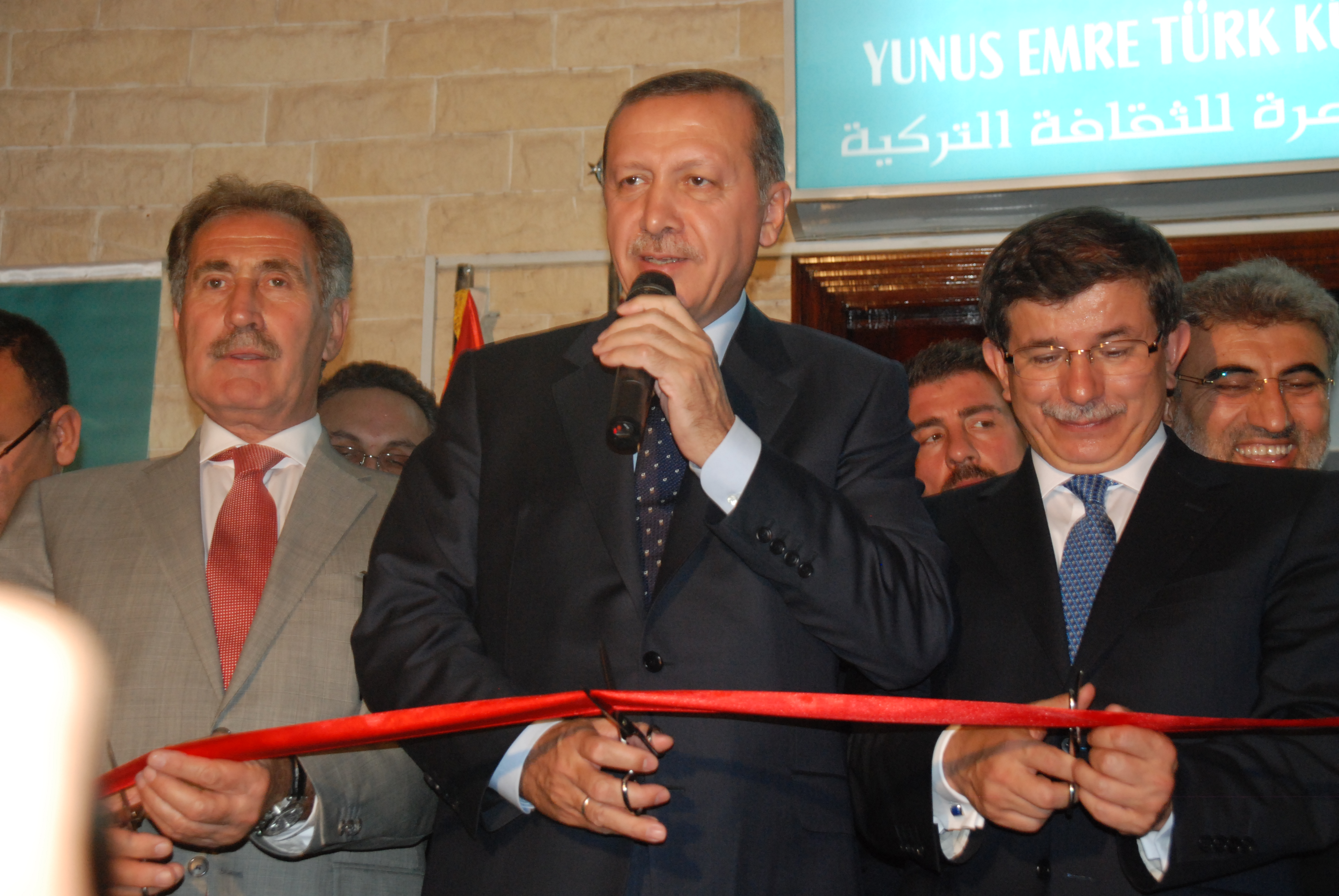
Erdoğan (center) at an opening ceremony in Cairo with Ertuğrul Günay (left) and Ahmet Davutoğlu (right) as part of the Arab Spring tour, September 12, 2011

Country	Areas visited	Date(s)
Kuwait	Kuwait City	January 10–11
Qatar	Doha	January 12–13
Syria	Damascus	January 17
Ukraine	Kyiv	January 24–25
Kyrgyzstan	Bishkek	February 1–2
Germany	Berlin, Düsseldorf, Hanover	February 28
Russia	Kazan, Moscow	March 15–17
Saudi Arabia	Jeddah, Medina	March 19–21
Iraq	Arbil, Baghdad, Najaf	March 28–29
United Kingdom	London	March 30–31
France	Strasbourg	April 12–13
Georgia	Batumi	May 31
Northern Cyprus	Nicosia	July 19–21
Azerbaijan	Baku	July 27
Somalia	Mogadishu	August 19
Egypt	Cairo	September 12–14
Tunisia	Tunis	September 15–16
Libya	Benghazi, Misrata, Tripoli	September 16
United States	New York City	September 19–25
Republic of Macedonia	Skopje, Tetovo, Ohrid, Gostivar	September 29–30
South Africa	Pretoria	October 4–5
Saudi Arabia	Riyadh	October 26
Germany	Berlin	November 1–2
France	Cannes	November 3–4

== 2012 ==
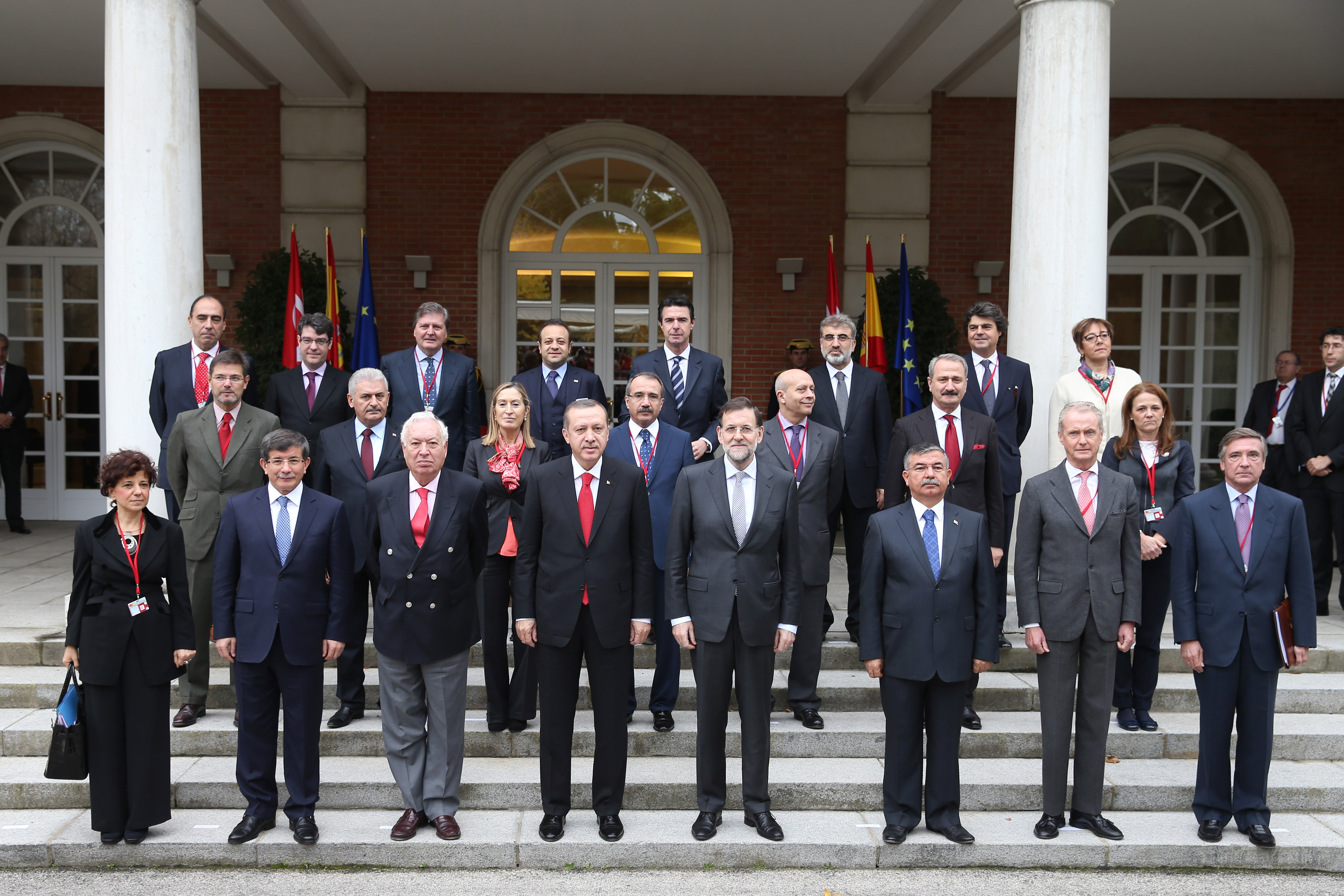
Cabinets of Spain and Turkey in Madrid, November 27, 2012

Country	Areas visited	Date(s)
Northern Cyprus	Nicosia	January 17
South Korea	Seoul	March 24–27
Iran	Tehran	March 27–28
China	Beijing, Shanghai, Ürümqi	April 8–11
Saudi Arabia	Riyadh	April 13
Qatar	Doha	April 20–21
Slovenia	Ljubljana, Bled	May 7
Italy	Rome	May 8
Pakistan	Islamabad	May 20–22
Kazakhstan	Astana	May 23–24
Mexico	Los Cabos	June 17–19
Brazil	Rio de Janeiro	June 20–22
Russia	Moscow	July 18–19
United Kingdom	London	July 26–27
Azerbaijan	Baku, Shaki	September 11–12
Ukraine	Kyiv, Yalta, Sevastopol	September 13–14
Bosnia and Herzegovina	Sarajevo	September 14–15
Germany	Berlin	October 30–31
Indonesia	Bali	November 6–9
Brunei	Bandar Seri Begawan	November 10
Egypt	Cairo	November 17–18
Pakistan	Islamabad	November 21–22
Spain	Madrid	November 27–28

== 2013 ==
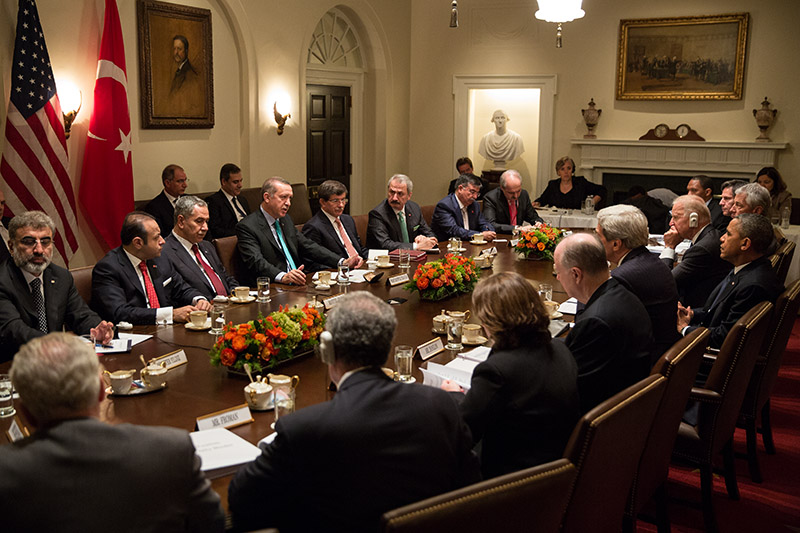
Erdoğan and Obama during bilateral meeting in the Cabinet Room of the White House, May 16, 2013

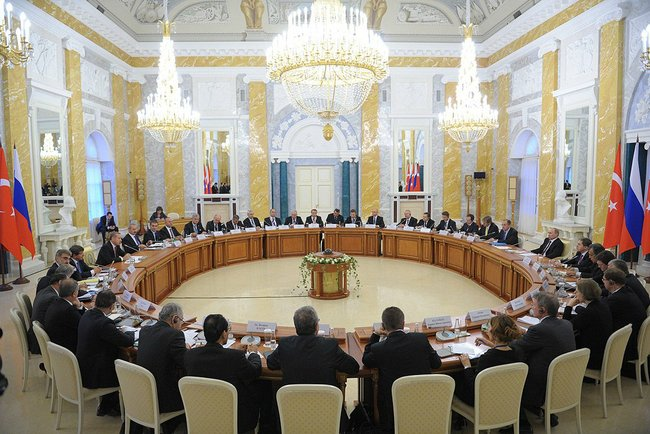
High-Level Russian-Turkish Cooperation Council in St.Petersburg, November 22, 2013

Country	Areas visited	Date(s)
Gabon	Libreville	January 6–7
Niger	Niamey	January 8–9
Senegal	Dakar	January 10–11
Qatar	Doha	January 29
Czech Republic	Prague	February 3–4
Hungary	Budapest	February 4–5
Slovakia	Bratislava	February 5–6
UAE	Sharjah	February 23–24
Denmark	Copenhagen	March 20–21
Netherlands	Amsterdam, The Hague	March 22
Kyrgyzstan	Bishkek	April 9–10
Mongolia	Ulaanbaatar	April 11–12
United States	Washington, D.C., San Francisco	May 15–20
Morocco	Rabat	June 3–4
Algeria	Algiers	June 4–5
Tunisia	Tunis	June 5–6
Turkmenistan	Awaza	August 15–16
Russia	Saint Petersburg	September 5–6
Argentina	Buenos Aires	September 7–8
Kosovo	Pristina	October 23
Finland	Helsinki	November 5–6
Sweden	Stockholm	November 6
Poland	Warsaw	November 7
Russia	Saint Petersburg	November 22
Qatar	Doha	December 4
Pakistan	Lahore, Islamabad	December 23–24

== 2014 ==
Country	Areas visited	Date(s)
Japan	Tokyo	January 6–8
Singapore	Singapore	January 8–9
Malaysia	Kuala Lumpur	January 10–11
Belgium	Brussels	January 20–21
Iran	Tehran	January 29–30
Germany	Berlin	February 4–5
Russia	Sochi	February 7
Azerbaijan	Baku	April 4
Germany	Cologne	May 25
Austria	Vienna	June 19
France	Lyon, Paris	June 20–21

== See also ==
- List of international presidential trips made by Recep Tayyip Erdoğan
- Foreign policy of the Recep Tayyip Erdoğan government
