= Erdoğan Cabinet =

Erdoğan Cabinet is the name of any of four cabinets of the Republic of Turkey:

- Cabinet Erdoğan I (2003–2007)
- Cabinet Erdoğan II (2007–2011)
- Cabinet Erdoğan III (2011–2014)
- Cabinet Erdoğan IV (2018–2023)
- Cabinet Erdoğan V (since 2023)
