= List of diplomatic missions of Turkey =

This is a list of embassies and consulates of Turkey in countries around the world, representing Turkish interests and providing consular services to Turkish citizens abroad. These diplomatic missions serve as a vital link between Turkey and the international community, promoting trade, cultural exchange, and diplomatic relations. With 252 diplomatic and consular missions, Turkey has the 3rd largest diplomatic network in the world.

Turkey Embassy and Consulate(s) General Embassy Consulate General Trade Office

== Africa ==
Host country	Host city	Mission	Concurrent accreditation	Ref.
Algeria	Algiers	Embassy		
Algeria	Oran	Consulate–General		
Angola	Luanda	Embassy		
Benin	Cotonou	Embassy		
Botswana	Gaborone	Embassy		
Burkina Faso	Ouagadougou	Embassy		
Burundi	Bujumbura	Embassy		
Cameroon	Yaoundé	Embassy	Countries: Central African Republic	
Chad	N'Djamena	Embassy		
Congo-Brazzaville	Brazzaville	Embassy		
Congo-Kinshasa	Kinshasa	Embassy		
Djibouti	Djibouti	Embassy		
Egypt	Cairo	Embassy		
Egypt	Alexandria	Consulate–General		
Equatorial Guinea	Malabo	Embassy		
Eritrea	Asmara	Embassy		
Ethiopia	Addis Ababa	Embassy		
Gabon	Libreville	Embassy	Countries: São Tomé and Príncipe	
Gambia	Banjul	Embassy		
Ghana	Accra	Embassy	Countries: Liberia	
Guinea	Conakry	Embassy		
Guinea-Bissau	Bissau	Embassy		
Ivory Coast	Abidjan	Embassy		
Kenya	Nairobi	Embassy	Countries: Seychelles	
Libya	Tripoli	Embassy		
Libya	Benghazi	Consulate–General		
Libya	Misrata	Consulate–General		
Madagascar	Antananarivo	Embassy	Countries: Comoros; Mauritius	
Mali	Bamako	Embassy		
Mauritania	Nouakchott	Embassy		
Morocco	Rabat	Embassy		
Mozambique	Maputo	Embassy		
Namibia	Windhoek	Embassy		
Niger	Niamey	Embassy		
Nigeria	Abuja	Embassy		
Rwanda	Kigali	Embassy		
Senegal	Dakar	Embassy	Countries: Cape Verde	
Sierra Leone	Freetown	Embassy		
Somalia	Mogadishu	Embassy		
Somalia	Hargeisa	Consulate–General		
South Africa	Pretoria	Embassy	Countries: Eswatini; Lesotho	
South Africa	Cape Town	Consulate–General	Countries: Eswatini; Lesotho	
South Sudan	Juba	Embassy		
Sudan	Khartoum	Embassy		
Tanzania	Dar es Salaam	Embassy		
Togo	Lomé	Embassy		
Tunisia	Tunis	Embassy		
Uganda	Kampala	Embassy		
Zambia	Lusaka	Embassy	Countries: Malawi	
Zimbabwe	Harare	Embassy		

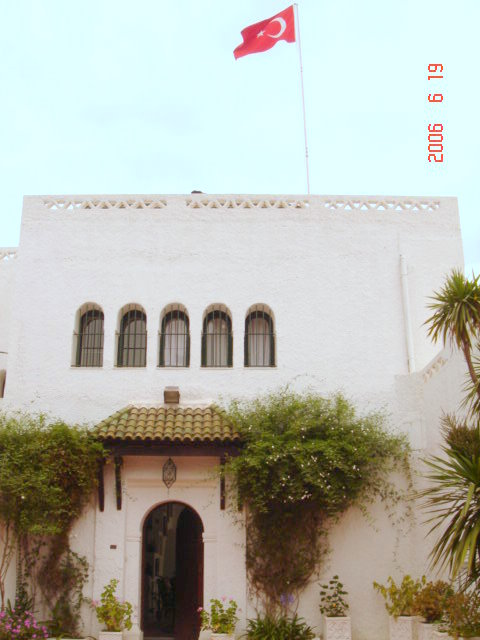
Embassy in Algiers

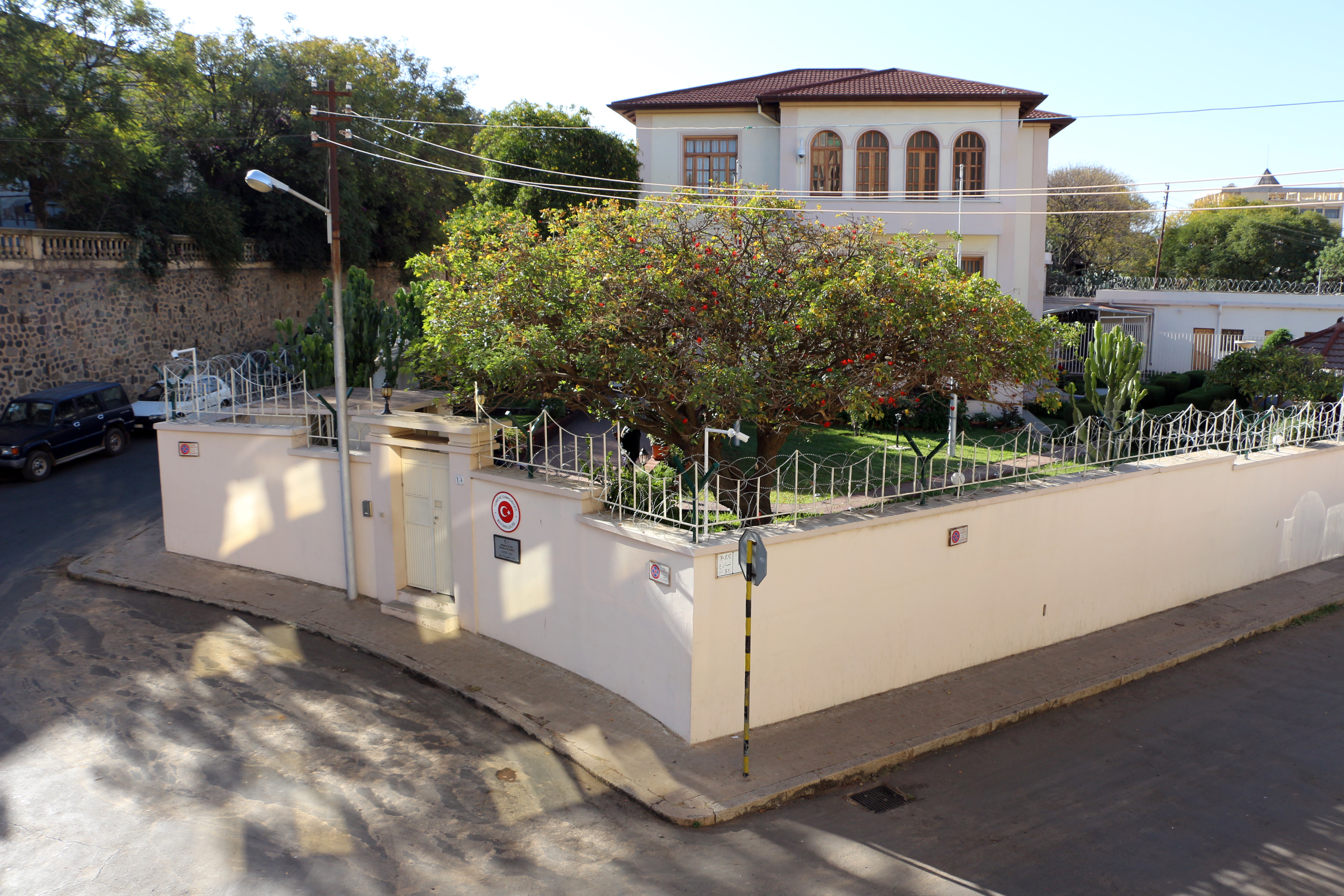
Embassy in Asmara

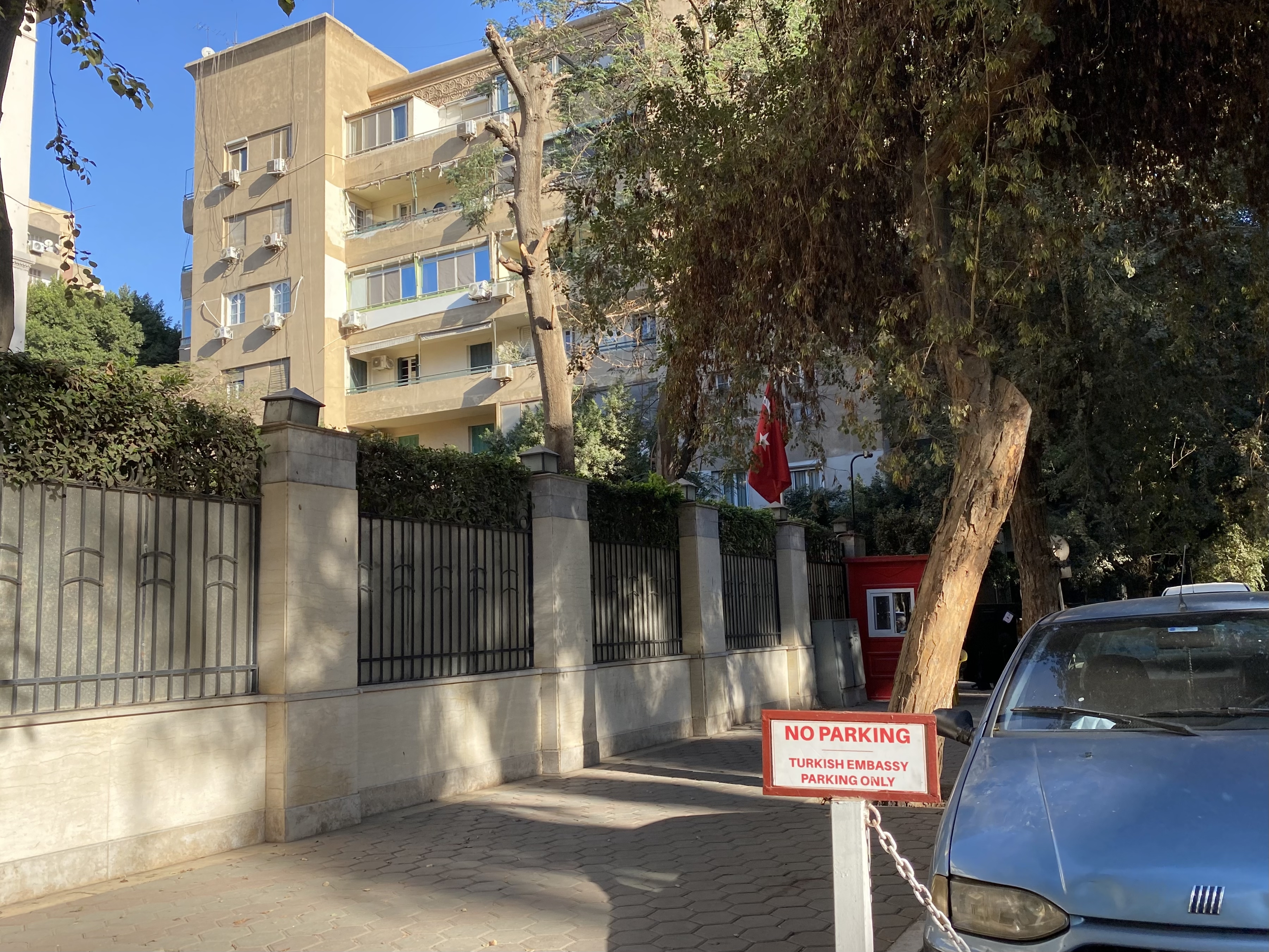
Embassy in Cairo

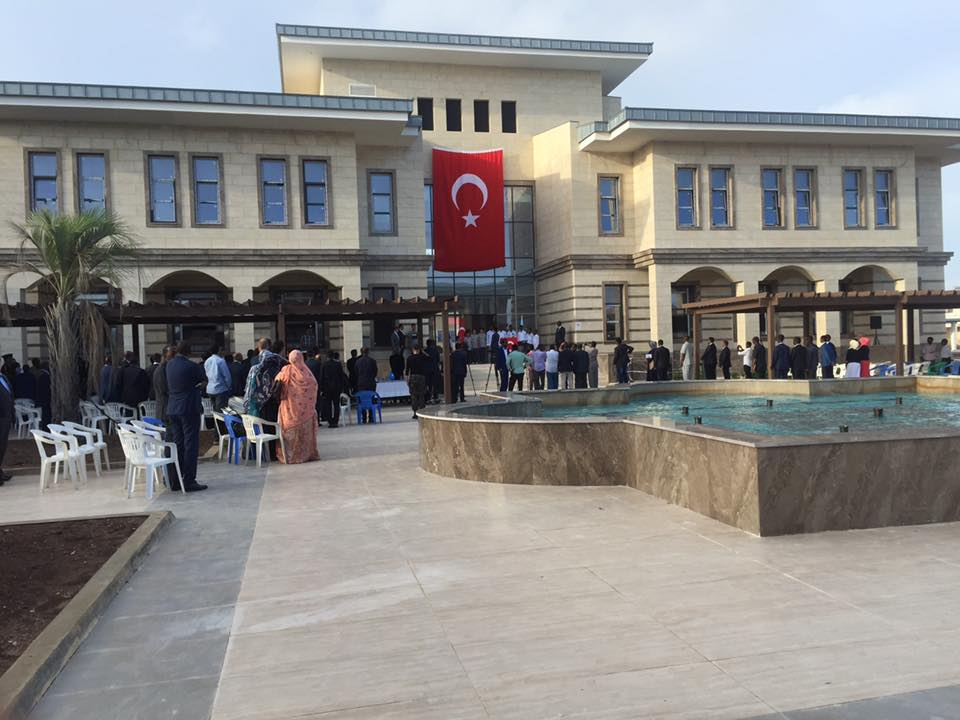
Embassy in Mogadishu

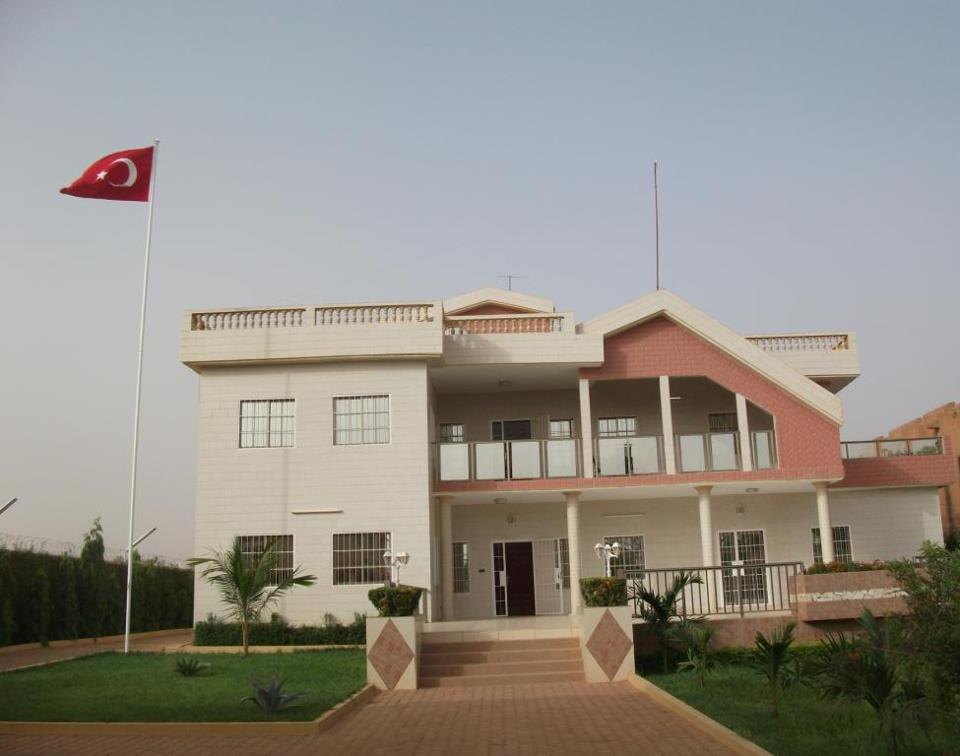
Embassy in Niamey

Embassy in Pretoria

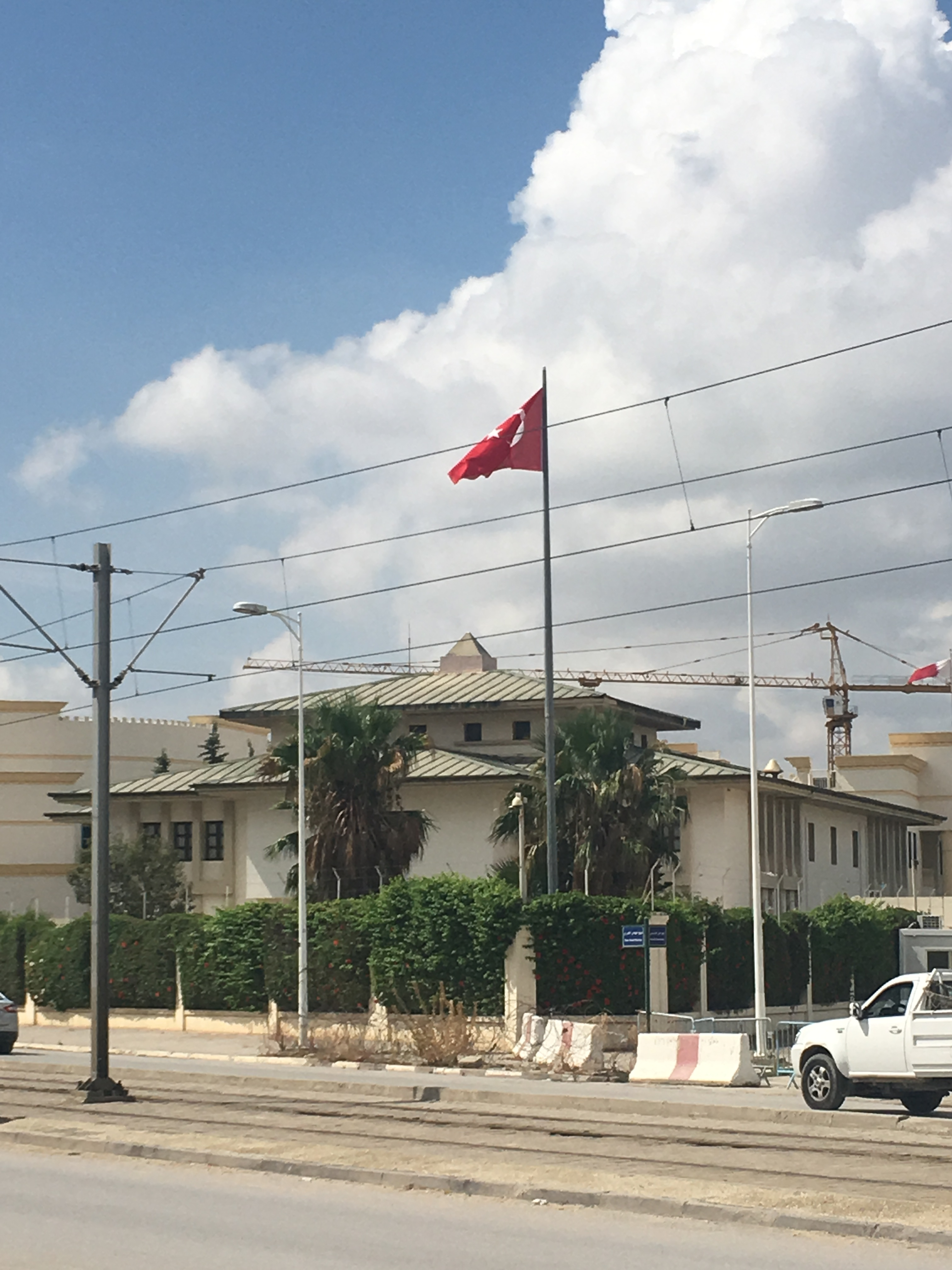
Embassy in Tunis

== Americas ==
Host country	Host city	Mission	Concurrent accreditation	Ref.
Argentina	Buenos Aires	Embassy		
Bolivia	La Paz	Embassy		
Brazil	Brasília	Embassy		
Brazil	São Paulo	Consulate–General		
Canada	Ottawa	Embassy		
Canada	Montreal	Consulate–General		
Canada	Toronto	Consulate–General		
Canada	Vancouver	Consulate–General		
Chile	Santiago	Embassy		
Colombia	Bogotá	Embassy		
Costa Rica	San José	Embassy		
Cuba	Havana	Embassy	Countries: Bahamas; Jamaica	
Dominican Republic	Santo Domingo	Embassy	Countries: Antigua and Barbuda; Dominica; Haiti; Saint Kitts and Nevis	
Ecuador	Quito	Embassy		
El Salvador	San Salvador	Embassy		
Guatemala	Guatemala City	Embassy	Countries: Belize; Honduras	
Mexico	Mexico City	Embassy		
Nicaragua	Managua	Embassy		
Panama	Panama City	Embassy		
Paraguay	Asunción	Embassy		
Peru	Lima	Embassy		
Trinidad and Tobago	Port of Spain	Embassy	Countries: Barbados; Grenada; Guyana; Saint Lucia; Saint Vincent and the Grenadines; Suriname	
United States	Washington, D.C.	Embassy		
United States	Boston	Consulate–General		
United States	Chicago	Consulate–General		
United States	Houston	Consulate–General		
United States	Los Angeles	Consulate–General		
United States	Miami	Consulate–General		
United States	New York City	Consulate–General		
Uruguay	Montevideo	Embassy		
Venezuela	Caracas	Embassy		

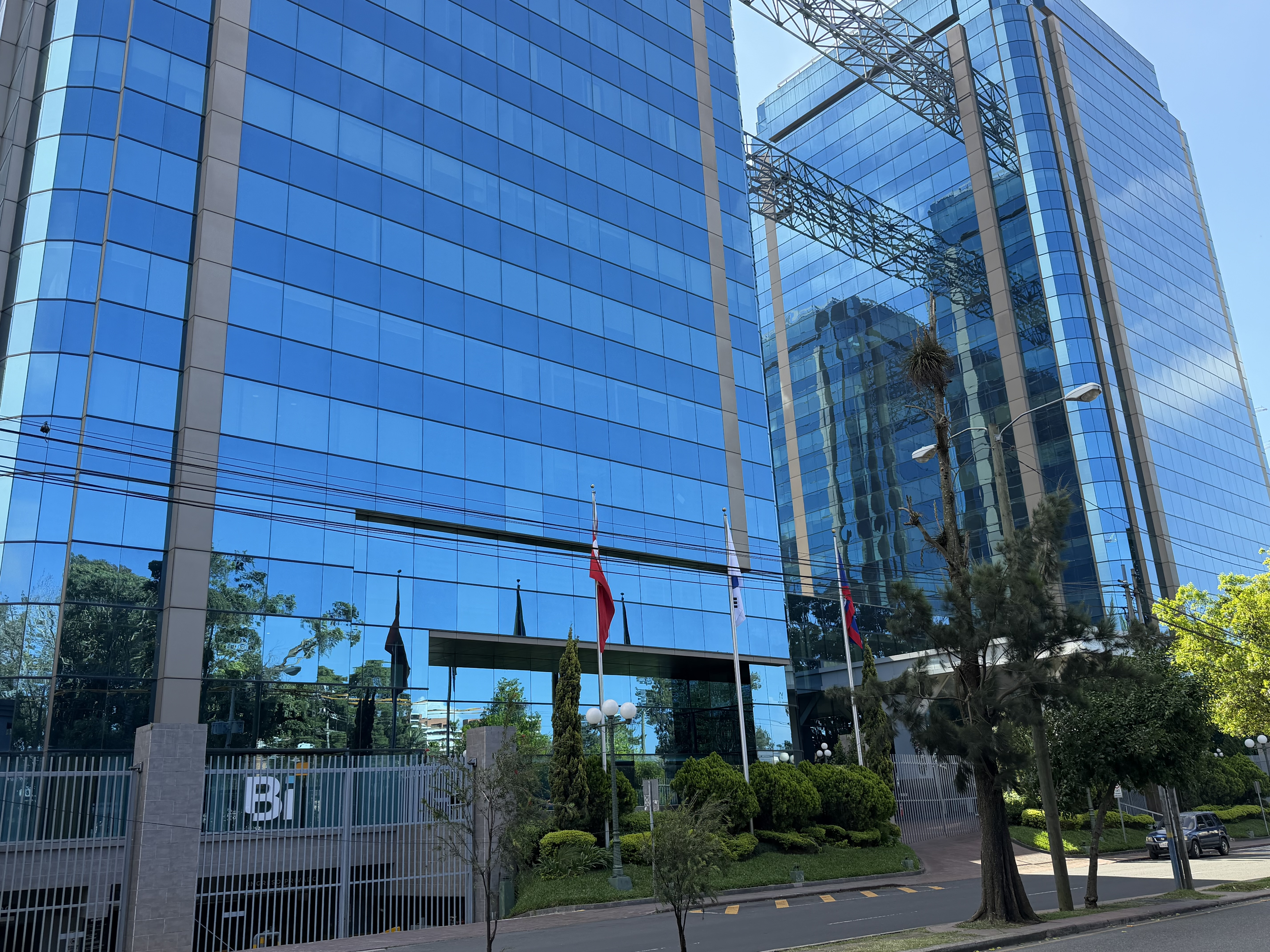
Building hosting the Embassy in Guatemala City

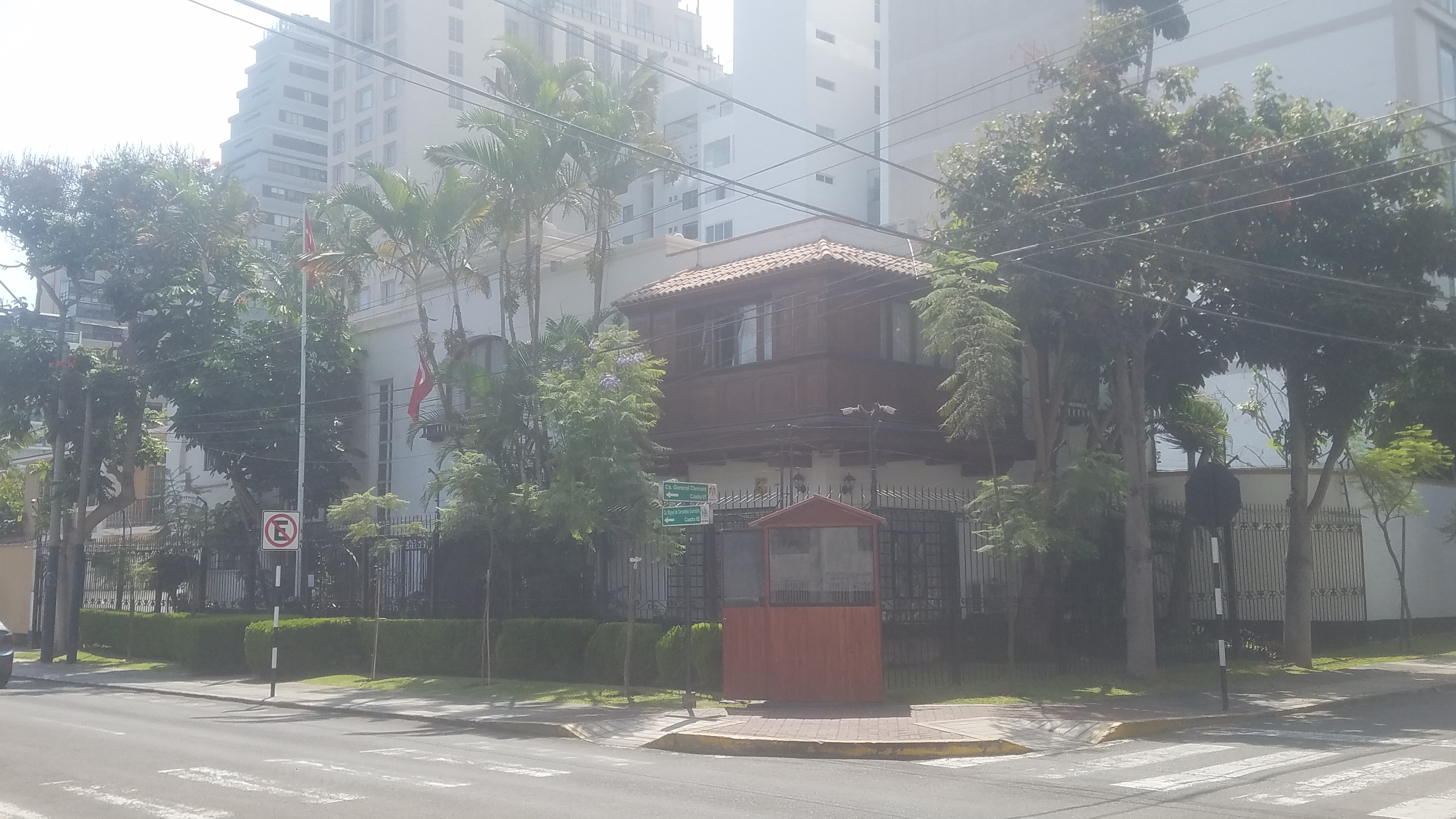
Embassy in Lima

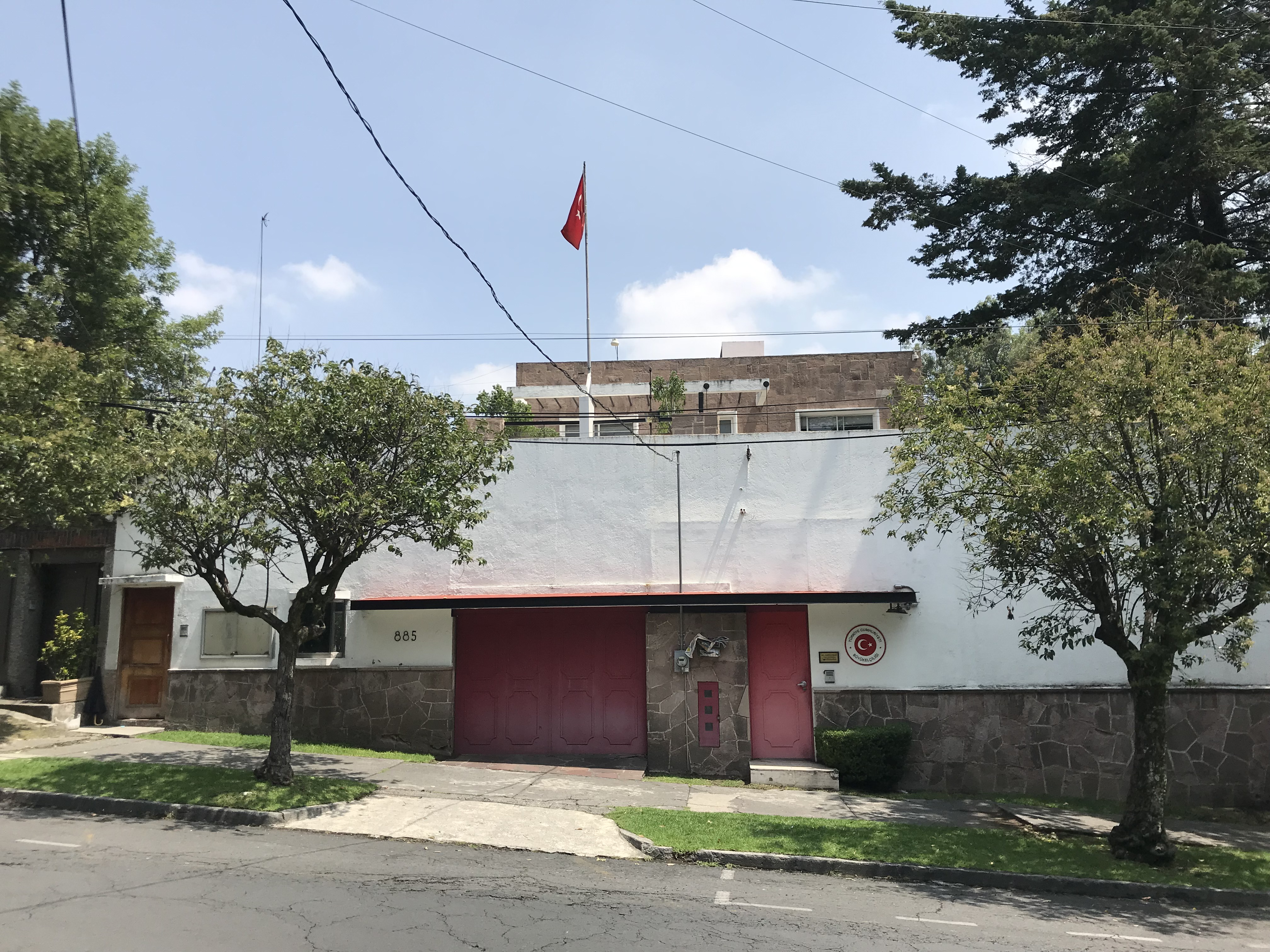
Embassy in Mexico City

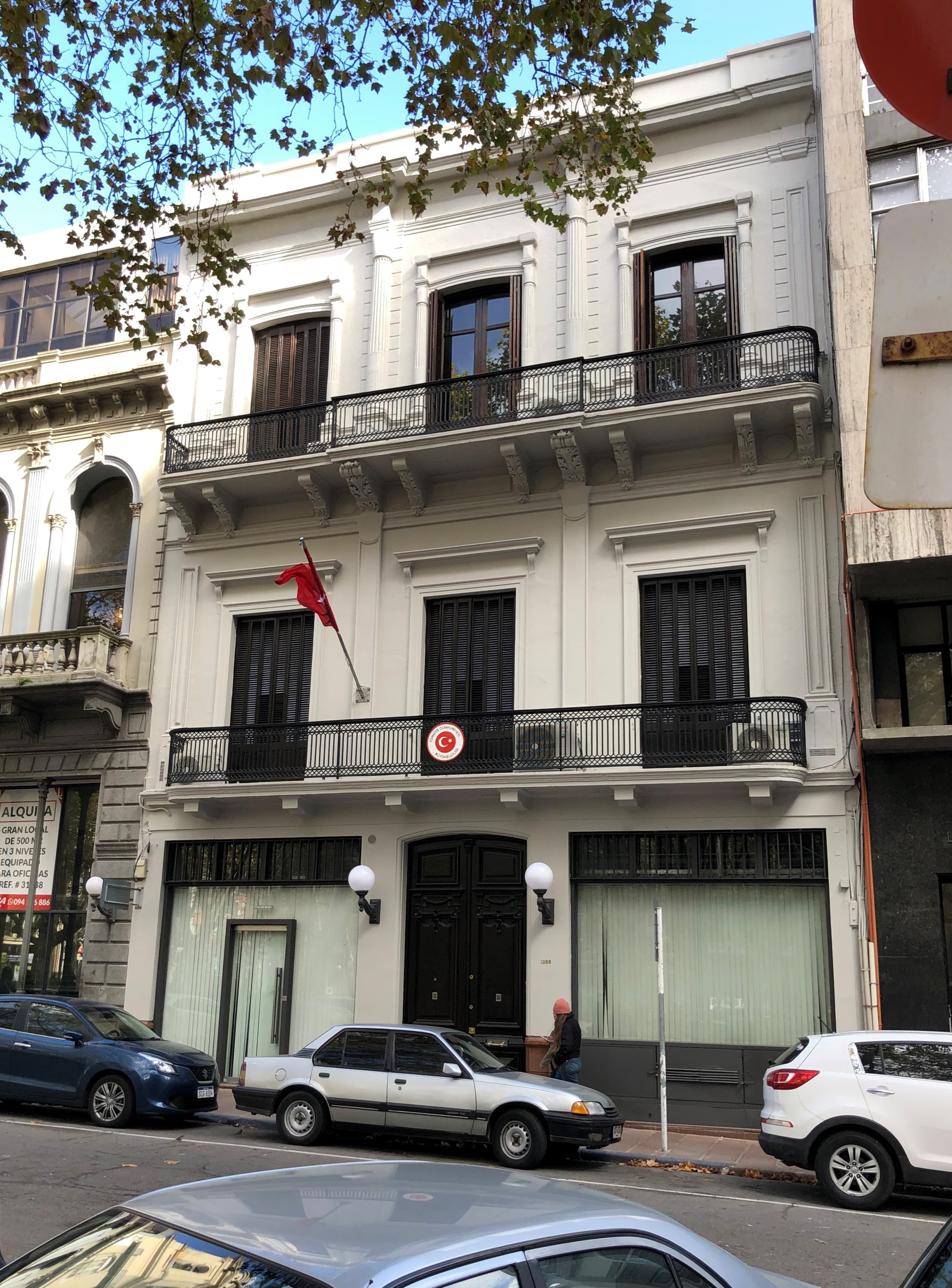
Embassy in Montevideo

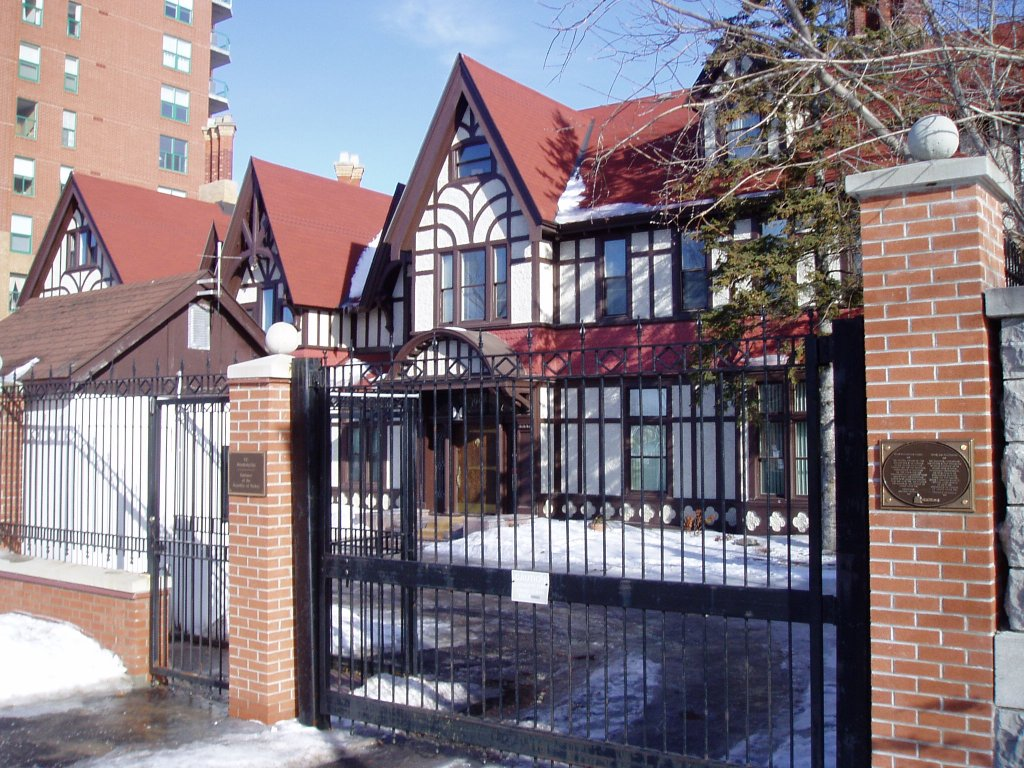
Embassy in Ottawa

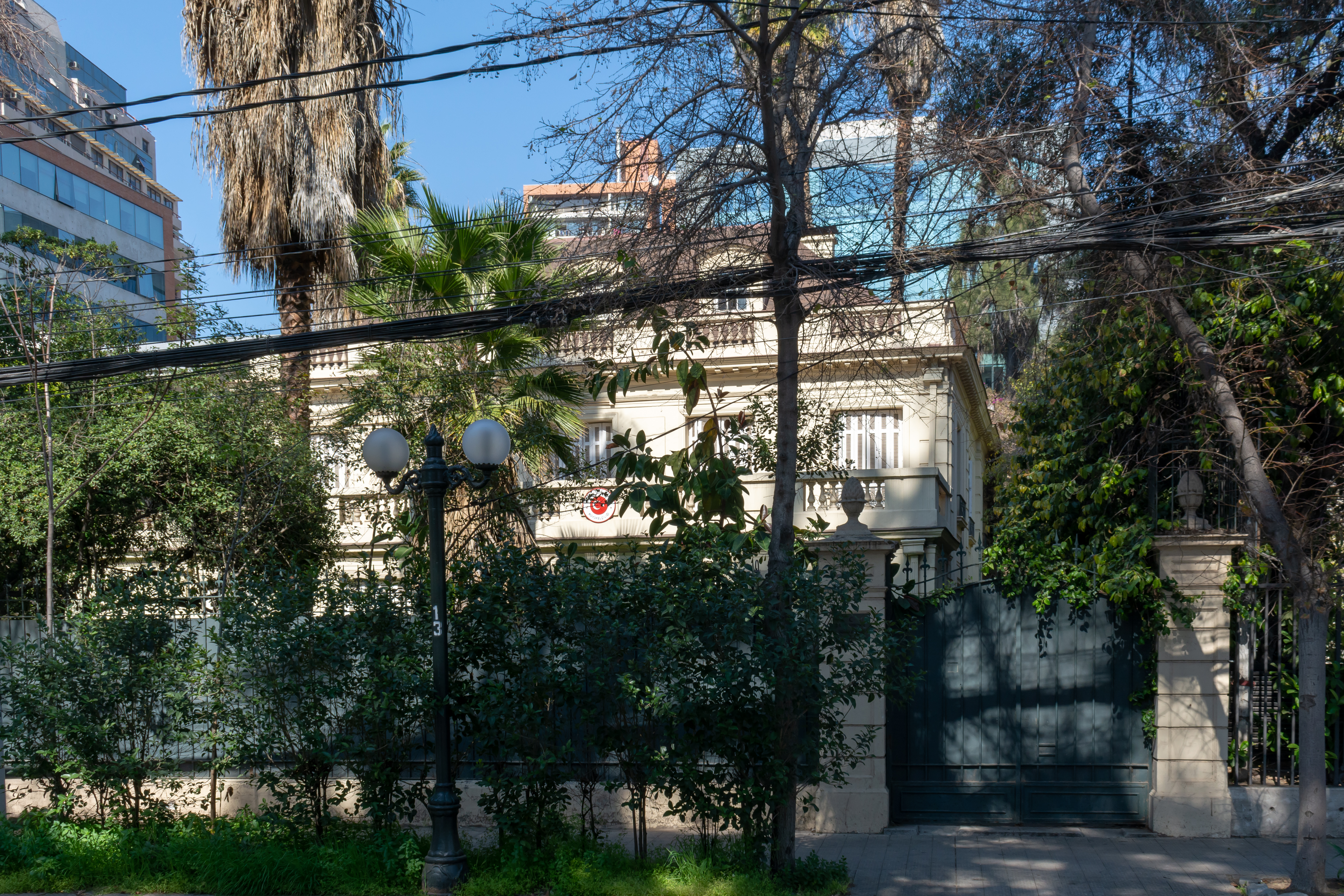
Embassy in Santiago de Chile

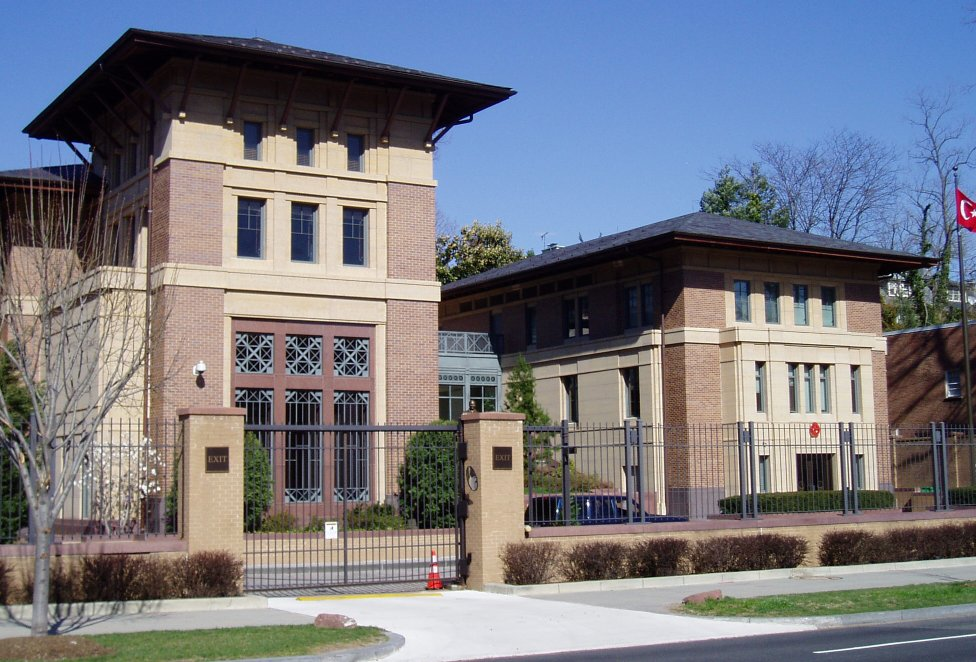
Embassy in Washington, D.C.

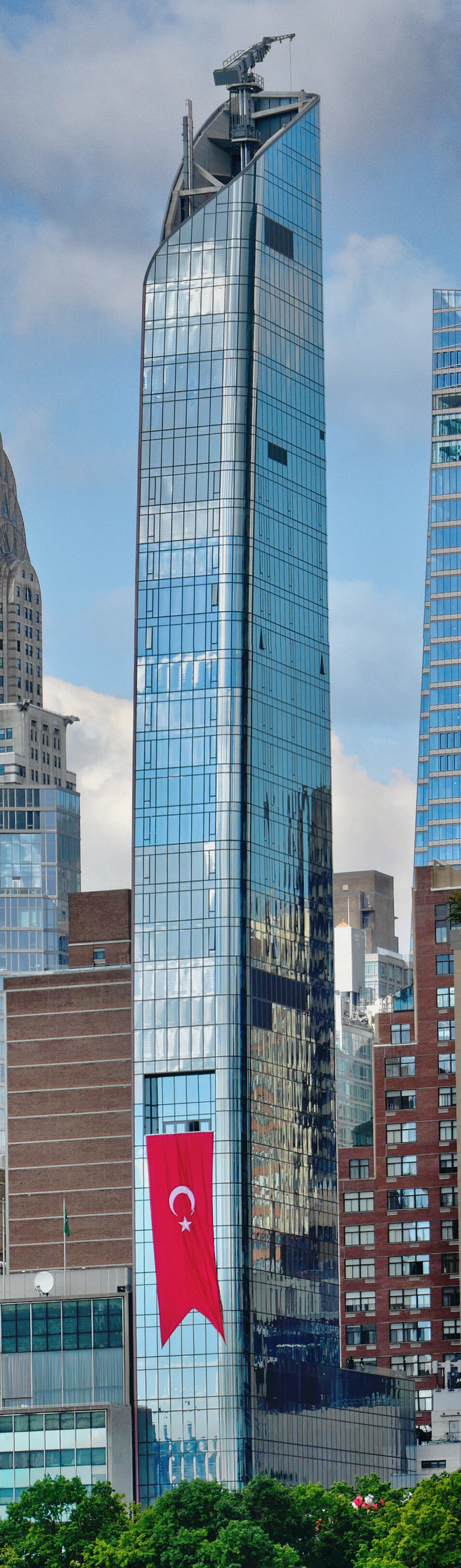
Building hosting the Consulate-General in New York City

== Asia ==
Host country	Host city	Mission	Concurrent accreditation	Ref.
Afghanistan	Kabul	Embassy		
Afghanistan	Herat	Consulate–General		
Afghanistan	Mazar-e Sharif	Consulate–General		
Azerbaijan	Baku	Embassy		
Azerbaijan	Ganja	Consulate–General		
Azerbaijan	Nakhchivan	Consulate–General		
Bahrain	Manama	Embassy		
Bangladesh	Dhaka	Embassy		
Brunei	Bandar Seri Begawan	Embassy		
Cambodia	Phnom Penh	Embassy		
China	Beijing	Embassy		
China	Chengdu	Consulate–General		
China	Guangzhou	Consulate–General		
China	Hong Kong	Consulate–General		
China	Shanghai	Consulate–General		
Georgia	Tbilisi	Embassy		
Georgia	Batumi	Consulate–General		
India	New Delhi	Embassy	Countries: Bhutan; Nepal	
India	Hyderabad	Consulate–General	Countries: Bhutan; Nepal	
India	Mumbai	Consulate–General	Countries: Bhutan; Nepal	
Indonesia	Jakarta	Embassy	Countries: East Timor	
Iran	Tehran	Embassy		
Iran	Mashhad	Consulate–General		
Iran	Tabriz	Consulate–General		
Iran	Urmia	Consulate–General		
Iraq	Baghdad	Embassy		
Iraq	Basra	Consulate–General		
Iraq	Erbil	Consulate–General		
Iraq	Mosul	Consulate–General		
Iraq	Najaf	Consulate–General		
Iraq	Sulaymaniyah	Consular Agency		
Israel	Tel Aviv	Embassy		
Japan	Tokyo	Embassy	Countries: Federated States of Micronesia; Palau	
Japan	Nagoya	Consulate–General	Countries: Federated States of Micronesia; Palau	
Jordan	Amman	Embassy		
Kazakhstan	Astana	Embassy		
Kazakhstan	Aktau	Consulate–General		
Kazakhstan	Almaty	Consulate–General		
Kazakhstan	Turkistan	Consulate–General		
Kuwait	Kuwait City	Embassy		
Kyrgyzstan	Bishkek	Embassy		
Laos	Vientiane	Embassy		
Lebanon	Beirut	Embassy		
Malaysia	Kuala Lumpur	Embassy		
Mongolia	Ulaanbaatar	Embassy		
Myanmar	Yangon	Embassy		
Oman	Muscat	Embassy		
Pakistan	Islamabad	Embassy		
Pakistan	Karachi	Consulate–General		
Pakistan	Lahore	Consulate–General		
Palestine	Jerusalem	Consulate–General		
Philippines	Manila	Embassy		
Qatar	Doha	Embassy		
Saudi Arabia	Riyadh	Embassy		
Saudi Arabia	Jeddah	Consulate–General		
Singapore	Singapore	Embassy		
South Korea	Seoul	Embassy	Countries: North Korea	
Sri Lanka	Colombo	Embassy	Countries: Maldives	
Syria	Damascus	Embassy		
Syria	Aleppo	Consulate–General		
Taiwan	Taipei	Trade Office		
Tajikistan	Dushanbe	Embassy		
Thailand	Bangkok	Embassy		
Turkmenistan	Ashgabat	Embassy		
United Arab Emirates	Abu Dhabi	Embassy		
United Arab Emirates	Dubai	Consulate–General		
Uzbekistan	Tashkent	Embassy		
Uzbekistan	Samarkand	Consulate–General		
Vietnam	Hanoi	Embassy		
Yemen	Sana'a	Embassy		

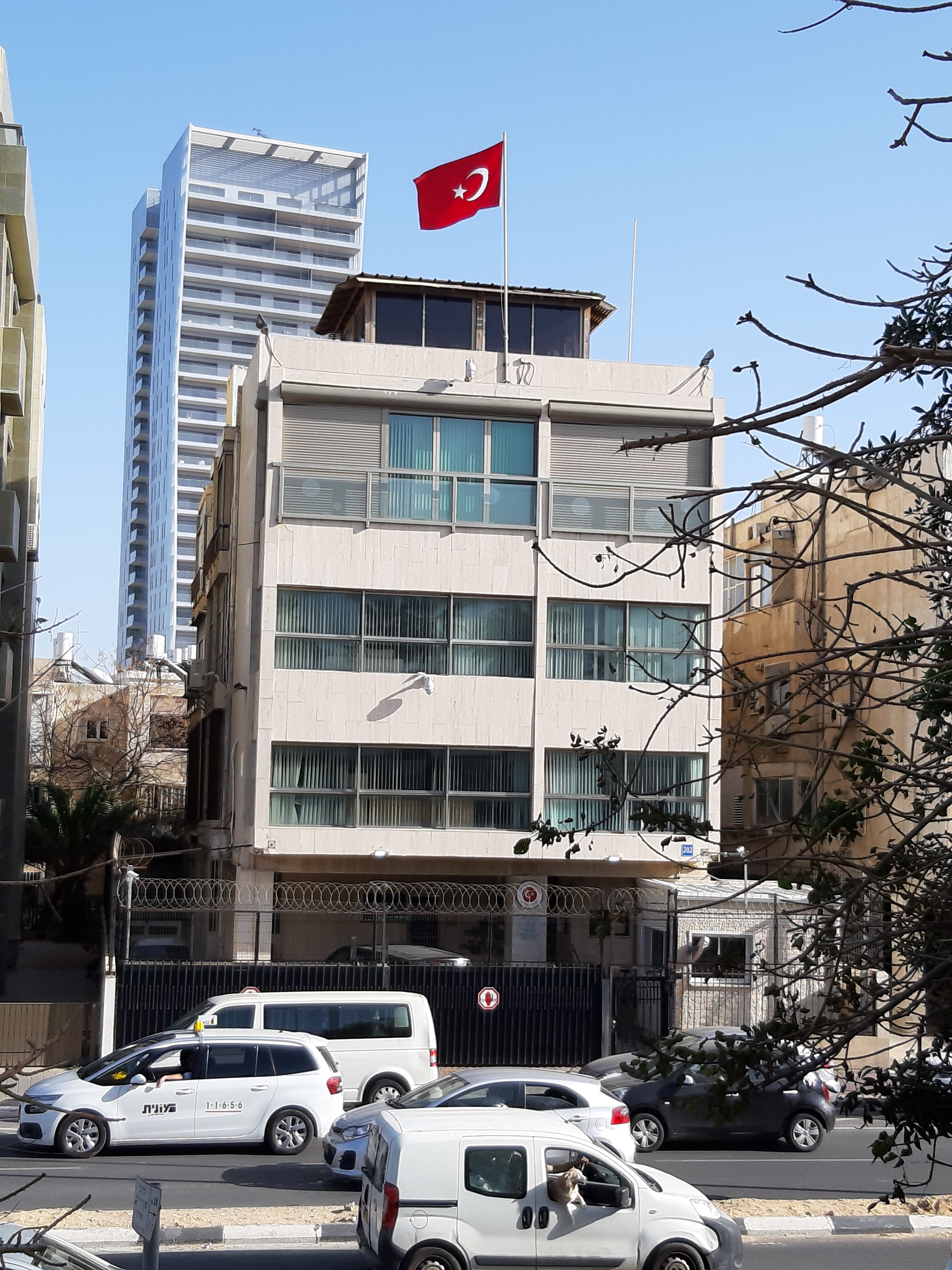
Embassy in Tel-Aviv

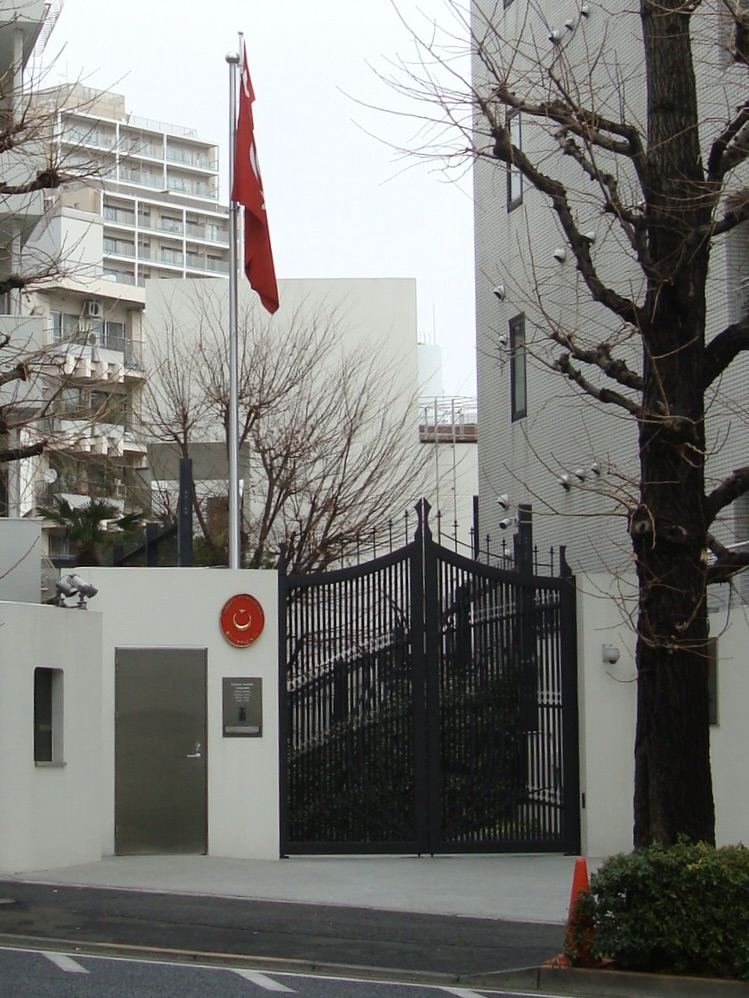
Embassy in Tokyo

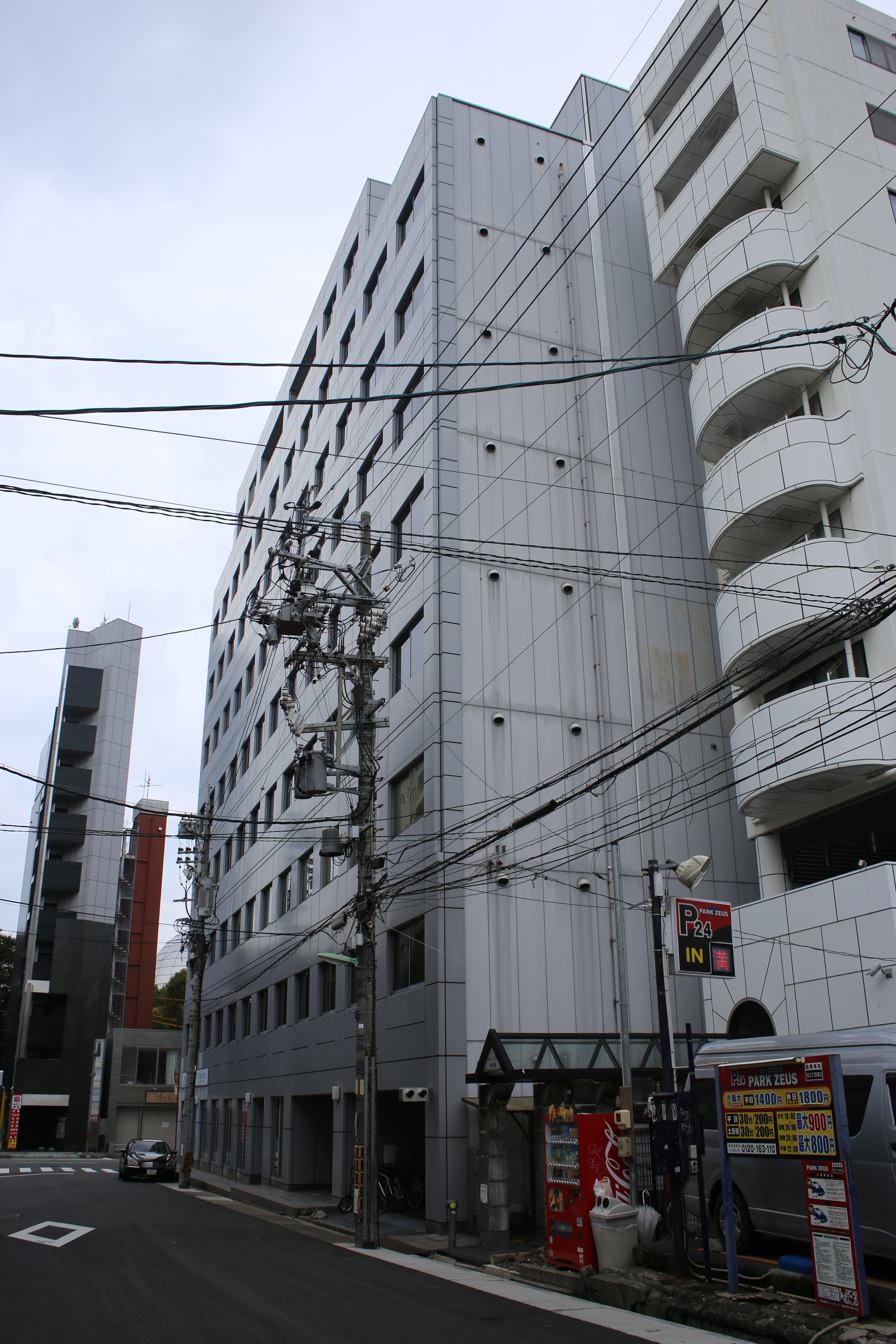
Consulate–General in Nagoya

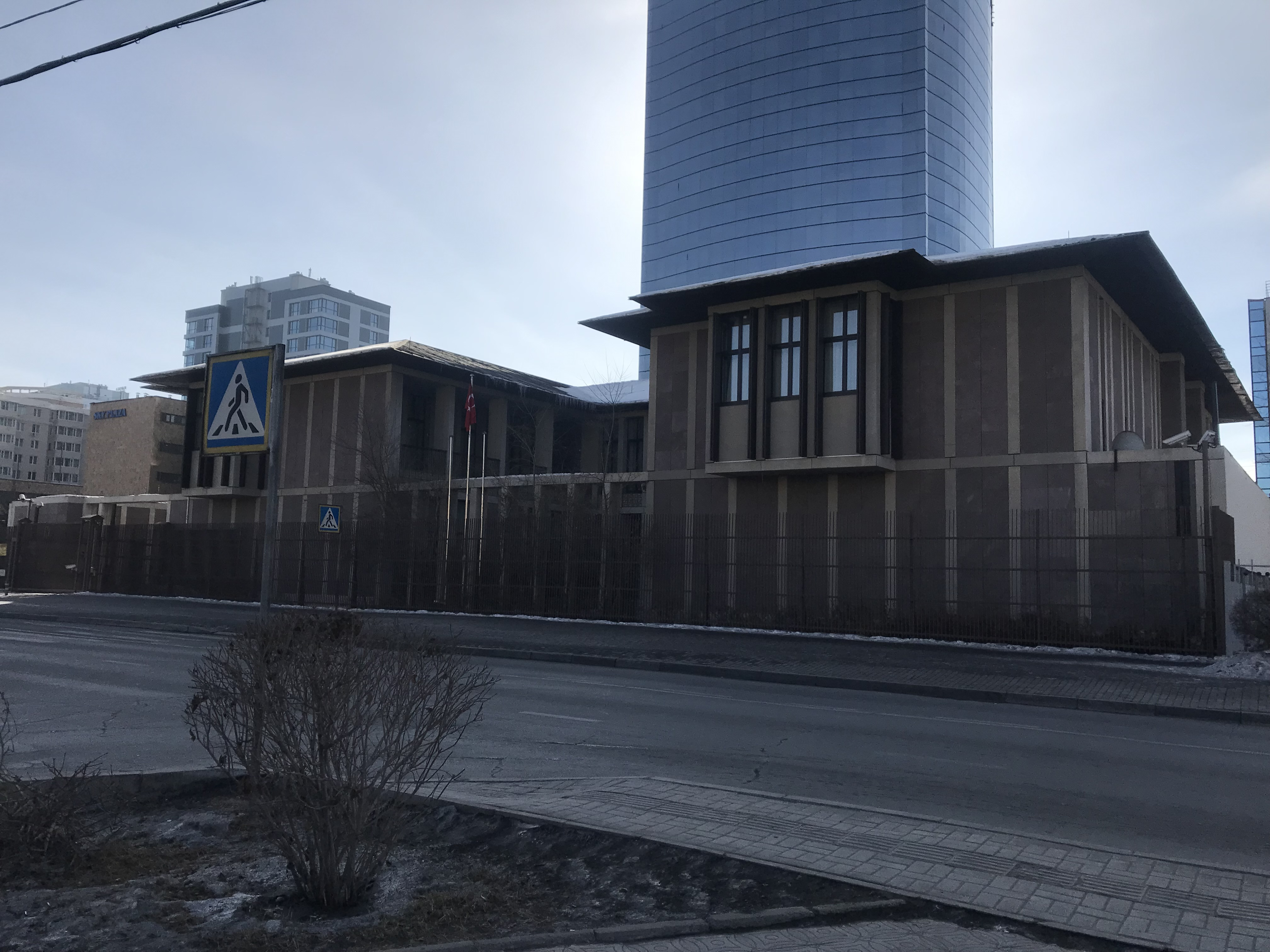
Embassy in Ulaanbaatar

== Europe ==
Host country	Host city	Mission	Concurrent accreditation	Ref.
Albania	Tirana	Embassy		
Austria	Vienna	Embassy		
Austria	Bregenz	Consulate–General		
Austria	Salzburg	Consulate–General		
Austria	Vienna	Consulate–General		
Belarus	Minsk	Embassy		
Belgium	Brussels	Embassy		
Belgium	Antwerp	Consulate–General		
Belgium	Brussels	Consulate–General		
Bosnia and Herzegovina	Sarajevo	Embassy		
Bosnia and Herzegovina	Banja Luka	Consulate–General		
Bosnia and Herzegovina	Mostar	Consulate–General		
Bulgaria	Sofia	Embassy		
Bulgaria	Burgas	Consulate–General		
Bulgaria	Plovdiv	Consulate–General		
Croatia	Zagreb	Embassy		
Czech Republic	Prague	Embassy		
Denmark	Copenhagen	Embassy		
Estonia	Tallinn	Embassy		
Finland	Helsinki	Embassy		
France	Paris	Embassy	Countries: Monaco	
France	Bordeaux	Consulate–General	Countries: Monaco	
France	Lyon	Consulate–General	Countries: Monaco	
France	Marseille	Consulate–General	Countries: Monaco	
France	Nantes	Consulate–General	Countries: Monaco	
France	Paris	Consulate–General	Countries: Monaco	
France	Strasbourg	Consulate–General	Countries: Monaco	
Germany	Berlin	Embassy		
Germany	Berlin	Consulate–General		
Germany	Cologne	Consulate–General		
Germany	Düsseldorf	Consulate–General		
Germany	Essen	Consulate–General		
Germany	Frankfurt	Consulate–General		
Germany	Hamburg	Consulate–General		
Germany	Hanover	Consulate–General		
Germany	Karlsruhe	Consulate–General		
Germany	Kassel	Consulate–General		
Germany	Mainz	Consulate–General		
Germany	Munich	Consulate–General		
Germany	Münster	Consulate–General		
Germany	Nuremberg	Consulate–General		
Germany	Stuttgart	Consulate–General		
Greece	Athens	Embassy		
Greece	Athens	Consulate–General		
Greece	Komotini	Consulate–General		
Greece	Rhodes	Consulate–General		
Greece	Thessaloniki	Consulate–General		
Holy See	Rome	Embassy (Note: The Turkish Embassy to the Holy See is located outside Vatican territory in Rome.)		
Hungary	Budapest	Embassy		
Iceland	Reykjavík	Embassy		
Ireland	Dublin	Embassy		
Italy	Rome	Embassy	Countries: San Marino	
Italy	Milan	Consulate–General	Countries: San Marino	
Kosovo	Pristina	Embassy		
Kosovo	Prizren	Consulate–General		
Latvia	Riga	Embassy		
Lithuania	Vilnius	Embassy		
Luxembourg	Luxembourg	Embassy		
Malta	Valletta	Embassy		
Moldova	Chişinău	Embassy		
Moldova	Comrat	Consulate–General		
Montenegro	Podgorica	Embassy		
Netherlands	The Hague	Embassy		
Netherlands	Amsterdam	Consulate–General		
Netherlands	Deventer	Consulate–General		
Netherlands	Rotterdam	Consulate–General		
Northern Cyprus	North Nicosia	Embassy		
Northern Cyprus	Famagusta	Consulate–General		
North Macedonia	Skopje	Embassy		
Norway	Oslo	Embassy		
Poland	Warsaw	Embassy		
Portugal	Lisbon	Embassy		
Romania	Bucharest	Embassy		
Romania	Constanţa	Consulate–General		
Russia	Moscow	Embassy		
Russia	Kazan	Consulate–General		
Russia	Krasnodar	Consulate–General		
Russia	Saint Petersburg	Consulate–General		
Serbia	Belgrade	Embassy		
Serbia	Novi Pazar	Consulate–General		
Serbia	Niš	Consular Office		
Slovakia	Bratislava	Embassy		
Slovenia	Ljubljana	Embassy		
Spain	Madrid	Embassy	Countries: Andorra	
Spain	Barcelona	Consulate–General	Countries: Andorra	
Sweden	Stockholm	Embassy		
Sweden	Gothenburg	Consulate–General		
Switzerland	Bern	Embassy	Countries: Liechtenstein	
Switzerland	Geneva	Consulate–General	Countries: Liechtenstein	
Switzerland	Zürich	Consulate–General	Countries: Liechtenstein	
Ukraine	Kyiv	Embassy		
Ukraine	Odesa	Consulate–General		
United Kingdom	London	Embassy		
United Kingdom	Edinburgh	Consulate–General		
United Kingdom	London	Consulate–General		
United Kingdom	Manchester	Consulate–General		

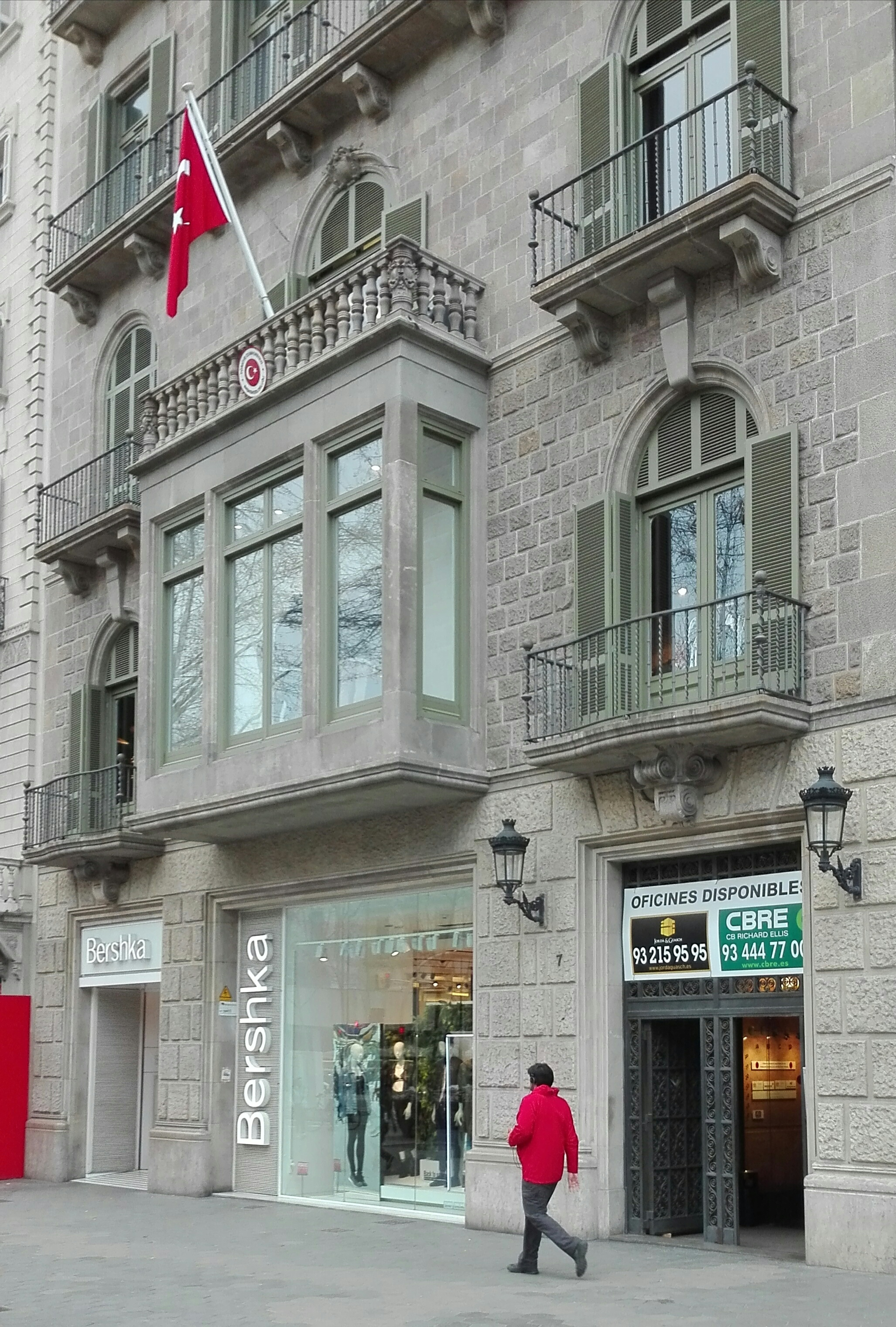
Consulate–General in Barcelona

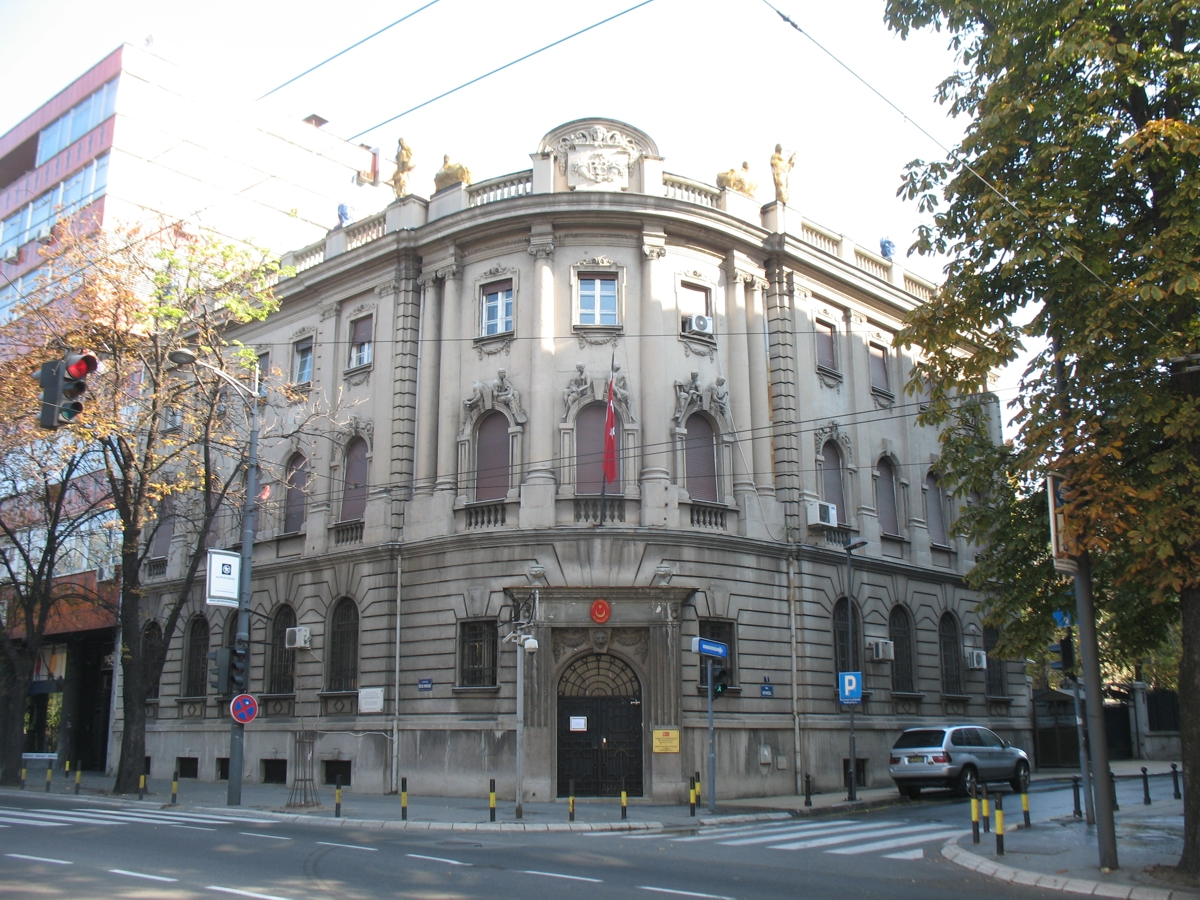
Embassy in Belgrade

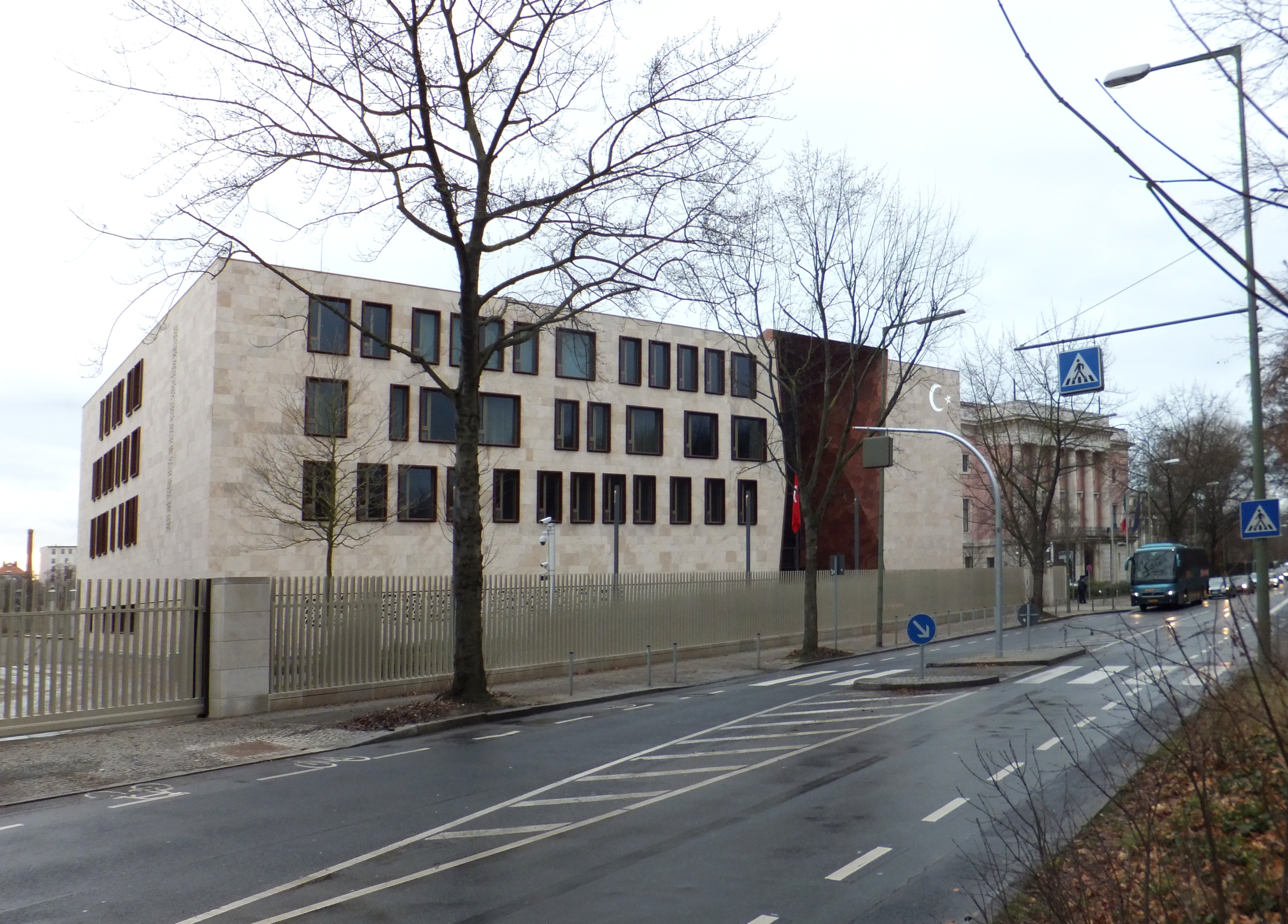
Embassy in Berlin

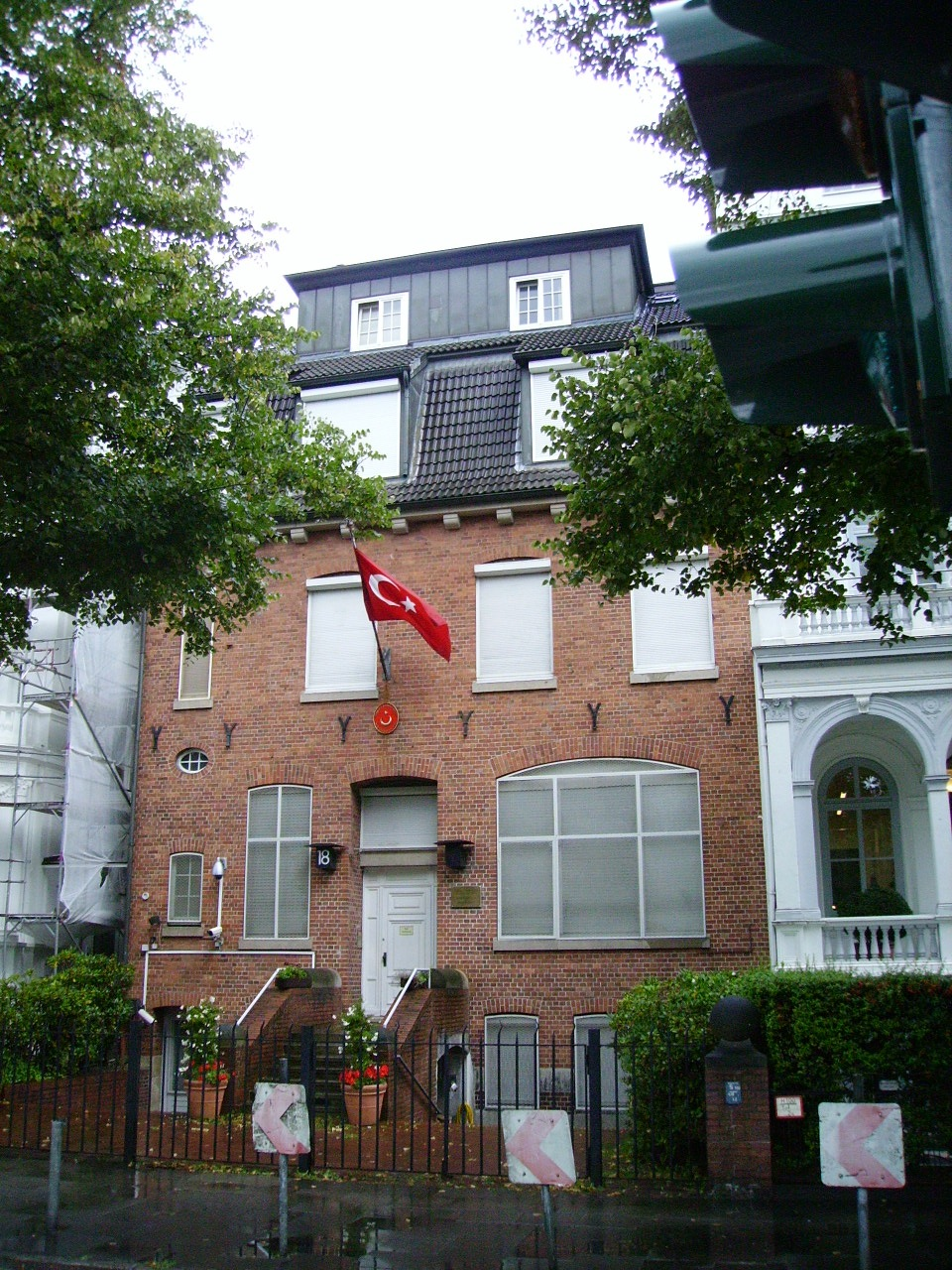
Consulate–General in Hamburg

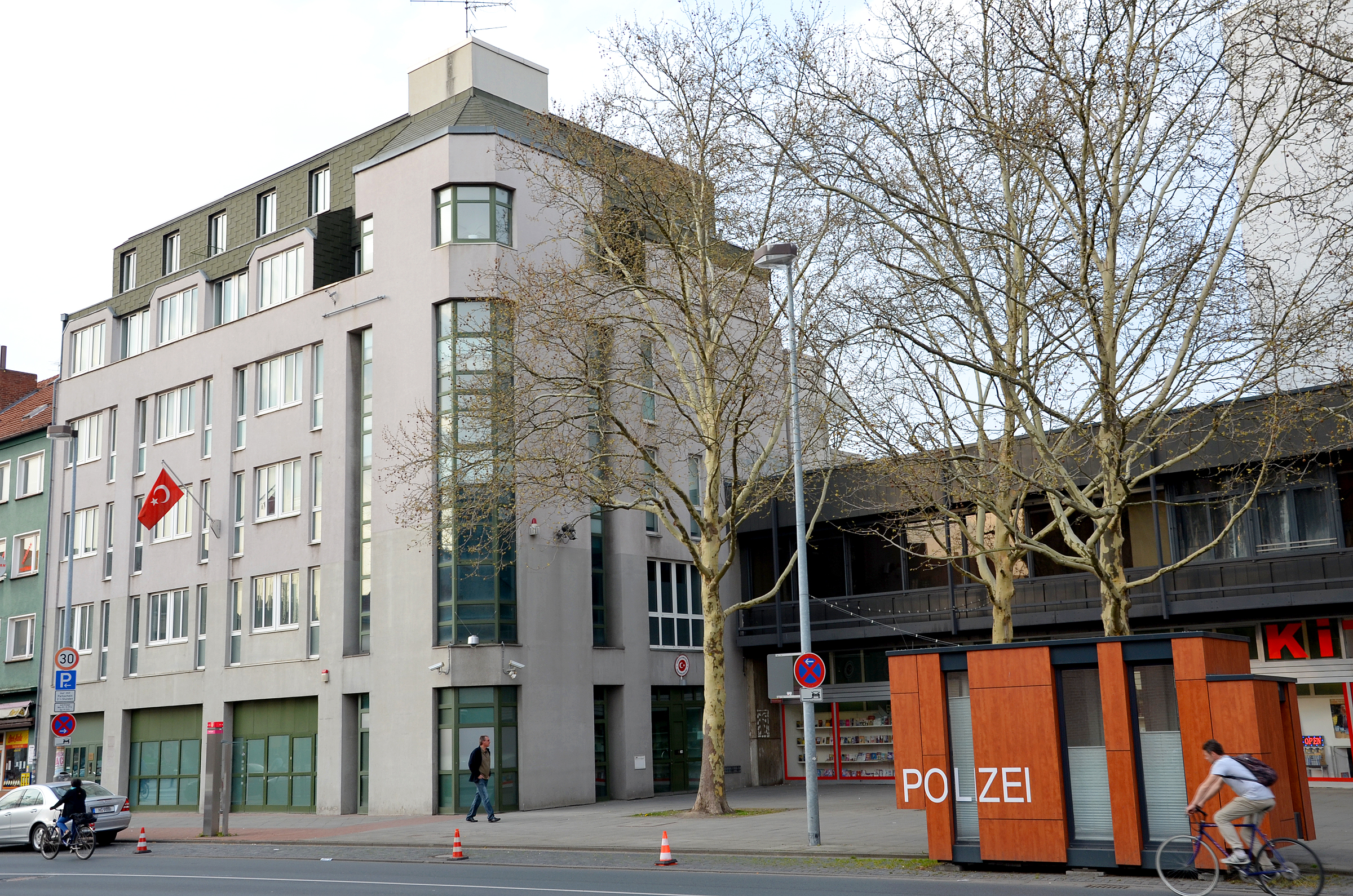
Consulate–General in Hanover

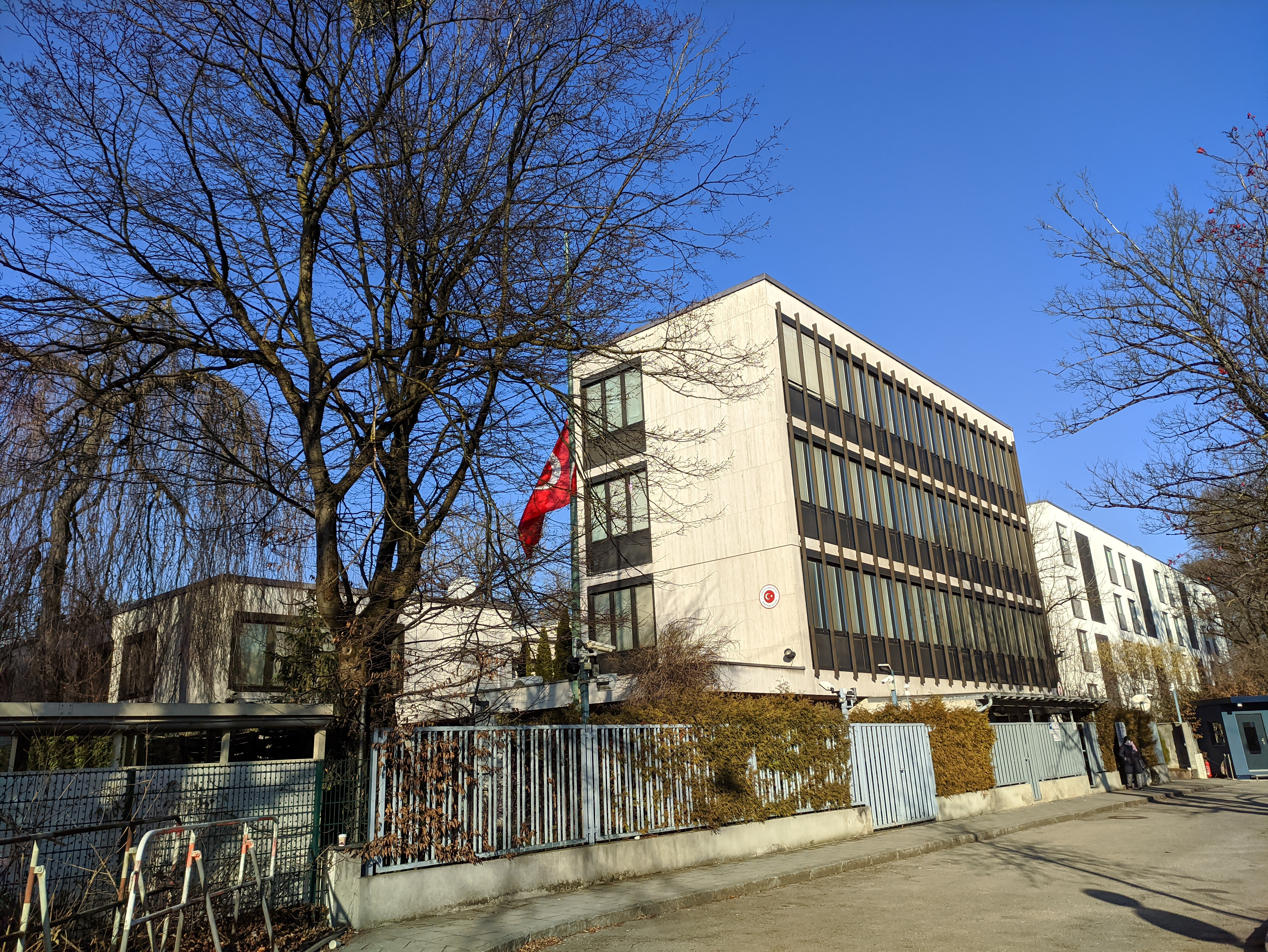
Consulate-General in Munich

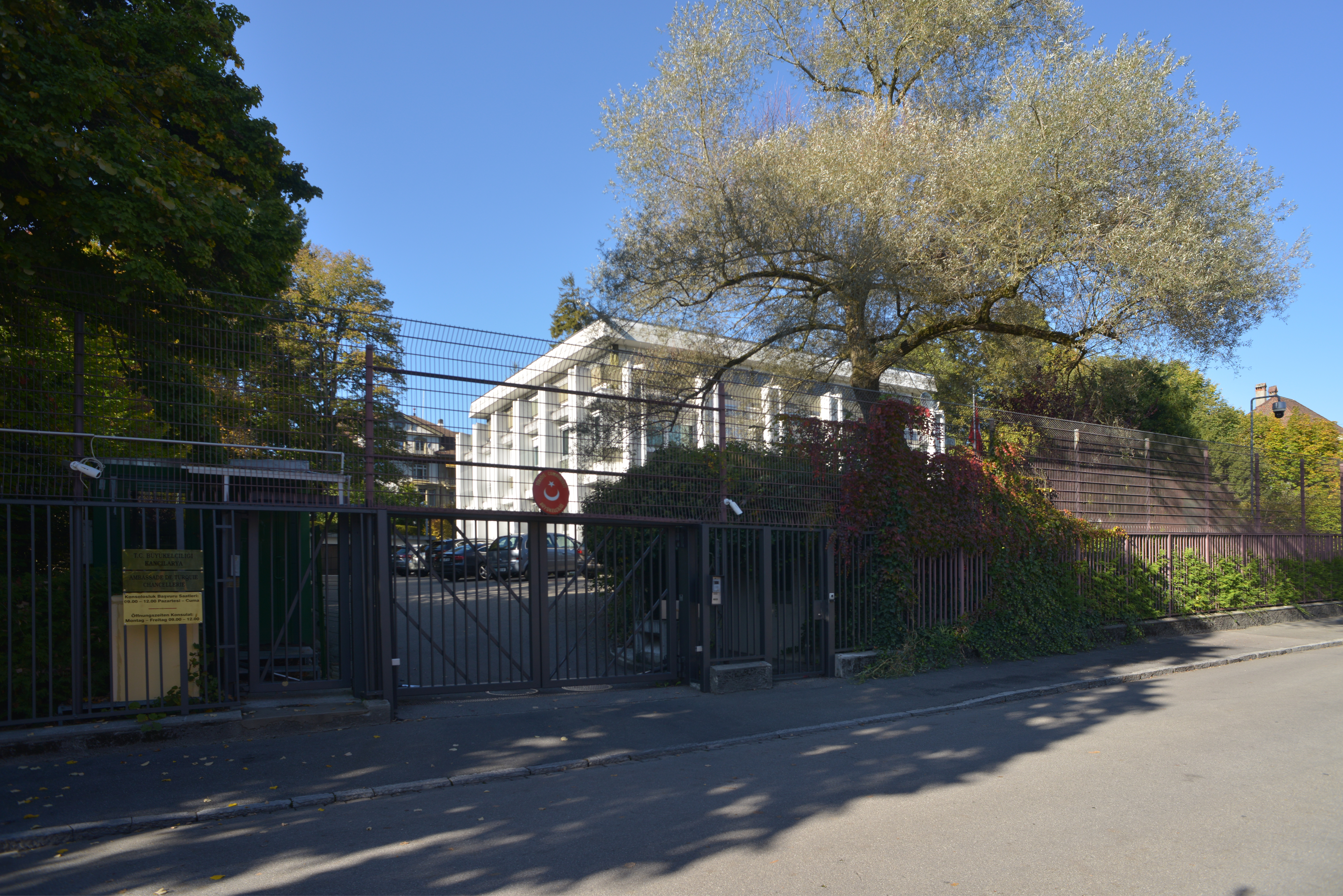
Embassy in Bern

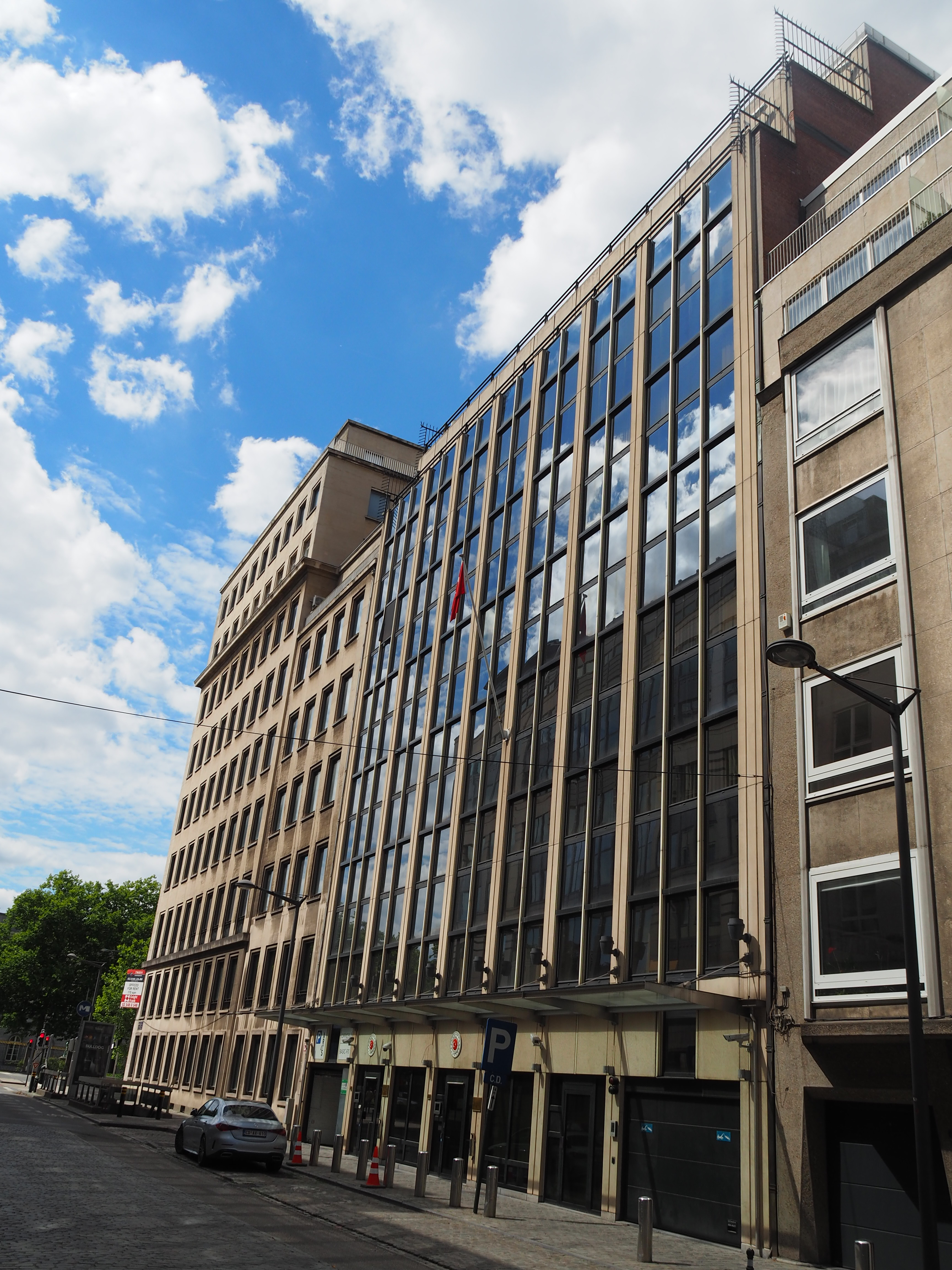
Embassy in Brussels

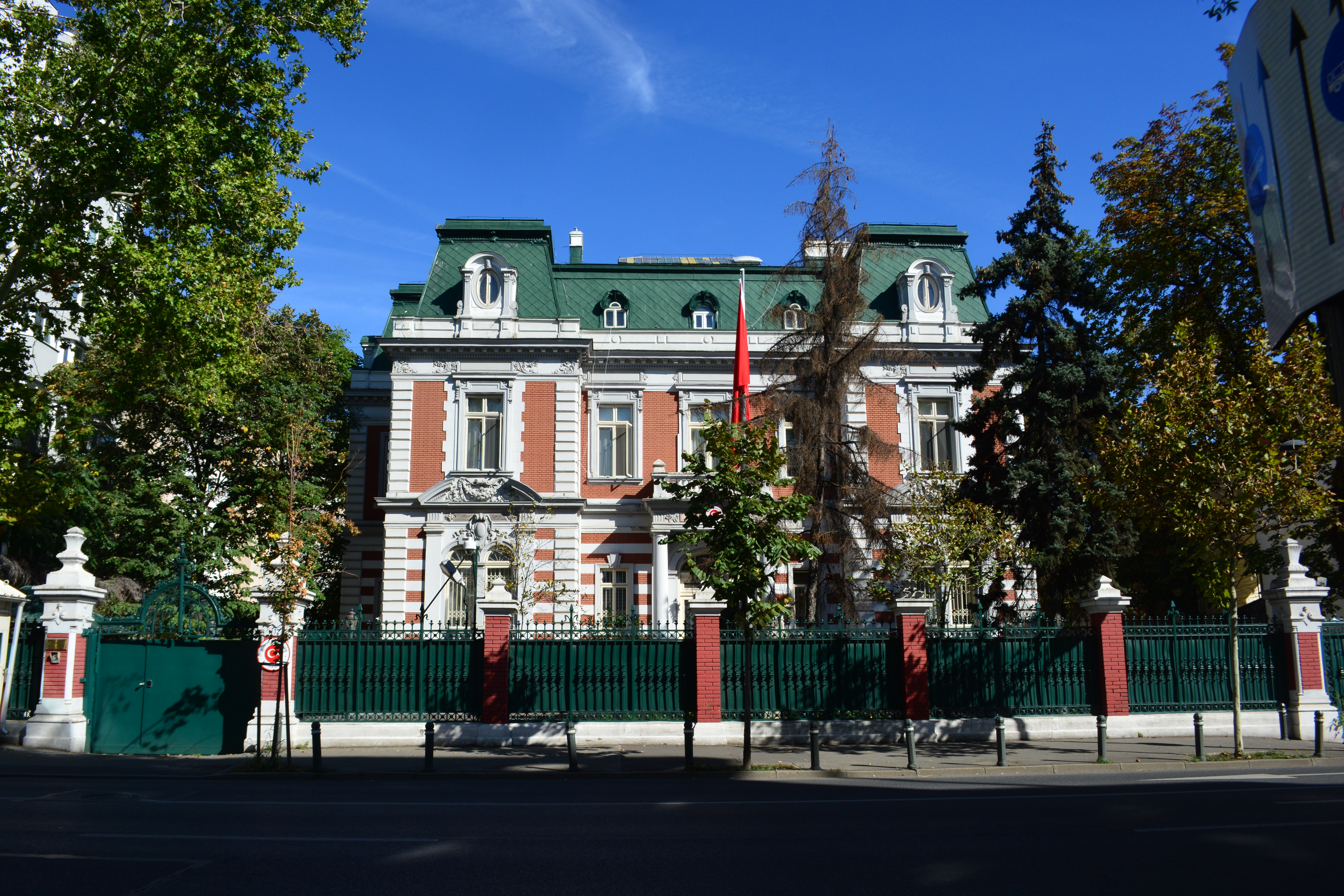
Embassy in Bucharest

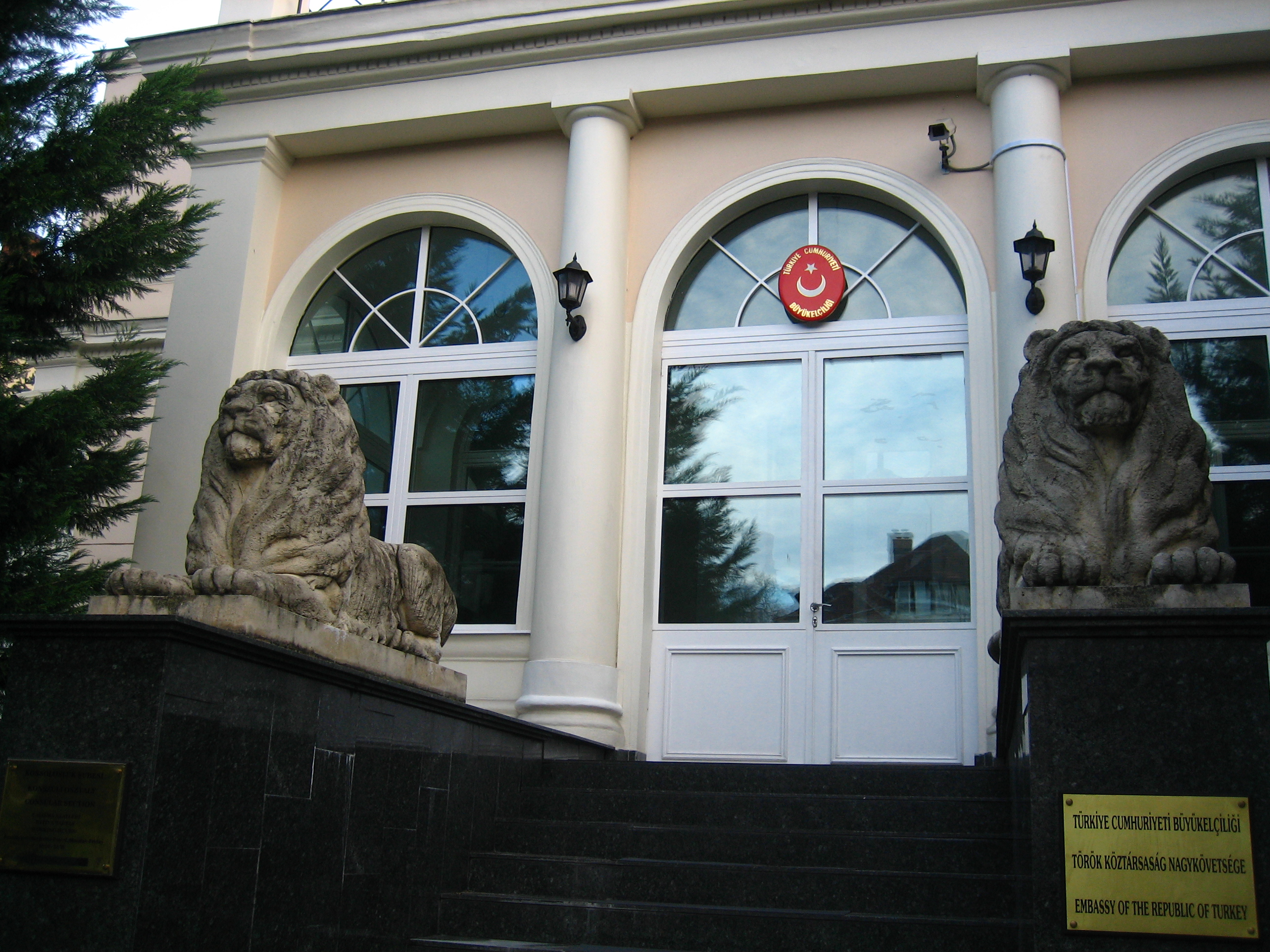
Embassy in Budapest

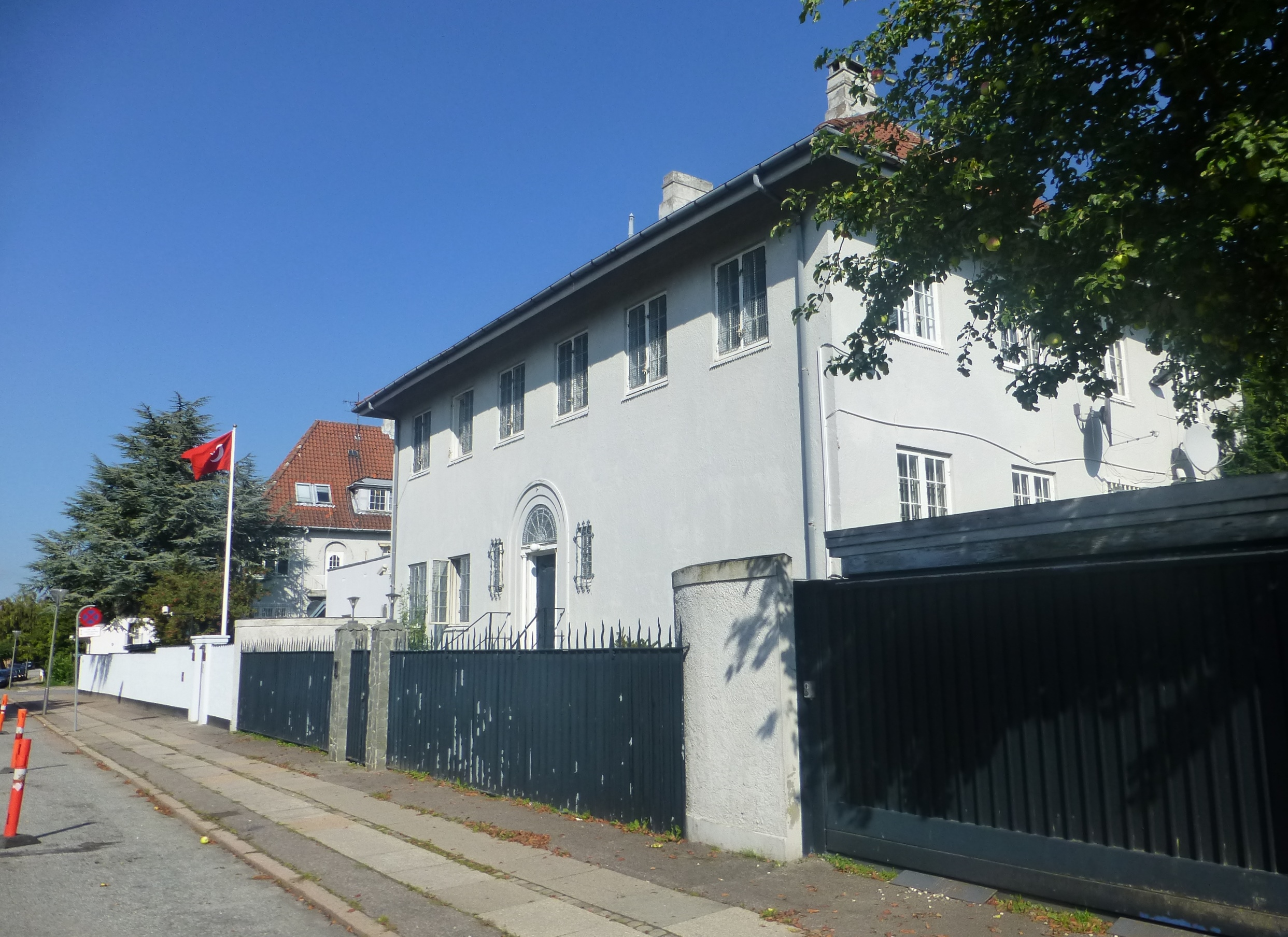
Embassy in Copenhagen

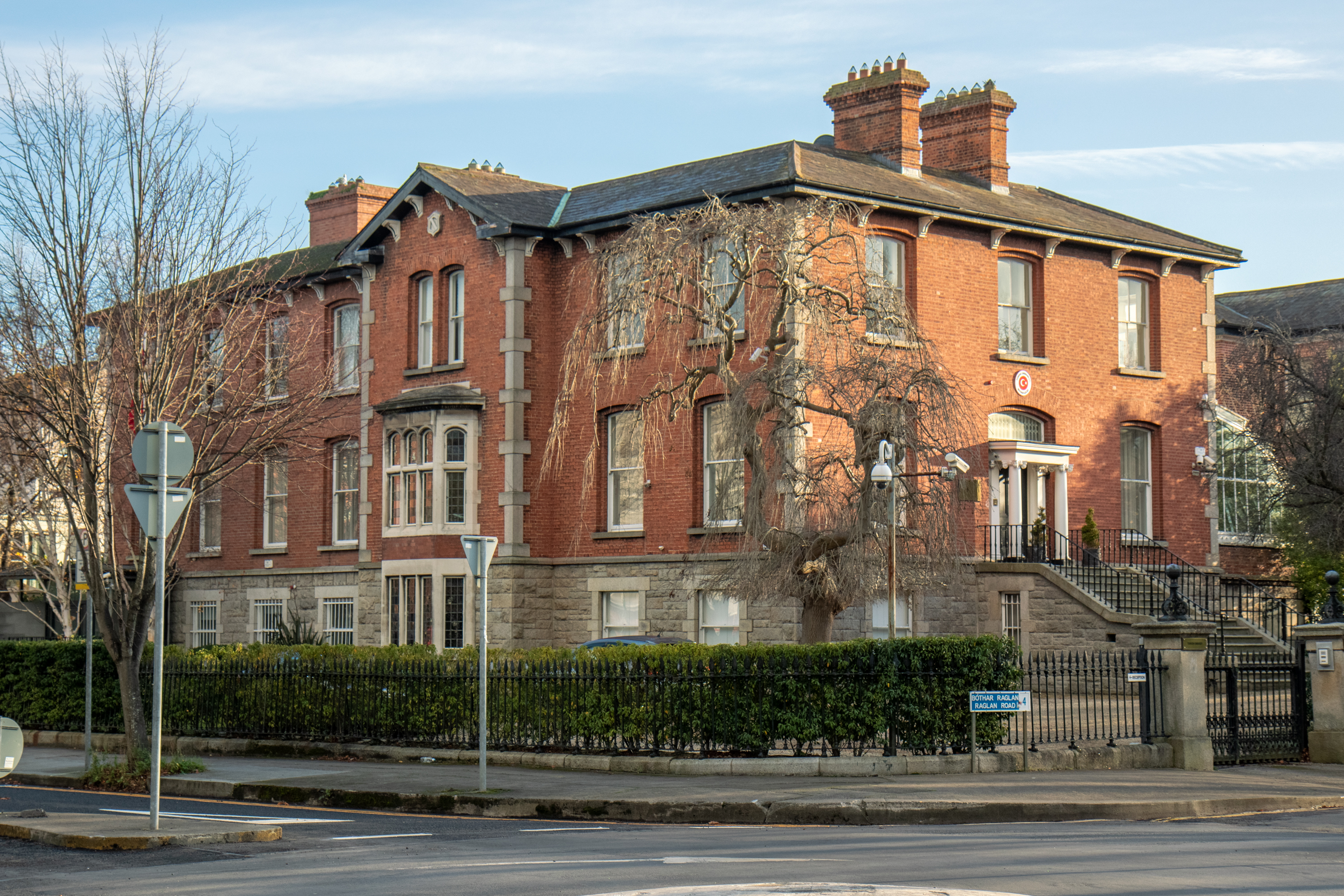
Embassy in Dublin

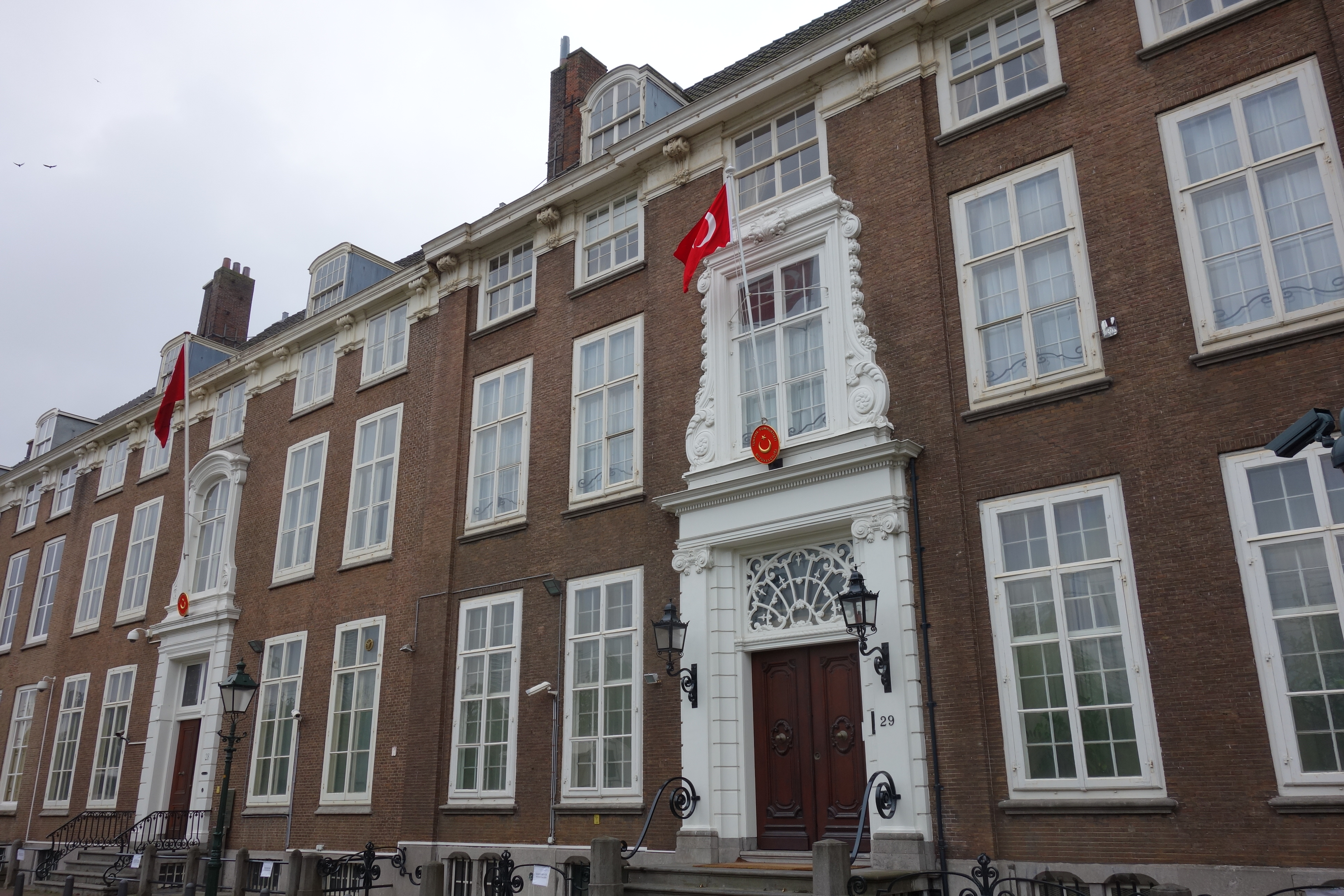
Embassy in The Hague

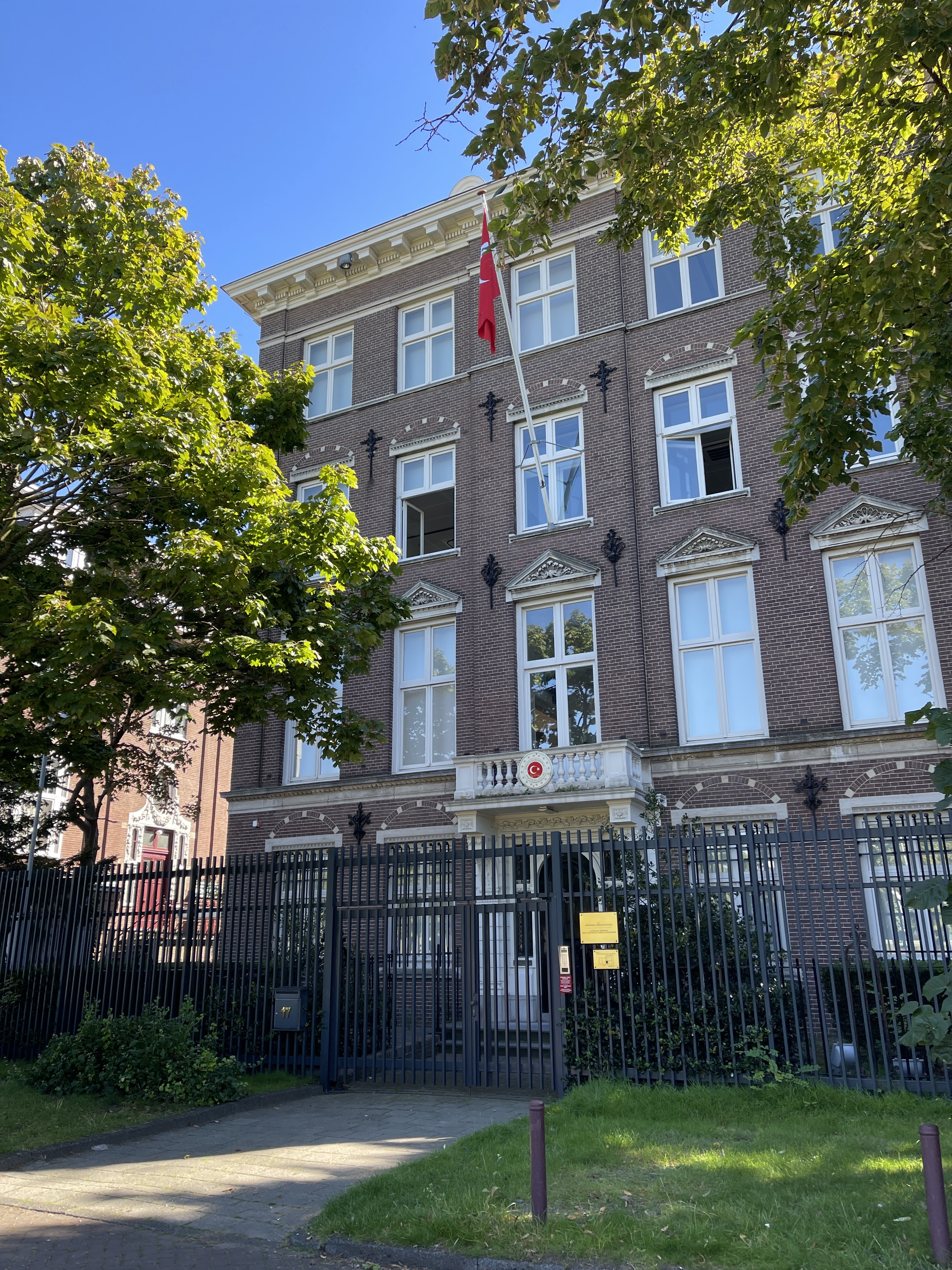
Consulate–General in Amsterdam

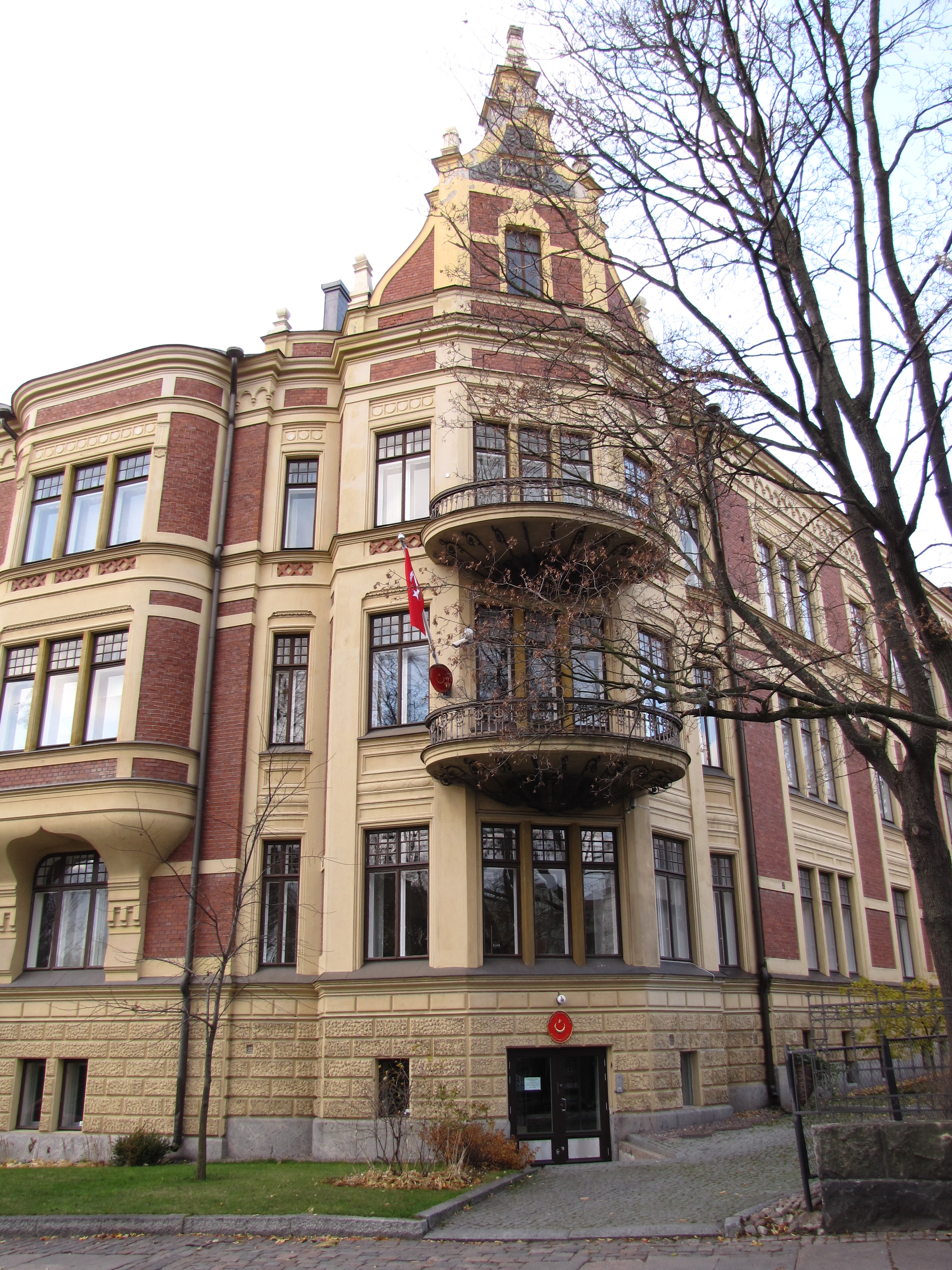
Embassy in Helsinki

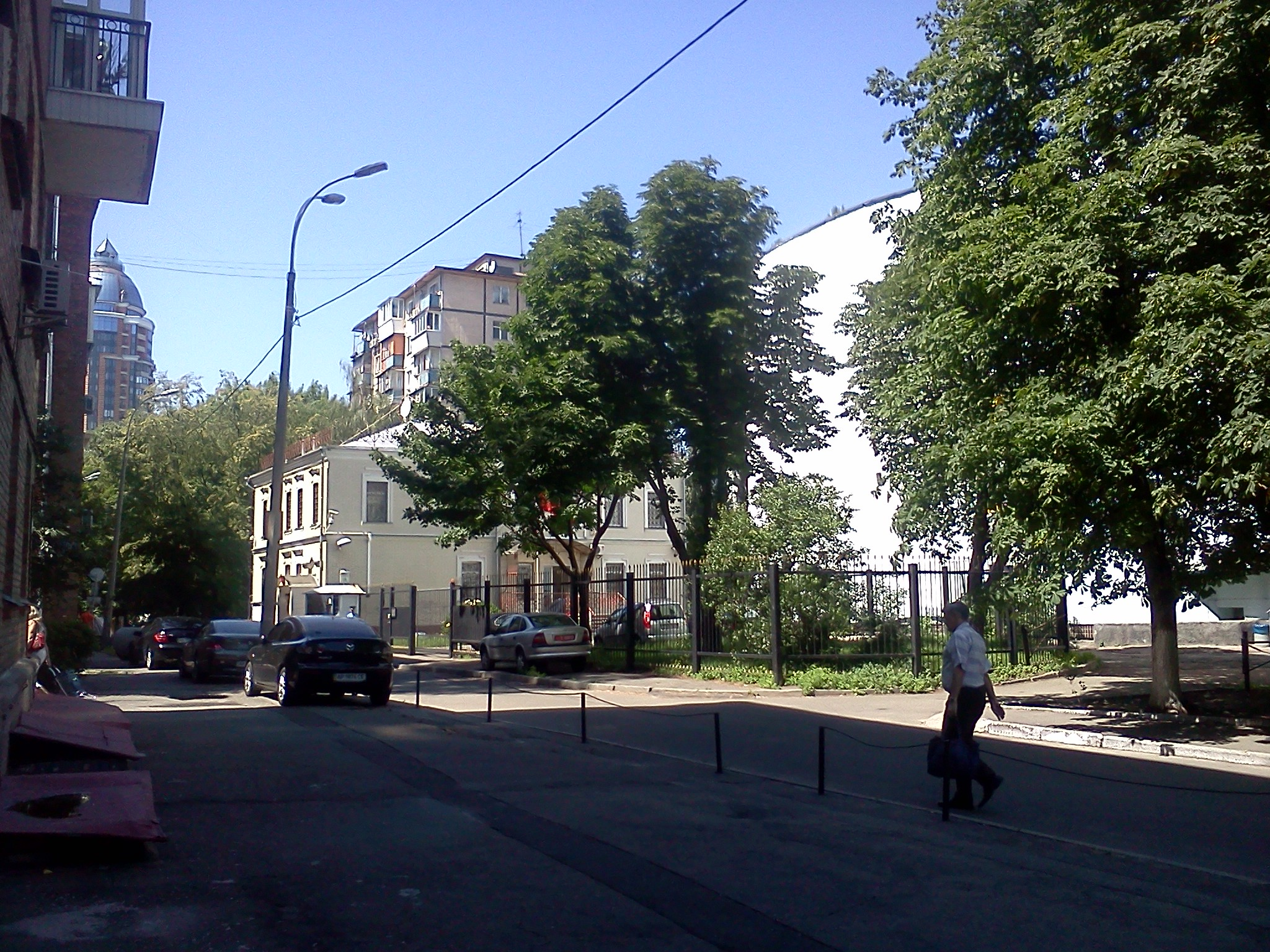
Embassy in Kyiv

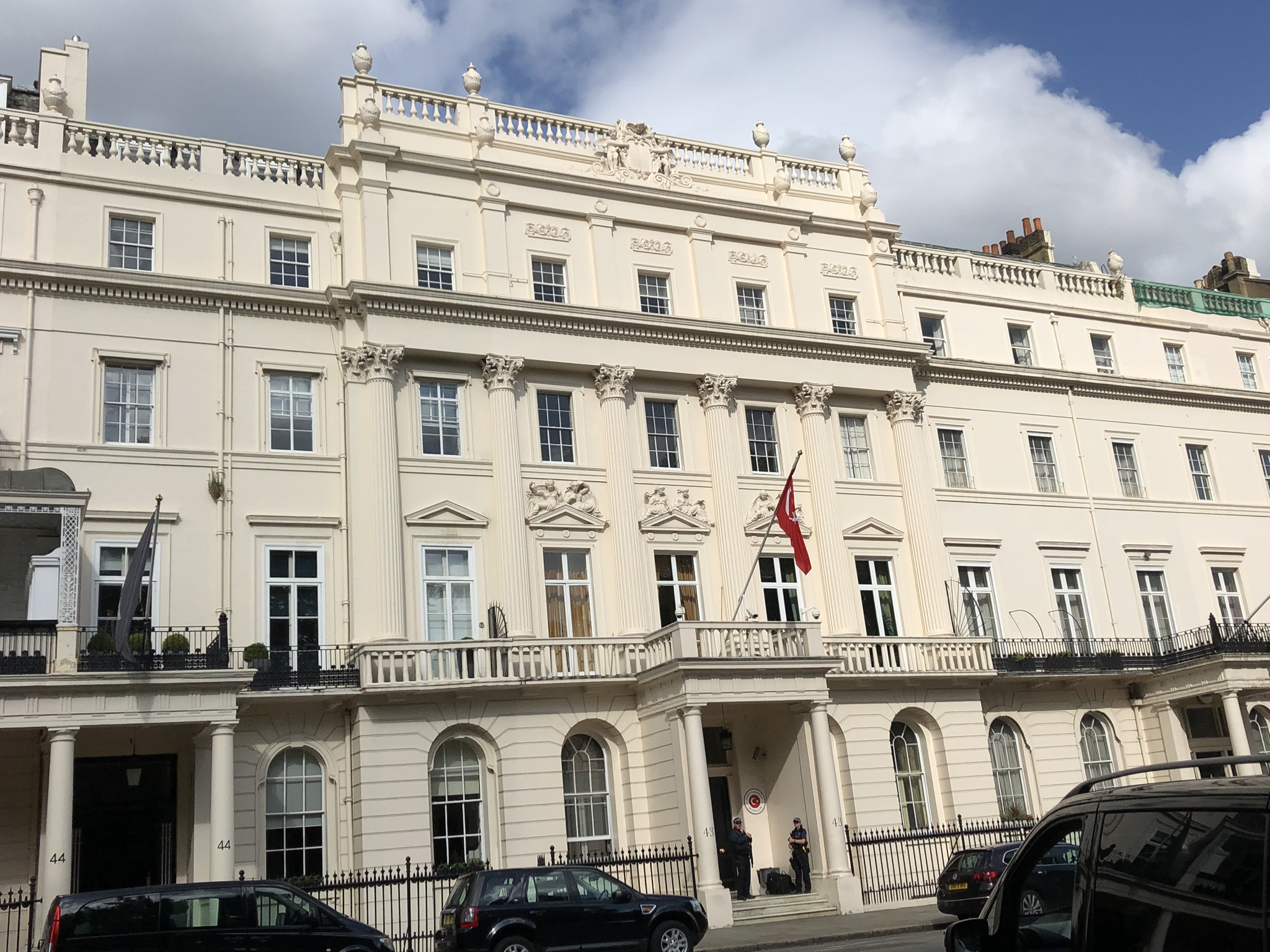
Embassy in London

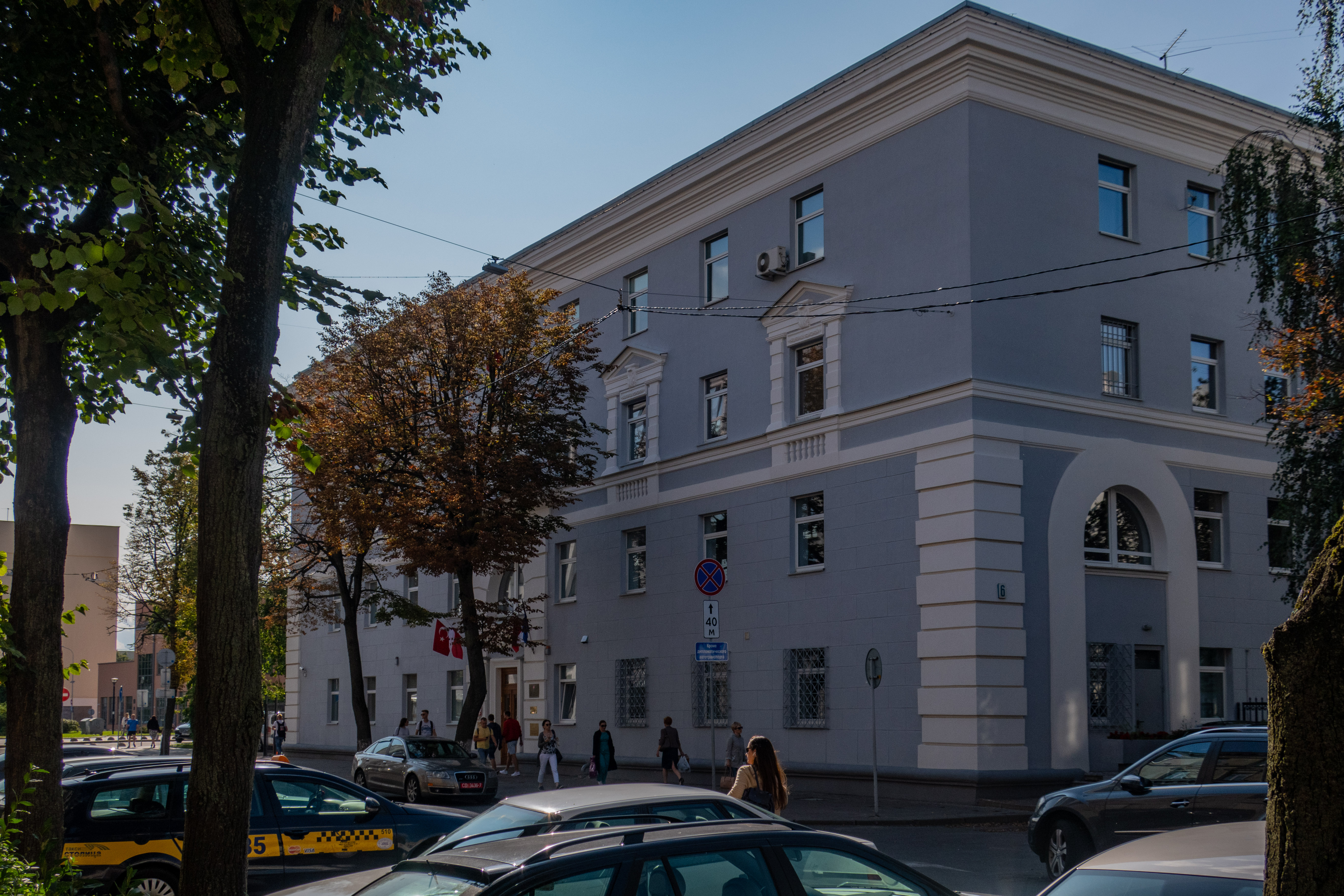
Embassy in Minsk

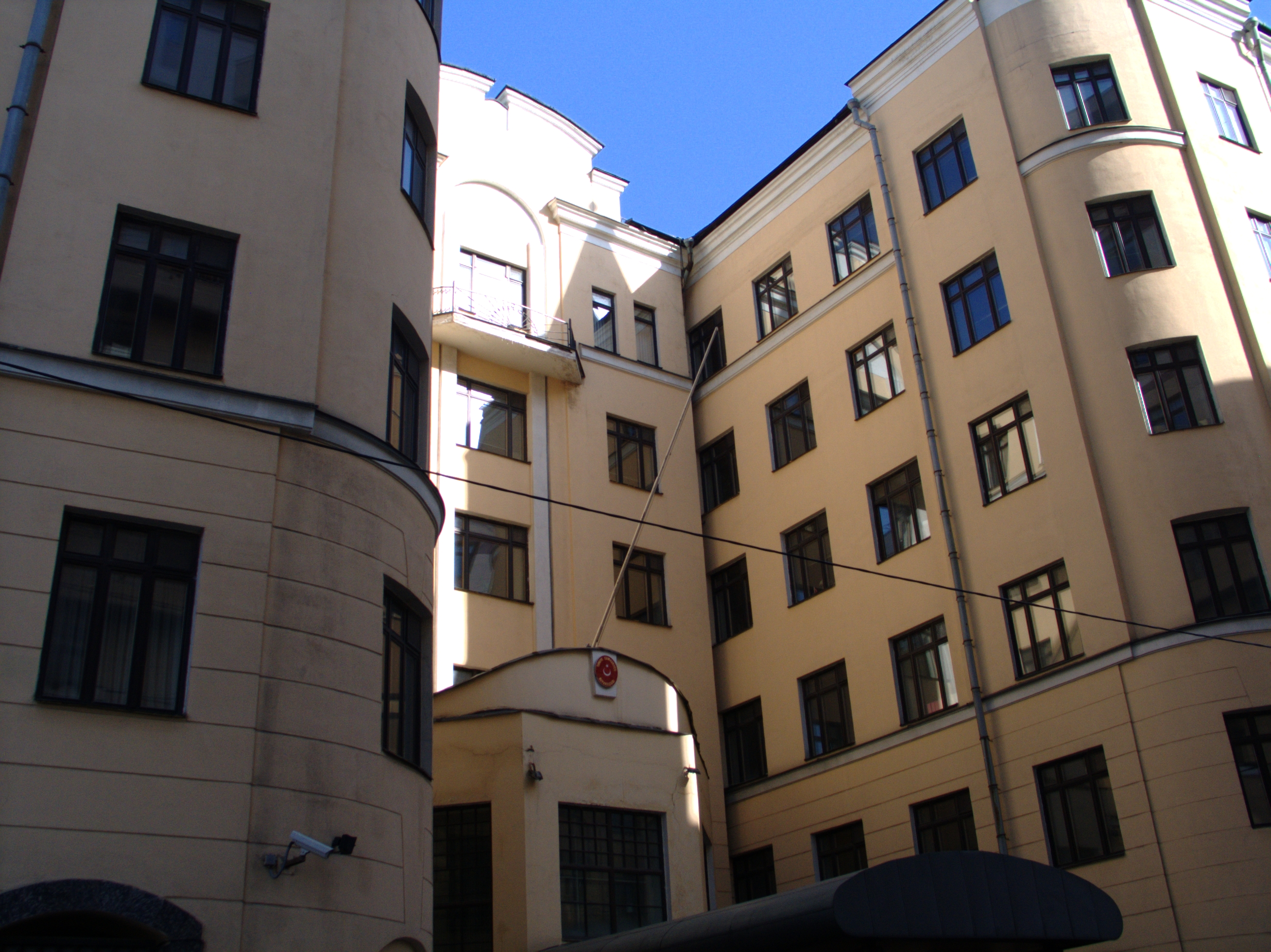
Embassy in Moscow

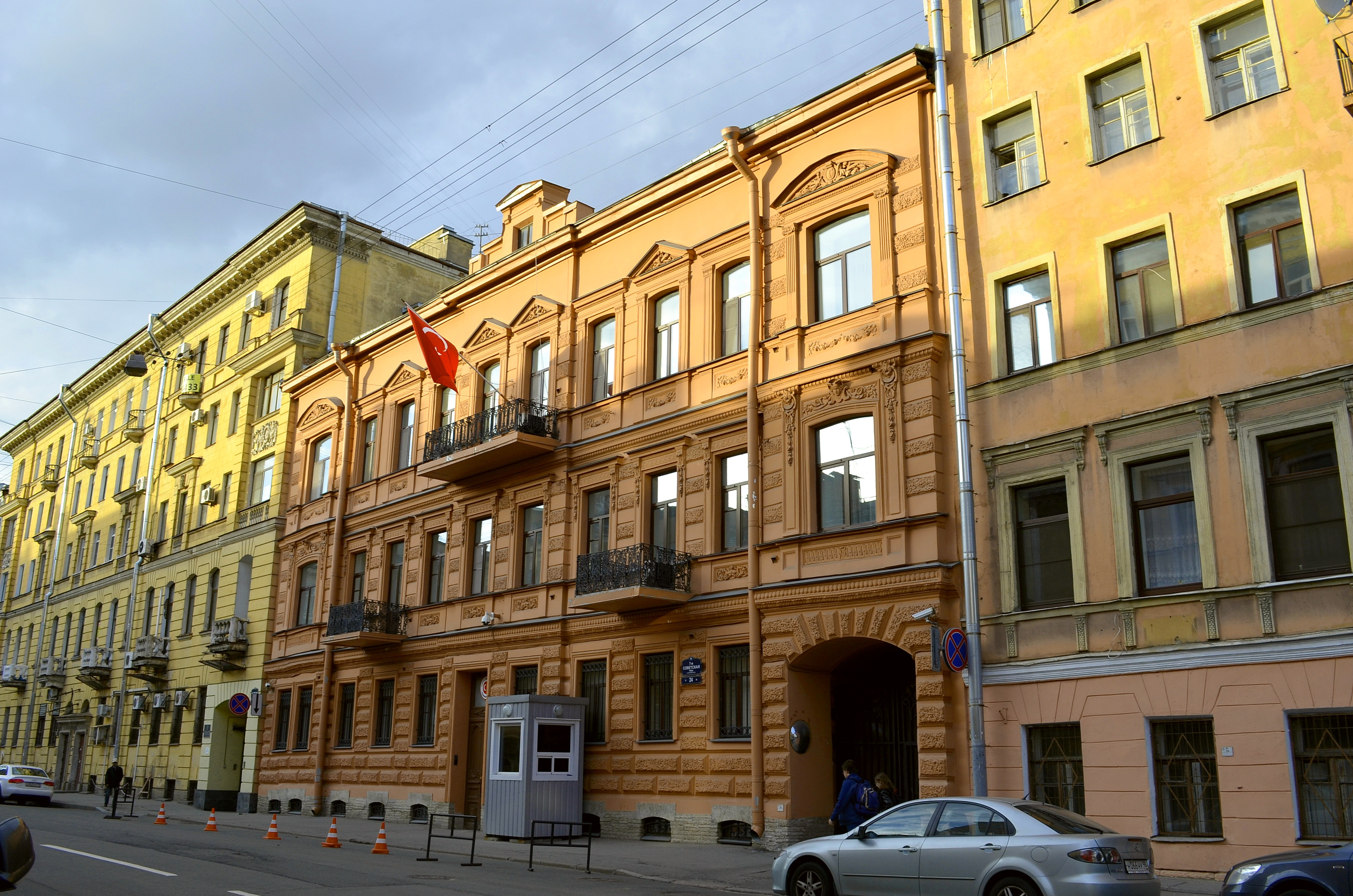
Consulate–General in Saint Petersburg

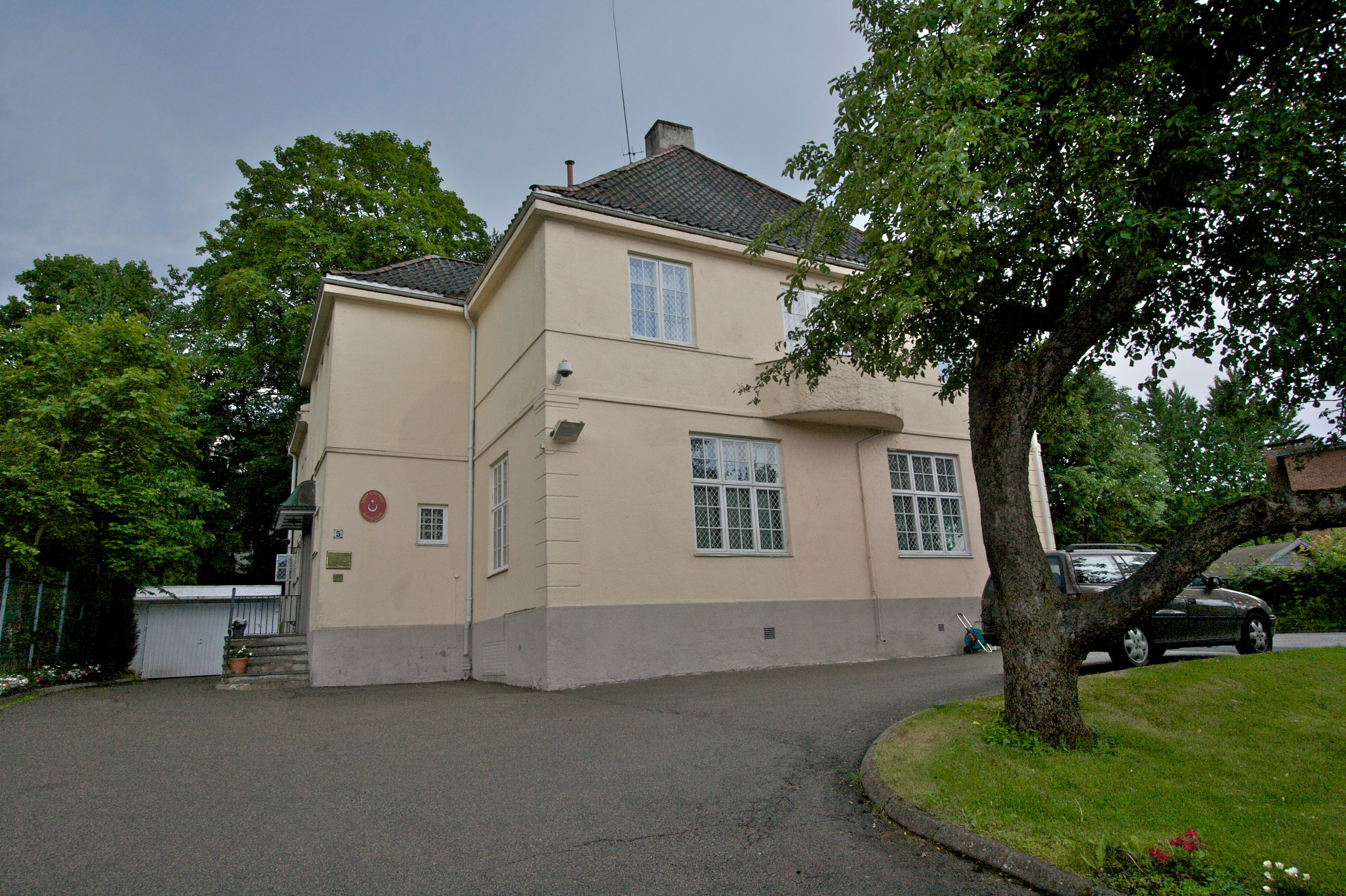
Embassy in Oslo

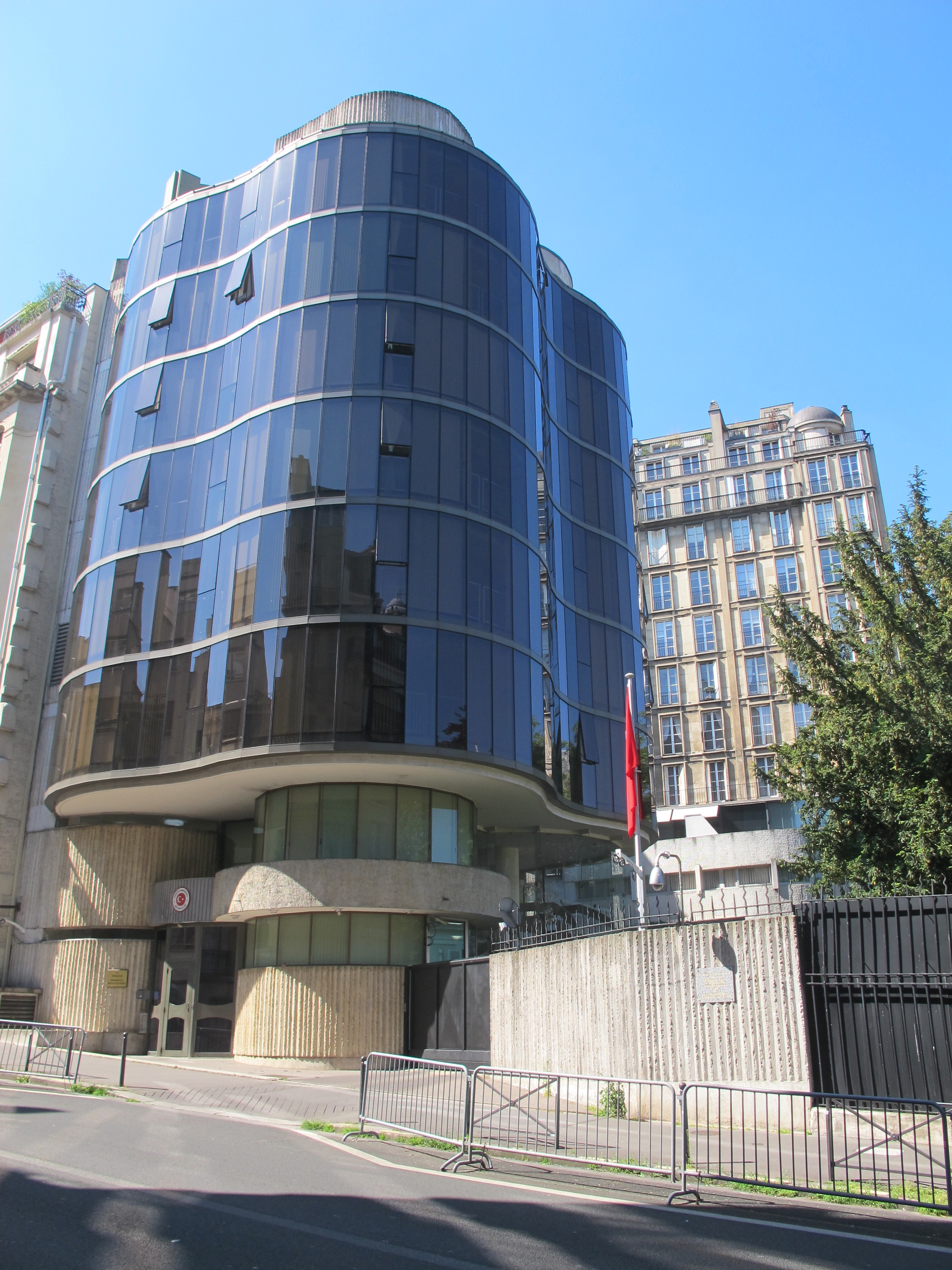
Embassy in Paris

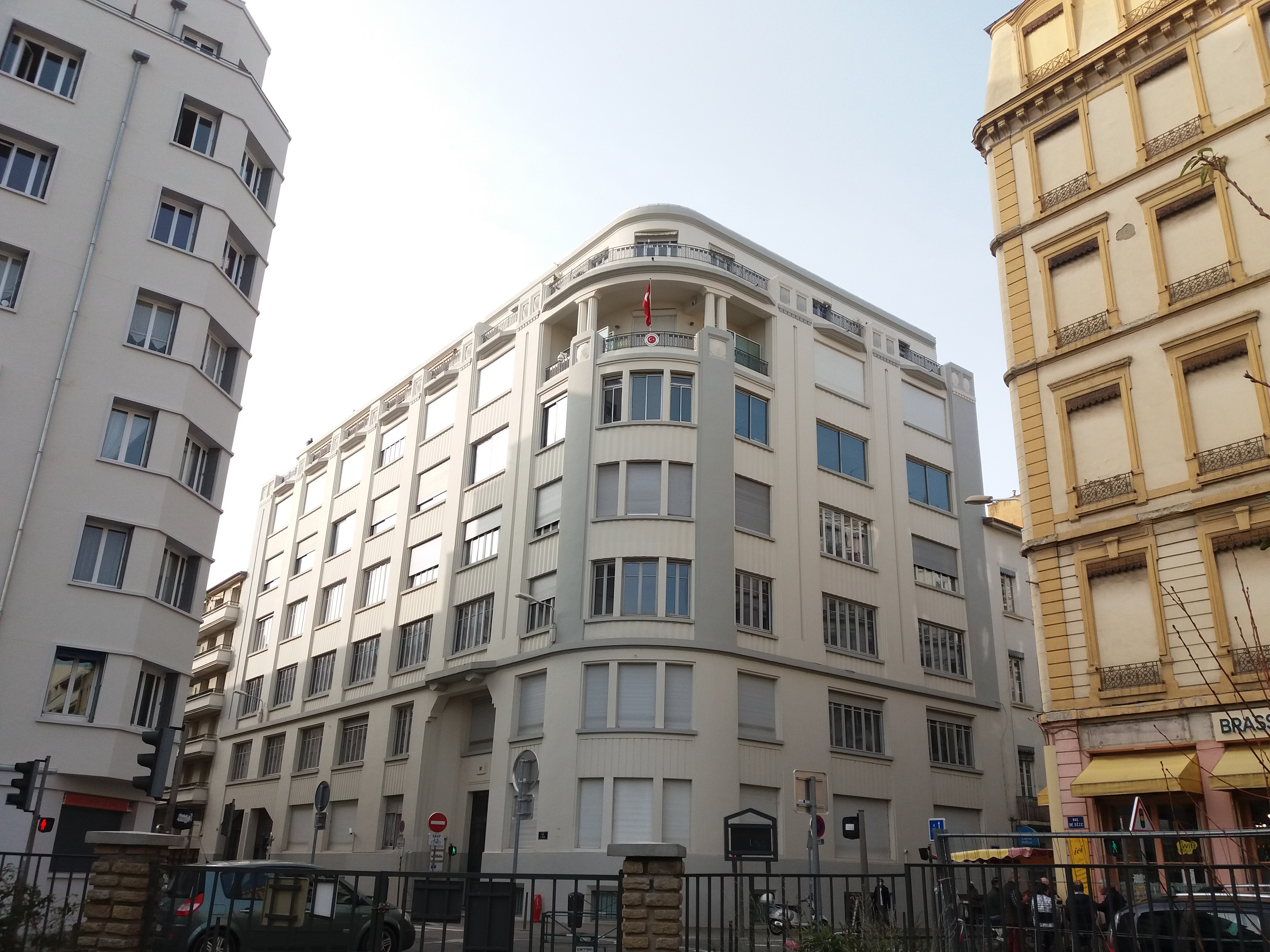
Consulate–General in Lyon

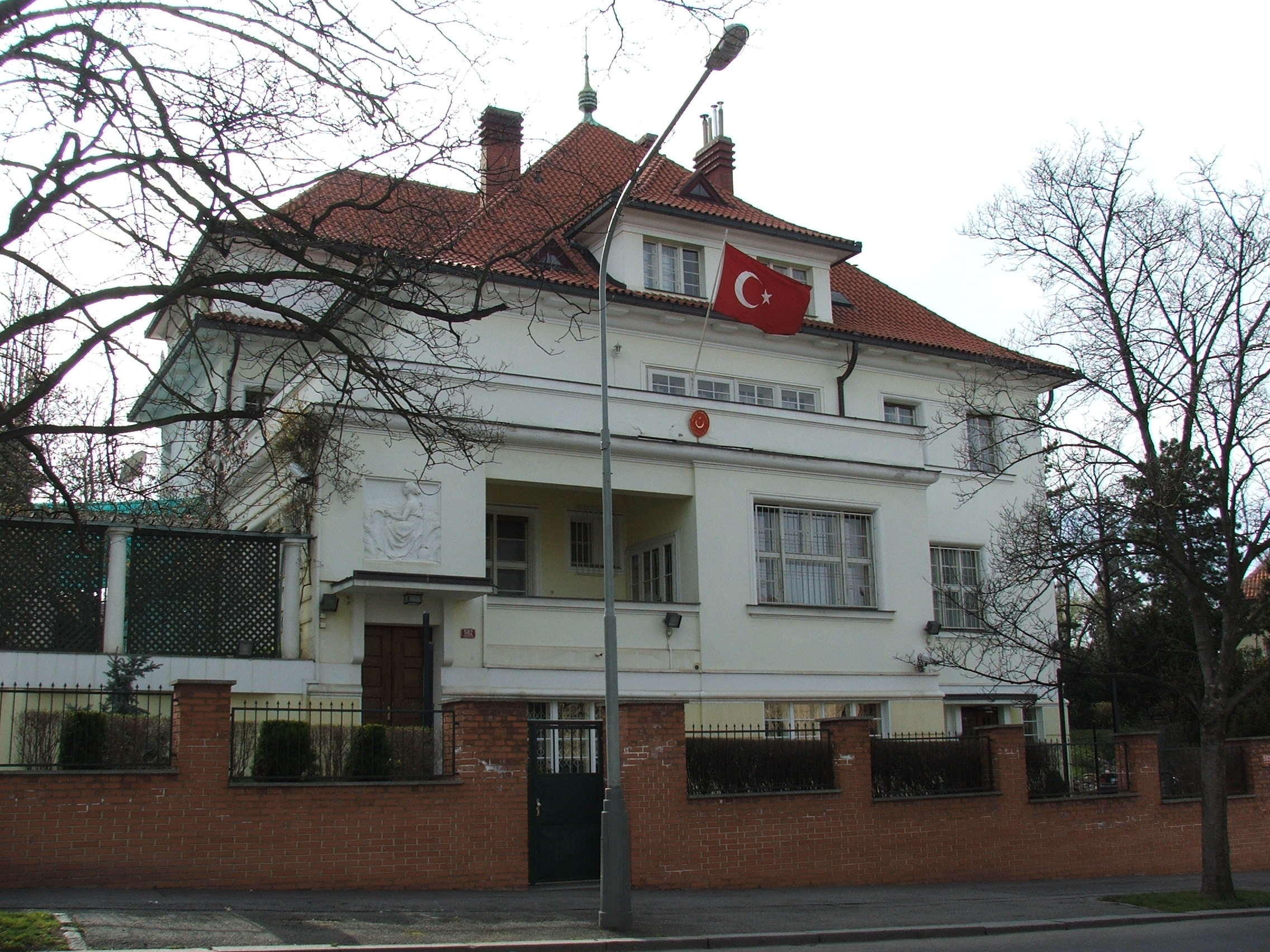
Embassy in Prague

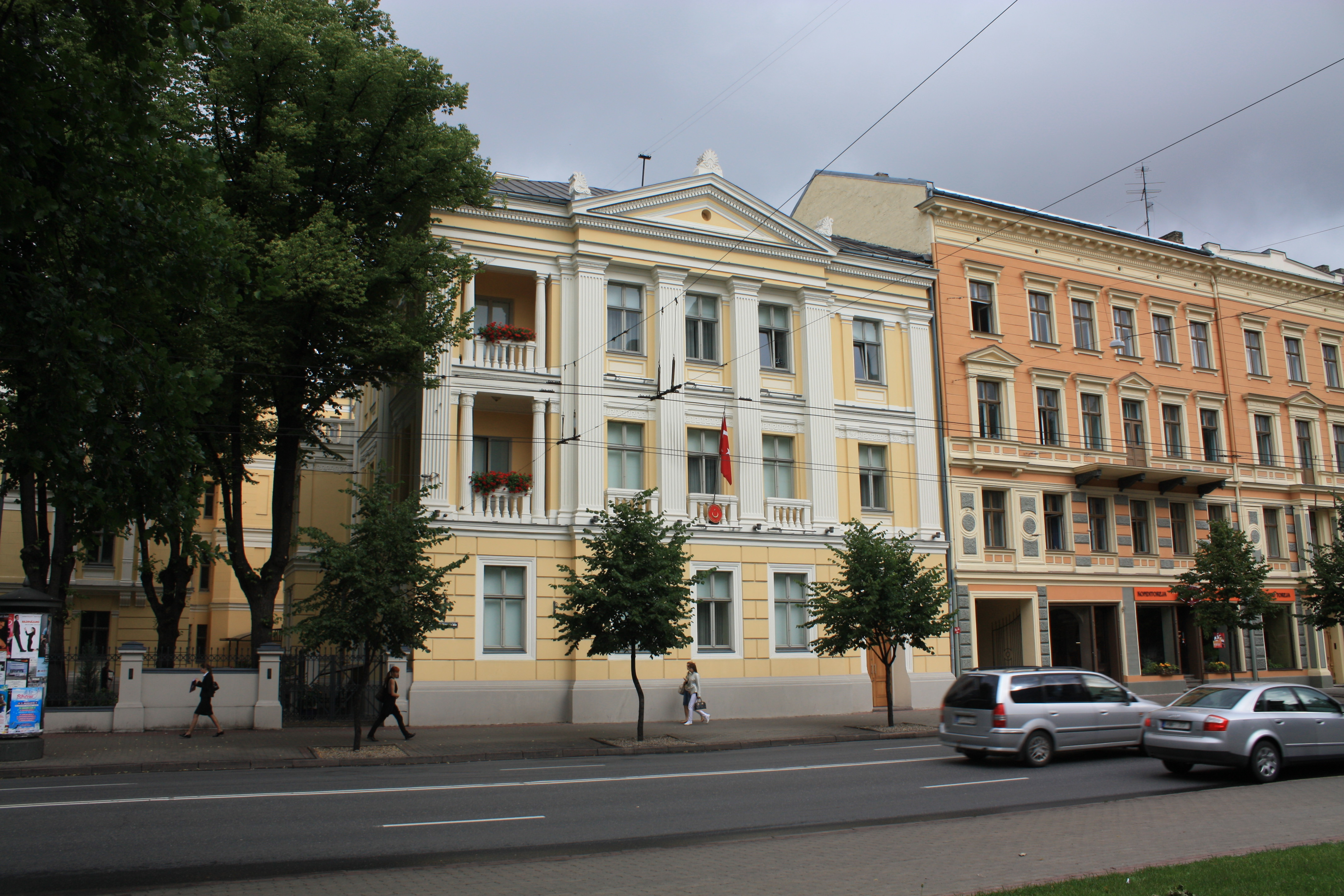
Embassy in Riga

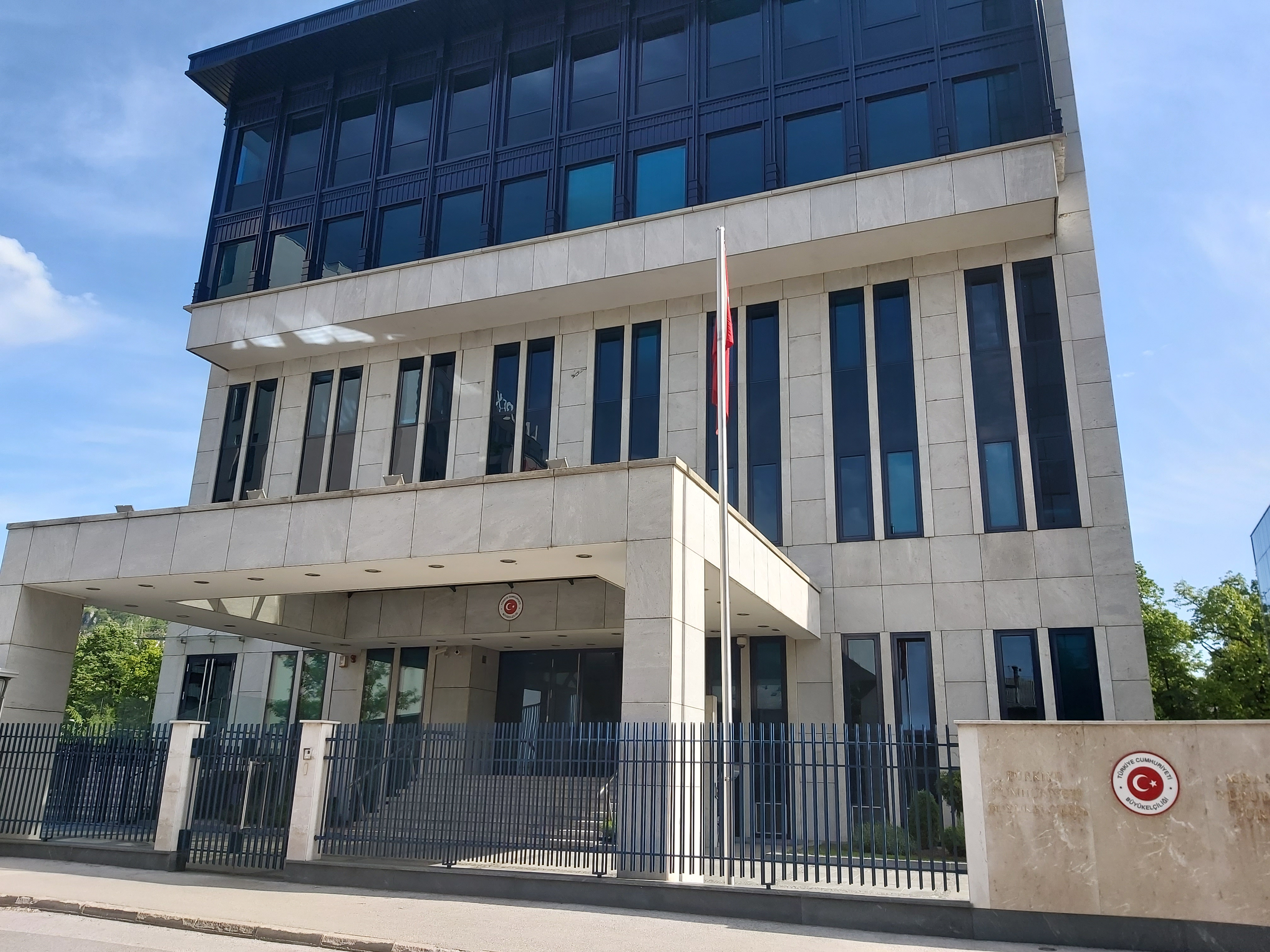
Embassy in Sarajevo

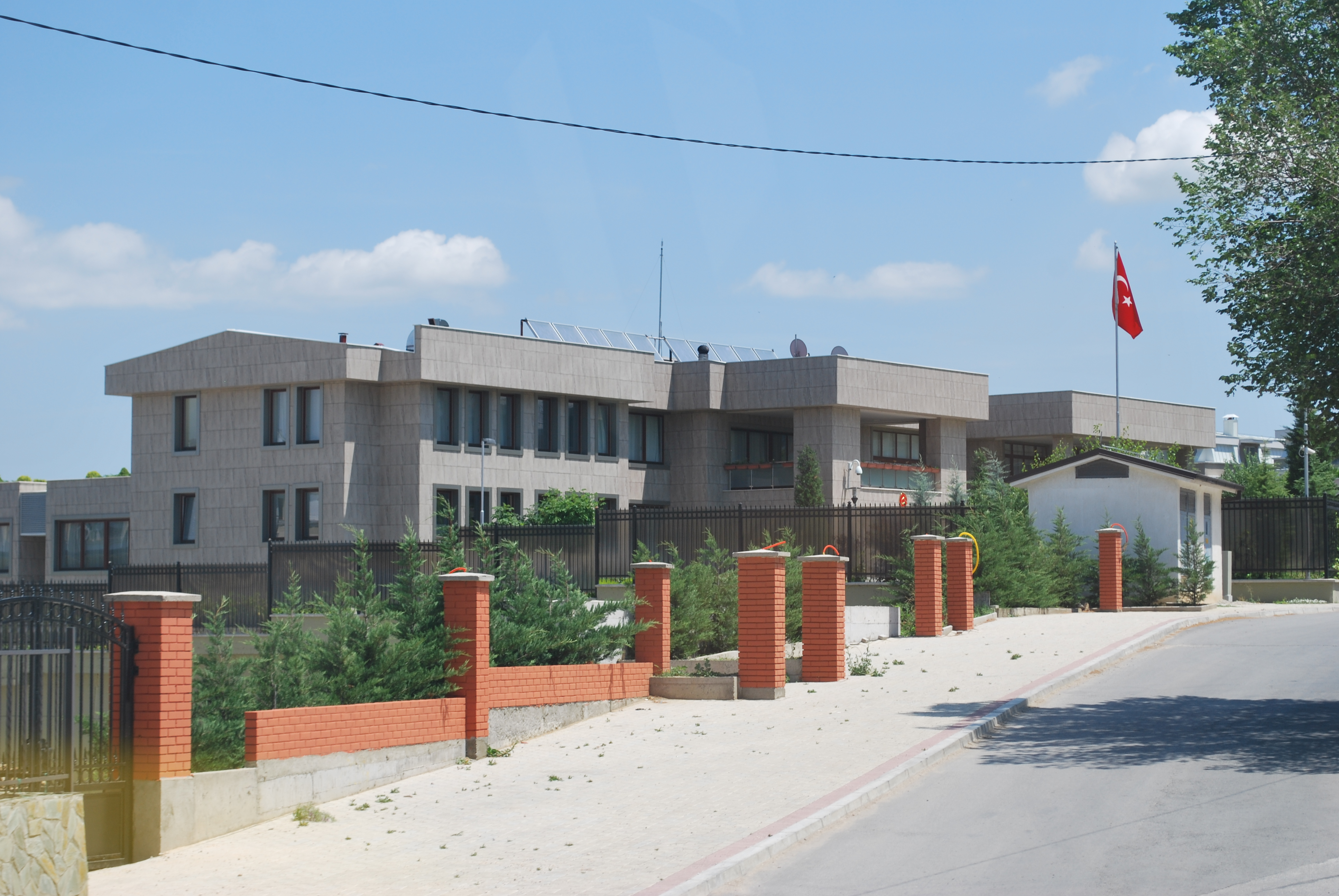
Embassy in Skopje

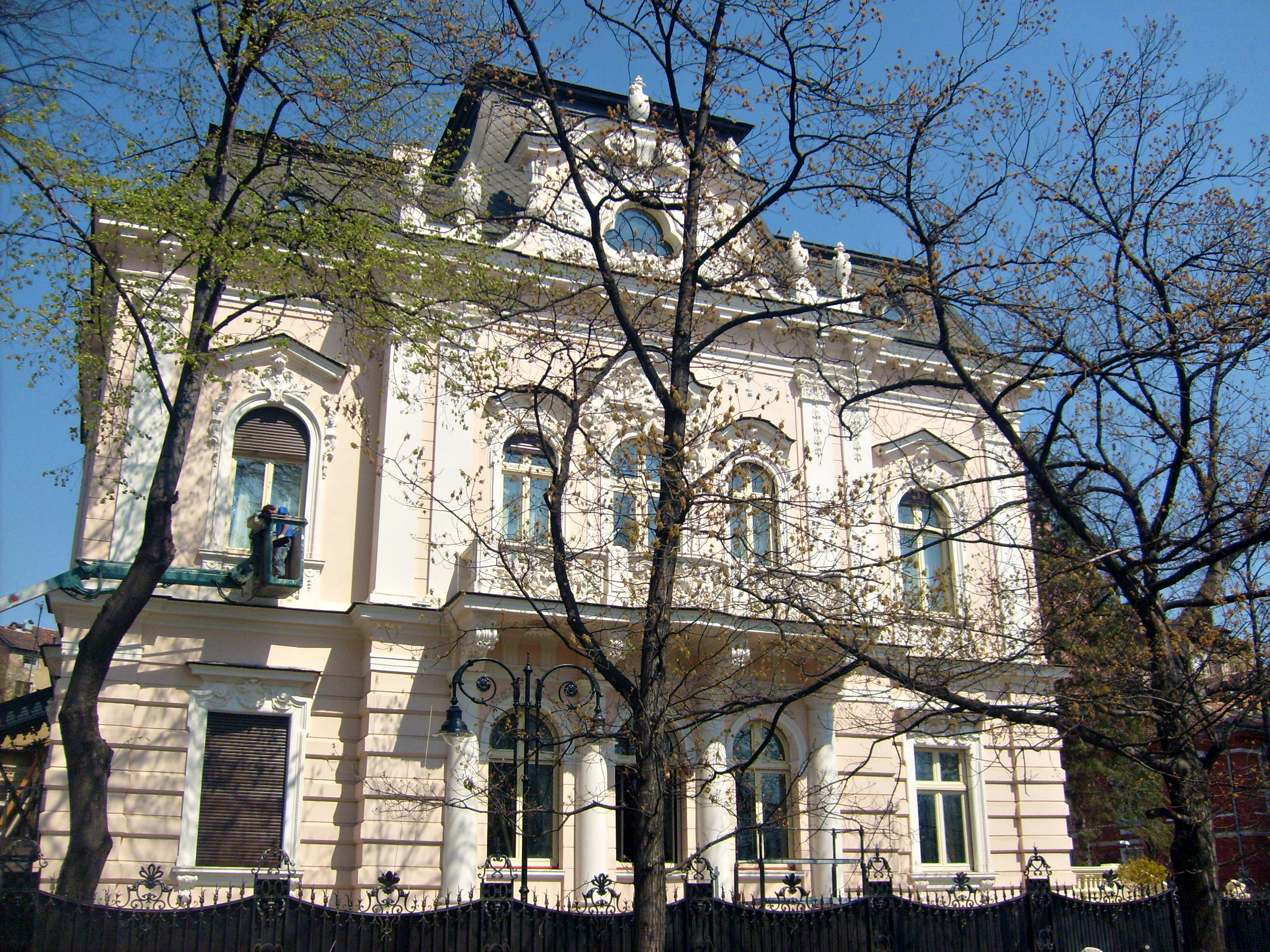
Embassy in Sofia

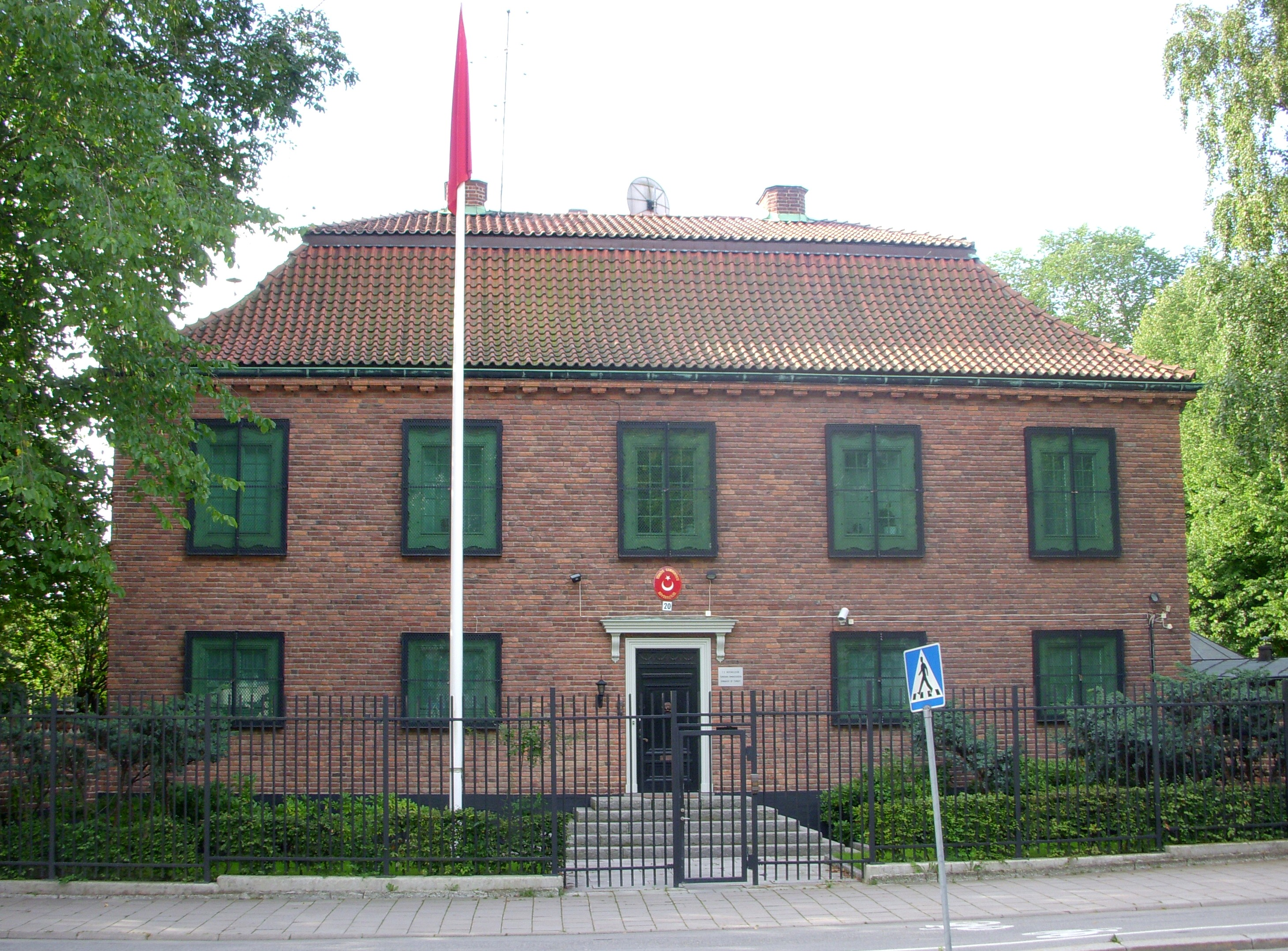
Embassy in Stockholm

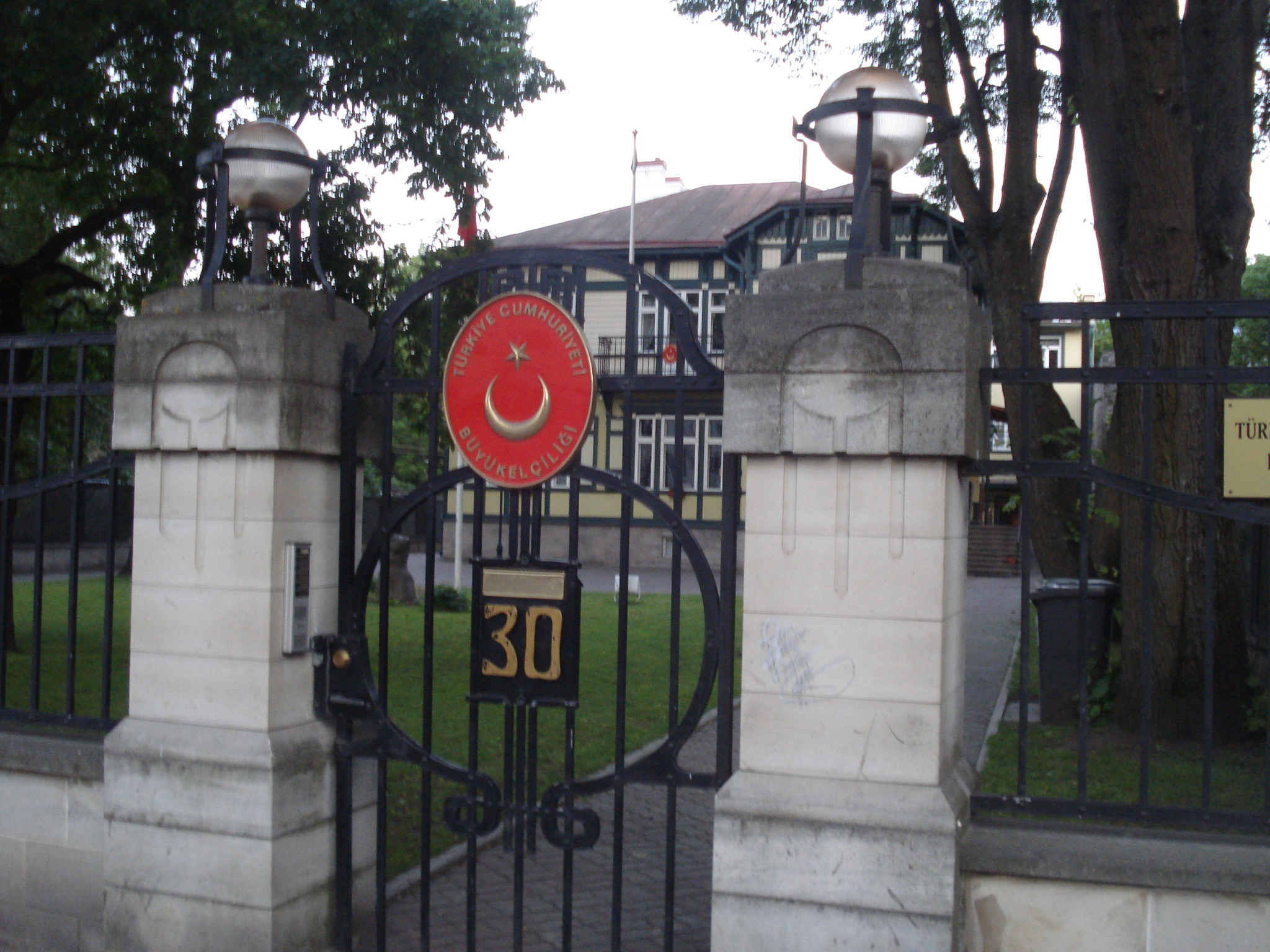
Embassy in Tallinn

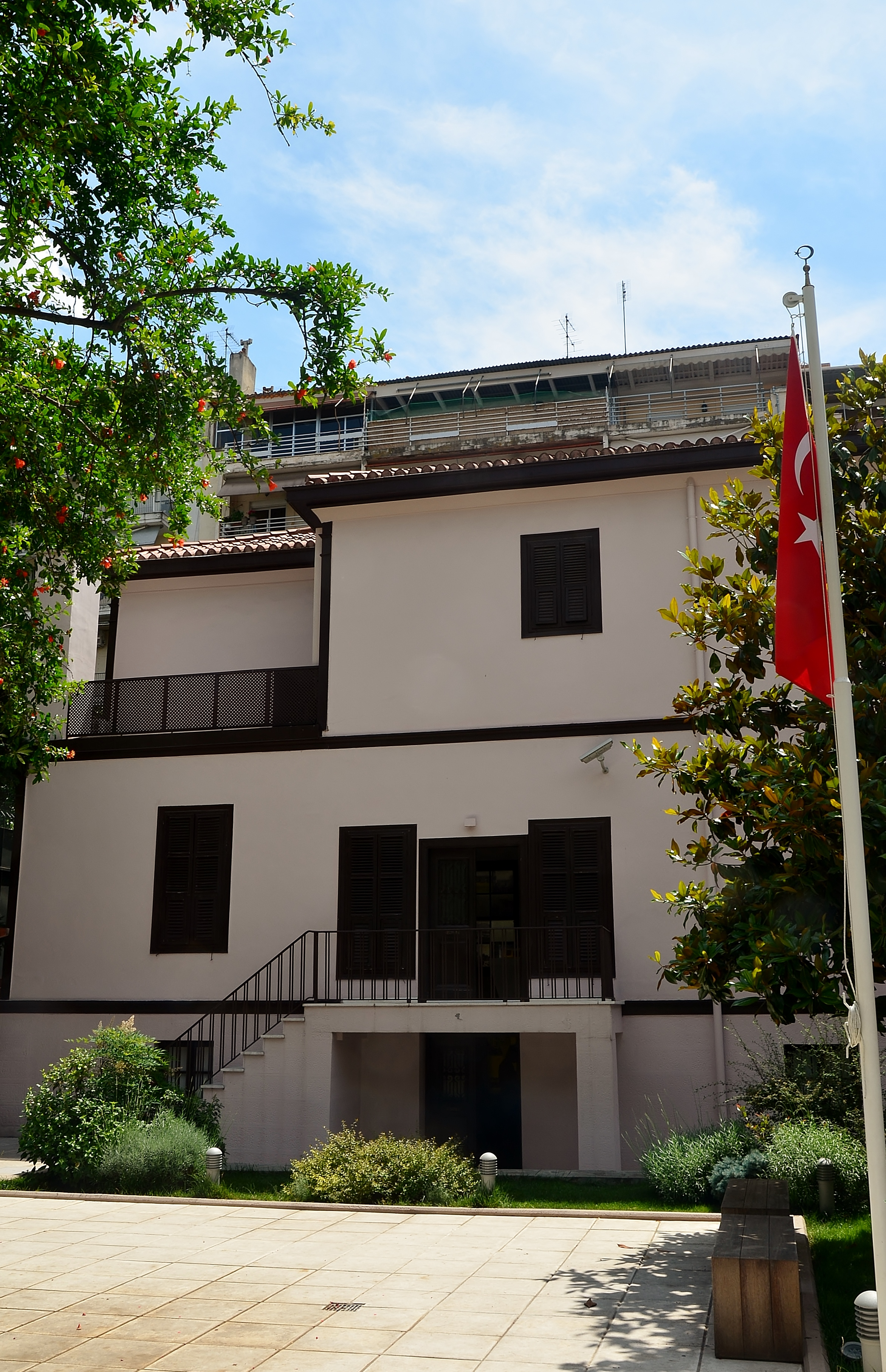
Consulate–General in Thessaloniki

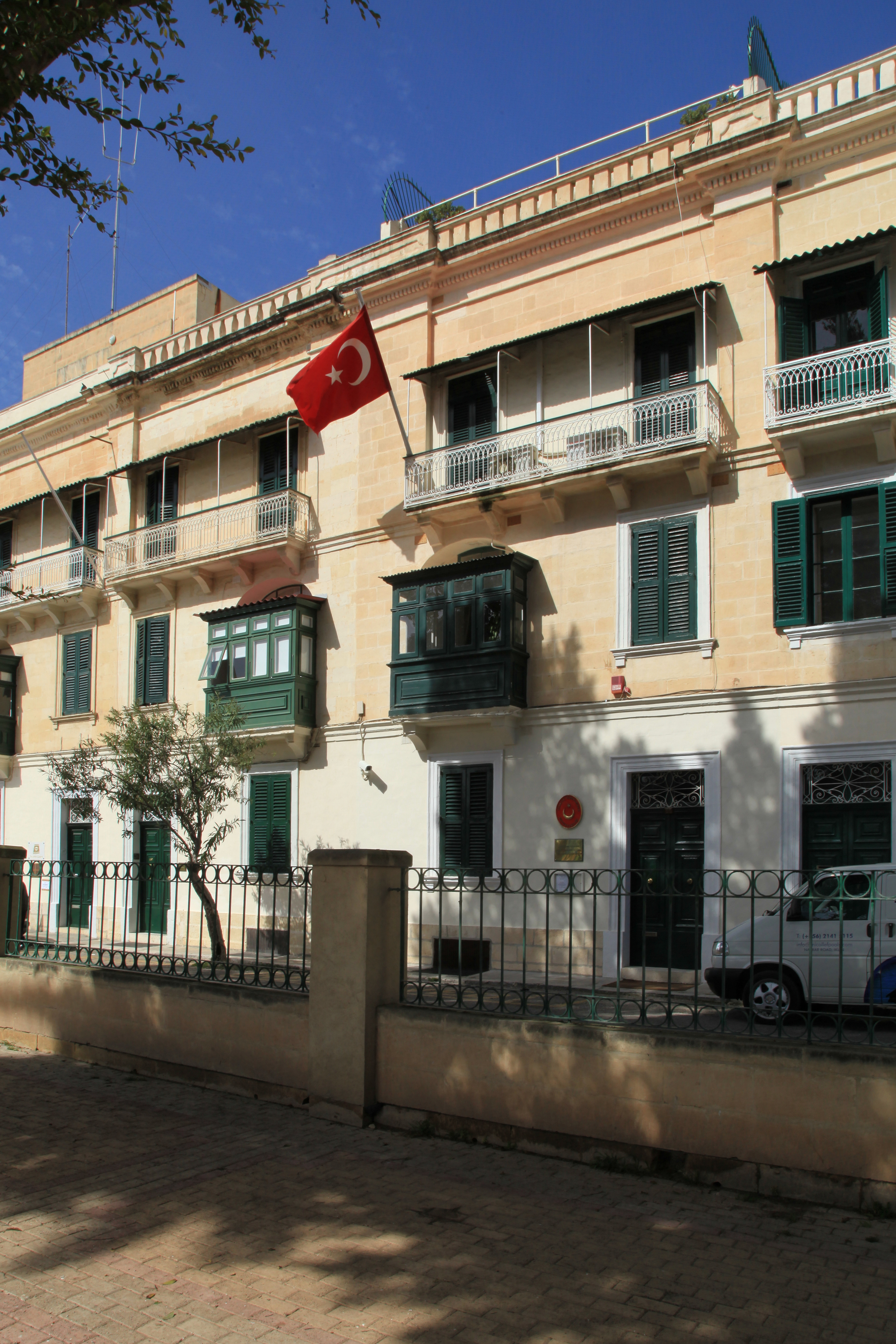
Embassy in Valletta

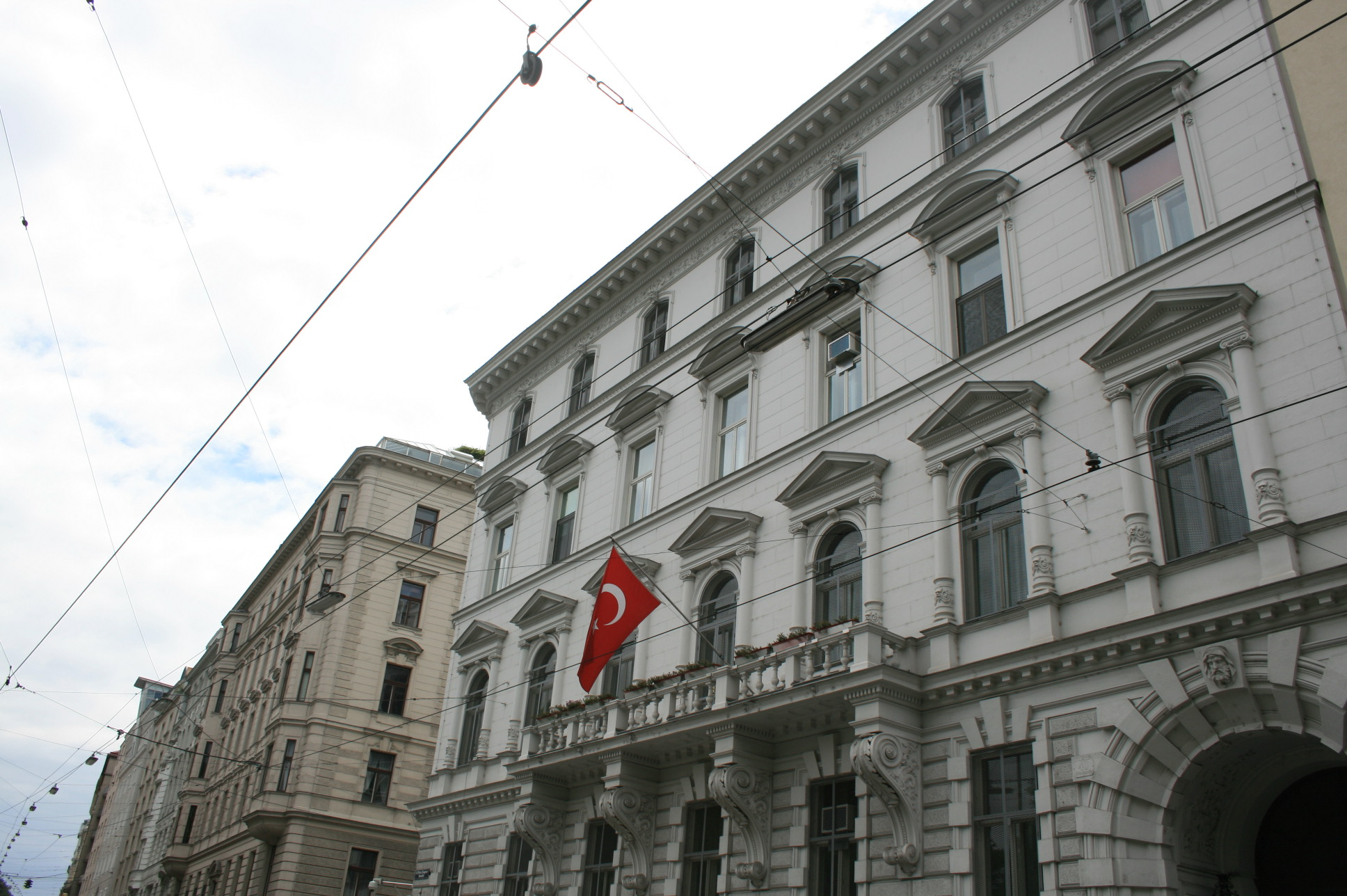
Embassy in Vienna

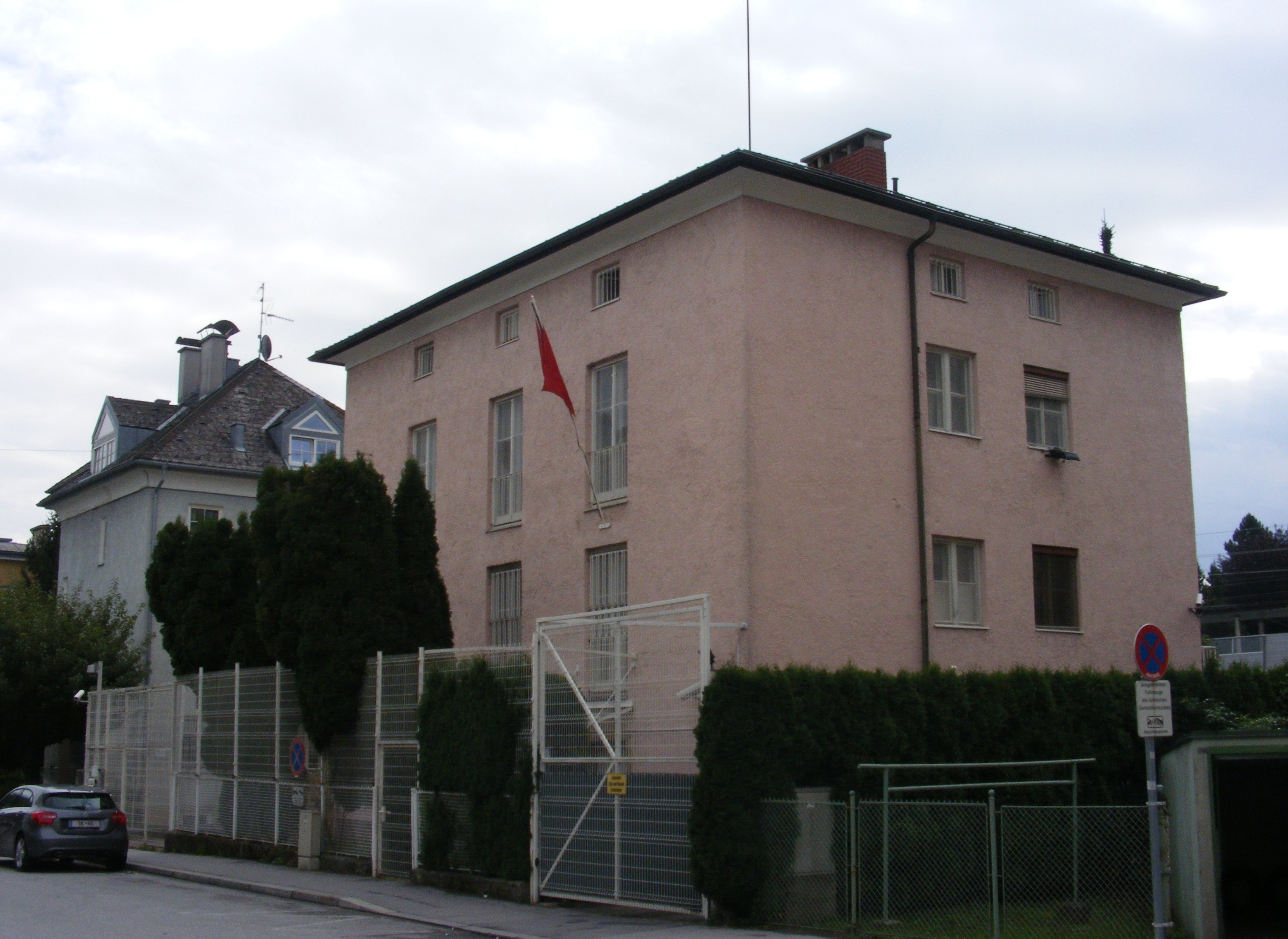
Consulate–General in Salzburg

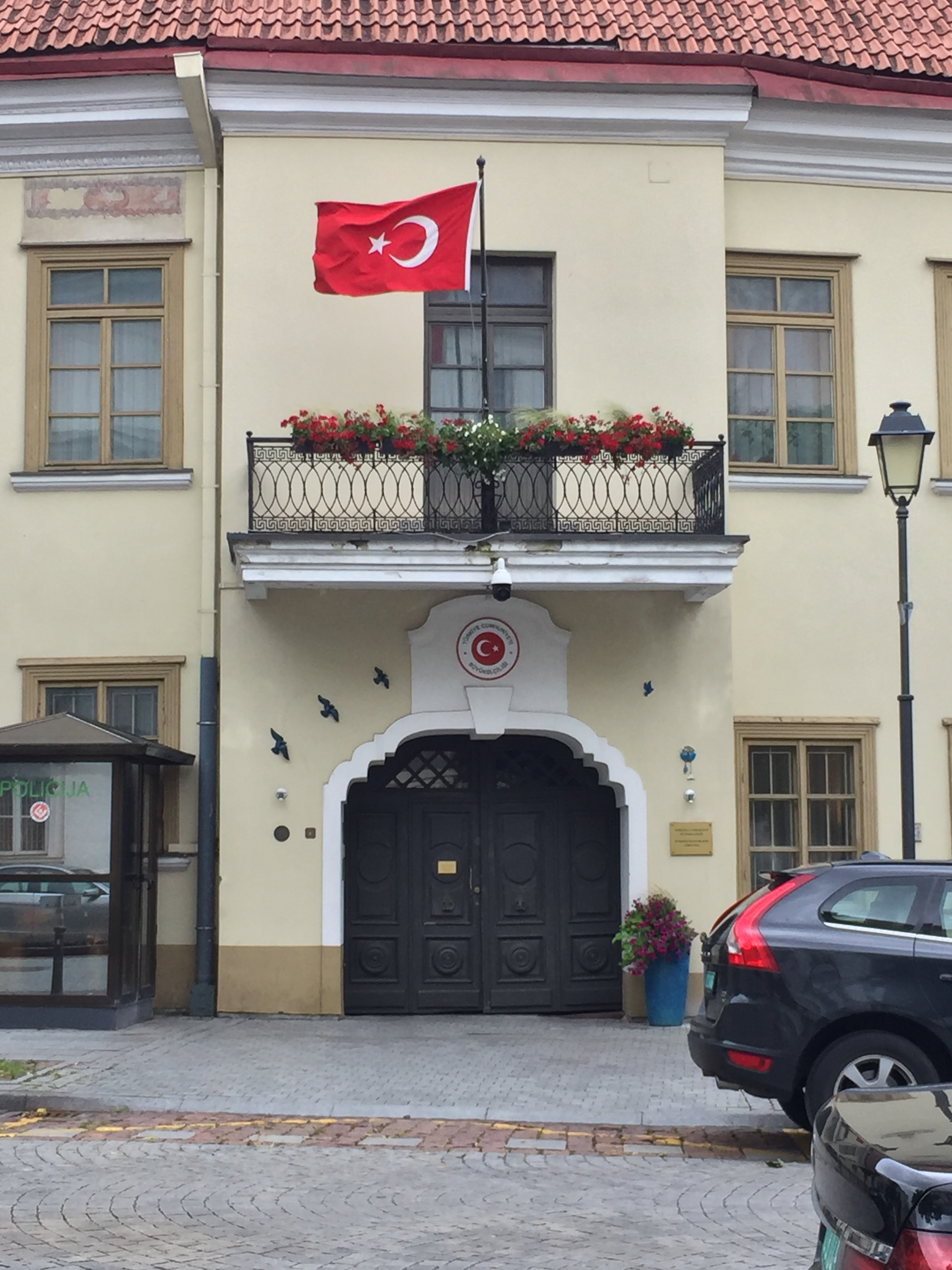
Embassy in Vilnius

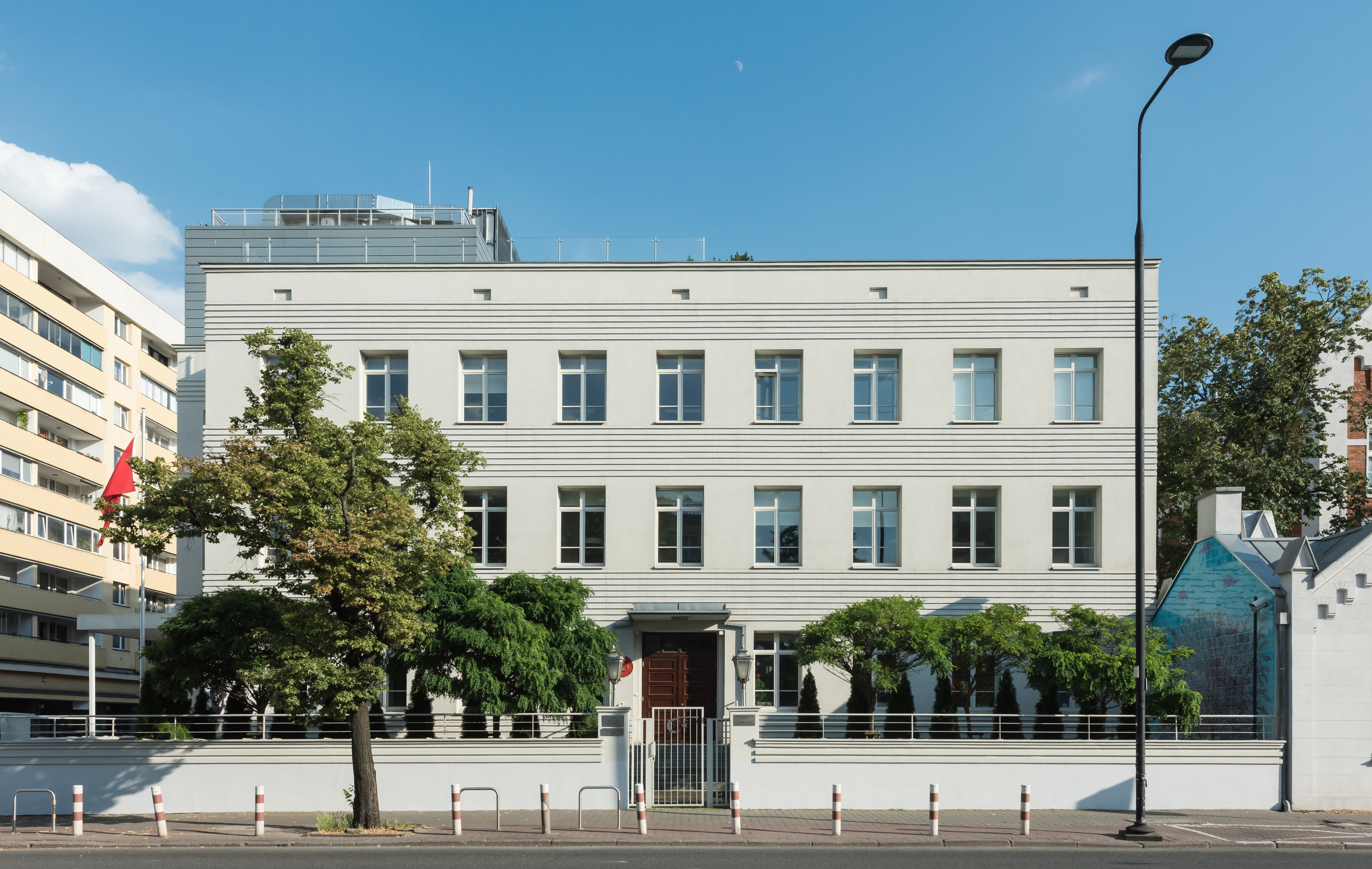
Embassy in Warsaw

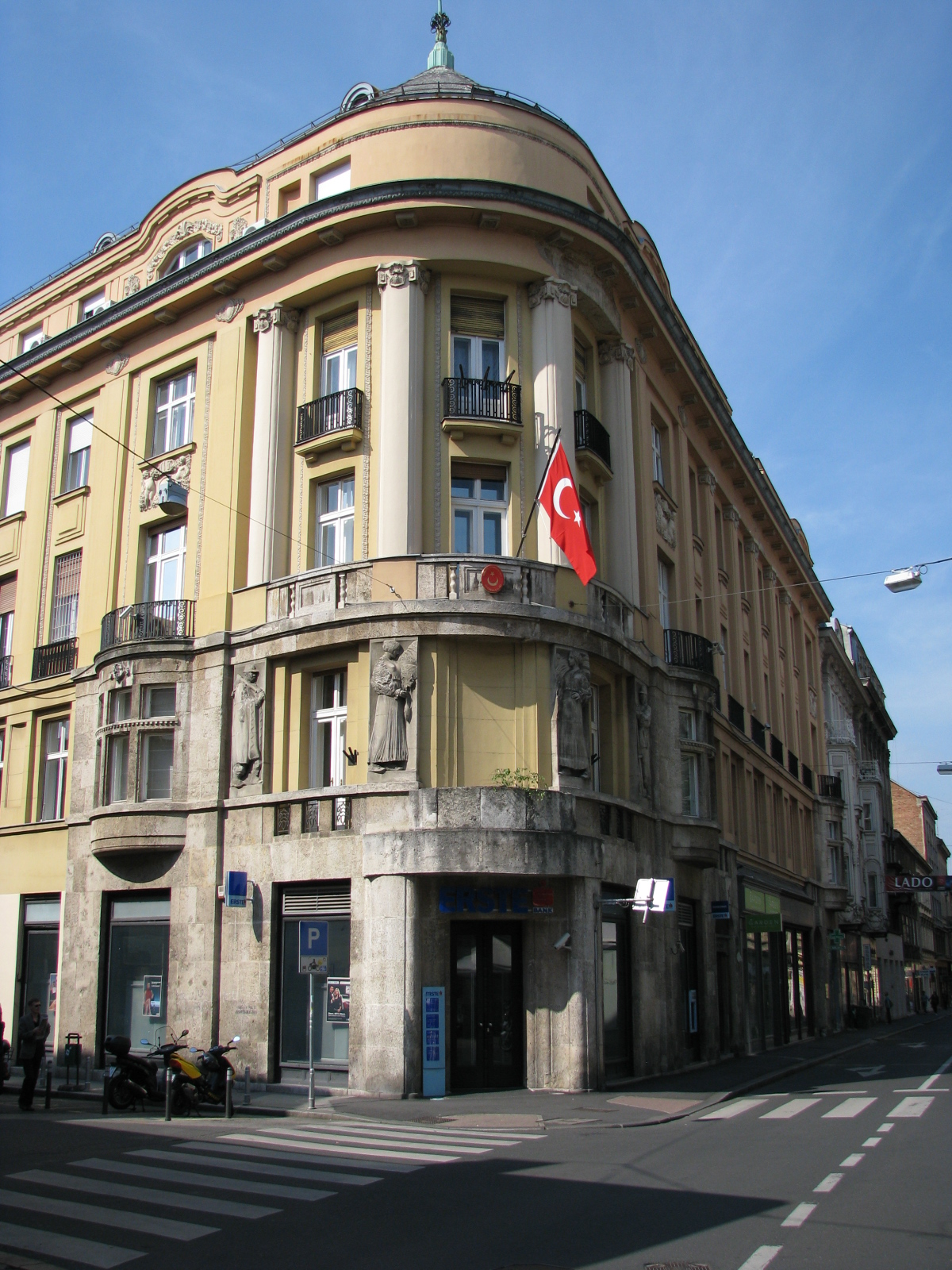
Embassy in Zagreb

== Oceania ==
Host country	Host city	Mission	Concurrent accreditation	Ref.
Australia	Canberra	Embassy	Countries: Kiribati; Marshall Islands; Nauru; Solomon Islands; Vanuatu	
Australia	Melbourne	Consulate–General	Countries: Kiribati; Marshall Islands; Nauru; Solomon Islands; Vanuatu	
Australia	Sydney	Consulate–General	Countries: Kiribati; Marshall Islands; Nauru; Solomon Islands; Vanuatu	
New Zealand	Wellington	Embassy	Countries: Cook Islands; Fiji; Niue; Samoa; Tonga; Tuvalu	
Papua New Guinea	Port Moresby	Embassy		

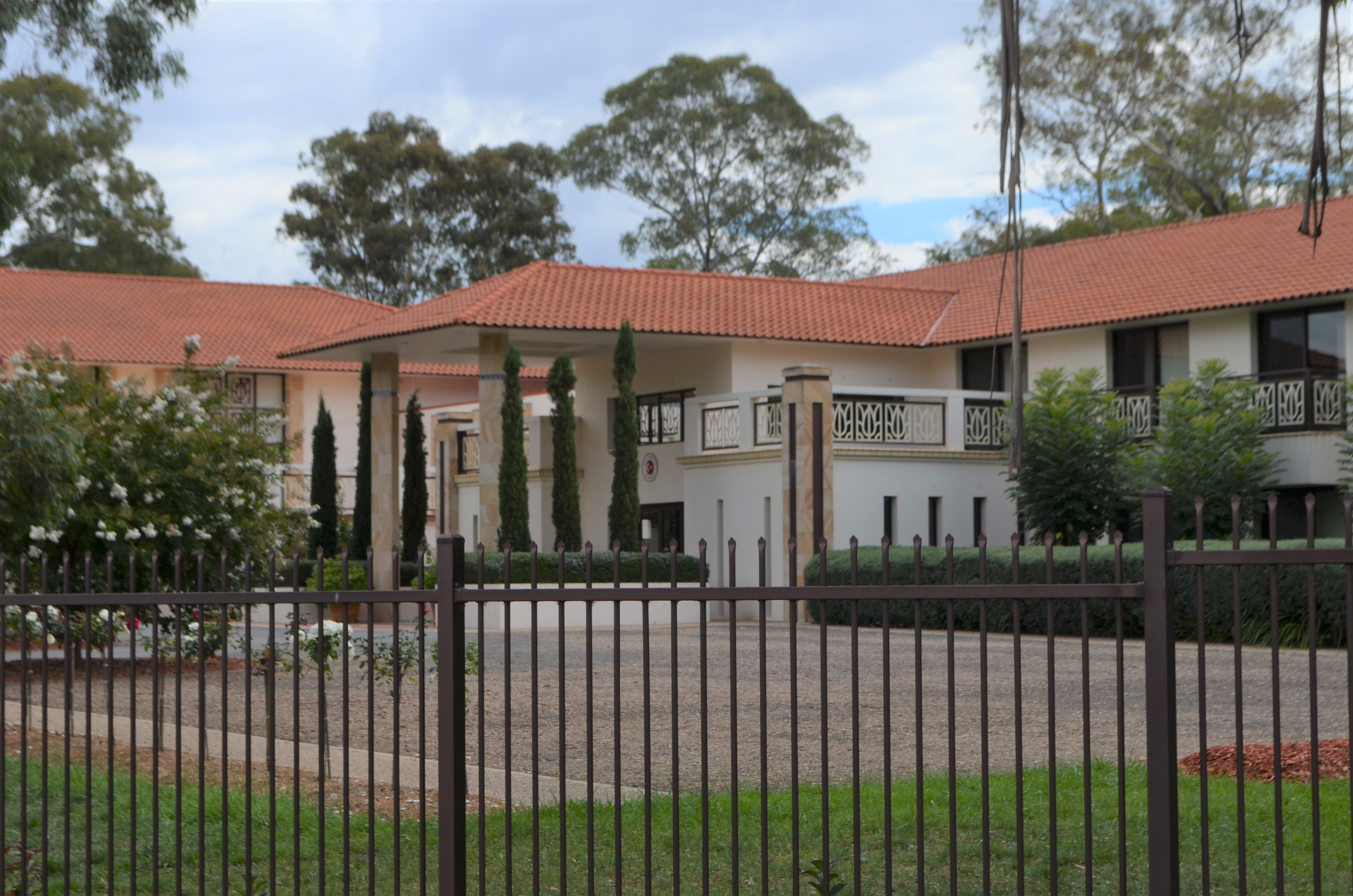
Embassy in Canberra

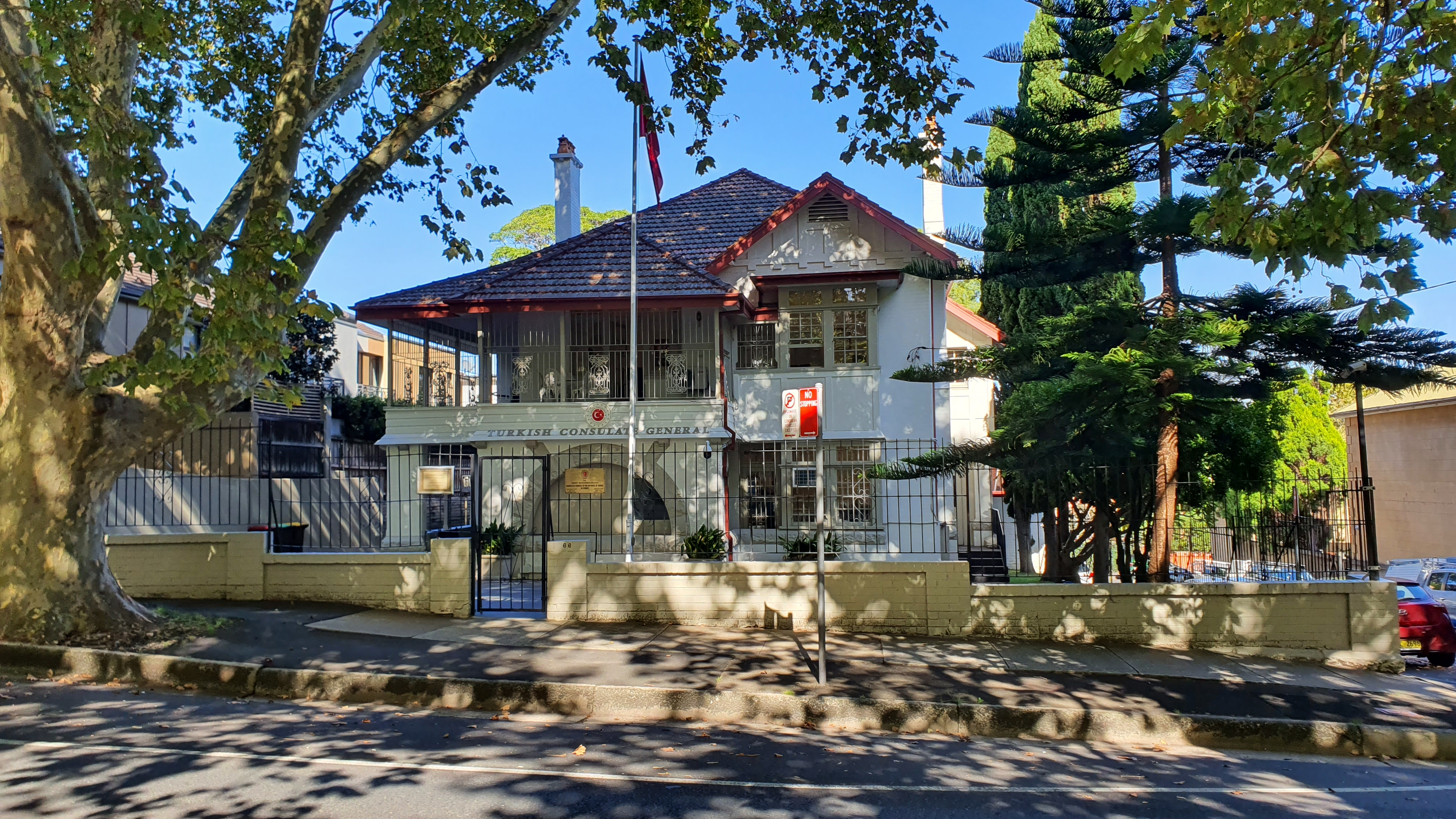
Consulate–General in Sydney

== International organizations ==
Organization	Host city	Host country	Mission	Concurrent accreditation	Ref.
Council of Europe	Strasbourg	France	Permanent Mission		
European Union	Brussels	Belgium	Permanent Mission		
ICAO	Montreal	Canada	Permanent Mission		
NATO	Brussels	Belgium	Permanent Mission		
OECD	Paris	France	Permanent Mission		
OIC	Jeddah	Saudi Arabia	Permanent Mission		
OSCE	Vienna	Austria	Permanent Mission		
UNESCO	Paris	France	Permanent Mission		
United Nations	New York City	United States	Permanent Mission		
United Nations at Geneva	Geneva	Switzerland	Permanent Mission		
United Nations at Nairobi	Nairobi	Kenya	Permanent Mission		
United Nations at Vienna	Vienna	Austria	Permanent Mission		
WTO	Geneva	Switzerland	Permanent Mission		

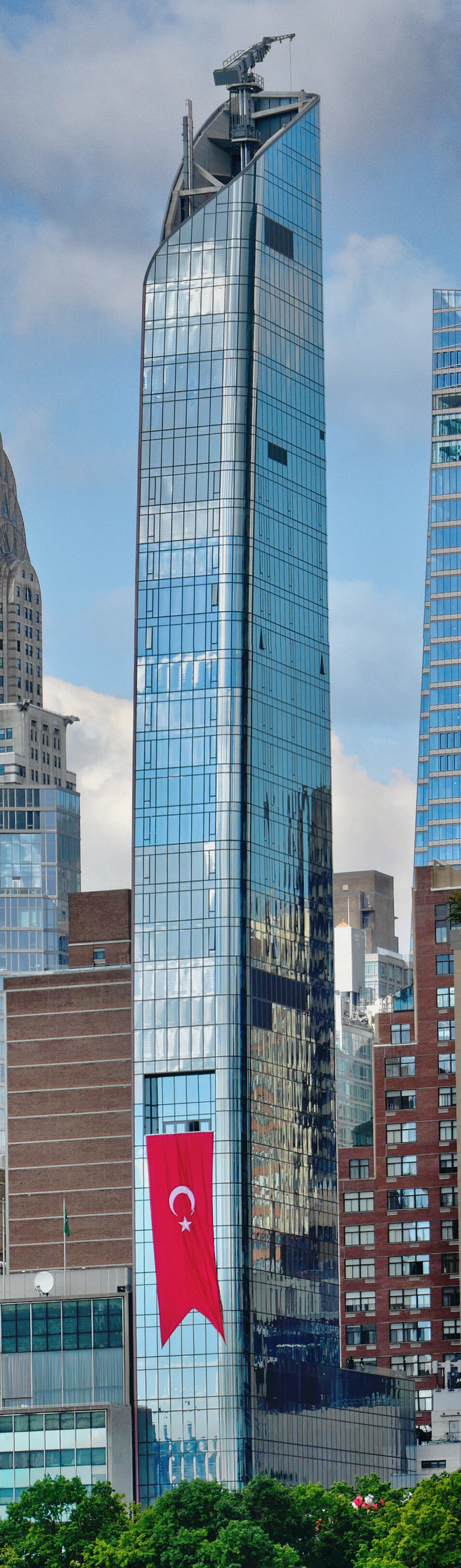
Building hosting the Permanent Mission to the United Nations in New York City

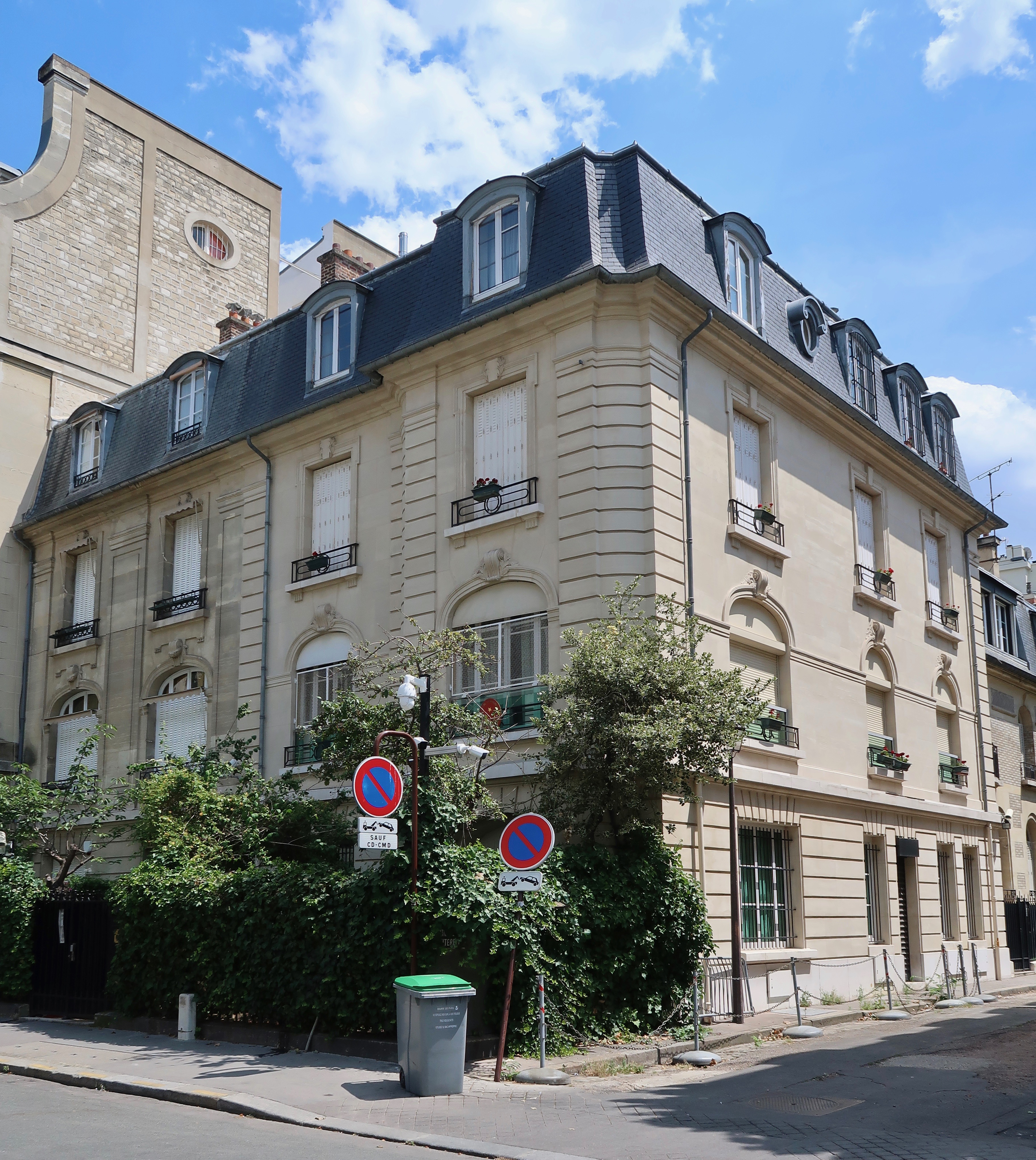
Permanent Mission to the OECD in Paris

== Missions to open ==
Country	Host city	Mission	Ref.
Afghanistan	Kandahar	Consulate–General	
Albania	Vlorë	Consulate–General	
Azerbaijan	Shusha	Consulate–General	
Brazil	Rio de Janeiro	Consulate–General	
Central African Republic	Bangui	Embassy	
Eswatini	Mbabane	Embassy	
Fiji	Suva	Embassy	
India	Chennai	Consulate–General	
India	Kolkata	Consulate–General	
Iraq	Kirkuk	Consulate–General	
Japan	Osaka	Consulate–General	
Lesotho	Maseru	Embassy	
Liberia	Monrovia	Embassy	
Libya	Sabha	Consulate–General	
Malawi	Lilongwe	Embassy	
Maldives	Malé	Embassy	
Nepal	Kathmandu	Embassy	
Netherlands	Eindhoven	Consulate–General	
Nigeria	Lagos	Consulate–General	
Turkmenistan	Türkmenbaşy	Consulate–General	
Ukraine	Kharkiv	Consulate–General	
Ukraine	Lviv	Consulate–General	
United States	San Francisco	Consulate–General	
Vietnam	Ho Chi Minh City	Consulate–General	
Yemen	Aden	Consulate–General	

== See also ==
- Foreign relations of Turkey
- List of diplomatic missions in Turkey
