= Embassy of Turkey, Buenos Aires =

Ambassador of Turkey to Argentina
- Emblem of the Turkish Embassy in Buenos Aires
- Ministry of Foreign Affairs
- Style: His Excellency
- Reports to: Minister of Foreign Affairs
- Seat: Buenos Aires
- Appointer: President of Turkey
- Term length: At the pleasure of the president
- Website: http://buenosaires.be.mfa.gov.tr/

The Embassy of Turkey in Buenos Aires (Turkish: Türkiye'nin Buenos Aires Büyükelçiliği) is the official diplomatic representation of Turkey in Argentina. Located in the capital city of Buenos Aires, the embassy is responsible for promoting and protecting Turkey's political, economic, and cultural interests in Argentina, as well as fostering closer ties between the two countries. The embassy is staffed by diplomats and support staff who work to facilitate bilateral relations, provide consular services to Turkish citizens residing in Argentina, and promote Turkish culture and values in the local community. With its prime location in one of South America's most important cultural and economic centers, the Embassy of Turkey in Buenos Aires plays a crucial role in advancing Turkey's interests and strengthening ties between Turkey and the region.
